= Avro Vulcan =

British jet-powered delta wing strategic bomber

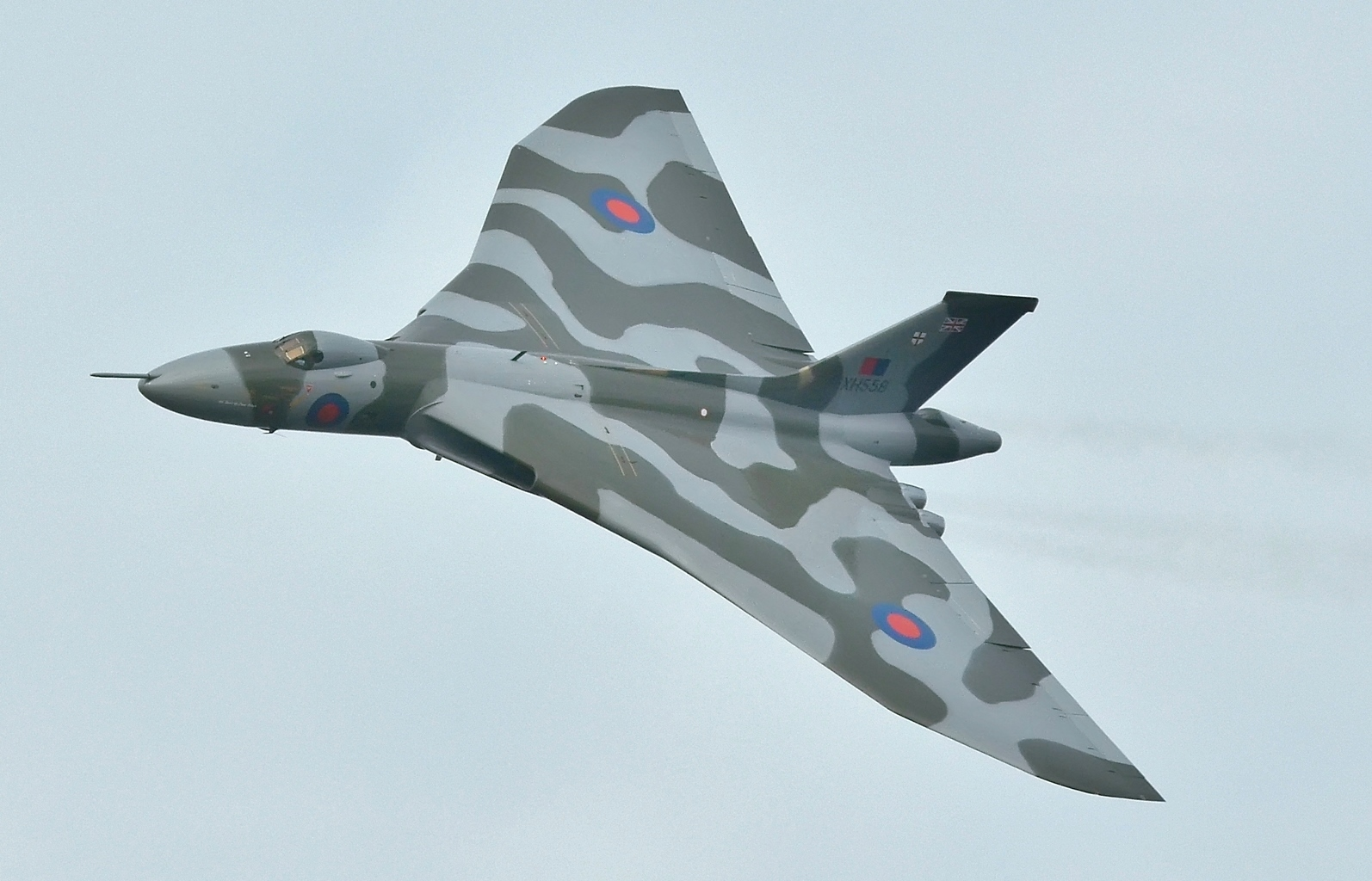
- Avro Vulcan XH558 over Farnborough, 2015

General information
- Type: Strategic bomber
- National origin: United Kingdom
- Manufacturer: Avro; Hawker Siddeley Aviation
- Status: Retired
- Primary user: Royal Air Force
- Number built: 136 (including prototypes)

History
- Manufactured: 1956–1965
- Introduction date: September 1956
- First flight: 30 August 1952
- Retired: March 1984 (Royal Air Force); October 2015 (XH558)
- Developed into: Avro Atlantic (proposed)

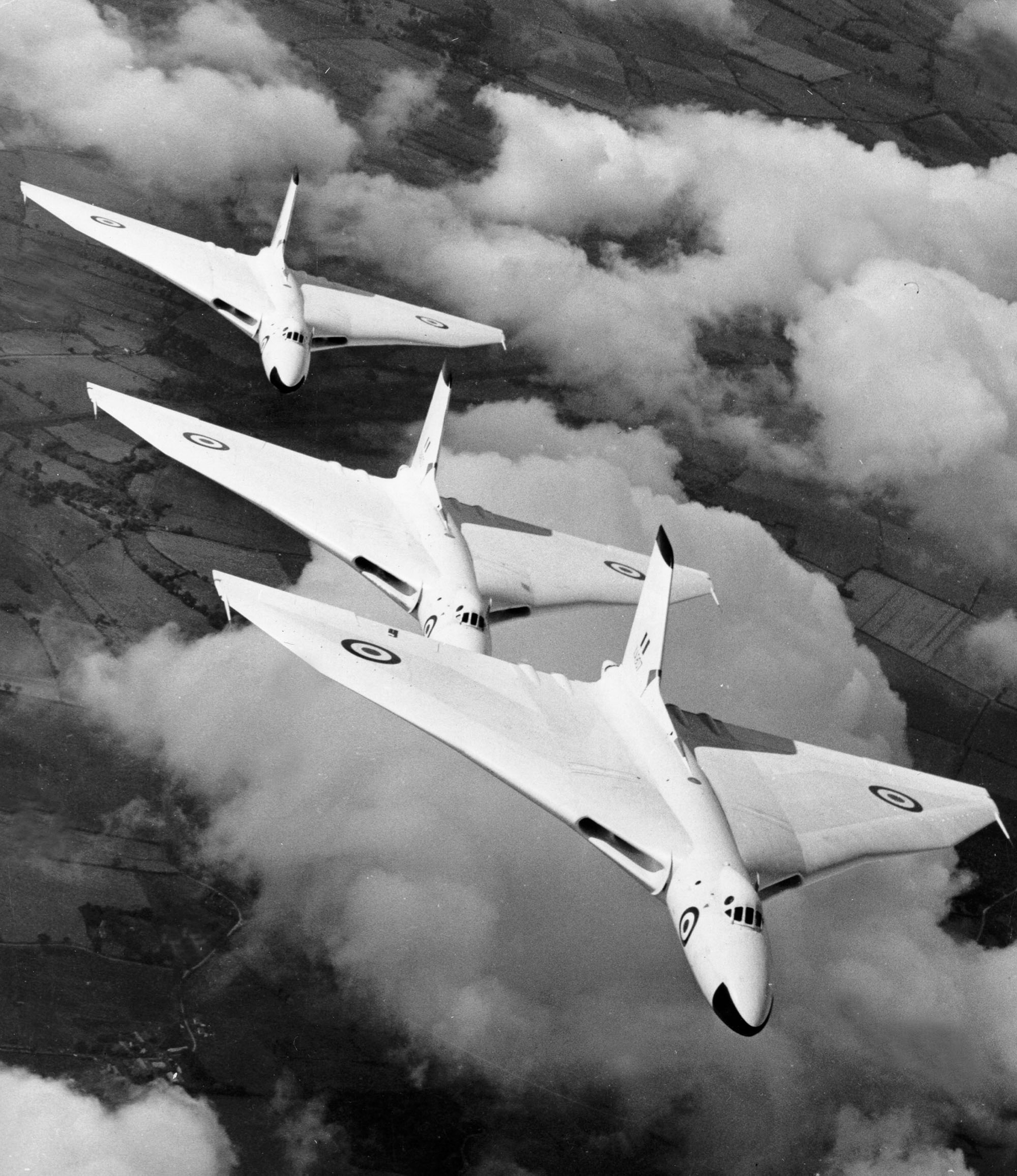
Vulcans in anti-flash white in 1957

The Avro Vulcan (later Hawker Siddeley Vulcan from July 1963=) is a jet-powered, delta-wing, high-altitude strategic bomber, which was operated by the Royal Air Force (RAF) from 1956 until 1984. Aircraft manufacturer A.V. Roe and Company (Avro) designed the Vulcan in response to Specification B.35/46. Of the three V bombers produced, the Vulcan was considered the most technically advanced, and therefore the riskiest option. Several reduced-scale aircraft, designated Avro 707s, were produced to test and refine the delta-wing design principles.

The Vulcan B.1 was first delivered to the RAF in 1956; deliveries of the improved Vulcan B.2 started in 1960. The B.2 featured more powerful engines, a larger wing, an improved electrical system, and electronic countermeasures, and many were modified to accept the Blue Steel missile. As a part of the V-force, the Vulcan was the backbone of the United Kingdom's airborne nuclear deterrent during much of the Cold War. Although the Vulcan was typically armed with nuclear weapons, it could also carry out conventional bombing missions, which it did in Operation Black Buck during the Falklands War between the United Kingdom and Argentina in 1982.

The Vulcan had no defensive weaponry, initially relying upon high-speed, high-altitude flight to evade interception. Electronic countermeasures were employed by the B.1 (designated B.1A) and B.2 from around 1960. A change to low-level tactics was made in the mid-1960s. In the mid-1970s, nine Vulcans were adapted for maritime radar reconnaissance operations, redesignated as B.2 (MRR). In the final years of service, six Vulcans were converted to the K.2 tanker configuration for aerial refueling.

After retirement by the RAF, one example, B.2 XH558, named The Spirit of Great Britain, was restored for use in display flights and air shows, whilst two other B.2s, XL426 and XM655, have been kept in taxiable condition for ground runs and demonstrations. B.2 XH558 flew for the last time in October 2015 and is also being kept in taxiable condition. XM612 is on display at Norwich Aviation Museum.

== Development ==
=== Origins ===
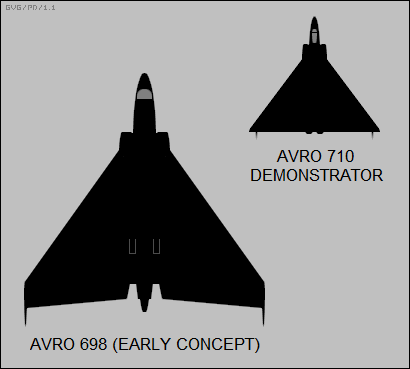
Silhouettes of an early Avro 698 concept and the cancelled Avro 710

The origin of the Vulcan and the other V bombers is linked with early British atomic weapon programme and nuclear deterrent policies. Britain's atom bomb programme began with Air Staff Operational Requirement OR.1001 issued in August 1946. This anticipated a government decision in January 1947 to authorise research and development work on atomic weapons, the U.S. Atomic Energy Act of 1946 (McMahon Act) having prohibited exporting atomic knowledge, even to countries that had collaborated on the Manhattan Project. OR.1001 envisaged a weapon not to exceed 24 ft 2 in (7.37 m) in length, 5 ft (1.5 m) in diameter and 10,000 lb (4,500 kg) in weight. The weapon had to be suitable for release from 20,000 to 50,000 ft (6,100 to 15,200 m).

In January 1947, the Ministry of Supply distributed Specification B.35/46 to UK aviation companies to satisfy Air Staff Operational Requirement OR.229 for "a medium range bomber landplane capable of carrying one 10,000 lb (4,500 kg) bomb to a target 1,500 nautical miles (1,700 mi; 2,800 km) from a base which may be anywhere in the world." A cruising speed of 500 knots (580 mph; 930 km/h) at altitudes between 35,000 and 50,000 ft (11,000 and 15,000 m) was specified. The maximum weight when fully loaded should not exceed 100,000 lb (45,000 kg). Alternatively, the aircraft was to be capable of carrying a conventional bomb load of 20,000 lb (9,100 kg). The similar OR.230 required a "long-range bomber" with a 2,000-nautical-mile (2,300 mi; 3,700 km) radius of action with a maximum weight of 200,000 lb (91,000 kg) when fully loaded; this requirement was considered too exacting. Six companies submitted technical brochures to this specification, including Avro.

Required to tender by the end of April 1947, work began on receipt of Specification B.35/46 at Avro, led by technical director Roy Chadwick and chief designer Stuart Davies; the type designation was Avro 698. As was obvious to the design team, conventional aircraft could not satisfy the specification. No worthwhile information about high-speed flight was available from the Royal Aircraft Establishment (RAE) or the US. Avro were aware that Alexander Lippisch had designed a delta-wing fighter and considered the same delta configuration would be suitable for their bomber. The team estimated that an otherwise conventional aircraft, with a swept wing of 45°, would have doubled the weight requirement. Realising that swept wings increase longitudinal stability, the team deleted the tail (empennage) and the supporting fuselage, it thus became a swept-back flying wing with only a rudimentary forward fuselage and a fin (vertical stabilizer) at each wingtip. The estimated weight was now only 50% over the requirement; a delta shape resulted from reducing the wingspan and maintaining the wing area by filling in the space between the wingtips, which enabled the specification to be met. Although Alexander Lippisch is generally credited as the pioneer of the delta wing, Chadwick's team had followed its own logical design process. The initial design submission had four large turbojets stacked in pairs buried in the wings on either side of the centreline. Outboard of the engines were two bomb bays.

In August 1947, Chadwick was killed in the crash of the Avro Tudor 2 prototype, and was succeeded by Sir William Farren. Reductions in wing thickness made incorporating the split bomb bays and stacked engines impossible, thus the engines were placed side by side in pairs on either side of a single bomb bay, with the fuselage growing somewhat. The wingtip fins gave way to a single fin on the aircraft's centreline. Rival manufacturer Handley Page received a prototype contract for its crescent-winged HP.80 B.35/46 tender in November 1947. Although considered the best option, the contract award for Avro's design was delayed while its technical strength was established. Instructions to proceed with the construction of two Avro 698 prototypes were received in January 1948. As an insurance measure against both radical designs failing, Short Brothers received a contract for the prototype SA.4 to the less-stringent Specification B.14/46. The SA.4, later named Sperrin, was not required. In April 1948, Vickers also received authority to proceed with their Type 660, which, although falling short of the B.35/46 Specification, but being of a more conventional design, would be available sooner. This plane entered service as the Valiant.

=== Avro 707 and Avro 710 ===
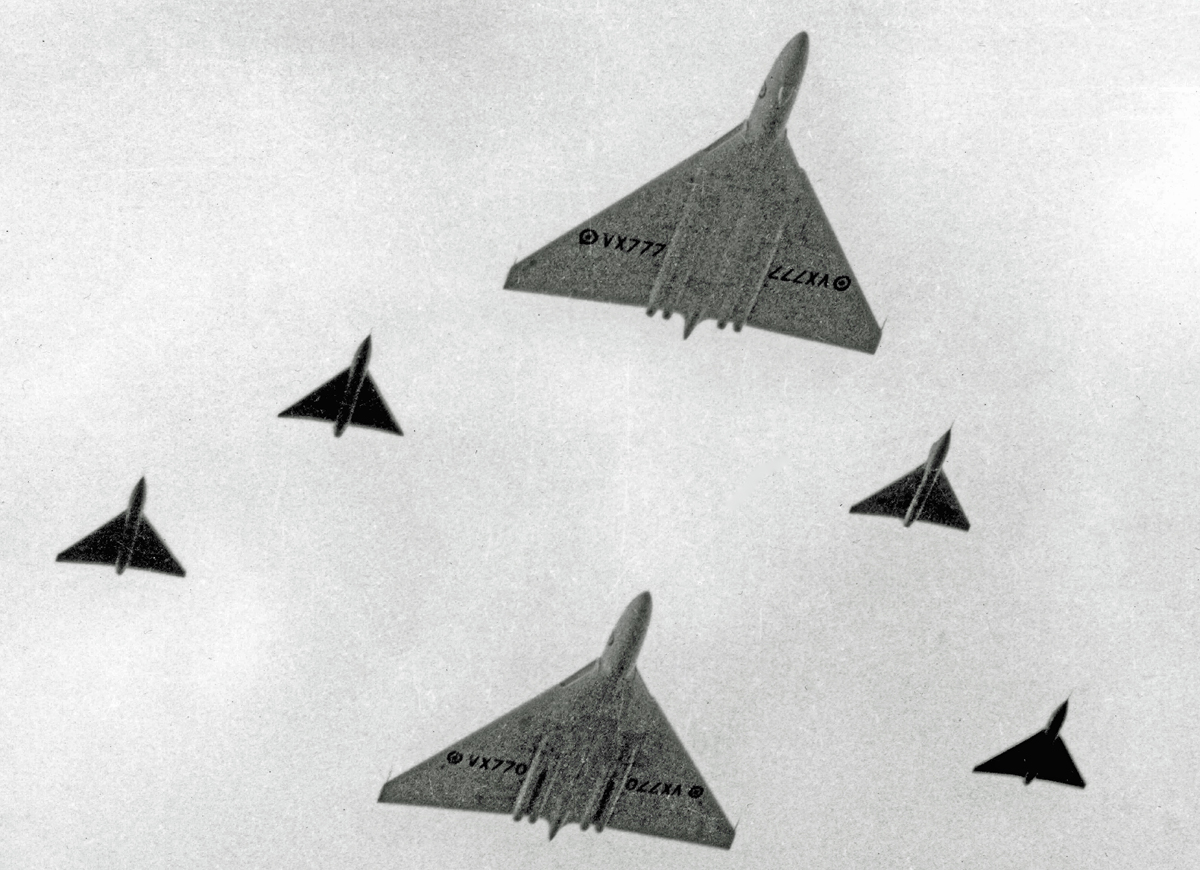
The prototype Vulcans (VX777 front, VX770 rear) with four Avro 707s at the Farnborough Air Show in September 1953: The large delta wings of the Vulcan quickly gave it the affectionate nickname of "Tin Triangle".

As Avro had no flight experience of the delta wing, the company planned two smaller experimental aircraft based on the 698, the one-third scale model 707 for low-speed handling and the one-half scale model 710 for high-speed handling. Two of each were ordered. The 710 was cancelled when it was considered too time-consuming to develop; a high-speed variant of the 707 was designed in its place, the 707A. The first 707, VX784, flew in September 1949, but crashed later that month, killing the Aeroplane and Armament Experimental Establishment's chief test pilot Squadron Leader Samuel Eric Esler, DFC, AE. The second low-speed 707, VX790, built with the still uncompleted 707A's nose section (containing an ejection seat) and redesignated 707B, flew in September 1950 piloted by Avro test pilot Wg Cdr Roland "Roly" Falk. The high-speed 707A, WD280, followed in July 1951.

Due to the delay of the 707 programme, the contribution of the 707B and 707A towards the basic design of the 698 was not considered significant, though it did highlight a need to increase the length of the nosewheel to give a ground incidence of 3.5°, the optimum take-off attitude. The 707B and 707A proved the design's validity and gave confidence in the delta planform. A second 707A, WZ736, and a two-seat 707C, WZ744, were also constructed, but they played no part in the 698's development.

=== Prototypes and type certification ===
==== First prototype VX770 and name ====
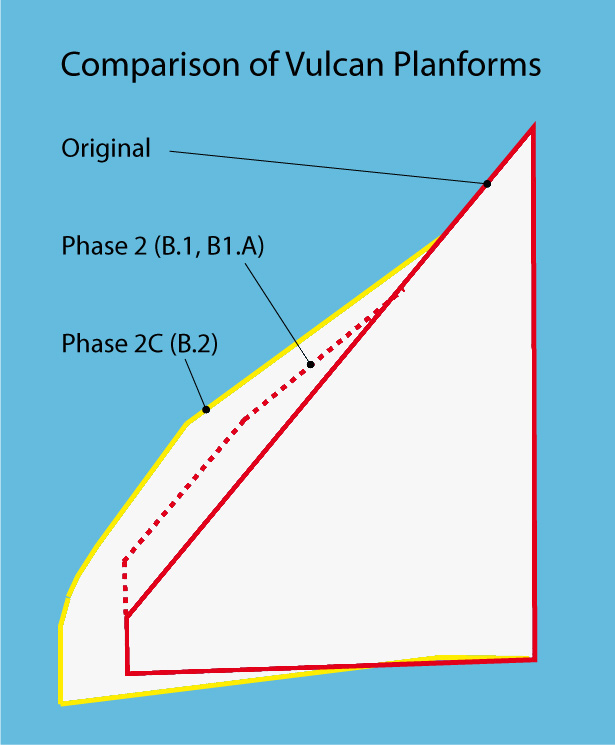
Comparison of Vulcan wing designs

More influential than the Avro 707 in the 698's design was the wind-tunnel testing performed at RAE Farnborough. This necessitated a wing redesign incorporating a cranked and drooped leading edge and vortex generators to avoid the onset of compressibility drag, which would have restricted the maximum speed. This wing modification resulted in the "phase 2" wing which was first investigated on Avro 707A WD480. This modification was too late to be incorporated on the two prototype 698s and the first three B.1 aircraft before their first flights. (The B.1s were quickly retrofitted).

Painted gloss white, the 698 prototype VX770, with its pure delta wing, flew for the first time on 30 August 1952 piloted by Roly Falk flying solo. VX770, fitted with only the first pilot's ejection seat and a conventional control wheel, was powered by four Rolls-Royce RA.3 Avon engines of 6,500 lbf (29 kN) thrust, its intended Bristol Olympus engines not being available. The prototype had fuselage fuel tanks but no wing tanks, so temporary additional tankage was carried in the bomb bay. VX770 made an appearance at the 1952 Society of British Aircraft Constructors' (SBAC) Farnborough Air Show the next month when Falk demonstrated an almost vertical bank.

After its Farnborough appearance, the future name of the Avro 698 was a subject of speculation. Avro had strongly recommended the name Ottawa, (Note: RAF bombers had been traditionally named after inland towns in the British Commonwealth or towns associated with industry.) in honour of the company's connection with Avro Canada. The weekly magazine Flight suggested Albion after rejecting Avenger, Apollo, and Assegai. The chief of the air staff preferred a V-class of bombers, and the Air Council announced the following month that the 698 would be called Vulcan after the Roman god of fire and destruction.

In January 1953, VX770 was grounded for the installation of wing fuel tanks, Armstrong Siddeley ASSa.6 Sapphire engines of 7,500 lbf (33 kN) thrust and other systems; it flew again in July 1953.

From 1957, VX770 was used as the flying testbed for the Rolls-Royce Conway by-pass engine. It crashed at a flying display at RAF Syerston in September 1958.

==== Second prototype VX777 ====
The second prototype, VX777, first flew on 3 September 1953. More representative of production aircraft, it was lengthened to accommodate a longer nose undercarriage leg to increase the angle of attack of the wing, shortening the take-off run. It featured a visual bomb-aiming blister under the cabin and was fitted with Bristol Olympus 100 engines of 9,750 lbf (43.4 kN) thrust. At Falk's suggestion, a fighter-style control stick had replaced the control wheel. Like VX770, VX777 had the original wing with straight leading edges. VX777 was joined in formation by the first prototype VX770 and four Avro 707s at the 1953 Farnborough Air Show. During trials in July 1954, VX777 was substantially damaged in a heavy landing at Farnborough. It was repaired, fitted with Olympus 101 engines of 11,000 lbf (49 kN) thrust before resuming trials with Avro and the Aeroplane and Armament Experimental Establishment (A&AEE) at Boscombe Down.

==== Testing and type certification ====
While exploring VX777's high-speed and high-altitude flight envelope at the A&AEE, mild buffeting and other undesirable flight characteristics were experienced while approaching the limiting Mach number, including an alarming tendency to enter an uncontrollable dive. This was judged unacceptable for an unarmed bomber. Fitting the phase 2 wing removed the buffeting and an auto-mach trimmer countered the high-speed dive. The latter applied up-elevator as the speed critically increased. This up-elevator force was greater than the force required to counter the dive. Consequently, as speed increased, the control column had to be pushed rather than pulled to maintain level flight. This artificial pitch-up made the Vulcan handle more like other aircraft as its speed increased.

The first production B.1 (Note: A contract for 25 production models had been made in July 1952. The same number of the rival Handley Page design, later named Victor, were also ordered.) XA889 first flew in February 1955 with the original wing and joined the trials in June. In September 1955, Falk, flying the second production B.1 XA890 (which had remained at Woodford as part of the MoS's Air Fleet on radio trials), amazed crowds at the Farnborough Air Show by executing a barrel roll on his second flypast in front of the SBAC president's tent. After two days of flying, he was called in front of service and civil aviation authorities and ordered to refrain from carrying out this "dangerous" manoeuvre. Now fitted with a phase 2 wing, XA889 was delivered in March 1956 to the A&AEE for trials for the type's initial Certificate of Airworthiness which it received the following month.

(In 1956, VX777 was modified with the even larger phase 2(C) wing. Fitted with Olympus 104 engines, it became the aerodynamic prototype of the Vulcan B.2.)

=== Into service ===
==== Vulcan B.1 and B1A ====
The first 15 production B.1s were powered by the Olympus 101. Many of these early examples in a metallic finish remained the property of the Ministry of Supply, being retained for trials and development purposes. Those entering RAF service were delivered to No 230 Operational Conversion Unit (OCU), the first in July 1956. Later aircraft, painted in anti-flash white and powered by the Olympus 102 with 12,000 lbf (53 kN) thrust, began to enter squadron service in July 1957. The Olympus 102s were modified during overhaul to the Olympus 104 standard, ultimately rated at 13,500 lbf (60 kN) thrust.

Rebuilding B.1s as B.2s was considered but rejected over cost. Nevertheless, to extend the B.1's service life, 28 (the surviving B1 aircraft fitted with Olympus 102/104 engines) were upgraded by Armstrong Whitworth between 1959 and 1963 to the B.1A standard, including features of the B.2 such as ECM equipment, in-flight refuelling receiving equipment, and UHF radio. However, the B.1As were not strengthened for low-level operations and all were withdrawn by 1968.

==== Vulcan B.2 ====
As far back as 1952, Bristol Aero Engines had begun development of the BOl.6 (Olympus 6) rated at 16,000 lbf (71 kN) thrust but if fitted to the B.1, this would have reintroduced the buffet requiring further redesign of the wing.

The decision to proceed with the B.2 versions of the Vulcan was made in May 1956, being developed by Avro's chief designer Roy Ewans. The first B.2 was anticipated to be around the 45th aircraft of the 99 then on order. As well as being able to achieve greater heights over targets, operational flexibility was believed to be extended by the provision of in-flight refuelling equipment and tanker aircraft. The increasing sophistication of Soviet air defences required the fitting of electronic countermeasure (ECM) equipment, and vulnerability could be reduced by the introduction of the Avro Blue Steel stand-off missile, then in development. To develop these proposals, the second Vulcan prototype VX777 was rebuilt with the larger and thinner phase-2C wing, improved flying control surfaces, and Olympus 102 engines, first flying in this configuration in August 1957. Several Vulcan B.1s were used for the development of the B.2: development of the BOl.6 (later Olympus 200), XA891; a new AC electrical system, XA893; ECM including jammers within a bulged tail cone and a tail warning radar, XA895: and for Blue Steel development work, XA903.

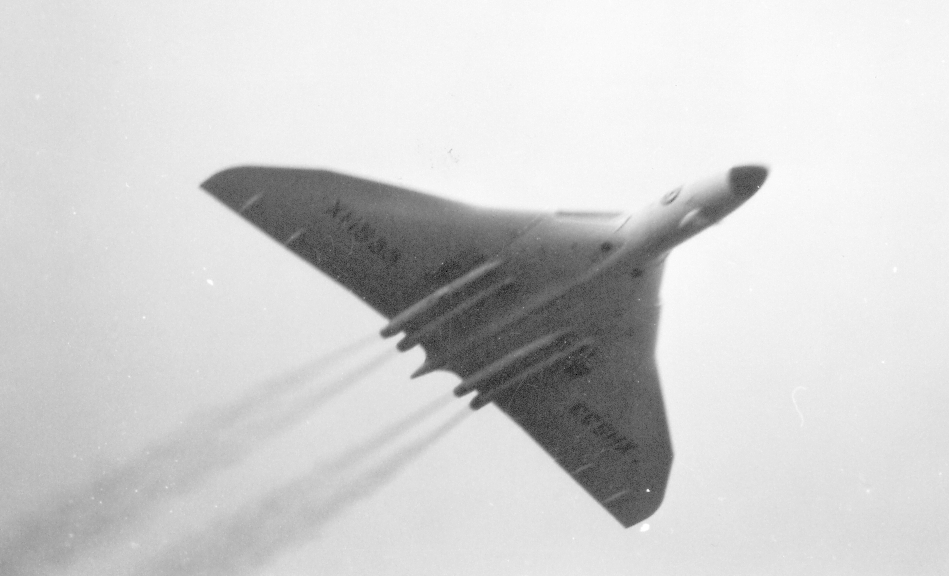
Avro Vulcan B.2 XH533, the first B.2 Vulcan, flying at Farnborough in 1958

The 46th production aircraft and first B.2, XH533, first flew in September 1958 using Olympus 200 engines, six months before the last B.1 XH532 was delivered in March 1959. The second B.2, XH534, flew in January 1959. Powered by production Olympus 201s with 17,000 lbf (76 kN) thrust, it was more representative of a production aircraft, being fitted with an in-flight refuelling probe and a bulged ECM tail cone. Some subsequent B.2s were initially lacking probes and ECM tail cones, but these were retrofitted. The first 10 B.2s outwardly showed their B.1 ancestry, retaining narrow engine air intakes. Anticipating even more powerful engines, the air intakes were deepened on the 11th (XH557) and subsequent aircraft. Many of the early aircraft were retained for trials, and the 12th B.2, XH558, was the first to be delivered to the RAF in July 1960. Coincidentally, XH558 was also the last Vulcan in service with the RAF, before being retired in 1992.

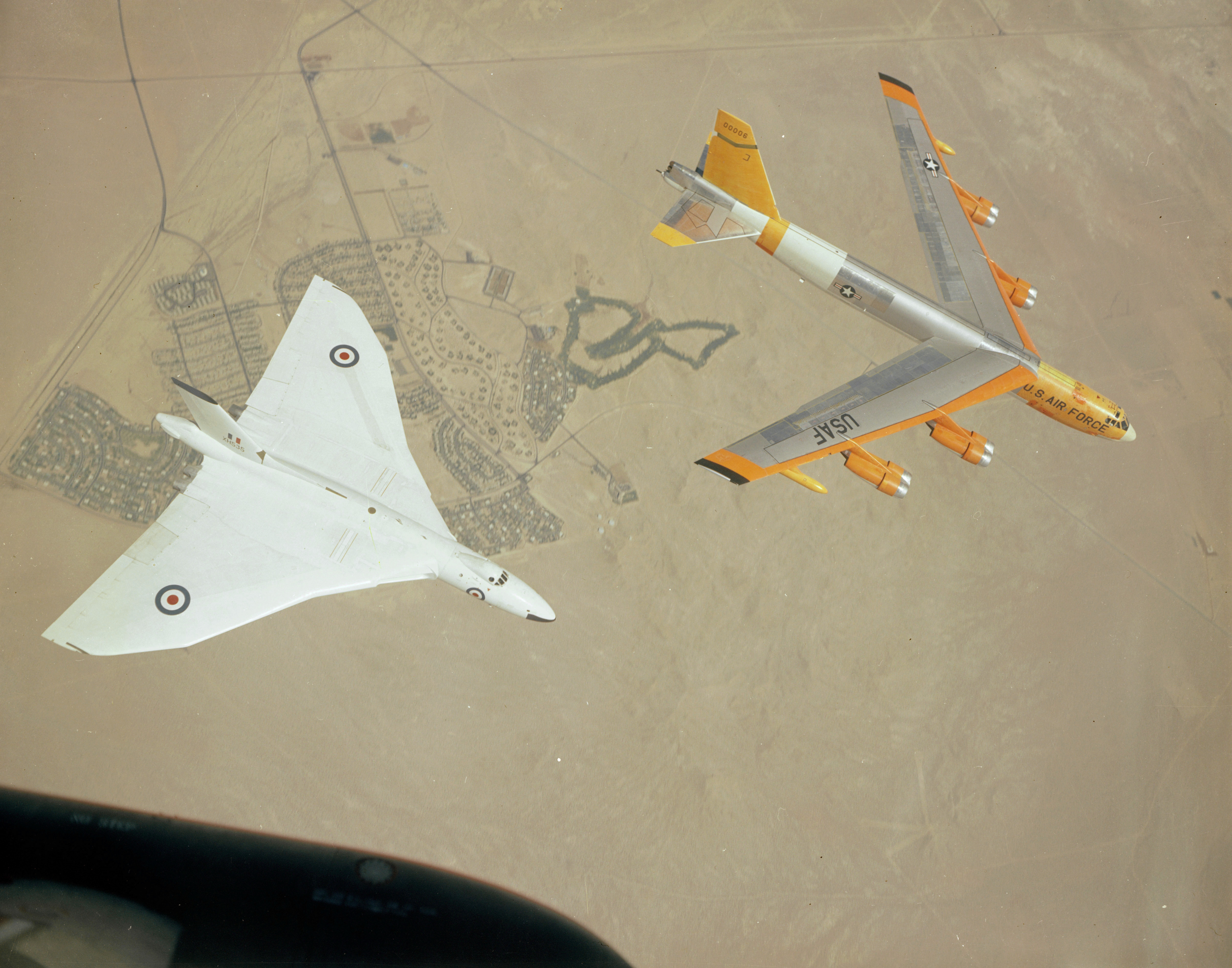
Avro Vulcan and B-52 over Edwards Air Force Base during Skybolt project

The 26th B.2, XL317, the first of a production batch ordered in February 1956, was the first Vulcan, apart from development aircraft, capable of carrying the Blue Steel missile; 33 aircraft were delivered to the RAF with these modifications. When the Mk.2 version of Blue Steel was cancelled in favour of the Douglas GAM-87 Skybolt air-launched ballistic missile in December 1959, fittings were changed in anticipation of the new missile, one under each wing. Though Skybolt was cancelled in November 1962, many aircraft were delivered or retrofitted with "Skybolt" blisters. Later aircraft were delivered with Olympus 301 engines with 20,000 lbf (89 kN) thrust. Two earlier aircraft were re-engined (XH557 and XJ784) for trials and development work; another seven aircraft were converted around 1963.

The last B.2 XM657 was delivered in 1965 and the type served until 1984. Whilst in service, the B.2 was continuously updated with modifications, including rapid engine starting, bomb-bay fuel tanks, wing strengthening to give the fatigue life to enable the aircraft to fly at low level (a tactic introduced in the mid-1960s), upgraded navigation equipment, terrain-following radar, standardisation on a common weapon (WE.177) and improved ECM equipment. Nine B.2s were modified for a maritime radar reconnaissance role and six for an airborne tanker role. An updated bomb rack assembly allowing the carriage of 30 1,000 lb bombs, up from 21 was demonstrated by Avro but was not introduced. In 1982, during the Falklands War, the updated B.2 made a bombing run against Port Stanley Airport, flying a distance of 4,000 mi (6,437 km).

=== Proposed developments and cancelled projects ===
Avro Type 718

The Avro 718 was a 1951 proposal for a delta-winged military transport based on the Type 698 to carry 80 troops or 110 passengers. It would have been powered by four Bristol Olympus BOl.3 engines.

Avro Atlantic

The Avro Type 722 Atlantic was a 1952 proposal (announced in June 1953) for a 120-passenger delta-winged airliner based on the Type 698.

Avro Type 732

The Avro 732 was a 1956 proposal for a supersonic development of the Vulcan and would have been powered by 8 de Havilland Gyron Junior engines. Unlike the proposed Avro 721 low-level bomber of 1952 or the Avro 730 supersonic stainless steel canard bomber dating from 1954 (cancelled in 1957 before completion of the prototype), the Type 732 showed its Vulcan heritage.

Vulcan Phase 6 (Vulcan B.3)

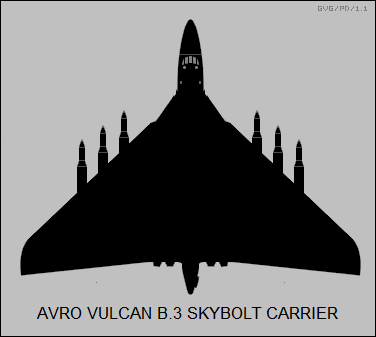
Silhouette of the original study for the Vulcan B.3 patrol missile carrier

In 1960, the Air Staff approached Avro with a request into a study for a patrol missile carrier armed with up to six Skybolt missiles capable of a mission length of 12 hours. Avro's submission in May 1960 was the Phase 6 Vulcan, which would have been the Vulcan B.3. The aircraft was fitted with an enlarged wing of 121 ft (37 m) span with increased fuel capacity; additional fuel tanks in a dorsal spine; a new main undercarriage to carry an all-up-weight of 339,000 lb (154,000 kg); and reheated Olympus 301s of 30,000 lbf (130 kN) thrust. An amended proposal of October 1960 inserted a 10 ft 9 in (3.28 m) plug into the forward fuselage with capacity for six crew members including a relief pilot, all facing forwards on ejection seats, and aft-fan versions of the Olympus 301.

Fighter-support Vulcan

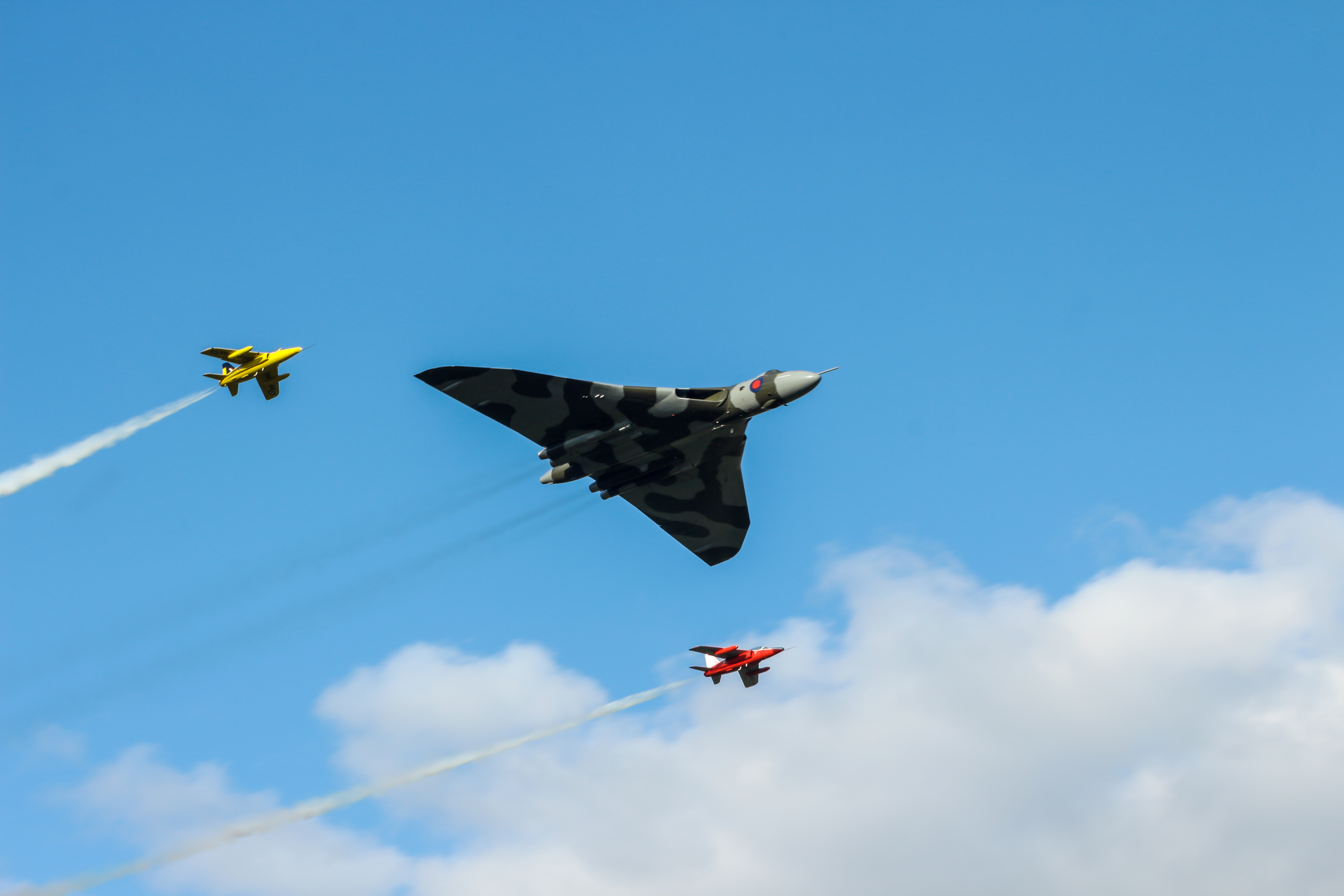
XH558 with two Folland Gnats, at an airshow in 2015

To counter improving Soviet defences after the cancellation of Skybolt, Avro proposed a Vulcan with three Gnat fighters slung underneath. The Gnats were to have been released in enemy airspace to provide fighter cover, and they were expected to land "in friendly territory" or return to the Vulcan to replenish their tanks by means of a specially installed flight-refuelling drogue.

=== Export proposals ===
Other countries expressed interest in purchasing Vulcans, but as with the other V-bombers, no foreign sales materialised.

Australia

As early as 1954, the Royal Australian Air Force (RAAF) recognised that the English Electric Canberra might soon become outdated. Potential replacements, such as the Boeing B-47E, Handley-Page Victor and Vulcan were considered.

Political pressure for a Canberra replacement came to a head in 1962, by which time agile, supersonic bombers/strategic strike aircraft, such as the North American A-5 Vigilante, BAC TSR-2, General Dynamics F-111, had become available. Had the Australian government pre-ordered the TSR-2, several V-bombers, including Vulcans, would have been made available, for interim use by the RAAF; however, the F-111C was ordered. (The UK government almost followed that decision – after the cancellation of the TSR-2 – it was offered the similar F-111K.)

Argentina

In the early 1980s, Argentina approached the UK with a proposal to buy a number of Vulcans. An application, made in September 1981, requested the 'early availability' of a 'suitable aircraft'. With some reluctance, British ministers approved the export of a single aircraft but emphasised that clearance had not been given for the sale of a larger number. A letter from the British Foreign and Commonwealth Office to the Ministry of Defence in January 1982 stated that little prospect was seen of this happening without ascertaining the Argentine interest and whether such interest was genuine: 'On the face of it, a strike aircraft would be entirely suitable for an attack on the Falklands.' Argentina invaded the Falkland Islands less than three months later, after which a British embargo on the sale of any military equipment was quickly imposed.

== Design ==
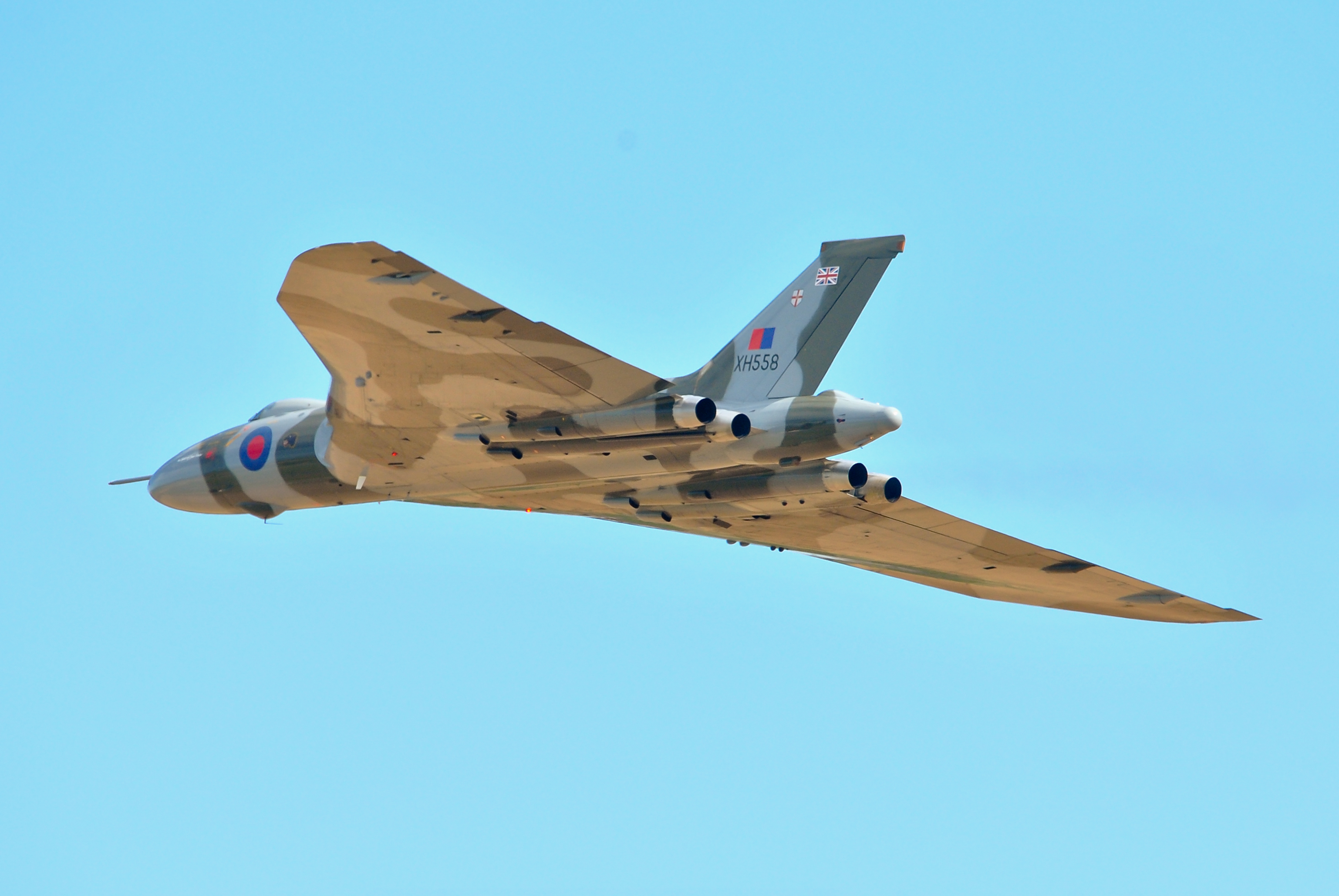
Avro Vulcan XH558 at Duxford Airshow 2012

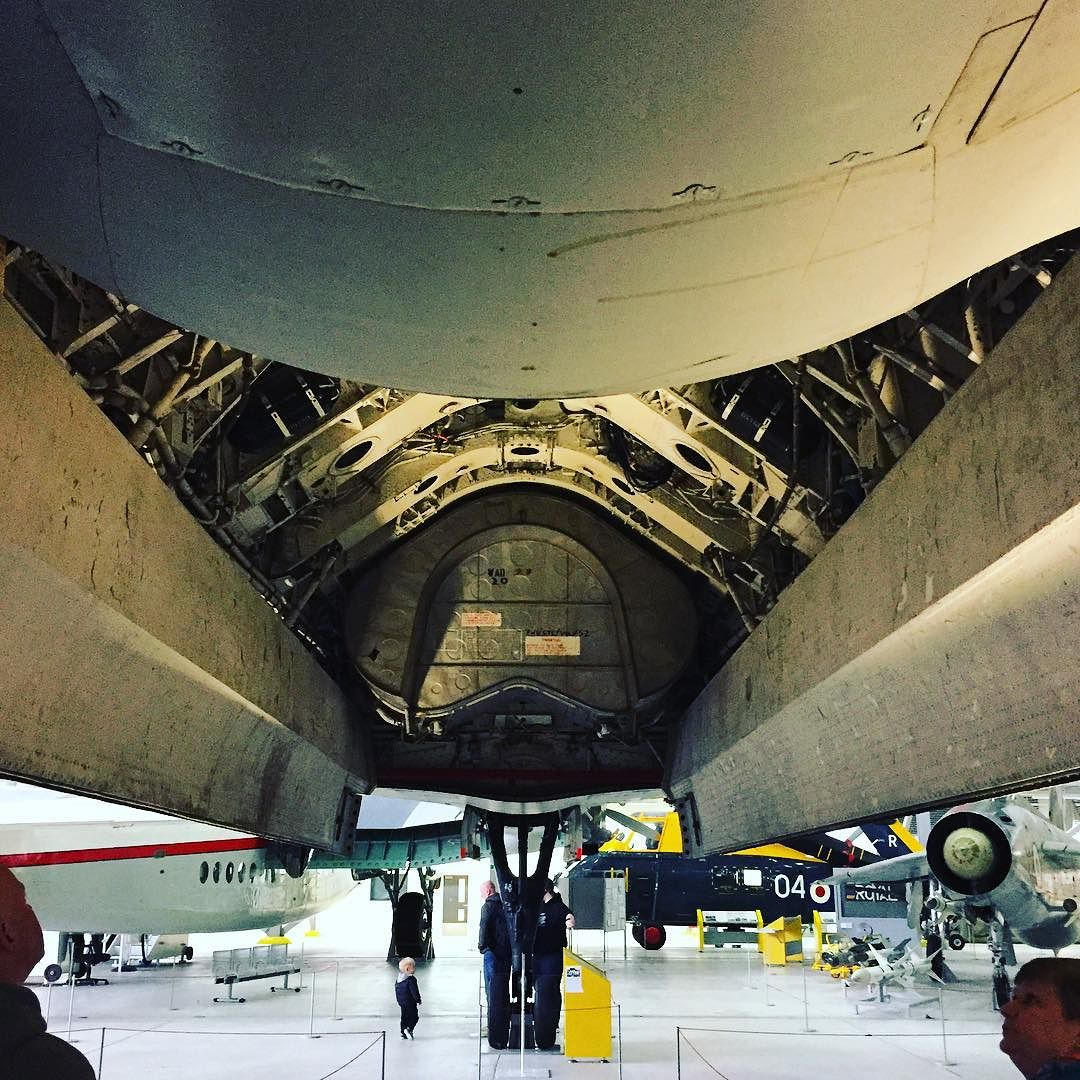
Bomb bay

=== Overview ===
Despite its radical and unusual shape, the airframe was built along traditional lines. Except for the most highly stressed parts, the whole structure was manufactured from standard grades of light alloy. The airframe was broken down into a number of major assemblies: The centre section, a rectangular box containing the bomb bay and engine bays bounded by the front and rear spars and the wing transport joints; the intakes and centre fuselage; the front fuselage, incorporating the pressure cabin; the nose; the outer wings; the leading edges; the wing trailing edge and rear end of the fuselage; and a single swept tail fin with a single rudder was on the trailing edge.

A five-man crew was accommodated within the pressure cabin on two levels; the first pilot and co-pilot sitting on Martin-Baker 3K (3KS on the B.2) ejection seats whilst on the lower level the navigator radar, navigator plotter, and air electronics officer (AEO) sat facing rearwards and would abandon the aircraft via the entrance door. The original B35/46 specification sought a jettisonable crew compartment, but this requirement was removed in a subsequent amendment; the rear crew's escape system was often an issue of controversy, such as when a practical refit scheme was rejected. A rudimentary sixth seat forward of the navigator radar was provided for an additional crew member; the B.2 had an additional seventh seat opposite the sixth seat and forward of the AEO. The visual bomb-aimer's compartment could be fitted with a T4 (Blue Devil) bombsight, in many B.2s, this space housed a vertically mounted Vinten F95 Mk.10 camera for assessing simulated low-level bombing runs.

Fuel was carried in 14 bag tanks, four in the centre fuselage above and to the rear of the nosewheel bay, and five in each outer wing. The tanks were split into four groups of almost equal capacity, each normally feeding its respective engine, though cross-feeding was possible. The centre of gravity was automatically maintained by electric timers, which sequenced the booster pumps on the tanks. B.2 aircraft could be fitted with one or two additional fuel tanks in the bomb bay.

Despite being designed before a low radar cross-section and other stealth factors were ever a consideration, an RAE technical note of 1957 stated that of all the aircraft so far studied, the Vulcan appeared by far the simplest radar-echoing object, due to its shape; only one or two components contributed significantly to the echo at any aspect, compared with three or more on most other types. (Note: Writing for the American Institute of Aeronautics and Astronautics, J. Seddon and E. L. Goldsmith noted that "Due to its all-wing shape, small vertical fin, and buried engines, at some angles [the Avro Vulcan] was nearly invisible to radar". While writing about radar systems, authors Simon Kingsley and Shaun Quegan singled out the Vulcan's shape as reducing the echo. While aviation author Doug Richardson has credited the Vulcan as having been difficult to acquire on radar, he went on to state that this was unlikely to have conferred a great military advantage. In contrast, electronic warfare author and ex-Vulcan AEO Dr Alfred Price maintains "the Vulcan [...] possessed a large radar signature.")

=== Colour schemes ===
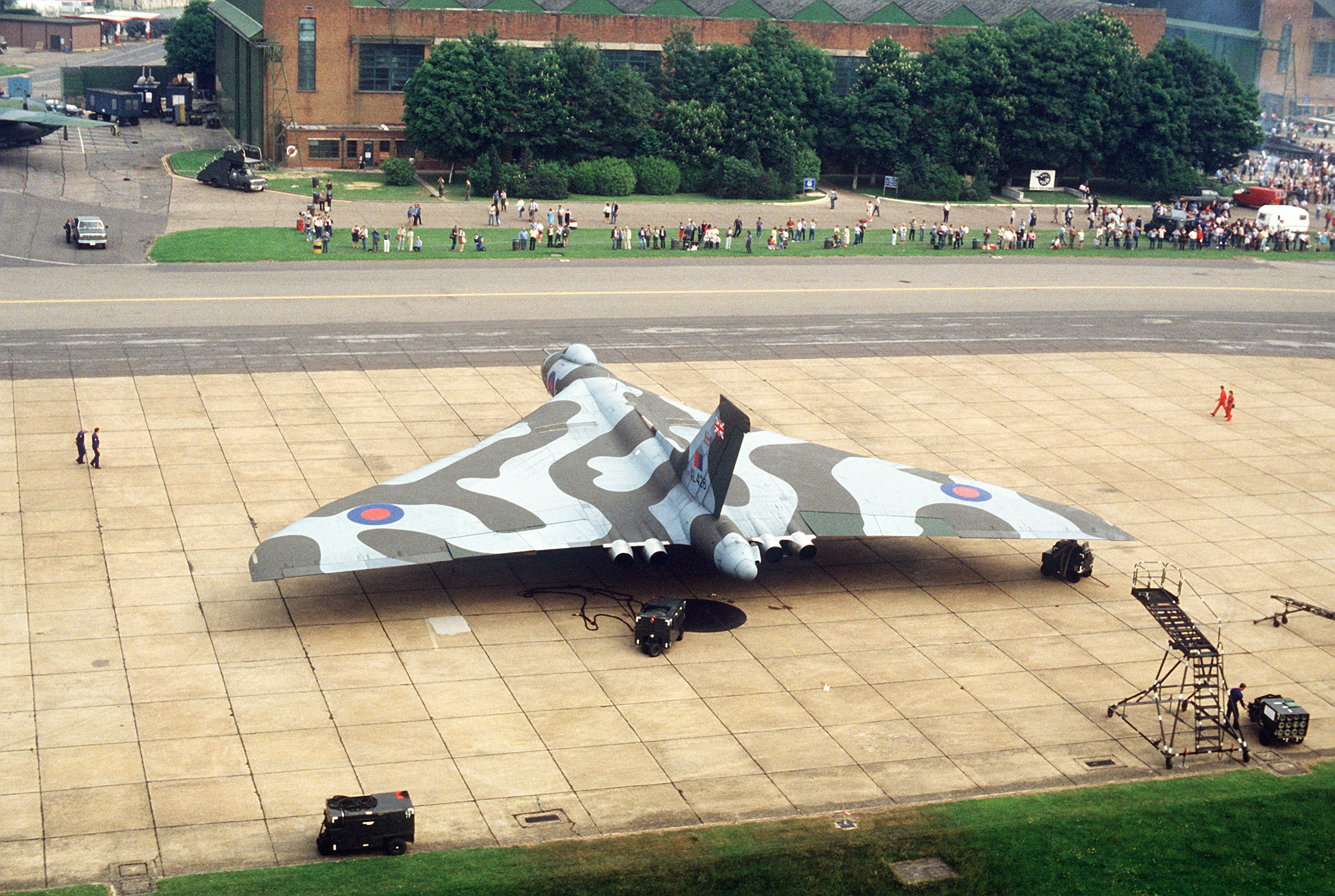
Aerial view of a Vulcan B.2 in late RAF markings on static display at RAF Mildenhall, 1984

The two prototype Vulcans were finished in gloss white. Early Vulcan B.1s left the factory in a natural metal finish; the front half of the nose radome was painted black, the rear half painted silver. Front-line Vulcan B.1s had a finish of anti-flash white and RAF "type D" roundels. Front-line Vulcan B.1As and B.2s were similar, but with pale roundels.

With the adoption of low-level attack profiles in the mid-1960s, B.1As and B.2s were given a glossy sea grey medium and dark green disruptive pattern camouflage on the upper surfaces, white undersurfaces, and "type D" roundels. (The last 13 Vulcan B.2s, XM645 onwards, were delivered thus from the factory). In the mid-1970s, Vulcan B.2s received a similar scheme with matte camouflage, light aircraft grey undersides, and "low-visibility" roundels. B.2(MRR)s received a similar scheme in gloss; and the front halves of the radomes were no longer painted black. Beginning in 1979, 10 Vulcans received a wrap-around camouflage of dark sea grey and dark green because, during Red Flag exercises in the US, defending SAM forces had found that the grey-painted undersides of the Vulcan became much more visible against the ground at high angles of bank.

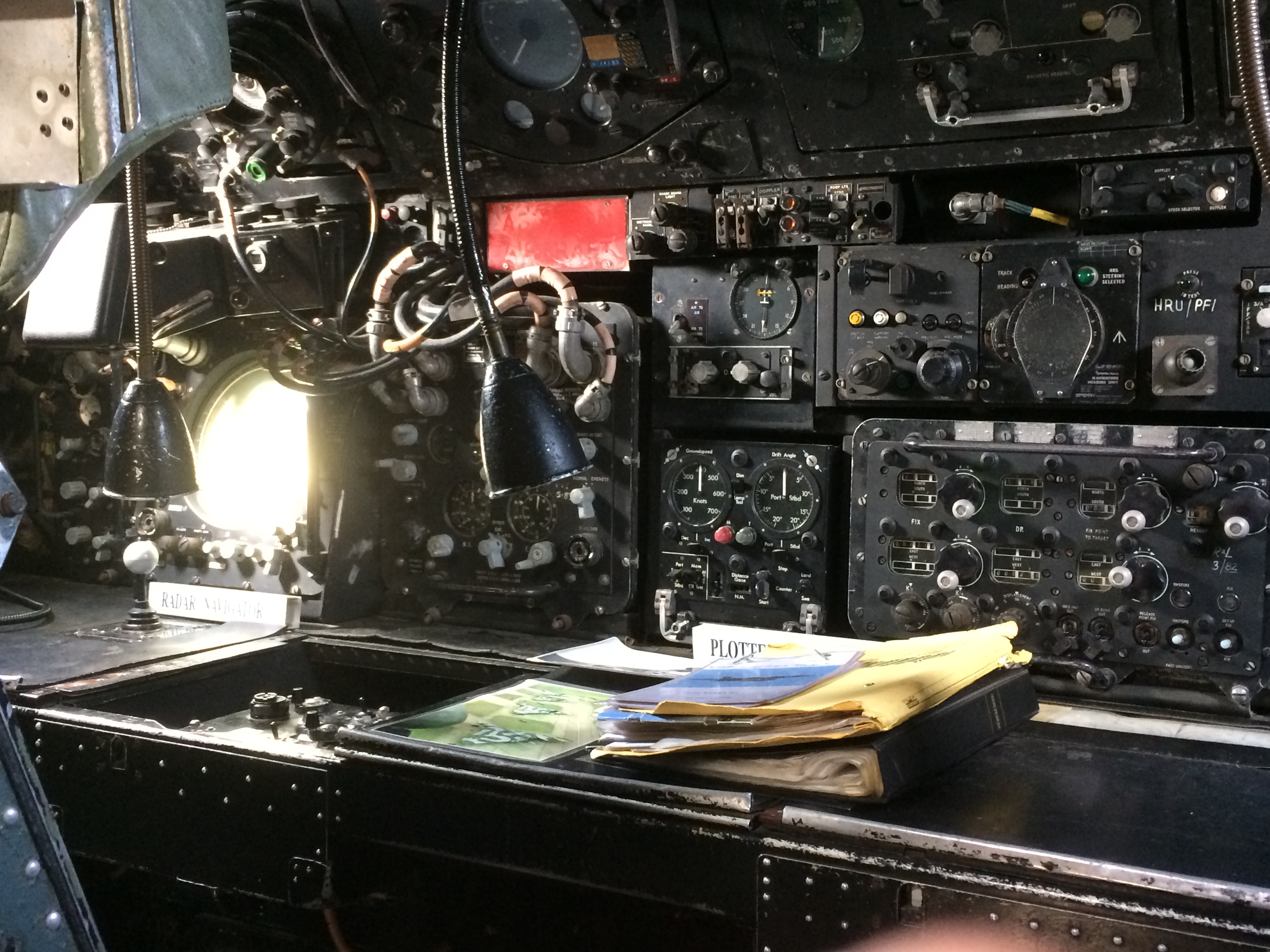
Avro Vulcan rear crew positions

=== Avionics ===
The original Vulcan B.1 radio fit was: two 10-channel VHF transmitter/receivers (TR-1985/TR-1986) and an STR-18, 24-channel HF transmitter-receiver (R4187/T4188). The Vulcan B.1A also featured a UHF transmitter-receiver (ARC-52). The initial B.2 radio fit was similar to the B.1A though it was ultimately fitted with the ARC-52, a V/UHF transmitter/receiver (PTR-175), and a single-sideband modulation HF transmitter-receiver (Collins 618T).

The navigation and bombing system comprised an H2S Mk9 radar and a navigation bombing computer Mk1. The Mark 2 aircraft had a modified navigation bombing computer Mk2. The updated computer would allow for operation up to 60,000ft and also a modified syncro system. The greater height was at the expense of a miniumum height being increased to 17,200ft. With the switch to low altitude operations the ballistic from Mk1 system was retrofitted restoring the height range from 7,200ft to 50,000ft.

Other navigation aids included a Marconi radio compass (ADF), GEE Mk3, Green Satin Doppler radar to determine the groundspeed and drift angle, radio and radar altimeters, and an instrument landing system. TACAN replaced GEE in the B.1A and B.2 in 1964. Decca Doppler 72 replaced Green Satin in the B.2 around 1969 A continuous display of the aircraft's position was maintained by a ground position indicator.

Vulcan B.2s were eventually fitted with the free-running dual-gyroscopic heading reference system (HRS) Mk.2, based upon the inertial platform of the Blue Steel missile, which had been integrated into the system when the missile had been carried. With the HRS a navigator's heading unit was provided, which enabled the navigator plotter to adjust the aircraft heading, through the autopilot, by as little as 0.1 degrees. The B.2 (MRR) was additionally fitted with the LORAN C navigation system.

The original ECM fit of the B.1A and B.2 was one Green Palm voice communications jammer; two Blue Diver metric jammers; three Red Shrimp S-band jammers; a Blue Saga passive warning receiver with four aerials; a Red Steer tail warning radar; and chaff dispensers. The bulk of the equipment was carried in a large, extended tail cone, and a flat ECM aerial counterpoise plate was mounted between the starboard tailpipes. (Note: Some B.2 aircraft armed with Blue Steel had an additional aerial plate fitted between the port tailpipes as the Blue Steel fin, in the lowered position, blanked signals from the starboard side.) Later equipment on the B.2 included: an L band jammer (replacing a Red Shrimp); the ARI 18146 X-band jammer; replacing the Green Palm; the improved Red Steer Mk.2; infra-red decoys (flares); and the ARI 18228 PWR with its aerials that gave a squared top to the fin.

=== Controls ===
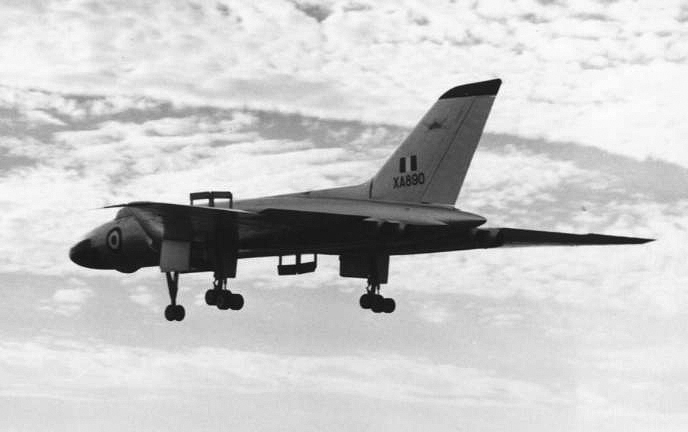
Vulcan B.1 XA890 in early silver scheme landing at Farnborough in September 1955 after Roly Falk's "aerobatic" display: Note the lower starboard airbrakes, inner and outer. The lower outer airbrakes were later deleted.

The aircraft was controlled by a fighter-type control stick and rudder bar, which operated the powered flying controls, which each had a single electrohydraulic-powered flying control unit, except the rudder, which had two, one running as a back-up. Artificial feel and auto stabilisation in the form of pitch and yaw dampers were provided, as well as an auto Mach trimmer.

The flight instruments in the B.1 were traditional and included G4B compasses; Mk.4 artificial horizons; and zero reader flight display instruments. The B.1 had a Smiths Mk10 autopilot. In the B.2, these features were incorporated into the Smiths Military Flight System (MFS), the pilots' components being: two beam compasses; two director-horizons; and an Mk.10A or Mk.10B autopilot. From 1966, B.2s were fitted with the ARI 5959 TFR, built by General Dynamics, its commands being fed into the director-horizons.

The B.1 had four elevators (inboard) and four ailerons (outboard). In the B.2, these were replaced by eight elevons. The Vulcan was also fitted with six electrically operated three-position (retracted, medium drag, high drag) airbrakes, four in the upper centre section and two in the lower. Originally, four lower airbrakes were used, but the outboard two were deleted before the aircraft entered service. A brake parachute was installed inside the tail cone.

=== Electrical and hydraulic systems ===
The main electrical system on the B.1/B.1A was 112 V DC supplied by four 22.5 kW engine-driven starter–generators. Backup power was provided by four 24 V 40 Ah batteries connected in series providing 96 V. Secondary electrical systems were 28 V DC, single-phase 115 V AC at 1600 Hz, and three-phase 115 V AC at 400 Hz, driven by transformers and inverters from the main system. The 28 V DC system was backed up by a single 24 V battery.

For greater efficiency and higher reliability, the main system on the B.2 was changed to three-phase 200 V AC at 400 Hz supplied by four 40 kVA engine-driven constant-speed alternators. Engine starting was then by air-starters supplied from a Palouste compressor on the ground. Standby supplies in the event of a main AC failure were provided by two primary systems: A ram air turbine driving a 17 kVA alternator was stowed in the underside of the port wing and could operate from high altitudes down to 20,000 ft (6,100 m). In addition an airborne auxiliary power plant, a Rover gas turbine driving a 40 kVA alternator was fitted within the starboard wing, and could be started once the aircraft was below an altitude of 30,000 ft (9,100 m). Secondary electrical supplies were by transformer-rectifier units for 28 V DC and rotary frequency converters for the 115 V 1600 Hz single-phase supplies.

The change to an AC system was a significant improvement. Each PFCU had a hydraulic pump that was driven by an electric motor, in modern terminology, this is an electro-hydraulic actuator. Because no manual reversion existed, a total electrical failure would result in a loss of control. The standby batteries on the B.1 were designed to give enough power for twenty minutes of flying time, but this proved to be optimistic and two aircraft, XA891 and XA908, crashed as a result.

The main hydraulic system provided pressure for undercarriage raising and lowering and bogie trim; nosewheel centring and steering; wheel brakes (fitted with Maxarets); bomb doors opening and closing; and (B.2 only) AAPP air scoop lowering. Hydraulic pressure was provided by three hydraulic pumps fitted to Nos. 1, 2 and 3 engines. An electrically operated hydraulic power pack (EHPP) could be used to operate the bomb doors and recharge the brake accumulators. A compressed air (later nitrogen) system was provided for emergency undercarriage lowering.

=== Engine ===
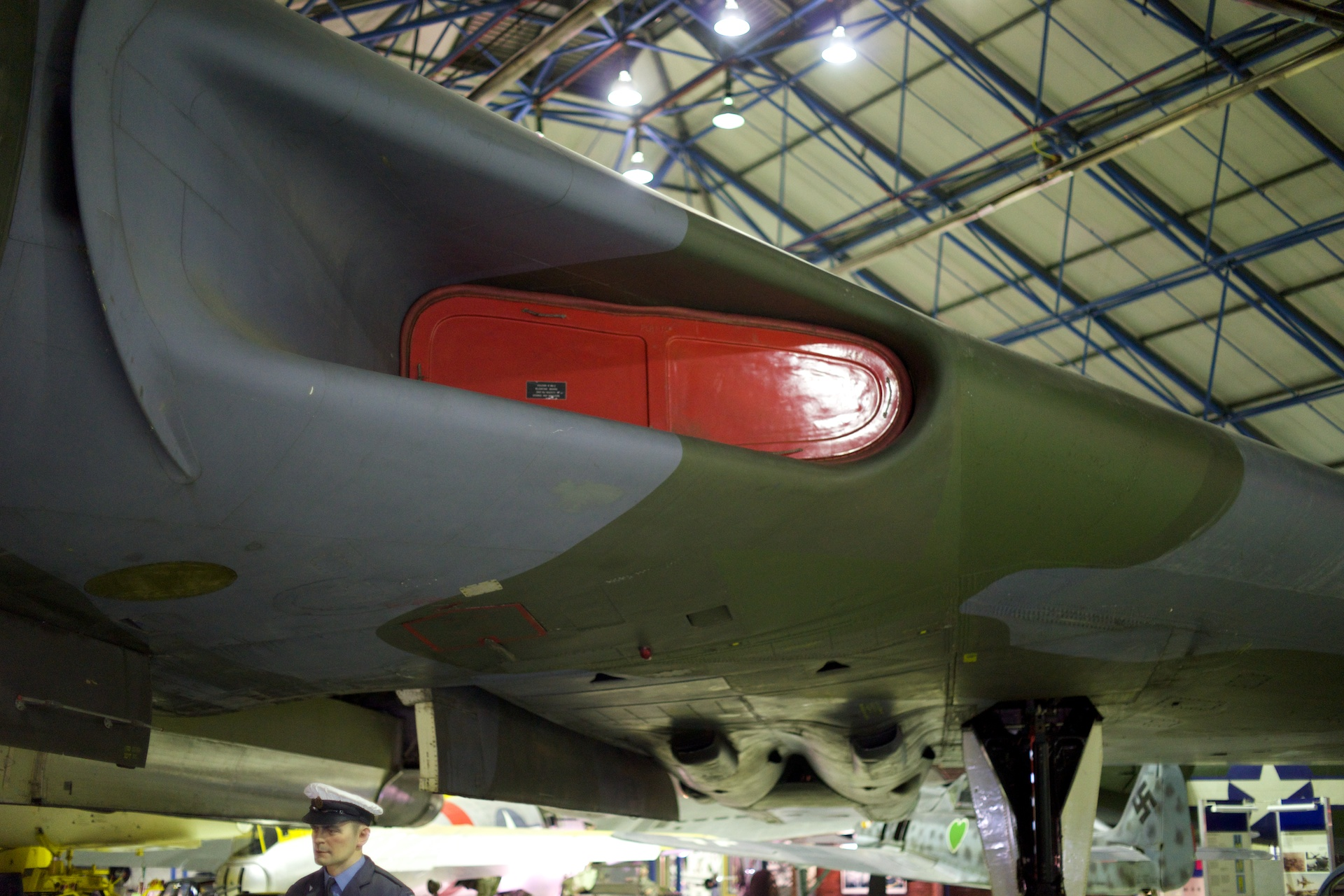
Air intake integrated in the wing, for the Olympus jet engines

The Rolls-Royce Olympus, originally known as the "Bristol BE.10 Olympus", (Note: Bristol Aero Engines merged with Armstrong Siddeley in 1959 to form Bristol Siddeley, which in turn was taken over by Rolls-Royce in 1966.) is a two-spool, axial-flow turbojet that powered the Vulcan. Each Vulcan had four engines buried in the wings, positioned in pairs close to the fuselage. The engine's design began in 1947, intended to power the Bristol Aeroplane Company's own rival design to the Vulcan.

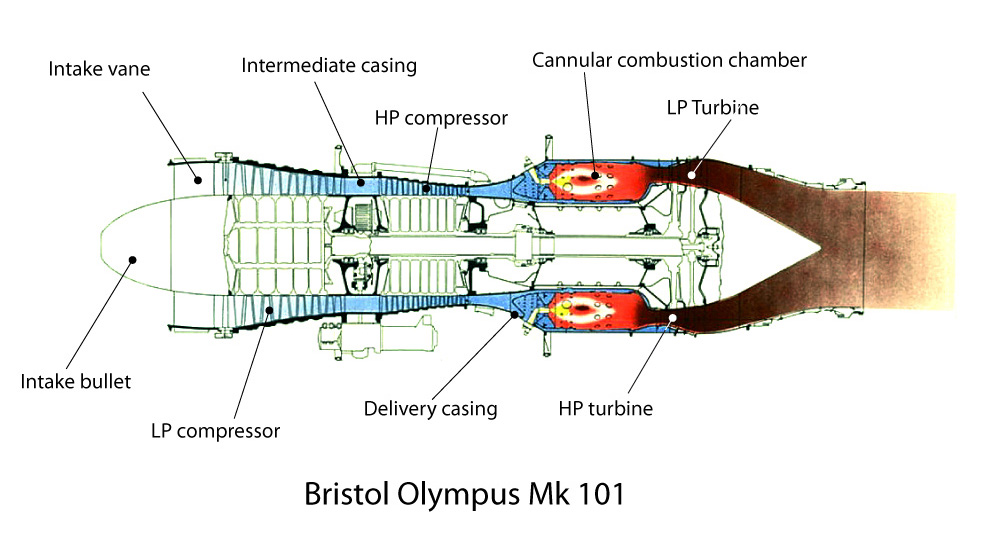
Gas-flow diagram of an Olympus Mk 101 engine

As the prototype Vulcan VX770 was ready for flight prior to the Olympus being available, it first flew using Rolls-Royce Avon RA.3 engines of 6,500 lbf (29 kN) thrust. These were quickly replaced by Armstrong Siddeley Sapphire ASSa.6 engines of 7,500 lbf (33 kN) thrust. VX770 later became a flying test bed for the Rolls-Royce Conway. The second prototype VX777 first flew with Olympus 100s of 10,000 lbf (44 kN) thrust. It was subsequently re-engined with Olympus 101 engines. When VX777 flew with a Phase 2C (B.2) wing in 1957, it was fitted with Olympus 102 engines of 12,000 lbf (53 kN) thrust.

Early B.1s were equipped with the Olympus 101. Later aircraft were delivered with Olympus 102s. All Olympus 102s became the Olympus 104 on overhaul and ultimately 13,500 lbf (60 kN) thrust on uprating. The first B.2 flew with the second-generation Olympus 200, design of which began in 1952. Subsequent B.2s were engined with either the uprated Olympus 201 or the Olympus 301. The Olympus 201 was designated 202 on being fitted with a rapid air starter. The engine would later be developed into a reheated (afterburning) powerplant for the cancelled TSR-2 strike/reconnaissance aircraft and the supersonic passenger transport Concorde.

Around 90% power, the engines in the Vulcan would emit a distinctive "howl"-like noise due to the air intake arrangement, which became an attraction at public airshows.

== Operational history ==
=== Introduction ===
In September 1956, the RAF received its first Vulcan B.1, XA897, which immediately embarked upon a round-the-world tour. The tour was to be an important demonstration of the range and capabilities of the aircraft, but it also had other benefits in the form of conducting goodwill visits in various countries; during their service, Vulcans routinely visited various nations and distant parts of the Commonwealth as a show of support and military protection. This first tour, however, was struck by misfortune; on 1 October 1956, while landing in bad weather at London Heathrow Airport at the completion of the world tour, XA897 was destroyed in a fatal accident.

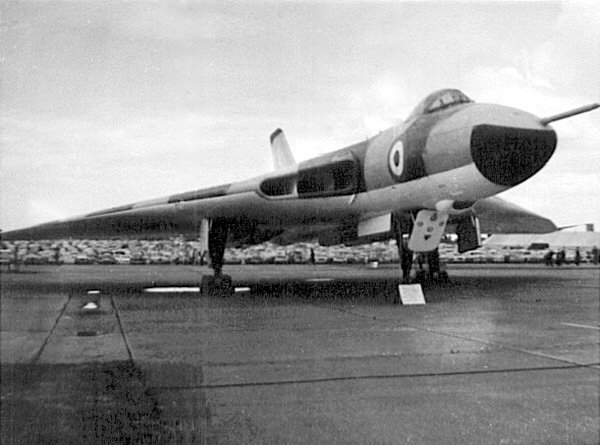
A Vulcan B1A of the Waddington Wing at Filton during a public air display in the 1960s

The first two aircraft were delivered to 230 OCU in January 1957 and the training of crews started on 21 February 1957. The first OCU course to qualify was No. 1 Course, on 21 May 1957, and they went on to form the first flight of No. 83 Squadron. No. 83 Squadron was the first operational squadron to use the bomber, at first using borrowed Vulcans from the OCU, and on 11 July 1956 it received the first aircraft of its own. By September 1957, several Vulcans had been handed over to No. 83 Squadron. The second OCU course also formed a Flight of 83 Squadron, but subsequent trained crews were also used to form the second bomber squadron, 101 Squadron. The last aircraft from the first batch of 25 aircraft had been delivered by the end of 1957 to 101 Squadron.

To increase the mission range and flight time for Vulcan operations, in-flight refuelling capabilities were added from 1959 onwards; several Valiant bombers were refurbished as tankers to refuel the Vulcans. Continuous airborne patrols proved untenable, however, and the refuelling mechanisms across the Vulcan fleet fell into disuse in 1965 after the Valiant tanker aircraft were withdrawn from Service.

Both Vulcans and the other V-force aircraft routinely visited the Far East, in particular Singapore, where a fully equipped nuclear-weapons storage facility had been constructed in 1959. These deployments were part of the UK's contribution to SEATO operations, often to test the defences of friendly nations in joint exercises. During the Indonesia–Malaysia confrontation, Britain planned to deploy three squadrons of V-bomber aircraft and 48 Red Beard tactical nuclear weapons to the region, although this was ultimately decided against. Vulcans trained in the region for both conventional and nuclear missions. In the early 1970s, the RAF decided to permanently deploy two squadrons of Vulcans overseas in the Near East Air Force Bomber Wing, based at RAF Akrotiri in Cyprus. The Vulcans were withdrawn in the mid-1970s, however, as Cypriot intercommunal violence intensified.

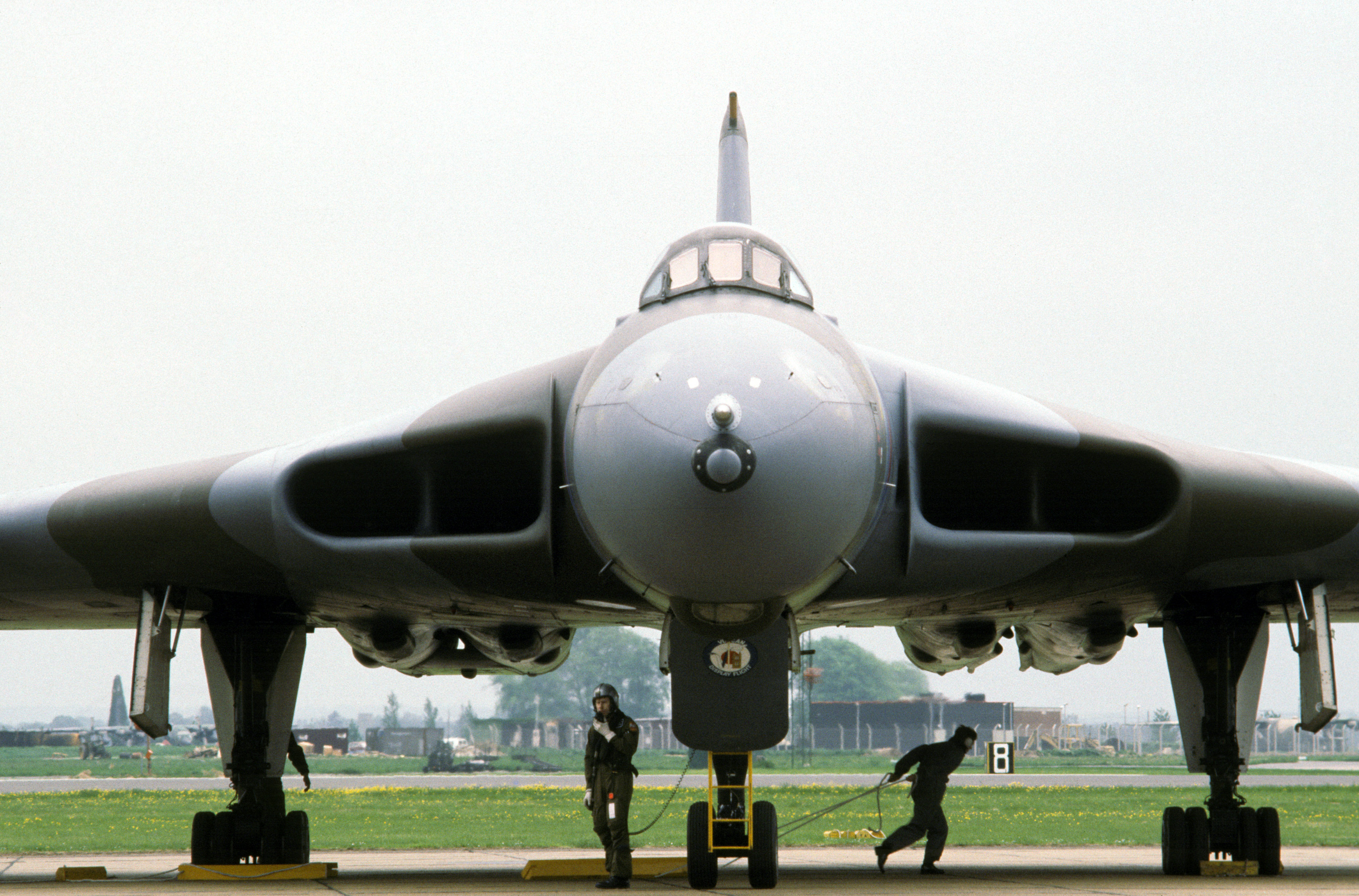
Royal Air Force Vulcan B.2 being prepared for flight on 25 May 1985

Vulcans flew some long-range missions. In June 1961, one flew 18,507 km from RAF Scampton to Sydney in just over 20 hours, facilitated by three air refuellings. Vulcans visited the United States in the 1960s and 1970s to participate in air shows and static displays, as well as to participate in the Strategic Air Command's (SAC) Annual Bombing and Navigation Competition at such locations as Barksdale AFB, Louisiana, and the former McCoy AFB, Florida. Vulcans also took part in the large Operation Sky Shield exercise in 1961, in which NORAD defences were tested against possible Soviet air attack: B-47s, B-52s, and a relatively small number of Vulcans simulated Soviet fighter/bomber attacks against New York, Chicago, and Washington, D.C. The results of the tests were classified until 1997. The Vulcan avoided USAF interceptors during the 1974 "Giant Voice" exercise.

=== Nuclear deterrent ===
As part of Britain's independent nuclear deterrent, the Vulcan initially carried Britain's first nuclear weapon, the Blue Danube gravity bomb. Blue Danube was a low-kiloton yield fission bomb designed before the United States detonated the first hydrogen bomb. These were supplemented by U.S.-owned Mk 5 bombs (made available under the Project E programme) and later by the British Red Beard tactical nuclear weapon. The UK had already embarked on its own hydrogen bomb programme, and to bridge the gap until these were ready the V-bombers were equipped with an Interim Megaton Weapon based on the Blue Danube casing containing Green Grass, a large pure-fission warhead of 400-kiloton-of-TNT (1.7 PJ) yield. (Note: According to UK parlance of the time, "megaton range" was understood to correspond to 500 kt or greater. The Green Grass warhead had a predicted yield of 500 kt.) This bomb was known as Violet Club. Only five were deployed before the Green Grass warhead was incorporated into a developed weapon as Yellow Sun Mk.1.

The later Yellow Sun Mk 2, was fitted with Red Snow, a British-built variant of the U.S. W28 warhead. Yellow Sun Mk 2 was the first British thermonuclear weapon to be deployed, and was carried on both the Vulcan and Handley Page Victor. The Valiant retained U.S. nuclear weapons assigned to SACEUR under the dual-key arrangements. Red Beard was positioned in Singapore for use by Vulcan and Victor bombers. From 1963, three squadrons of Vulcan B.2s and two squadrons of Victor B.2s were armed with the Blue Steel missile, a rocket-powered stand-off bomb, which was also fitted with the 1.1 Mt (4.6 PJ) yield Red Snow warhead.

Operationally, RAF Bomber Command and the SAC cooperated in the Single Integrated Operational Plan to ensure coverage of all major Soviet targets from 1958; 108 of the RAF's V-bombers were assigned targets under the plan by the end of 1959. From 1962 onwards, one aircraft per squadron in every RAF bomber base were armed with nuclear weapons and on standby permanently under the principle of Quick Reaction Alert (QRA). Vulcans on QRA were to be airborne within fifteen minutes of receiving an alert, although the amount of time between warning of a USSR nuclear strike being launched and it arriving in Britain was in the region of four minutes. The closest the Vulcan came to taking part in potential nuclear conflict was during the Cuban Missile Crisis in October 1962, where Bomber Command was moved to Alert Condition 3, an increased state of preparedness from normal operations; however, it stood down in early November.

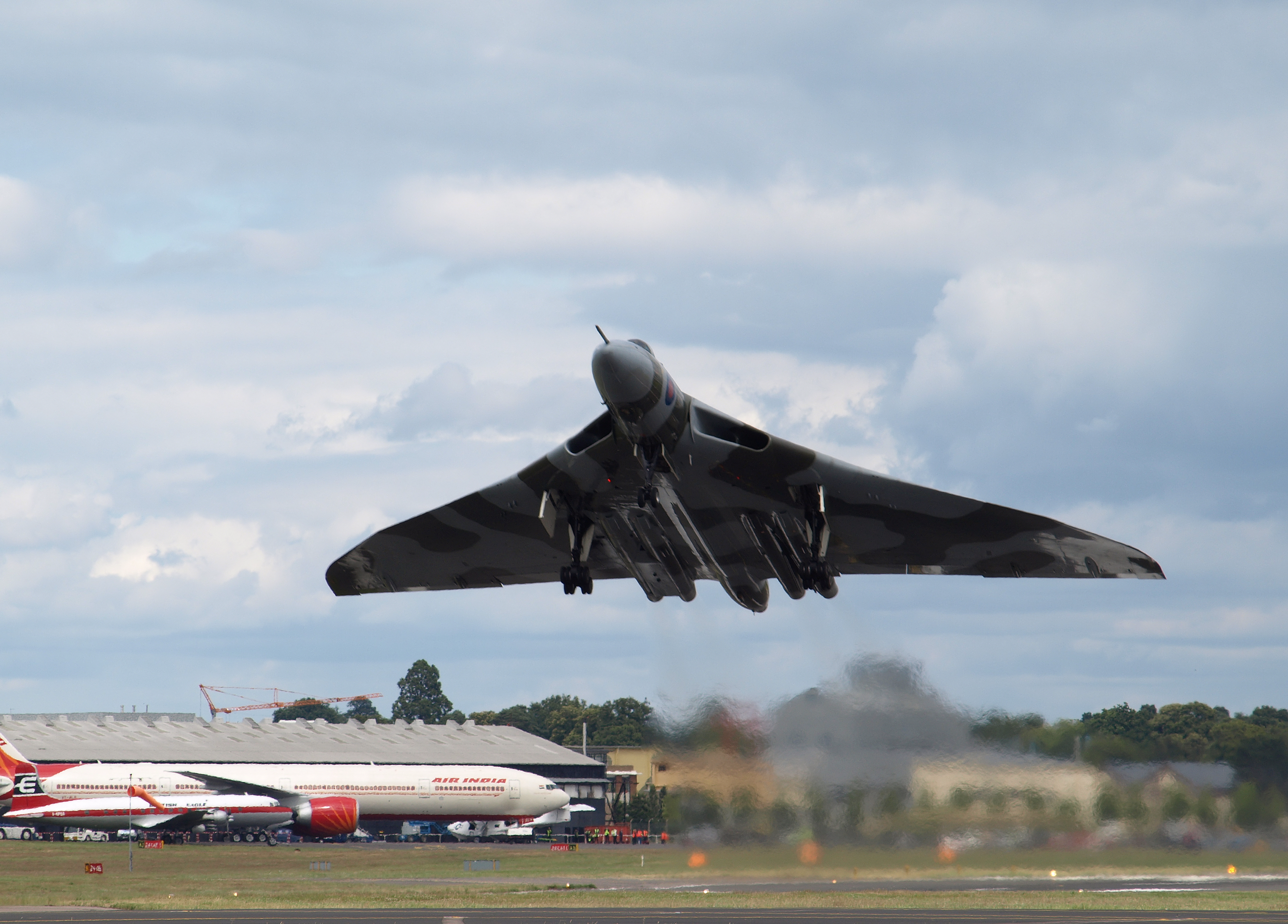
XH558 taking off, 2008 Farnborough Airshow

The Vulcans were intended to be equipped with the Skybolt missile to replace the Blue Steel, with Vulcan B.2s carrying two Skybolts under the wings. The last 28 B.2s were modified on the production line to fit pylons to carry the Skybolt. A B.3 variant with increased wingspan to carry up to six Skybolts was proposed in 1960. When the Skybolt missile system was cancelled by U.S. President John F. Kennedy on the recommendation of his Secretary of Defense, Robert McNamara in 1962, precipitating the Skybolt Crisis, Blue Steel was retained. To supplement it until the Royal Navy took on the deterrent role with Polaris SLBM-equipped submarines, the Vulcan bombers adopted a new mission profile of flying high during clear transit, dropping down low to avoid enemy defences on approach, and deploying a parachute-retarded bomb, the WE.177B. Before the availability of the WE 177 laydown mode the attack profile involved a pop up manoeuvre to allow the Yellow Sun time to arm. Initially this was a pop up to 11,000 feet and release in level flight. To further reduce exposure to SAM at release in the climb was developed. Depending on the Mk 1 or Mk 2 and the different engine configurations the aircraft was to pop up at a specified distance from the target, climb at a set angle, and release the weapon at 10,500 feet. In the case of the Mk 2 Vulcan with 301 series engines and the Yellow Sun this was 18,450 yards and 15°. Since the aircraft had been designed for high-altitude flight, at low altitudes training cruise speed was limited to 240 knots with a dash not exceeding 350 knots during practice attacks in order to preserve airframe fatigue life. War missions were planned with a low altitude speed of 325 knots and an upper speed of 375 knots. The aircraft was also cleared for a once only dash to 415 knots for 10 minutes. This was not stated but would probably been the final phase of a laydown attack. On one occasion prior to proper Release to Service clearance the author experienced just over 400 knots. We could certainly feel the additional turbulence. Subsequently, on a Bomber Command Trial we flew for 350 knots at 10,000 feet prior to general release clearance at that speed. RAF Air Vice Marshal Ron Dick, a former Vulcan pilot, said "it is [thus] questionable whether it could have been effective flying at low level in a war against ... the Soviet Union."

After the British Polaris submarines became operational and Blue Steel was taken out of service in 1970, the Vulcan continued to carry WE.177B in a tactical nuclear strike role as part of the British contribution to Europe's standing NATO forces, although they no longer held aircraft at 15 minutes' readiness in peacetime. Two squadrons were also stationed in Cyprus as part of the Near East Air Force and assigned to Central Treaty Organization in a strategic strike role. With the eventual demise of the WE.177B and the Vulcan bombers, the Blackburn Buccaneer, SEPECAT Jaguar, and Panavia Tornado continued with the WE.177C until its retirement in 1998. While not a like-for-like replacement, the multi-role Tornado interdictor/strike bomber is the successor for the roles previously filled by the Vulcan.

=== Conventional role ===
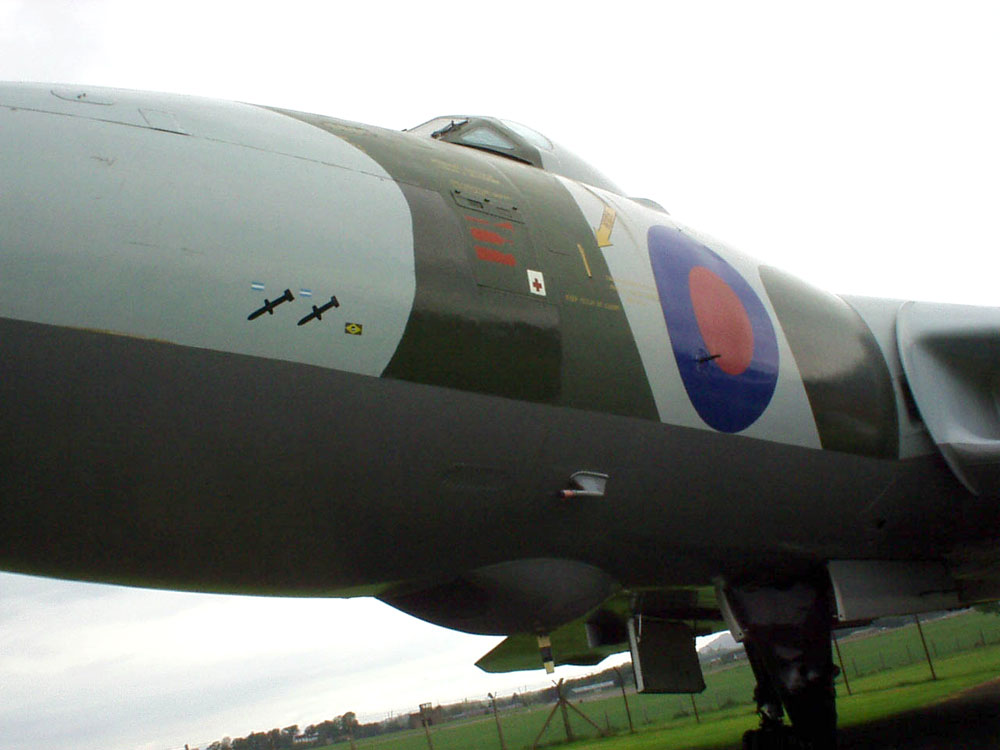
Vulcan XM597 at the National Museum of Flight, Scotland; note the Operation Black Buck markings and the small Brazilian flag indicating the aircraft's internment in Brazil.

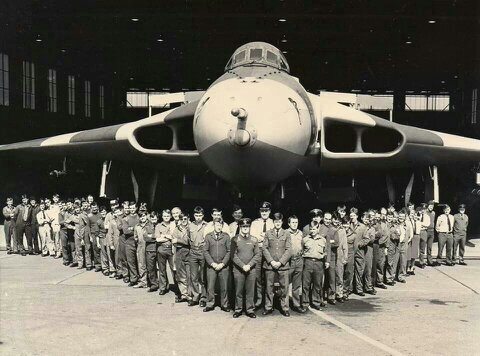
Engineers and flight crew with the Vulcan prior to deployment to Ascension Island

Although in operational use the Vulcan typically carried various nuclear armaments, the type also had a secondary conventional role. While performing conventional combat missions, the Vulcan could carry up to 21 1,000 lb (454 kg) bombs inside its bomb bay. From the 1960s, the various Vulcan squadrons routinely conducted conventional training missions; the aircrews were expected to be able to perform conventional bombing missions, in addition to the critical nuclear strike mission. Conventional bombing was practised with different profiles depending on expected target defences. Against a target defended by aircraft and SAM the most likely profile would have been a laydown profile with a retard tail unit (Mk 117). Where the target was defended by Soviet SA2 Guideline missiles the aircraft could pop up to 2,500 feet, below the SAM and above the self-damage limit for free-fall bombs. If the target defence was air defence artillery the attack might pop up to 8,000 feet to minimise risk from guns and with the advantage that automatic bombing computation with the Navigation and Bombing System Calc 3 could be used.

The Vulcan's only combat missions took place towards the end of the type's service in 1982. During the Falklands War, the Vulcan was deployed against Argentinian forces which had occupied the Falkland Islands. The missions performed by the Vulcan became known as the Black Buck raids, each aircraft had to fly 3,889 mi (6,259 km) from Ascension Island to reach Stanley on the Falklands. Victor tankers conducted the necessary air-to-air refuelling for the Vulcan to cover the distance involved; approximately 1,100,000 imp gal (5,000,000 L) of fuel was used in each mission.

Engineering work to prepare the five Vulcans that would conduct the missions began on 9 April. Each aircraft required modifications to the bomb bay, the reinstatement of the long-out-of-use in-flight refuelling system, the installation of a new navigational system derived from the Vickers VC10, and the updating of several onboard electronics. Underneath the wings, new pylons were fitted to carry an ECM pod and Shrike antiradar missiles at wing hardpoint locations.

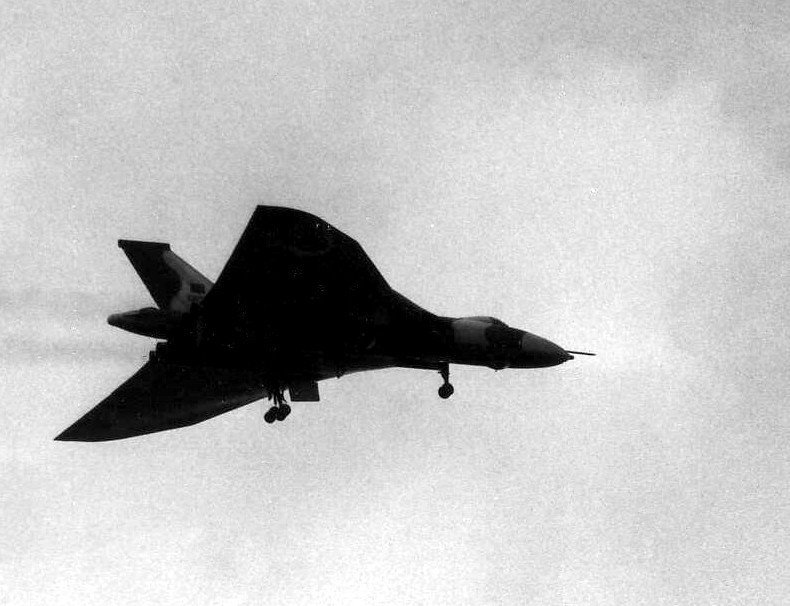
A Vulcan flying over Ascension Island on 18 May 1982

On 1 May, the first mission was conducted by a single Vulcan (XM607) that flew over Port Stanley and dropped its bombs on the airfield, concentrating on the single runway, with one direct hit, making it unsuitable for fighter aircraft. The Vulcan's mission was quickly followed up by strikes against anti-air installations, flown by British Aerospace Sea Harriers from Royal Navy aircraft carriers. A further two missions saw missiles launched against radar installations and two additional missions were cancelled. At the time, these missions held the record for the world's longest-distance raids. The Vulcans' ECM systems proved to be effective at jamming Argentine radars; while a Vulcan was within the theatre, other British aircraft in the vicinity had a reduced chance of coming under effective fire.

On 3 June 1982, Vulcan B.2 XM597 of No. 50 Squadron took part in the "Black Buck 6" mission against Argentinian radar sites at Stanley airfield on the Falkland Islands. While attempting to refuel for its return journey to Ascension Island, the probe broke, leaving the Vulcan with insufficient fuel, forcing a diversion to Galeão Air Force Base, Rio de Janeiro, in neutral Brazil. En route, secret papers were dumped along with the two remaining AGM-45 Shrike missiles, although one failed to launch. After a mayday call, the Vulcan, escorted by Brazilian Air Force Northrop F-5 fighters, was permitted an emergency landing at Rio with very little fuel left on board. The Vulcan and her crew were detained until the end of hostilities nine days later.

=== Reconnaissance ===
In November 1973, as a result of the planned closure of the Victor SR.2 equipped No. 543 Squadron, No. 27 Squadron reformed at RAF Scampton equipped with the Vulcan as a replacement in the maritime radar reconnaissance role. (Note: The other two squadrons of the Scampton Wing, No. 35 and 617 Squadron, also had a secondary maritime reconnaissance role.) The squadron carried out patrols of the seas around the British Isles, including the strategically important GIUK gap between Iceland and the United Kingdom, flying at high level and using the Vulcan's H2S radar to monitor shipping. In peacetime, this could be followed up by visual identification and photography of targets of interest at low level. In the event of war, a Vulcan would leave visual identification of potential targets to Buccaneers or Canberras and could coordinate attacks by Buccaneers against hostile shipping. Though initially equipped with a number of B.2 aircraft, the Squadron eventually operated nine B.2 (MRR) aircraft (also known by the unofficial designation SR.2). The aircraft were modified for the role by removing the TFR (and its thimble radome) and adding the LORAN C radio navigation aid. The main external visual difference was the presence of a gloss paint finish, with a light grey undersurface, to protect against sea spray.

The squadron also inherited its secondary role of air sampling from No. 543 Squadron. This involved flying through plumes of airborne contamination and using onboard equipment to collect fallout released from both above ground and underground nuclear tests for later analysis at the Atomic Weapons Research Establishment at Aldermaston. Five aircraft had small pylons fitted to the redundant Skybolt hardpoints, which could be used to carry sampling pods modified from drop tanks. (Note: Some sources state that the pods were modified from de Havilland Sea Vixen drop tanks. while others claim that they were based on Hawker Hunter tanks.) These pods would collect the needed samples on a filter, while an additional smaller "localiser" pod was fitted to the port wing, inboard of the main pylons.

The squadron disbanded at Scampton in March 1982, passing on its radar reconnaissance duties to the RAF's Nimrods.

=== Aerial refuelling role ===
After the end of the Falklands War in 1982, the Vulcan B.2 was due to be withdrawn from RAF service that year. The Falklands campaign, however, had consumed much of the airframe fatigue life of the RAF's Victor tankers. While Vickers VC10 tanker conversions had been ordered in 1979 and Lockheed TriStar tankers would be ordered after the conflict, as a stopgap measure six Vulcans were converted into single-point tankers. The Vulcan tanker conversion was accomplished by removing the jammers from the ECM bay in the tail of the aircraft and replacing them with a single hose drum unit. An additional cylindrical bomb-bay tank was fitted, giving a fuel capacity of almost 100,000 lb (45,000 kg).

The go-ahead for converting the six aircraft was given on 4 May 1982. Just 50 days after being ordered, the first Vulcan tanker, XH561, was delivered to RAF Waddington. The Vulcan K.2s were operated by No. 50 Squadron, along with three Vulcan B.2s, in support of UK air defence activities until it was disbanded in March 1984.

=== Vulcan Display Flight ===
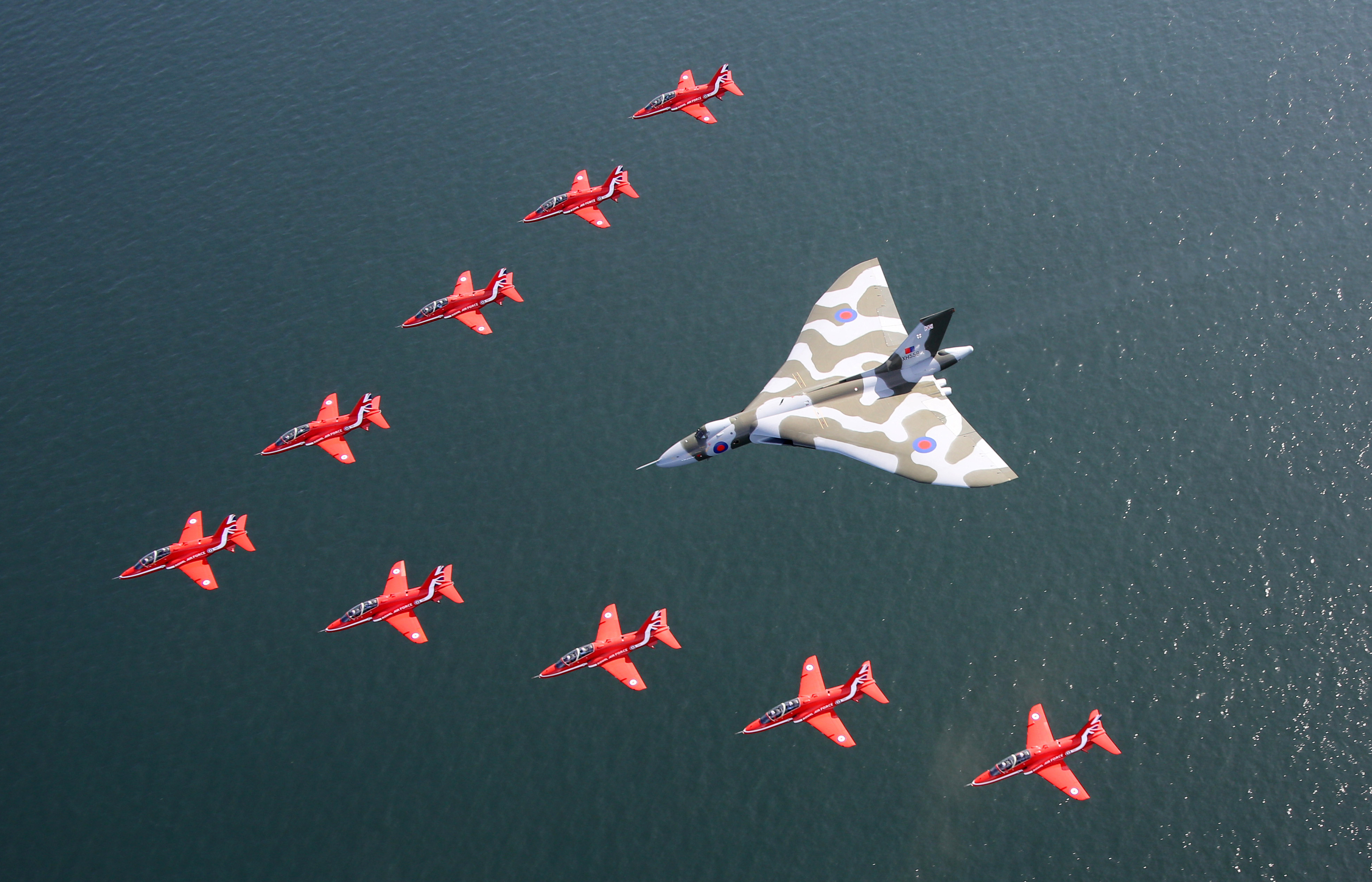
Vulcan B.2 in formation with the Red Arrows, 2015

After the disbandment of No. 50 Squadron, two Vulcans continued flying with the RAF in air displays as part of the Vulcan Display Flight, based at Waddington but administered through No. 55 Squadron, based at RAF Marham. Initially displaying using XL426, in 1986 that aircraft was sold, having been replaced by XH558, which began displays in 1985. The VDF continued with XH558 until 1992, finishing operations after the Ministry of Defence determined it was too costly to run in light of budget cuts. Both aircraft subsequently entered preservation and survived, although a third, XH560, kept in reserve in the first years, was later scrapped.

=== Engine test beds ===
- The first prototype VX770 had its Sapphire engines replaced with four 15,000 lbf (67 kN) Rolls-Royce Conway RCo.7 turbofans in 1957. It was transferred to Rolls-Royce as the Conway test bed. It flew with the Conways, the first turbofans in the world, until its fatal crash in September 1958.
- The first Vulcan B.1 XA889 was used for the flight clearances of the Olympus 102 and 104.
- Vulcan B.1 XA891 was fitted with four Olympus 200 engines in the spring of 1958 for intensive flying trials. The aircraft crashed in July 1958 during a routine test flight.
- Vulcan B.1 XA894 flew with five Olympus engines, the standard four Mk.101s, plus a reheated Olympus 320 destined for the BAC TSR-2 in an underslung nacelle. This aircraft was destroyed in a ground fire at Filton on 3 December 1962.
- Vulcan B.1 XA896 was withdrawn from RAF service in June 1964 and transferred to be converted to the test bed for the Bristol Siddeley BS100 vectored thrust turbofan for the Hawker Siddeley P.1154. The P.1154 was cancelled in February 1965 and XA896 was scrapped before being converted.
- Vulcan B.1 XA902 was withdrawn from RAF service after a landing accident in 1958. After rebuilding, it replaced VX770 as the Conway test bed, fitted with four RCo.11s. The two inner Conways were replaced with Rolls-Royce Speys, flying for the first time in this configuration on 12 October 1961.
- Vulcan B.1 XA903, surplus to Blue Steel trials, was converted to a similar layout to XA894 to flight test the Olympus 593 Concorde installation. The first flight was on 1 October 1966 and testing continued through to June 1971. In April 1973, XA903 started flying with an underslung Rolls-Royce RB.199 turbofan destined for the Panavia Tornado. XA903 was the last B.1 to fly, being retired in February 1979.
- Vulcan B.2 XH557 was used by BSEL for developing the Olympus 301 and first flew with the larger engine in May 1961. It was returned to Woodford in 1964 to be refurbished for the RAF.

== Variants ==
B.1
The initial production aircraft. The first few had straight leading edges, later retrofitted with phase 2 (kinked) wings. Early examples were finished in silver, later changed to "anti-flash" white. Many were converted to B.1A standard 1959–1963. The last few unmodified B.1s in RAF service with No. 230 OCU retired by 1966. Last flight by any B.1, an engine testbed XA903, March 1979.

B.1A
The B.1 with an ECM system in a new larger tail cone (as in B.2). Unlike the B.2, the B.1As did not undergo extensive wing strengthening for low-level flying and were withdrawn from service 1966–67.

B.2
Developed version of the B.1. Larger, thinner wing than the B.1 (Phase 2C wing) and fitted with Olympus 201-202 engines, or Olympus 301 engines. Uprated electrics with AAPP and Ram Air Turbine (RAT). ECM similar to B.1A. TFR in nose thimble radome fitted to most aircraft in the mid-60s. New Radar warning receiver aerials on tail fin giving it a square top from the mid-1970s. (Note: Some sources have attested to the existence of a Vulcan B.2A. This designation supposedly referred either to Vulcan B.2s fitted with Olympus Mk 301 engines or those modified to carry the Blue Steel missile. However, irrespective of the role or engine fit, the B.2 was the only official designation except for the MRR and tanker variants.)

B.2 (MRR)
Nine B.2s converted to maritime radar reconnaissance (MRR). TFR deleted. Five aircraft were further modified for the air sampling role. Distinctive gloss finish with light grey underside.

K.2
Six B.2s converted for air-to-air refuelling with Mark 17 hose drum unit (HDU) mounted semi-recessed in the tail cone. TFR deleted. Fitted with three bomb-bay drum tanks, it was the only mark of Vulcan that could jettison fuel in an emergency.

B.3
Proposed version, intended as a long-endurance missile carrier capable of carrying up to six Skybolt missiles on flights of up to 12 hours duration. Never built.

=== Production ===
A total of 134 production Vulcans were assembled at Woodford Aerodrome, 45 to the B.1 design and 89 were B.2 models, the last being delivered to the RAF in January 1965.

Contract date	Quantity	Variant	Notes
6 Jul 1948	2	Prototypes	Two prototypes were delivered in Aug 1952 and Sep 1953
14 Aug 1952	25	Vulcan B.1	First flight of production aircraft 4 Feb 1955, delivered between Jun 1955 and Dec 1957
30 Sep 1954	20	Vulcan B.1	Delivered between Jan 1958 and Apr 1959
30 Sep 1954	17	Vulcan B.2	Delivered between Sep 1959 and Dec 1960
31 Mar 1955	8	Vulcan B.2	Delivered between Jan and May 1961
25 Feb 1956	24	Vulcan B.2	Delivered between Jul 1961 and Nov 1962
22 Jan 1958	40	Vulcan B.2	Delivered between Feb 1963 and Jan 1965, one aircraft not flown and used as a static test airframe
Total	136		

== Operators ==
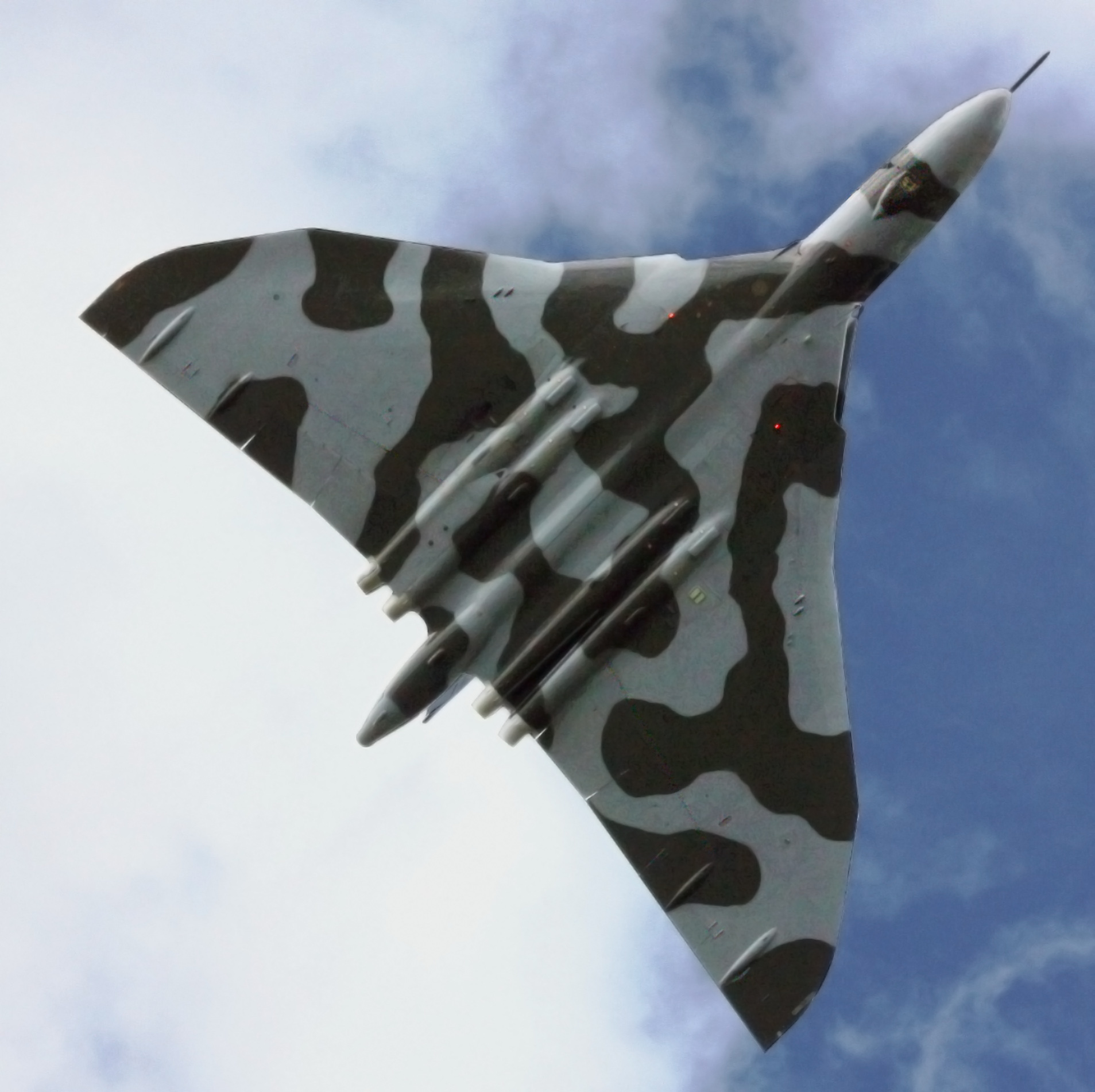
The Vulcan to the Sky Trust's Avro Vulcan XH558

United Kingdom

- Aeroplane and Armament Experimental Establishment aircraft used for trials and evaluation
- Royal Air Force
  - 9 squadron (B.2 from 1962 to 1982)
  - 12 squadron (B.2 from 1962 to 1967)
  - 27 squadron (B.2 from 1961 to 1972 and the B.2 (MRR) from 1973 to 1982)
  - 35 squadron (B.2 from 1962 to 1982)
  - 44 squadron (B.1/B.1A from 1960 to 1967 and the B.2 from 1966 to 1982)
  - 50 squadron (B.1/B.1A from 1961 to 1966, the B.2 from 1966 to 1984 and the K.2 from 1982 to 1984)
  - 83 squadron (the first Vulcan squadron operated the B.1/B.1A from 1957 to 1960 and the B.2 from 1960 to 1969)
  - 101 squadron (B.1/B1A from 1957 to 1967 and the B.2 from 1967 to 1982)
  - 617 squadron (OB.1/B1A from 1958 to 1961 and the B.2 from 1961 to 1981)
  - 230 OCU from 1956 to 1981. The first unit to operate the Vulcan, it provided conversion and operational training for Vulcan aircrew
  - Bomber Command Development Unit
- Vulcan To The Sky Trust (G-VLCN, formerly XH558, flying until 2015) based at Doncaster Sheffield Airport) until June 2023
- Aircraft were also operated at various times under the direction of the Ministry of Supply/Aviation for trials and evaluation by Avro, Bristol Siddeley Engines, Rolls-Royce and the Blind Landing Experimental Unit (BLEU)

=== Bases ===
- RAF Akrotiri in Cyprus: two B.2 squadrons from 1969 to 1975
  - 9 Squadron 1969–1975, moved from Cottesmore in 1969 it returned to the UK in 1975 to Waddington.
  - 35 Squadron 1969–1975, moved from Cottesmore in 1969 it returned to the UK in 1975 to Scampton.
- RAF Coningsby: three squadrons from 1962 to 1964
  - 9 Squadron 1962–1964, formed in 1962 to operate the B.2 it moved to Cottesmore in 1964.
  - 12 Squadron 1962–1964, formed in 1962 to operate the B.2 it moved to Cottesmore in 1964.
  - 35 Squadron 1962–1964, formed in 1962 to operate the B.2 it moved to Cottesmore in 1964.

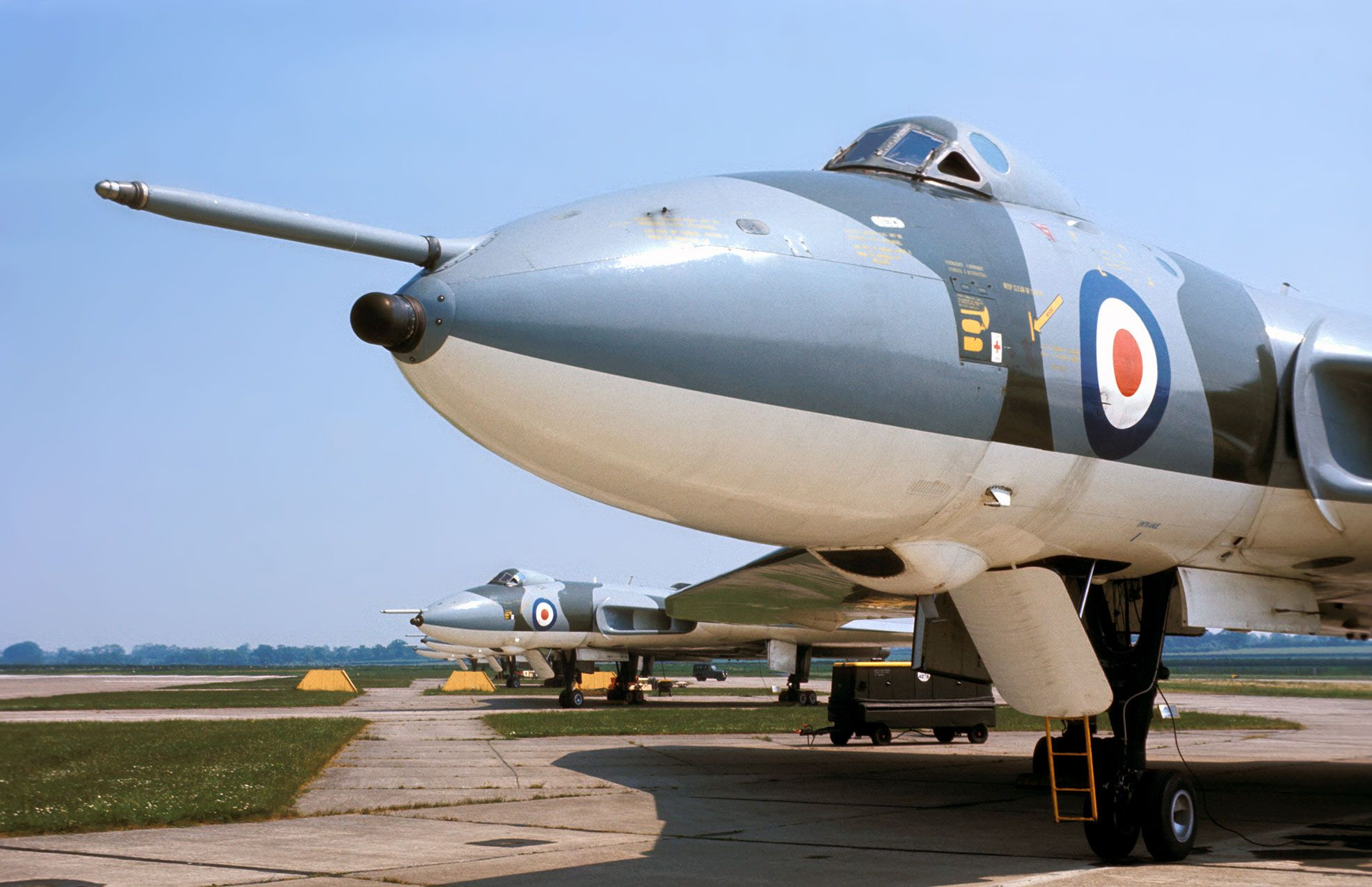
Avro Vulcans of No 617 Squadron at RAF Cottesmore circa 1975

- RAF Cottesmore: three squadrons from 1964 to 1969
  - 9 Squadron 1964–1969, moved in from Coningsby in 1964, it moved to Akrotiri in 1969.
  - 12 Squadron 1964–1967, moved in from Coningsby in 1964 until it disbanded in 1967.
  - 35 Squadron 1964–1969, moved in from Coningsby in 1964, it moved to Akrotiri 1969.
- RAF Finningley
  - 101 Squadron 1957–1961, formed in 1957 to be the second operational B.1 squadron, moved to Waddington in 1961.
  - 230 OCU 1961–1969, moved from Waddington in 1961, moved to Scampton in 1969.
- RAF Scampton: four squadrons at different times between 1961 and 1982
  - 27 Squadron 1961–1972, formed in 1961 to operate the B.2 until it disbanded in 1972. Reformed in 1973 to operate the B.2 (MRR) variant until 1982.
  - 35 Squadron 1975–1982, moved from Akrotiri in 1975 and operated the B.2 until it disbanded in March 1982.
  - 83 Squadron 1960–1969, a former B.1/B.1A squadron at Waddington, reformed in 1960 to operate the B.2 until disbanded in 1969.
  - 617 Squadron 1958–1981, formed in 1958 to operate the B.1, reformed to operate the B.2 in 1961 until disbanded in 1981.
  - 230 OCU 1969–1981, moved from Finningley in 1969 until disbanded in 1981.
- RAF Waddington: a number of squadrons at different times between 1957 and 1984, it was the first and last operational Vulcan base
  - 9 Squadron 1975–1982, moved in from Akrotiri in 1975 until it was disbanded in 1982.
  - 44 Squadron 1960–1982, formed in 1960 to operate the B.1/B.1A, it converted to the B.2 in 1966 and disbanded in 1982.
  - 50 Squadron 1961–1984, formed in 1961 to operate the B.1/B.1A, it converted to the B.2 in 1966, from 1982 it also flew the tanker version until disbanding in 1984.
  - 83 Squadron 1957–1960, formed in 1957 to be the first operational squadron to operate the B.1 until 1960, it reformed at Scampton later in the year as a B.2 unit.
  - 101 Squadron 1961–1982, moved from Finningley in 1961 with the B.1/B.1A, converted to B.2 in 1967 and disbanded in 1982.
  - 230 OCU 1956–1961, formed in 1956 to train Vulcan crews it moved to Finningley in 1961. A final move to RAF Scampton was made in 1970.

=== V-Bomber dispersal airfields ===
In the event of transition to war, the V Bomber squadrons were to deploy four aircraft at short notice to each of 26 pre-prepared dispersal airfields around the United Kingdom. In the early 1960s the RAF ordered 20 Beagle Basset communication aircraft to move the crews to dispersal airfields; the importance of these aircraft was only brief, diminishing when the primary nuclear deterrent switched to the Royal Navy's Polaris (UK nuclear programme).

== Accidents and incidents ==
External image
- Vulcan B.1 XA897 prior to the accident, stopping over at RAF Khormaksar

- On 1 October 1956, Vulcan B.1 XA897, the first to be delivered, crashed at London Heathrow Airport during Operation Tasman Flight, a flag-waving trip to Australia and New Zealand. After a ground-controlled approach in bad weather, it struck the ground 700 yd (640 m) short of the runway just as engine power was applied. The impact probably broke the drag links on the main undercarriage, allowing the undercarriage to be forced backwards and damaged the wing's trailing edge. After the initial impact, XA897 rose back in the air. The pilot, Squadron Leader D. R. Howard, and co-pilot Air Marshal Sir Harry Broadhurst, AOC-in-C Bomber Command, both ejected and survived, the other four occupants (including a spare pilot and an Avro representative) were killed when the aircraft hit the ground again and broke up.
- In 1957, a Vulcan B.1 XA892 attached to the A&AEE at Boscombe Down for acceptance testing was unintentionally flown to an indicated Mach number (IMN) above 1.04, alerting the crew that it had reached supersonic speed. XA892's commander, Flt Lt Milt Cottee (RAAF), and co-pilot, Flt Lt Ray Bray (RAF), were tasked to fly at 478 mph (769 km/h) and 0.98 IMN, taking the aircraft to a load factor of 3 g. It climbed to 35,000 ft (11,000 m) and then dived, intending to reach the target speed at 27,000 ft (8,200 m). Approaching the target altitude, the throttles were closed and full up-elevator applied, but XA892 continued to pitch nose-down. Cottee contemplated pushing forward to go inverted and then rolling upright; instead, he opened the speed brakes. Although the airspeed was above their maximum operating speed, the speed brakes were undamaged and did slow the aircraft, which came back past the vertical at about 18,000 ft (5,500 m) and levelled off at 8,000 ft (2,400 m). No sonic boom was reported, so a true Mach number of 1.0 was unlikely to have been reached. (Note: When flying at a speed of Mach 1.0, the Vulcan suffered a position error of about 0.07.) Afterwards, a rear bulkhead was found to be deformed.

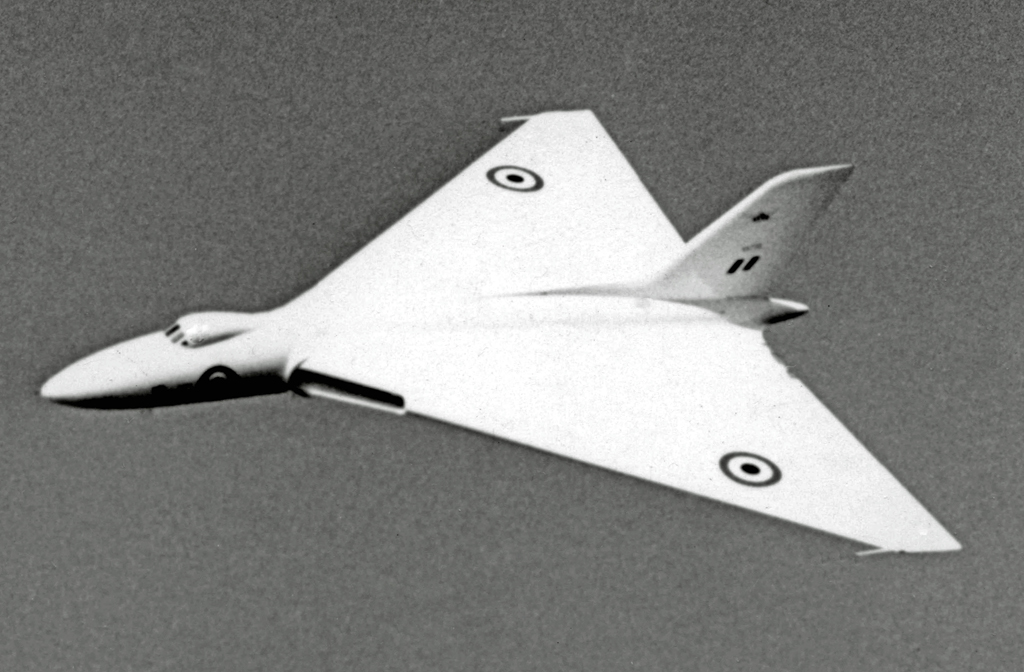
The prototype Vulcan VX770 in 1954, retaining the original "pure delta" wing shape

- On 20 September 1958, prototype Vulcan VX770 was flown by a Rolls-Royce test pilot on an engine-performance sortie with a flypast at RAF Syerston Battle of Britain At Home display. It flew along the main runway then started a roll to starboard and climbed slightly, during which the starboard wing disintegrated and the main spar collapsed. VX770 went into a dive with the starboard wing on fire and struck the ground, killing three occupants of a controllers' caravan and all four crew on board. Proposed causes of the structural failure have included pilot error, metal fatigue due to air intake vibration, and inadequate maintenance. (Note: Avro Chief Test Pilot Tony Blackman notes that when Avro display pilots carried out aerobatics, the displays were followed by a careful but little-known inspection of the inside of the wing's leading edge. Rolls-Royce pilots also carried out aerobatics, but Blackman speculates that Rolls-Royce did not know of the inspections, and VX770 may have already been severely structurally damaged.)
- On 24 October 1958, Vulcan B.1 XA908 of No. 83 Squadron crashed east of Detroit, Michigan, USA. A complete electrical failure occurred around 30,000 ft (9,100 m). The backup system should have provided 20 minutes of emergency power, allowing XA908 to reach one of several airports in the area, but backup power lasted only three minutes due to a short circuit in the service busbar, locking the controls. Bound for Lincoln AFB in Nebraska, XA908 went into a steep dive before crashing, leaving a forty-foot (12 m) crater in the ground, which was later excavated while retrieving wreckage. Despite extensive property damage, there were no ground fatalities and only one hospitalisation. All six crew members were killed, including the co-pilot, who had ejected. The co-pilot's ejection seat was found in Lake St Clair, but his body was not recovered until the following spring. They were buried at Oak Ridge Cemetery in Trenton, Michigan, alongside 11 RAF student pilots killed during the Second World War in accidents at nearby Naval Air Station Grosse Ile.
- On 24 July 1959, Vulcan B.1 XA891 crashed due to an electrical failure during an engine test. Shortly after takeoff, the crew observed generator warning lights and loss of busbar voltage. The aircraft commander, Avro Chief Test Pilot Jimmy Harrison, climbed XA891 to 14,000 ft (4,300 m), steering away from the airfield and populated areas, while the AEO attempted to solve the problem. When it became clear that control would not be regained, Harrison instructed the rear compartment crew to exit the aircraft and the co-pilot to eject, before ejecting himself. All the crew survived, making them the first complete Vulcan crew to successfully escape. The aircraft crashed near Kingston upon Hull.
- On 26 October 1959, Vulcan B.1 XH498 participated in an airshow marking the opening of Wellington International Airport, formerly Rongotai Airport. After a "touch-and-go landing" on Runway 34, it came around for a full-stop landing. Turbulence and wind shear caused XH498 to land short of the runway threshold. The port undercarriage leg clipped the embankment at the Moa point or southern end, damaging wing attachments, engine fuel lines, and the main landing gear drag link, which was ruptured and unable to support the aircraft. The port wing tip nearly scraped the runway surface before it was able to lift off again, spilling fuel over the crowd. Pilot actions prevented a possible disaster as spectators were present on the western apron. XH498 flew to RNZAF Ohakea for a safe emergency landing on just the nose and starboard landing gear with little further damage. A UK repair team returned it to airworthiness; on 4 January 1960, XH498 departed, remaining in service until 19 October 1967.
- On 16 September 1960, Vulcan B.2 XH557 damaged the "Runway Garage" at Filton. XH557 had been allocated to Bristol Siddeley Engines to test the Olympus 301 engine and was being delivered to Filton. Approaching in poor weather conditions, the aircraft touched down halfway along the runway. The braking parachute was streamed, but realising the aircraft would not stop in time, the captain opened the throttles to go round. The Runway Garage took the full force of the jet blast and property damage was sustained; four petrol pumps were blown flat, a streetlight on the A38 was knocked down, railings were blown over, and multiple cars had their windscreens shattered. The aircraft diverted to St. Mawgan, flying into Filton days later.
- On 12 June 1963, Vulcan B.1A XH477 of No. 50 Squadron crashed in Aberdeenshire, Scotland. During a low-level exercise, the Vulcan was flown into terrain. All five crewmembers were killed.
- On 11 May 1964, Vulcan B.2 XH535 crashed in Wiltshire during a demonstration flight from Boscombe Down. The aircraft entered a spin while a very low speed and high rate of descent were being demonstrated. The landing parachute was deployed, stopping the spin briefly before it began to spin again. Around 2,500 ft (760 m), the aircraft commander instructed the crew to abandon the aircraft. The commander and co-pilot ejected successfully, but none of the rear compartment crew did so, presumably due to the g forces in the spin.
- On 16 July 1964, Vulcan B.1A XA909 crashed in Anglesey after a mid-air explosion caused both No. 3 and No. 4 engines to be shut down. The explosion was caused by the failure of a bearing in No. 4 engine. The starboard wing was extensively damaged, the pilot had insufficient aileron power, and both airspeed indications were highly inaccurate. The whole crew successfully abandoned XA909 and was found within a few minutes and rescued.
- On 7 October 1964, Vulcan B.2 XM601 crashed during an overshoot from an asymmetric power practice approach at Coningsby. The co-pilot had executed the asymmetric power approach with two engines producing thrust and two at idle. He was being checked by the squadron commander, who was unfamiliar with the aircraft. When he commenced the overshoot, the copilot moved all the throttles to full power. The engines that had been producing power reached full power more quickly than the engines at idle and the resultant asymmetric thrust exceeded the available rudder authority, causing the aircraft to spin and crash. All the crew perished.
- On 25 May 1965, Vulcan B.2 XM576 crash-landed at Scampton, causing it to be written off within a year of delivery.
- On 11 February 1966, Vulcan B.2 XH536 of IX SQN Cottesmore Wing crashed in the Brecon Beacons during a low-level exercise. The aircraft struck the ground at 1,910 ft (580 m) near the summit of Fan Bwlch Chwyth 1,978 ft (603 m), 20 mi (32 km) northeast of Swansea. All crew members died. Hilltops at the time were snow-covered and cloud extended down to 1,400 ft (430 m).
- On 6 April 1967, Vulcan B.2 XL385 burnt out on the runway at RAF Scampton at the beginning of its take-off run. The aircraft was carrying a Blue Steel missile training round. All the crew, including an Air Training Corps cadet, escaped unhurt. The aircraft was engulfed in flames and totally destroyed. The accident was caused by the failure of an Olympus 301 HP turbine disc as the engine reached full power.
- On 30 January 1968, Vulcan B.2 XM604 crashed at Burley, Rutland following a loss of control during an overshoot at RAF Cottesmore. The rear crew members were killed, though both pilots ejected. The captain ejected at a very late stage and only survived because his deploying parachute was snagged by some power cables. The accident was caused by the failure of an Olympus 301 LP turbine disc after the aircraft had returned to the airfield following indications of a bomb-bay overheat.
- On 7 January 1971, Vulcan B.2 XM610 of No.44 Squadron crashed due to a blade fatigue failure in the No. 1 engine, damaging the fuel system and causing a fire. The crew abandoned the aircraft safely, after which it crashed harmlessly in Wingate.
- On 14 October 1975, Vulcan B.2 XM645 of No.9 Squadron lost its left undercarriage and damaged the airframe when it undershot the runway at RAF Luqa in Malta. The aircraft broke up over the town of Żabbar while turning inbound for an emergency landing. The pilot and co-pilot escaped using their ejection seats, the other five crew members were killed. Large aircraft pieces fell on the town; one woman, Vincenza Zammit, was killed by an electric cable, and some 20 others were injured.
- On 17 January 1977, Vulcan B.2 XM600 of No. 101 Squadron crashed near Spilsby, Lincolnshire. During a practice emergency descent, the bomb-bay fire warning light flashed on followed by No.2 engine fire warning light. The captain shut the engine down and the AEO reported flames coming from the area of No.2 engine, just behind the deployed ram air turbine (RAT). As the fire intensified, the captain ordered the aircraft to be abandoned. The three rear crew members escaped around 6,000 ft (1,800 m). After ordering the co-pilot to eject, the captain ejected at around 3,000 ft (910 m), as control was lost. The cause was due to arcing on the RAT's electrical terminals, burning a hole in an adjacent fuel pipe and setting the fuel on fire.
- On 12 August 1978, Vulcan B.2 XL390 of No. 617 Squadron crashed during an air display at Naval Air Station Glenview, Illinois, in the United States. The crew had been authorized to carry out a display at Chicago's Meigs Field airport; the captain had elected to carry out an unauthorized display at Glenview beforehand. After a low-level run, probably below 100 ft (30 m), the aircraft pulled up for an improperly executed wingover, resulting in a low-level stall and crash, killing all on board.
- On 3 June 1982, Vulcan XM597 broke its probe while attempting to refuel in flight, while returning from a mission over the Falkland Islands. With insufficient fuel to reach its base on Ascension Island, the crew discarded classified information over the Atlantic Ocean and diverted to Rio de Janeiro. Shortly after entering Brazilian airspace, the Brazilian Air Force sent two Northrop F-5s to escort it to Galeão Air Force Base. This led to high-level diplomatic talks between the UK and Brazil, which remained neutral during the Falklands War. After seven days of detention, the Vulcan and its crew were allowed to return home on the condition that XM597 play no further part in the conflict.
- On 28 May 2012, Vulcan B.2 XH558 suffered a failure of the two port engines while starting a take-off roll from Robin Hood Airport, Doncaster. Bags of silica gel desiccant had been inadvertently left in the air intake after maintenance. Less than a second after increasing power from 80% to 100%, these were ingested by one of the port engines, immediately destroying it. The remaining port engine ingested debris from the first engine, destroying this one, as well. The fire-prevention systems proved effective, neither the airframe nor control systems suffered damage. The pilot had no difficulty bringing the aircraft to a safe stop, having remained on the ground throughout. On 3 July 2012, XH558 returned to flight.

== Surviving aircraft ==
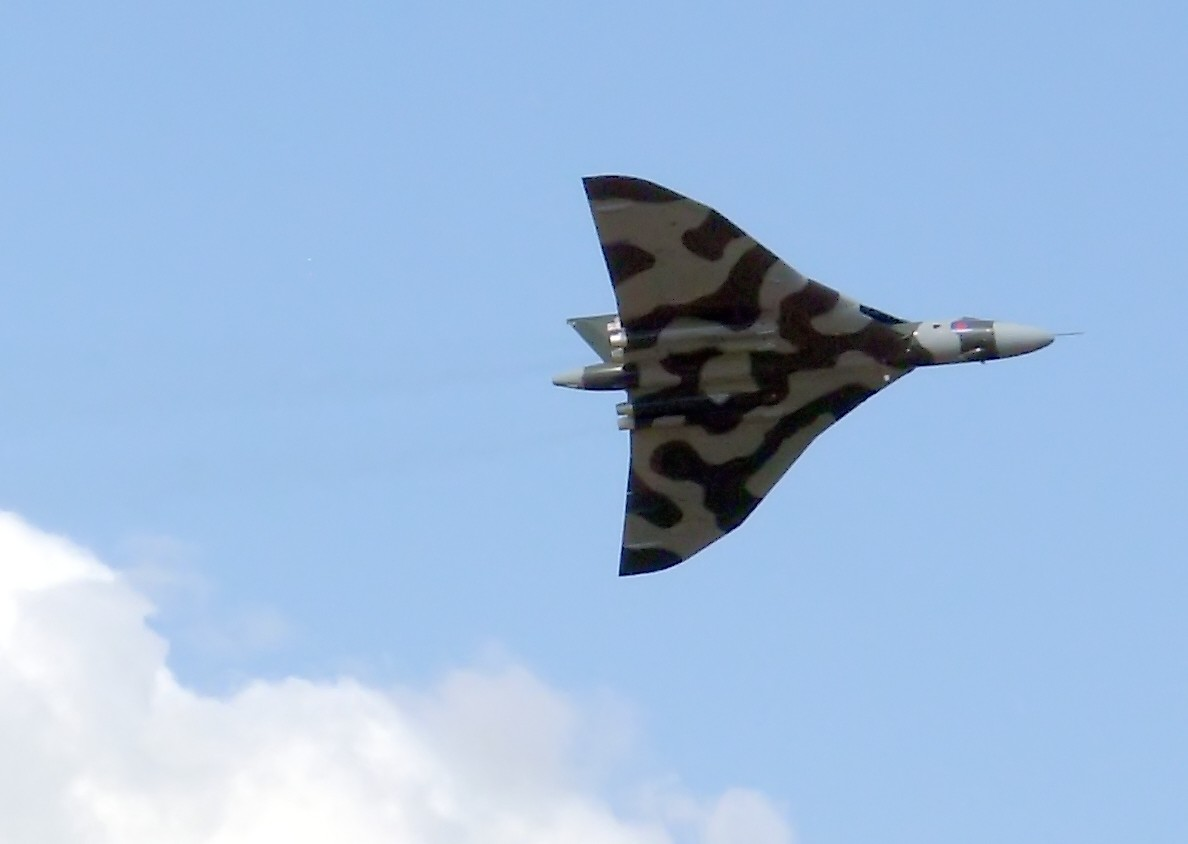
XH558 performs its first post-restoration public display on 5 July 2008

Several Vulcans survive, housed in museums in both the United Kingdom and North America (USA and Canada). One Vulcan, XH558 (G-VLCN) Spirit of Great Britain, was used as a display aircraft by the RAF as part of the Vulcan Display Flight until 1993. After being grounded, it was later restored to flight by the Vulcan To The Sky Trust and displayed as a civilian aircraft from 2008 until 2015, before being retired a second time for engineering reasons. In retirement, XH558 is to be retained at its base at Doncaster Sheffield Airport as a taxiable aircraft, a role already performed by two other survivors, XL426 (G-VJET) based at Southend Airport, and XM655 (G-VULC), based at Wellesbourne Mountford Airfield. XJ823, a B.2, can be seen at the Solway Aviation Museum at Carlisle Lake District Airport. XM607 is currently being restored at RAF Waddington, where it has been gate guardian since being retired. XM594 is on display at the Newark Air Museum, Newark, Nottinghamshire, England. XM573 is on display at the Strategic Air Command Museum, Ashland, Nebraska.

== Specifications (B.1) ==
Vulcan B.2

Data from Polmar, Laming

General characteristics

- Crew: 5 (pilot, co-pilot, AEO, navigator radar, navigator plotter) (Note: Two extra seats could be fitted for crew chiefs, for a total of seven crew.)
- Length: 97 ft 1 in (29.59 m)
- Wingspan: 99 ft 5 in (30.30 m)
- Height: 26 ft 6 in (8.08 m)
- Wing area: 3,554 sq ft (330.2 m^{2})
- Airfoil: root: NACA 0010 mod.; tip: NACA 0008 mod.
- Empty weight: 83,573 lb (37,908 kg) equipped and crewed
- Max takeoff weight: 170,000 lb (77,111 kg)
- Fuel capacity: 9,280 imp gal (11,140 US gal; 42,200 L); 74,240 lb (33,675 kg)
- Powerplant: 4 × Bristol Olympus Mk.101 / Mk.102 / Mk.104 twin-spool turbojet engines, 11,000 lbf (49 kN) thrust each

Performance

- Maximum speed: 561 kn (646 mph, 1,039 km/h) at altitude
- Maximum speed: Mach 0.96
- Cruise speed: 493 kn (567 mph, 913 km/h) / M0.86 at 45,000 feet (14,000 m)
- Range: 2,265 nmi (2,607 mi, 4,195 km)
- Service ceiling: 56,000 ft (17,000 m)
- Thrust/weight: 0.31

Armament

- 21 × 1,000 pounds (454 kg) of conventional bombs
- 1 × Blue Danube nuclear gravity bomb
- 1 × Violet Club 400 kt nuclear gravity bomb
- 1 × U.S. Mark 5 nuclear gravity bomb supplied under Project E
- 1 × Yellow Sun Mk.1 400 kt nuclear gravity bomb
- 1 × Yellow Sun Mk.2 1.1 Mt thermonuclear gravity bomb
- 1 × Red Beard nuclear gravity bomb
- 1 × WE.177B parachute-retarded nuclear gravity bomb

=== Comparison of variants ===
Variants compared
	B.1	B.1A	B.2	B.2 (MRR)	K.2
Wingspan	99 ft 5 in (30.30 m)		111 ft 0 in (33.83 m)		
Length	97 ft 1 in (29.59 m)	105 ft 6 in (32.16 m) [99 ft 11 in (30.45 m) without probe]			
Height	26 ft 6 in (8.08 m)		27 ft 1 in (8.26 m)		
Wing area	3,554 sq ft (330.2 m^{2})		3,964 sq ft (368.3 m^{2})		
Max. takeoff weight	167,000 lb (76,000 kg); 185,000 lb (84,000 kg) (operational necessity)		204,000 lb (93,000 kg)		
Cruising speed	Mach 0.86 indicated				
Max. speed	Mach 0.95 indicated		Mach 0.93 indicated (Mach 0.92 with 301 engines)	Mach 0.93 indicated	Unknown
Service ceiling	56,000 ft		45,000 ft to 60,000 ft (Note: Depended upon oxygen equipment fitted. No airframe limitation on height.)		
Electrical system	112 V DC		115/200 V AC 3-phase 400 Hz		
Emergency electrical system	Battery		Ram air turbine and Airborne Auxiliary Power Plant		
Engines	4 × Bristol; Olympus 101, 102 or 104	4 × Bristol; Olympus 104	4 × Bristol Siddeley; Olympus 200-series, 301	4 × Bristol Siddeley; Olympus 200-series	
Fuel capacity (main)	9,280 imp gal (11,140 US gal; 42,200 L) / 74,240 lb (33,675 kg) avtur) (Note: At specific gravity of .8 (8lb/gal).)		9,260 imp gal (11,120 US gal; 42,100 L) / 74,080 lb (33,602 kg)		
Fuel capacity (bomb bay)	None		0–1,990 imp gal (0–2,390 US gal; 0–9,047 L) / 0–15,920 lb (0–7,221 kg)	1,990 imp gal (2,390 US gal; 9,000 L) / 15,920 lb (7,221 kg) (Note: 2 × 995 imp gal (1,195 US gal; 4,520 L) cylindrical tanks.)	2,985 imp gal (3,585 US gal; 13,570 L) / 23,880 lb (10,832 kg) (Note: 3 × 995 imp gal (1,195 US gal; 4,520 L) cylindrical tanks.)
Powered flying controls	1 × rudder (duplex), 4 × elevators, 4 × ailerons		1 × rudder (duplex), 8 × elevons		
Armament	1 × free-fall nuclear bomb or 21 × 1,000 lb (450 kg) conventional bombs		1 × Blue Steel missile or 1 × free-fall nuclear bomb or 21 × 1,000 lb (450 kg) conventional bombs	None	

== See also ==
Aircraft of comparable role, configuration, and era

- Boeing B-47 Stratojet
- Handley Page Victor
- Tupolev Tu-16/Xian H-6
- Vickers Valiant

Related lists

- List of aircraft of the Royal Air Force
- List of bomber aircraft
- List of surviving Avro Vulcans
- List of V Bomber dispersal bases
- List of tanker aircraft

== Sources ==
- Baxter, Alan (1990). Olympus: The First Forty Years. Derby, UK: Rolls-Royce Heritage Trust. ISBN 978-0-9511710-9-7.
- Blackman, Tony (2007). Vulcan Test Pilot: My Experiences in the Cockpit of a Cold War Icon. London, UK: Grub Street. ISBN 978-1-904943-88-4.
- Braybrook, Roy (1982). Battle for the Falklands: Air Forces. Oxford, UK: Osprey Publishing. ISBN 0-85045-493-X.
- Brookes, Andrew (2011). Victor Units of the Cold War: Osprey Combat Aircraft: 88. Oxford, UK: Osprey Publishing. ISBN 978-1-84908-339-3.
- Brookes, Andrew; Davey, Chris (2009). Vulcan Units of The Cold War (Osprey Combat Aircraft: 72). Oxford, UK: Osprey Publishing. ISBN 978-1-84603-297-4.
- Bull, Stephen (2004). Encyclopedia of Military Technology And Innovation. Santa Barbara, California: Greenwood Publishing Group. ISBN 978-1-57356-557-8.
- Bulman, Craig (2001). The Vulcan B.Mk2 From a Different Angle. Bishop Auckland, UK: Pentland Press Ltd. ISBN 978-1-85821-899-1.
- Buttler, Tony (2003). British Secret Projects: Jet Bombers Since 1949. Hinckley, Leicestershire, UK: Midland. ISBN 1-85780-130-X.
- Darling, Kev (1999). Avro Vulcan. North Branch, USA: Speciality Press. ISBN 1-58007-023-X.
- Darling, Kev (2007). Avro Vulcan, Part One (RAF Illustrated). Vale of Glamorgan, Wales, UK: Big Bird Aviation Publication. ISBN 978-1-84799-237-6.
- Frawley, Gerard (2002). The International Directory of Military Aircraft, 2002–2003. Fyshwick, ACT, Australia: Aerospace Publications. ISBN 1-875671-55-2.
- Gallop, Alan (2005). Time Flies: Heathrow at 60. Stroud, UK: Sutton Publishing. ISBN 0-7509-3840-4.
- Gibson, Chris (2011). Vulcan's Hammer: V-Force Aircraft and Weapons Projects Since 1945. Crowborough, UK: Hikoki Publications. ISBN 978-19021-0917-6.
- Halpenny, Bruce Barrymore (2006). Avro Vulcan: The History and Development of a Classic Jet. Barnsley, South Yorkshire, UK: Pen & Sword Aviation. ISBN 1-84415-426-2.
- Hamilton-Paterson, James (2010). Empire of the Clouds: When Britain's Aircraft Ruled the World. London, UK: Faber & Faber. ISBN 978-0-571-24794-3.
- Hearn, Chester G. (2007). Carriers in Combat: The Air War at Sea. London, UK: Stackpole Books. ISBN 978-0-8117-3398-4.
- Jackson, A. J. (1990). Avro Aircraft Since 1908, 2nd Edition. London, UK: Putnam Aeronautical Books. ISBN 0-85177-834-8.
- Jackson, Robert (1984). Avro Vulcan. Somerset, UK: Patrick Stephens Ltd. ISBN 0-850-59630-0.
- Jackson, Robert (1987). Avro Vulcan. Somerset, UK: Patrick Stephens Ltd. ISBN 1852600101.
- Jackson, Robert (1986). Combat Aircraft Prototypes since 1945. Arco/Prentice Hall Press. ISBN 0-671-61953-5.
- Jackson, Robert (1986). V-Force Britain's Airborne Nuclear Deterrent. Shepperton, UK: Ian Allan Publishing. ISBN 0-711-02750-1.
- Jefford, C.G. (2001). RAF Squadrons: A Comprehensive Record of the Movement and Equipment of all RAF Squadrons and their Antecedents since 1912. Shrewsbury, Shropshire, UK: Airlife Publishing. ISBN 1-84037-141-2.
- Jenkins, Dennis R. (1999). B-1 Lancer: The Most Complicated Warplane Ever Developed. New York, US: McGraw-Hill. ISBN 0-07-134694-5.
- Jones, Barry (2007). V-Bombers: Valiant, Victor and Vulcan. Ramsbury, UK: The Crowood Press. ISBN 978-1-86126-945-4.
- Kingsley, Simon; Quegan, Shaun (1999). Understanding Radar Systems. Raleigh, North Carolina: SciTech Publishing. ISBN 1-891121-05-7.
- Lake, Alan (1999). Flying Units of the RAF: The Ancestry, Formation and Disbandment of all Flying Units since 1912. Shrewsbury, Shropshire, UK: Airlife Publishing. ISBN 1-84037-086-6.
- Laming, Tim (2002). The Vulcan Story: 1952–2002. Enderby, Leicester, UK: Silverdale Books. ISBN 1-85605-701-1.
- Polmar, Norman; Bell, Dana (2004). One Hundred Years of World Military Aircraft. Annapolis, Maryland: Naval Institute Press. ISBN 1-59114-686-0.
- Price, Alfred; Blackman, Tony; Edmondson, Andrew (2010). Avro Vulcan Manual: An Insight into Owning, Restoring, Servicing and Flying Britain's Legendary Cold War Bomber (Owner's Workshop Manual). Sparkford, Somerset, UK: Haynes. ISBN 978-1-84425-831-4.
- Richardson, Doug (2001). Stealth Warplanes. North Branch, Minnesota: Zenith Imprint. ISBN 0-7603-1051-3.
- Seddon, J.; Goldsmith, E. L. (1999). Intake Aerodynamics (Aiaa Education Series). Reston, Virginia: American Institute of Aeronautics and Astronautics. ISBN 1-56347-361-5.
- Segell, Glen (1997). Wither or dither: British Aerospace Collaborative Procurement with Europe. London, UK: Glen Segell Publishers. ISBN 1-901414-03-5.
- Stephens, Alan (1992). Power Plus Attitude: Ideas, Strategy and Doctrine in the Royal Australian Air Force, 1921–1991. Canberra, Australia: AGPS Press. ISBN 0-644-24388-0.
- Vulcan B.Mk.1A Pilot's Notes (AP 4505C–PN). London, UK: Air Ministry. 1961.
- Vulcan B.Mk.2 Aircrew Manual (AP101B-1902-15). London, UK: Air Ministry. 1984.
- Wansbrough-White, Gordon (1995). Names With Wings: The Names & Naming Systems of Aircraft & Engines Flown by the British Armed Forces 1878–1984. Shrewsbury, UK: Airlife Publishing Ltd. ISBN 1-85310-491-4.
- White, Rowland (2006). Vulcan 607: The Epic Story of the Most Remarkable British Air Attack since WWII. London, UK: Bantam Press. ISBN 0-593-05391-5.
- Willis, David (April 2007). "Avro Vulcan survivors". Aeroplane. Vol. 35, no. 4.
- Wilson, Stewart (1989). Lincoln, Canberra & F-111 in Australian service. Weston Creek, Australia: Aerospace Publications. ISBN 0-9587978-3-8.
- Wynn, Humphrey (1997). RAF Strategic Nuclear Deterrent Forces: Origins, Roles and Deployment 1946–1969. London, UK: The Stationery Office. ISBN 0-11-772833-0.
