= Vickers V-1000 =

Jet-powered cargo aircraft

V-1000

General information
- Type: Airliner and cargo aircraft prototype
- Manufacturer: Vickers-Armstrongs
- Status: Project cancelled
- Number built: 1

History
- First flight: Not flown

The Vickers-Armstrongs V-1000 was a proposed jet-powered cargo aircraft that was designed to meet a requirement issued by the British Ministry of Supply which sought a strategic transport for the Royal Air Force (RAF) to support its strategic bomber fleet, particularly the V-bombers. The design bears many similarities to the Vickers Valiant, one of the V-bombers, but also featured substantial changes. In addition to its military application, both the Ministry and Vickers also intended to use the same basic design as the VC7, a six-abreast trans-Atlantic jet airliner for British Overseas Airways Corporation (BOAC).

In 1955, by which point the prototype was already largely complete, the Ministry of Supply decided to terminate the V-1000 project in mid-development. By that time, the design had garnered interest from airlines, and had led to re-designs being conducted by competing US manufacturers, influencing the design of the Boeing 707 and Douglas DC-8. The V-1000 has been called one of the great "what-ifs" of British aviation, and its cancellation was the topic of considerable debate in the House of Commons.

We have handed to the Americans, without a struggle, the entire world market for big jet airliners.

— George Edwards, Vickers managing director,

== History ==
=== Background ===
During the early 1950s, Britain's civil aircraft industry was releasing and manufacturing a number of competitive and innovative aircraft designs. They include the de Havilland Comet, the world's first jet-powered commercial transport aircraft, the Vickers Viscount, the world's first turboprop-powered commercial airliner, and the Bristol Britannia, a turboprop-powered aircraft capable of conducting routine transatlantic flights. All of those designs had their origins in the specifications laid out by the wartime Brabazon Committee. With those aircraft, Britain appeared to be on track to capturing a large slice of the global demand for civil aircraft for the foreseeable future.

Meanwhile, the Royal Air Force (RAF) had been pursuing development of a new generation of strategic bombers: the Vickers Valiant, the Avro Vulcan, and the Handley Page Victor. Armed with nuclear weapons and powered by jet engines, those aircraft would be entering service during the 1950s as the V-bombers. The first of the V-bombers to enter service was the Valiant. Noting the favourable performance attributes of the Valiant, both the Ministry of Supply (MoS) and Vickers became interested in a prospective transport derivative, as a potential long-range successor to the smaller Comet. The RAF had also noticed a demand for a suitable transport aircraft capable of accompanying the V-bombers on deployments to any part of the world, carrying a mix of personnel and cargo needed for such deployments, while having similar speed and range capabilities to the bomber force.

Vickers received a request from the MoS for submissions of the Valiant transport derivative. At the same time, the British Overseas Airways Corporation (BOAC) was also interested in a potential commercial airliner from Vickers; thus, the company was naturally excited that it would be possible to develop an aircraft that would serve as both a military transport, being procured for the RAF, and as a commercial airliner, that BOAC would be expected to order. Such a move would mean increased financial support for the program as well as improved access to development and testing resources. According to aviation author Derek Wood, Sir George Edwards, who headed the design, viewed the military variant "as a stepping stone to the civil version", which was internally designated as the VC7.

Working in direct cooperation with BOAC throughout the studies performed for the project, Vickers came to quickly recognise that producing a suitable aircraft would not be a straightforward matter of simply pairing the Valiant's wings onto a new fuselage suitable for transport duties. Amongst the changes required would be an entirely new structure, the adoption of roomy and pressurised cabin, and more powerful engines. RAF requirements also provided some complications for the design, such as necessitating the use of double-slotted flaps to achieve the short field performance sought, along with the integration of a rear-mounted sizable hydraulic freight elevator for self-loading operations. Crucially, it was recognised that, in order for the aircraft to be economically viable against competing aircraft powered by turboprop engines and traditional piston engines, an engine capable of more thrust and superior specific fuel consumption than the Valiant's Rolls-Royce Avon turbojet engine would be necessary.

In October 1952, the MoS formally released Air Specification C.132D for the jet-powered transport. Various firms responded with their own submissions to meet the requirement. Handley Page offered the HP.97, which featured a two-level layout that moved the passenger seating above the wing of a design otherwise almost identical to the Victor. BOAC rejected the design, which led to the more highly modified HP.111, which was similar in layout but had a modern six-abreast single-deck fuselage. Avro started with their Vulcan design, keeping its tailless delta wing and mating it with a new fuselage, producing the Avro Atlantic (Avro Type 722). As the name implies, the design was specifically intended to offer trans-Atlantic range. Avro boasted that the delta wing offered good takeoff performance without the need for flaps or slats that conventional wings would require, while also offering a high cruising speed. Various versions were offered with 2+2 to 3+3 seating, with the added oddity that the seats faced to the rear of the aircraft.

The initial submission made by Vickers was designated as the VC5, which was essentially a slightly-stretched Valiant bomber with windows. It retained the Valiant's shoulder-mounted wing, which would have left many rows windowless, and also meant that it had long landing gear that BOAC considered unsuitable. Originally designed in the late 1940s, the VC5 attracted little interest and was soon dropped in favour of a more advanced submission by Vickers. Amongst the differences between the VC5 and the VC7 were a larger 12 ft 6 in (3.81 m) fuselage with six-abreast seating for 131 passengers, the wings having been relocated to a low-mounted position, the addition of slotted flaps, and the overall size of the wing being considerably larger. As envisioned, the VC7 would not only be capable of flying the traditional Empire routes but also the increasingly prestigious North Atlantic market.

=== Selection and refinement ===
In January 1953, Vickers received an order for the production of a flight-capable prototype, later given the serial number XD662, along with a structural test frame. in March 1953, it was revealed that the Vickers design had been selected as the winner of the MoS competition. In June 1954, the Secretary of State for Air William Sidney, 1st Viscount De L'Isle announced that a production order for the military variant, designated as the V-1000, was to be placed for the RAF. Detailed development work on the project started following the issuing of the Specification in October 1952, however it was soon recognised that the V-1000 would be substantially more difficult to develop that any previous transport aircraft that had been operated by the RAF as neither the ministry nor industry were experienced in the development of jet aircraft of this scale before.

As a concept, the aircraft was more complex than the Comet, as well as being physically far larger as an aircraft. The strict and detailed requirements of the specification required extensive testing, such as the heavy use of wind tunnels to cover short-field operations in addition to high-speed cruising flight, while structural and system demands took Vickers into uncharted territories and new entirely new fields. While much of the know-how had been derived from the Valiant and there were elements of the design, such as the engines' internal mounting inside the wings, showed this ancestry, areas such as the structure had dramatic differences, the integrity of the cabin and engine bay conforming to fail-safe principles, unlike the preceding Comet. The finalised design for the V-1000 was enlarged beyond that which the RAF had expected; this was so that commonality could be maximised between the VC7 and V-1000; accordingly, the same airframe was to be used for both the civil and military variants.

A key innovation of the V-1000 was its intended use of the Rolls-Royce Conway, which was the first production bypass engine, offering both increased range and improved fuel economy. Rolls-Royce Limited was already developing the Conway engine, having performed its first running in 1950, and had demonstrated the improved fuel consumption of the engine; by 1951, the Conway was being developed for a thrust output of 13,000 lb; enough to serve as the powerplant for the V-1000. However, as the V-1000 design was enlarged beyond its original dimensions, the development of a more powerful model of the Conway was necessitated, contributing to delays on the overall project.

Construction of the prototype was performed at Vickers' facility at Wisley Airfield, Surrey; flight trials would have also been based there. By November 1956, over £4 million had been spent on the V-1000 project; the first prototype had also reached 80 per cent completion. It had been estimated that the VC7 would have been in operational service as early as 1959, the same year in which the first V-1000s were projected to be delivered to the RAF. If it had entered commercial service as envisioned, it would have been the first turbofan-equipped airliner to serve long-haul routes.

The VC7 proved to be of concern to aircraft manufacturers in the United States, where both Boeing and Douglas were in the process of designing their own jet transports to a very similar requirement from Strategic Air Command. Both companies had responded with designs sized for 2+3 seating (the original 707 design was 2+2), providing more limited passenger capabilities than the VC7. Additionally, the VC7's wing design offered a number of advanced features and increased wing area that greatly reduced take-off run and allowed it to operate from a wider selection of airports, while at the same time offering longer ranges. When the US companies approached airlines with their plans, they found that they were constantly rejected as the VC7 was more interesting. Both companies undertook expensive re-designs of their projects to compete, enlarging the fuselage to match the VC7's 3+3 layout and increasing the overall size and weight of their aircraft. When they were re-introduced to the markets in this larger form, the US firms fared considerably better; after an initial order from Pan American Airways, orders started rolling in from around the world. The better range that the VC7 offered took longer to address, and at one point was solved by incorporating the Conway into those designs.

=== Changing requirements and cancellation ===
In mid-1955, it was acknowledged that the V-1000 would have a higher all-up weight of 248,000lb, instead of the 230,000lb figure that had been originally forecast, negatively impacting the aircraft's performance. By this time, political support for the project was receding; according to Wood, the RAF were having second thoughts about the project. The Air Staff, seeking to reduce expenditure due to pressure from HM Treasury, noted the V-1000 to be one of the most expensive ongoing projects, and thus came to favour its cancellation. By reallocating the budget that had been assigned to the V-1000 to other projects, it would have the effect of avoiding their cancellation instead.

Around the same time, the Air Staff declared that the requirement for the transport to be capable of the same speed and altitude performance as the V-bombers was unnecessary. They also questioned the need to support the V bomber fleet at long distances, given the ever-shrinking state of the British Empire. These changes in attitude may have also been due to government pressure for the RAF to procure the turboprop-powered Bristol Britannia to equip Transport Command. During late 1955, the MoS declared that the demand for strategic airlift was immediate, and chose to purchase several Britannias to fill this role. This selection had coincided with political pressure to bolster employment in Northern Ireland, where much of the production of the Comet 2 was to have been conducted under licence by Short Brothers. The Comet 2's cancellation, along with the aborted Supermarine Swift fighter, had left Short's with a bleak future; an order for Britannias, to be built in the same factory, was seen as providing a neat solution for all concerned.

By November 1955, press rumours regarding the major shifts in RAF transport policy and the fate of the V-1000 were prolific and of a negative tone. On 11 November 1955, the cancellation of the V-1000 order was announced at a press conference held by the MoS. During the conference, a MoS spokesperson spoke in-depth on the V-1000 and its termination, observing that the programme had taken "long than was hoped to overcome some of the programs of meeting the specification", as well as highlighting the role played by the Britannia in substituting for the intended V-1000 fleet. It was also noted that the civil version was also not intended to be developed due to BOAC having no requirement for it.

In addition to the design's military prospects having turned sour, civil opportunities for the type in the form of the VC-7 had also become clouded. According to Wood, Reginald Maudling, the Minister of Supply, believed in the VC7 and of its value to BOAC. In addition, beyond BOAC, other airlines were interested in operating the VC7. Gordon McGregor, the President of Trans-Canada Air Lines, travelled to Britain to lobby in favour of the project's continuation. However, BOAC Chairman Miles Thomas was not as keen on the VC7; the airline had suffered considerable financial hardship due to the crashes of multiple de Havilland Comets, which it had invested heavily in, and BOAC had already committed itself to the improved Comet 4 and had secured permission to procure several Britannias as well.

Upon hearing of the V-1000's termination, Thomas called for an up-to-date specification for the VC7 to be made available, including forecasts of its unit price and delivery dates. After reviewing this information, Thomas announced that he would not purchase the VC7 due to its weight increases impacting its performance; according to Woods, the real reason was BOAC wanting to avoid having to support another British aircraft programme in addition to its existing commitments. Many of BOAC's objections to the VC7 were influenced by the Conway engine, which was still in development at that time. Amongst the detracting claims made where that the enclosed engines in the wing would be unable to accept higher powered fan engines; Woods notes that the successful application of such improvements to the military Victor proves that this was entirely possible. Following the cancellation announcement, Mauldling stated to the press that the decision had been made due to both BOAC and the RAF being unwilling to order the type, leaving him without any alternative.

BOAC declared that they were perfectly happy with the Britannia for their trans-Atlantic routes, and would remain so until an enlarged de Havilland Comet 4 arrived in a few years. In the end, BOAC's decision would quickly be reversed when it became clear that their competitors were going to enter the jet age before them. The VC7 had been cancelled by this point, and a study demonstrated it would be too costly to restart the line. Instead, BOAC ordered the Boeing 707 in October 1956, ironically in a special model to be powered by the Conway. Contrary to BOAC's worries, the Conway proved to have an almost flawless development cycle, and on several occasions outstripped the development of the models it was meant to power.

Also, de Havilland also planned to develop the Comet 5, an enlargement of the Comet 4, including a Wider and longer fuselage with five-abreast seating, a wing with greater sweep and Still buried in the wing root Rolls-Royce Conway engines, Therefore, it bears a striking resemblance to the Vickers V-1000, The fuselage dimensions are basically the same, but the wings are slightly smaller and the fuselage is slightly narrower and engine is positioned closer to the fuselage, and the air intake design is slightly different. . but the project ultimately failed to materialize, and BOAC had already chosen to order 15 Boeing 707s by then.

As had been pointed out at the time, the VC7's performance from limited airfields was considerably better than that of the Boeing 707, which required long runways and extensive ground support. This limited the BOAC 707s to high-volume routes between larger well-equipped airports in Europe and North America. BOAC was also under strong political pressure to offer jet service on a number of limited-capacity "Empire routes" that the Boeing could not service, and turned to Vickers for a solution. The result was the Vickers VC10, with additional power and a smaller fuselage that dramatically improved "hot and high" performance. Although the VC10 was successful in this role, most of the airports for which it had been designed were soon improved sufficiently for the Boeing 707 and Douglas DC-8 to be able to serve them comfortably after all. The VC10 lost its competitive edge, and sold only in limited numbers.

=== Parliamentary debate ===
The cancellation led to a lengthy series of questions in the House that went on for weeks. John Peyton characterised it as "this disappointing and retrograde decision". Deputy Leader of the Labour Party George Brown asked "does not this decision mean that the American companies, the Douglas and the Boeing, will, in effect, be so far ahead of us in the next development of the pure jet that we shall have 10 or 20 years to make up at some stage afterwards?", a prediction that proved astonishingly accurate. Air Commodore Arthur Vere Harvey expressed concerns of the industry in general, while William Robson Brown questioned the wisdom of cancelling at such a late date given that £2.3 million had been invested in the project.

In response, the Minister of Supply, Reginald Maudling, noted that it was extremely unlikely that other airlines would order the VC7, as "everyone concerned accepts that we cannot launch an aircraft of this category into the markets of the world unless we first have a home purchaser who will buy and operate it, which is not so in this case." He declined to offer continued financial support to Vickers for the civilian model for this reason; he also claimed that development had been lagging and weight had increased to offset performance.

These later claims were attacked several weeks later in a lengthy statement by Paul Williams, who pointed out that weight had indeed increased, but Rolls-Royce had addressed this by increasing power to offset this effect. He also noted that the aircraft had a built-in margin of safety due to its larger wing. He described the entire issue as "one of the most disgraceful, most disheartening and most unfortunate decisions that has been taken in relation to the British aircraft industry in recent years."

Woods attributes the cancellation as being the result of a lack of understanding of the air transport industry within the British government of the era. Debate on the issue continued, and the V-1000 continued to come up in debate as late as 1957.

== Design ==
The V-1000 was an all-metal jet-powered aircraft, having adopted a conventional monoplane configuration and broadly resembling a scaled-up version of the de Havilland Comet. The wing differed considerably from the Comet; the outer wing, which housed integral fuel tanks on the VC7 and flexible fuel bags on the V-1000, was swept at 28 degrees, while the leading edge of the inner wing, where the engines and air intake were located, was more highly swept at 38 degrees. The engines, buried within the wings, were placed further outboard than the preceding Comet to reduce cabin noise and avoid the rear fuselage encountering the jet blast. Finally, while the fuselage section looks similar to other "narrow body" airliners, albeit featuring a more rounded ogive-shaped nose similar to the Comet's (a design feature also copied on the Sud Aviation Caravelle), the V-1000 and VC7 were both designed for a six-abreast layout, and thus had a much larger diameter than the Comet.

One of the then-innovative features to be used by the V-1000 was its adoption of the Rolls-Royce Conway engine, the world's first turbofan engine. During takeoff, the Conway's power was to have been boosted by water-methanol injection, of which the aircraft was to carry 550 gallons within the inner wing root. Additionally, uprated versions of the Conway engine were under development, which would have been available for use on the V-1000. The flying controls of the wing consisted of multiple flaps, the inner set of which being single-slotted and the outer pair being double-slotted, two-section independently operated ailerons, and multi-section dive brakes set across various locations of the upper and lower wing surfaces. The tail surfaces were conventional and adopted a similar shape to that used for the wing; the tailplanes had a pronounced dihedral to keep them clear of the jet exhaust. The elevators were split into four separate sections while the rudder was divided into three separately-controlled pieces.

The fuselage consisted of a stringer-skin structure supported by large numbers of light section frames; these frames were attached to Z-section stringers which were in turn rivetted to the skin. A semi-circular spine-like reinforcing beam was to traverse the full length of the fuselage for strength and to stiffen the structure. The entirety of the fuselage was to be pressurised, including its two underfloor cargo holds; the only exceptions being far end of the tail and the landing gear bays. A total of eighteen semi-circular windows, similar to those used on the earlier Vickers Viscount, were to be set into the fuselage along with front and rear entrance doors and a total of six emergency exits. The floor of the main cabin was to be constructed so that it could withstand up to 75lb/sq ft in the center sections while the outer sections were to support up to 150lb/sq ft.

On the military version, a total of five positions were to be provided in the cockpit; the intended crew would have been a pair of pilots, a flight engineer, navigator, and signaller. The main cabin would have been furnished with rear-facing seats in a six-abreast configuration for up to 120 equipped troops. Some of the design features of the VC7 would go on to influence the Vickers VC10. In particular, the wing arrangement with the various high-lift devices, such as the curved Kuchemann-style wingtips adopted, proved useful in the "hot and high" roles the VC10 would later fill. Additionally, the VC10 was powered by the Conway, albeit in a higher-powered version with much greater bypass ratio.

== Specifications (VC7) ==
External image
- Vickers V-1000 three-view drawings (from D.Wood "Project Cancelled")

Data from Vickers Aircraft since 1908

General characteristics

- Capacity: 100 passengers
- Length: 146 ft 0 in (44.50 m)
- Wingspan: 140 ft 0 in (42.67 m)
- Height: 38 ft 6 in (11.73 m)
- Wing area: 3,263 sq ft (303.1 m^{2})
- Aspect ratio: 6.0:1
- Empty weight: 109,100 lb (49,487 kg)
- Max takeoff weight: 231,000 lb (104,780 kg)
- Powerplant: 4 × Rolls-Royce Conway turbofan, 15,000 lbf (67 kN) thrust each

Performance

- Cruise speed: 520 mph (830 km/h, 450 kn)
- Range: 4,100 mi (6,700 km, 3,600 nmi) (still air, 18,900 lb (8,600 kg) payload)
