= Avro Atlantic =

Aircraft model

Avro 722 Atlantic

General information
- Type: Airliner
- National origin: United Kingdom
- Manufacturer: Avro
- Status: Canceled
- Number built: 0

History
- Developed from: Avro Vulcan

The Avro Atlantic (Avro 722) was a proposed civilian airliner derived from the British Avro Vulcan strategic bomber. It was a response to a 1952 UK Ministry of Supply requirement for a new aircraft suitable for both military and civilian long-range roles. Civilian models of the Vickers Valiant and Handley Page Victor V-bombers were also planned for the same contract. The Vickers V-1000 won the contest over the Atlantic, but ultimately none of these designs would be built.

== Development ==
In early June 1953, Sir Roy Dobson C.B.E., then Managing Director of A.V. Roe and Company, revealed that the company was working on a project for a 100-ton airliner based on the Vulcan. The aircraft as initially envisaged, would have carried a flight crew of five (pilot, co-pilot, navigator and two engineering officers) as well as between 76 and 113 passengers in one of three separate configurations (luxury, basic and tourist) at speeds in excess of 600 mph (520 kn; 970 km/h) or Mach 0.9 in a pressurised cabin with an equivalent altitude of 8,000 ft (2,400 m) at 45,000 ft (14,000 m). The chief designer of Avro at the time, after Roy Chadwick's death, was Stuart Davies.

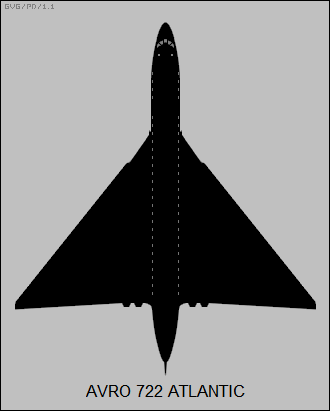
Planform, with the original wing and straight leading edge

The Atlantic would have been powered either by Bristol Olympus or Rolls-Royce Conway engines. Artists illustrations at the time show passengers in a 12 ft 6 in (3.81 m) diameter fuselage, seated in two rows, two-abreast, with a single central aisle, with the seats facing towards the rear of the aircraft for safety reasons. The aircraft was initially depicted in illustrations and 1/24-scale models using the original Vulcan wing planform with a straight-line, swept back leading edge, but a 1955 design revision showed the later Phase 2 'kinked' leading edge to overcome buffet during flight. It was anticipated that the Atlantic would be complete by 1958, and initial discussions were held with British Overseas Airways Corporation (BOAC) regarding the viability of the proposal. Avro is reported to have considered a civilian version of the Vulcan as 'inevitable' in 1954–55, and insisted on an initial order of at least 25 aircraft before it would commence production; these orders were not forthcoming.

== See also ==
- Concorde, a financially controversial aircraft, Anglo-French, with Olympus engines and a delta wing, weighing around 78 tons (empty), carrying a similar number of passengers.
