= 1958 Syerston Avro Vulcan crash =

1958 aviation accident

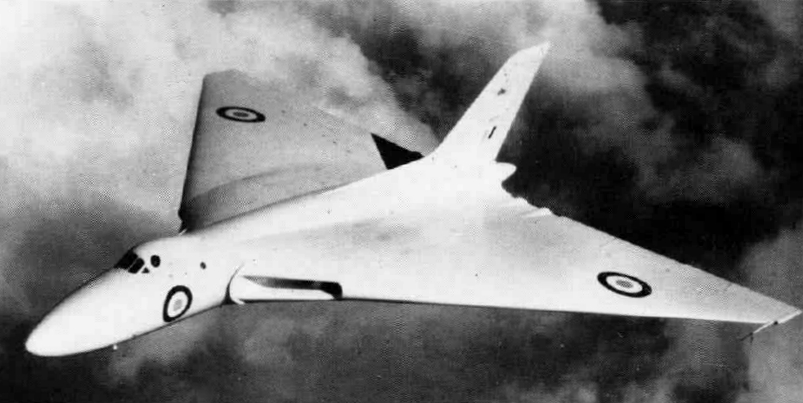
- VX770, the aircraft involved in the accident

Accident
- Date: 20 September 1958
- Summary: Structural failure
- Site: RAF Syerston, Nottinghamshire; 53°1′22.49″N 0°54′45.51″W
- Total fatalities: 7
- Total injuries: 3
- Total survivors: 0

Aircraft
- Aircraft type: Avro Vulcan (prototype)
- Operator: Rolls-Royce Limited
- Registration: VX770
- Flight origin: Hucknall airfield
- Destination: Hucknall airfield
- Occupants: 4
- Crew: 4
- Fatalities: 4
- Survivors: 0

Ground casualties
- Ground fatalities: 3
- Ground injuries: 3

On 20 September 1958 a prototype Avro Vulcan bomber crashed during an air show at RAF Syerston, Nottinghamshire. All four crew on board and three people on the ground were killed.

== Flight ==
VX770 was the first prototype Vulcan. It had first flown with Avon engines, and had later been fitted with Sapphires. More recently, it had been fitted with Rolls-Royce Conway engines; on the day of the accident it was flying from the Rolls-Royce airfield at Hucknall to test the Conways. The four crew on board included a flight test engineer from Avro. During the course of the test-flight VX770 diverted to RAF Syerston to participate in the Battle of Britain day air show.

== Accident ==
The Vulcan flew along runway 07 then started a rolling climb to starboard. During this manoeuvre the starboard wing disintegrated, resulting in a collapse of the main spar and wing structure. The Vulcan went into a dive with the starboard wing on fire and struck the ground. Three occupants of a controllers' caravan were killed by debris and all four of the Vulcan crew were killed. Three servicemen who were in an ambulance were injured by debris .

== Cause ==
The official primary cause for the accident was a gross structural failure of the aircraft's main spar, which was confirmed by amateur footage, photographs and eyewitness accounts. The reason for the failure was not determined by the Board of Inquiry (BoI), but it was suggested by an accident investigator called in by Rolls-Royce that the main cause was that the pilot, upon performing the planned aerobatic display, exceeded the prototype's briefed speed and turning rate limits. The accident investigator submitted a statement to the BoI, but did not give evidence under oath. The BoI was apparently not informed that the aircraft manufacturer considered the basis for the statement to be invalid. The Technical Officer of the Board of Inquiry identified a suspected fatigue failure of the inboard arm of the front bottom wing attachment main forging, and suggested vibration from the high airflow volumes required by the RR Conway 11 engines as a possible cause.

The Royal Aircraft Establishment carried out a structural analysis of the wreckage and produced a report on 21 April 1960, but no copy has been found in the public record. Avro's then chief test pilot, Tony Blackman, has argued that the aircraft had probably suffered undetected damage during earlier flights during which the aircraft had reportedly been 'unofficially' rolled and looped by Rolls-Royce test pilot(s), and that the maintenance crew did not carry out an inspection for potential issues with stress damage to the aircraft's leading edges and nose ribs known to the manufacturer which had been observed in another prototype he had flown earlier. Avro reportedly inspected for damage using an exceptionally small technician after each aerobatic flight, Rolls may not have been aware of this practice.

== Bibliography ==
- Blackman, Tony (2009). Vulcan Test Pilot: My Experiences in the Cockpit of a Cold War Icon. Casemate Publishers. ISBN 9781906502300.
- Vulcan Mk 1, VX770: RAF Syerston, Notts, 20 Sept. 1958 Official incident report at The National Archives
