= Rolls-Royce Conway =

1950s British turbofan aircraft engine family

Conway
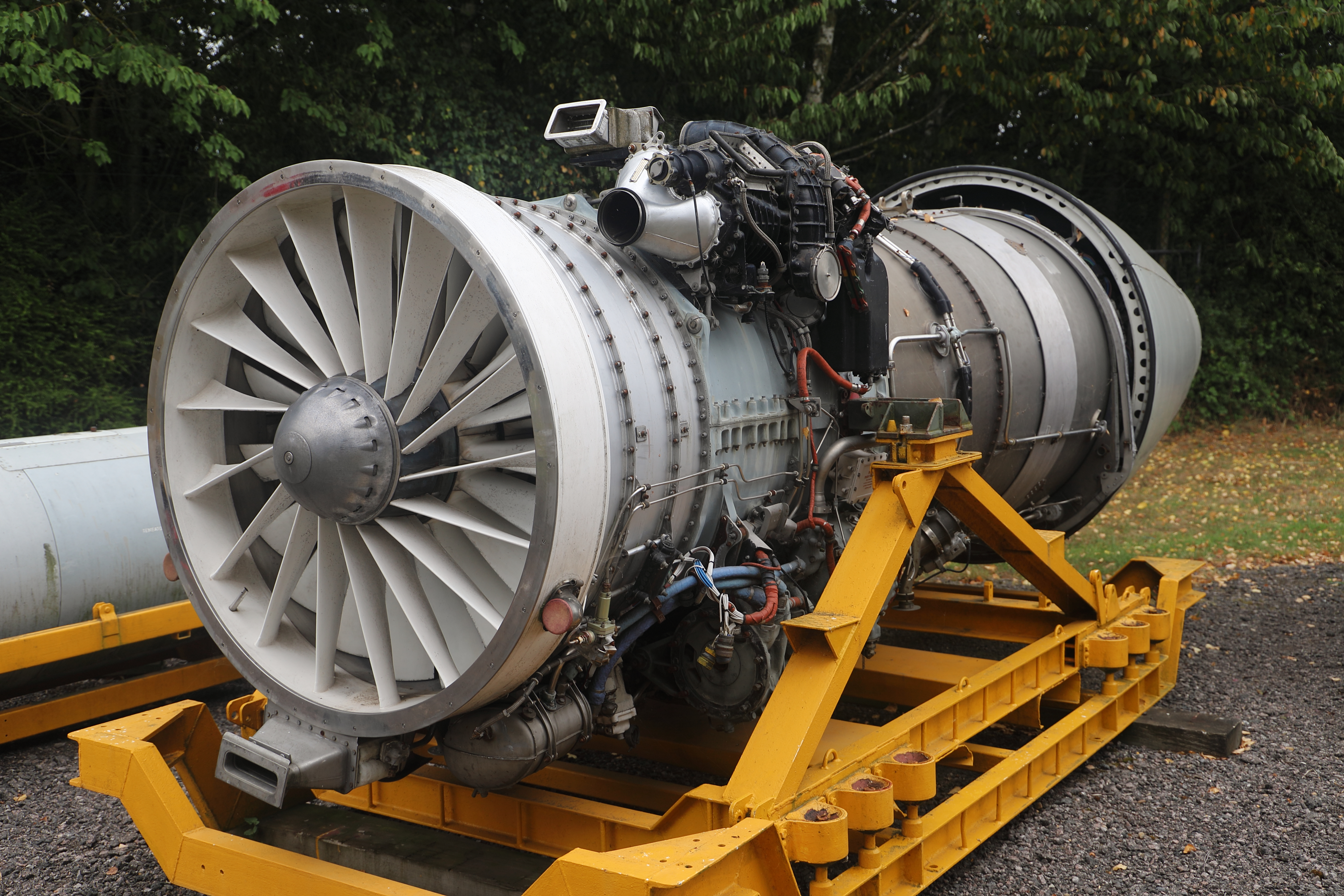
- Rolls-Royce Conway on display at the East Midlands Aeropark
- Type: Bypass turbojet
- Manufacturer: Rolls-Royce Limited
- Major applications: Boeing 707; Douglas DC-8; Handley Page Victor; Vickers VC10
- Developed into: Rolls-Royce Spey

The Rolls-Royce RB.80 Conway was the first bypass turbojet engine to enter service. Development started at Rolls-Royce in the 1940s, but the design was used only briefly, in the late 1950s and early 1960s, before true turbofan designs replaced it. The Conway engine was used on versions of the Handley Page Victor, Vickers VC10, Boeing 707-420 and Douglas DC-8-40.

The name "Conway" is the English spelling of the River Conwy, in Wales, in keeping with Rolls' use of river names for gas turbine engines.

== Development ==
=== Background ===
Alan Arnold Griffith had proposed a number of different bypass or turbofan engine designs as early as the 1930s while he and Hayne Constant were trying to get their axial-flow jet engines working at the Royal Aircraft Establishment. However, simpler turbojet designs were prioritized during World War II for their use in military applications. Priorities changed dramatically at the end of the war and in 1946 Rolls-Royce agreed that existing engines like the Rolls-Royce Avon were advanced enough to enable a start to work on more advanced concepts like bypass, in which a portion of high pressure compressor air is diverted outside the combustion and turbine sections via duct.

Griffith, who by then had become Chief Engineer at Rolls-Royce, suggested building a purely experimental bypass design using parts of the Avon and another experimental jet engine, the AJ.25 Tweed. In April 1947, a 5,000-pound-force (22,000 N) design was proposed, but over the next few months it was modified to evolve into a larger 9,250-pound-force (41,100 N) design in response to a need for a new engine to power the Mk.2 low-level version of the Vickers Valiant bomber. The go-ahead to start construction of this larger design was given in October, under the name RB.80.

=== Early models ===
During development, it was decided to further improve the basic design by adding another feature, a "two spool" compressor arrangement. Earlier engines generally consisted of a series of compressor stages connected via a shaft to one or more turbine stages, with the burners between them arranged around the shaft. Although this arrangement is mechanically simple, it has the disadvantage of lowering the efficiency of the compressor. Compressor stages run at their maximum efficiency when spinning at a specific speed for any given input air pressure - in a perfect compressor, each stage would run at a separate speed. The multi-spool design, first used on the Bristol Olympus turbojet, is a compromise, the compressor being separated into "spools" designed to operate closer to most efficient speed, driven by separate turbines via concentric shafts. Two- and three-spool designs are common; beyond that the mechanical complexity is too great.

The new version had a four-stage low-pressure compressor driven by a two-stage turbine and an eight stage high-pressure compressor driven by another two-stage turbine. Now known by the Ministry of Supply designation as the RCo.2, design work was completed in January 1950 and the first example ran for the first time in July 1952 at 10,000 pounds-force (44,000 N) thrust. By this time, the low-level Valiant Pathfinder had been abandoned and so the first example was also destined to be the last. Nevertheless, it proved the basic concept sound and "ran perfectly for the whole of its 133 hours life."

The work on the RCo.2 was soon put to good use. In October 1952, the Royal Air Force awarded a contract for the Vickers V-1000, a large jet-powered strategic transport that was intended to allow the V bomber force to be supported in the field through air supply only. Vickers also planned on developing a passenger version of the same basic design as the VC-7. The V-1000 design looked like an enlarged de Havilland Comet (A successor model of this machine was also planned to use Rolls-Royce Conway, but this model ultimately did not come to fruition.) but from the Valiant it took the wing layout and added a compound sweep (a passing vogue in UK design). It also featured the Comet's wing-embedded engines, demanding an engine with a small cross-section, which limited the amount of bypass the engine could use. It nevertheless required higher power to support a 230,000 pounds (100,000 kg) gross weight, so Rolls responded with the larger RCo.5.

The new engine was similar to the RCo.2 in most ways, differing in details. The low-pressure compressor now had six stages and the high-pressure nine, driven by two and one stage turbines respectively. The first RCo.5 ran in July 1953 and passed an official type rating in August 1955 at 13,000 pounds-force (58,000 N). Construction of the prototype V-1000 was well underway at Vickers Armstrong's Wisley works in the summer of 1955 when the entire project was cancelled. Having second thoughts about the concept of basing the V-bombers away from the UK, the need for the V-1000 became questionable and it became an easy decision to drop the project.

=== Production versions ===
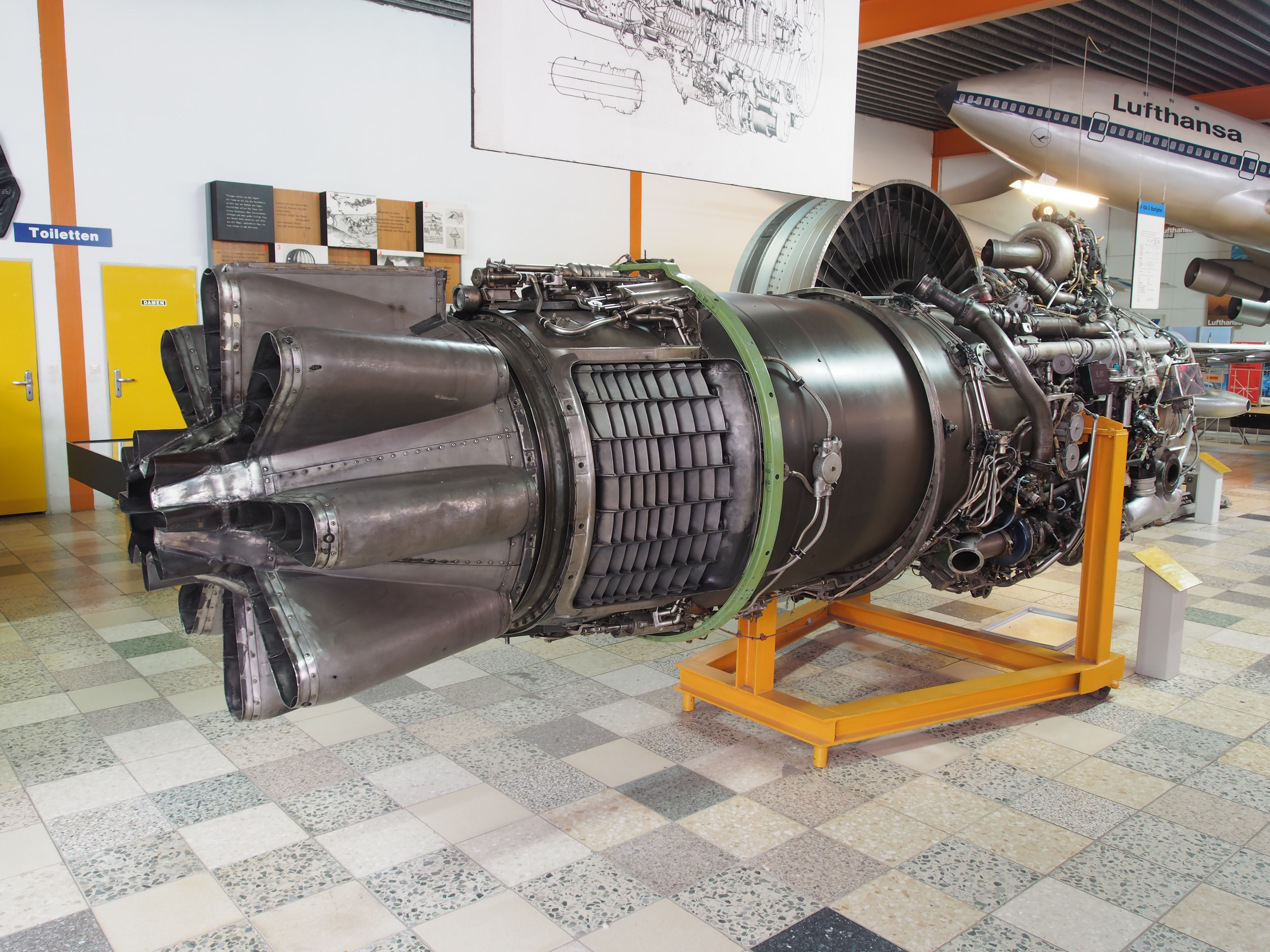
A Rolls-Royce Conway from a Boeing 707, with hush kit equipped.

The Conway was saved once again when it was selected to power the Handley Page Victor B.2 variant, replacing the Armstrong Siddeley Sapphire used by earlier models. For this role, Rolls-Royce designed an even larger model, the RCo.8 of 14,500 pounds-force (64,000 N), which ran for the first time in January 1956. However the RCo.8 was skipped over after receiving a request from Trans-Canada Airlines (TCA) to explore a Conway-powered Boeing 707 or Douglas DC-8, having interested both companies in the idea. Rolls-Royce responded by designing an even larger model of the Conway, the 16,500 pounds-force (73,000 N) RCo.10 and offering the similar military-rated RCo.11 for the Victor. The new engine differed from the RCo.8 in having a new "zeroth stage" at the front of the low-pressure compressor, further increasing cold airflow around the engine. The RCo.10 first flew in the modified prototype Avro Vulcan VX770 on 9 August 1957 only for the aircraft to be lost in a crash the following year. The RCo.11 was flown in the Victor on 20 February 1959.

Boeing calculated that the Conway with a bypass of only 30% would increase the proposed 707-420's range by 8% above the otherwise identical 707-320 powered by Pratt & Whitney JT4A (J75) turbojets. That estimate proved optimistic; the actual range improvement was a maximum of 2%. In May 1956, TCA ordered Conway-powered DC-8-40s, followed by additional orders from Alitalia and Canadian Pacific Air Lines, while the Conway-powered 707-420 was ordered by BOAC, Lufthansa, Varig, El Al and Air India. RCo.10's development was so smooth that after delivering a small number for testing, production deliveries switched to the 17,500-pound-force (78,000 N) RCo.12, which was designed, built and tested before the airframes finished testing. Boeing's 707-420 featured a distinctive, scalloped exhaust nozzle (pictured above) incorporating noise suppression and mechanical and aerodynamic thrust reversal up to 50%, which was developed and supplied by Rolls-Royce. Douglas developed the DC-8's reverser-suppressor nozzle to work in conjunction with a variable ejector, which provided necessary, additional noise suppression.

Although successful in this role, only 37 707s and 32 DC-8s were fitted with the Conway, due largely to delivery of the Pratt & Whitney JT3D: this was the first US-built bypass engine and had a considerably higher bypass ratio than the Conway. Nevertheless, the Conway was successful on those aircraft, and was the first commercial aero engine to be awarded an operational period of up to 10,000 hours between major overhauls. Due to the Conway, B707-420 take-offs were the loudest by jetliners on airports and over communities until Concorde entered service. However, the Conway was revolutionary, being the first bypass turbojet, and the first commercial engine, equipped with internally air-cooled turbine blades, which partially accounted for its high efficiency and an extremely high exhaust temperature of 1,247 °F (675 °C).

=== Final versions ===
Final development of the Conway first involved the RCo.42, designed specifically for the Vickers VC10. As the need for wing-embedded engines was long abandoned by this point, Rolls-Royce dramatically increased the zero-stage diameter to increase the bypass from about 30% to 60%. Other major revisions were incorporated, primarily in the low-pressure compressor. First run was in March 1961. Takeoff rating was 20,370 pounds-force (90,600 N). For the Super VC10, the last model was the RCo.43, rated at 21,800 pounds-force (97,000 N).

== Design ==
The RCo.12 Conway was an axial-flow turbofan with a low bypass of about 30% or bypass ratio of 0.3:1. It had a seven-stage low-pressure compressor, the first six stages made of aluminium and the last of titanium. Behind this was the nine-stage high-pressure compressor, the first seven stages of titanium and the last two of steel. The bypass housing duct was also made of titanium. The bypass duct started after the seventh stage. The combustion area consisted of ten cannular flame cans. The high-pressure compressor was driven by a single-stage turbine using hollow air-cooled blades, which was followed by the two-stage turbine powering the low-pressure compressor. Accessories were arranged around the front of the engine to minimise overall diameter.

The RCo.12 produced 17,500 pounds-force (78,000 N) for takeoff, weighed 4,544 pounds (2,061 kg) dry and had a specific fuel consumption of 0.725 at takeoff and 0.874 for typical cruise.

In 1968, Hyfil carbon-fibre fan blades were installed on Conways of VC10s operated by BOAC.

=== Patent dispute ===
In November, 1966, the inlet to the Conway engine, together with those for commercial Avon and Spey installations, was the subject of a patent infringement claim against Rolls-Royce by Rateau, a French manufacturer of steam turbines and automobile superchargers. Société pour l’exploitation des appareils Rateau of La Courneuve, who alleged the inlets infringed two of their expired 1939 patents. The patent stated that the intake, by its diffusing internal shape, determines the speed of the air entering the engine compressor. Since the Conway in the Boeing 707, and the other Rolls-Royce engines, had diffusing intakes, Rateau expected to be compensated for every engine made, as well as stopping all future production. Although Rateau's claim was only against Rolls-Royce, its understanding of the purpose of an intake applied to any jet engine installation. Witnesses for Rolls-Royce, including Frank Whittle, convinced the judge that an intake did not produce the effect claimed and that the claim was "speculative" because, by 1939, no axial-flow aircraft jet engine had been built and that earlier patents from Frank Whittle and others had already considered the design of the intakes.

== Variants ==
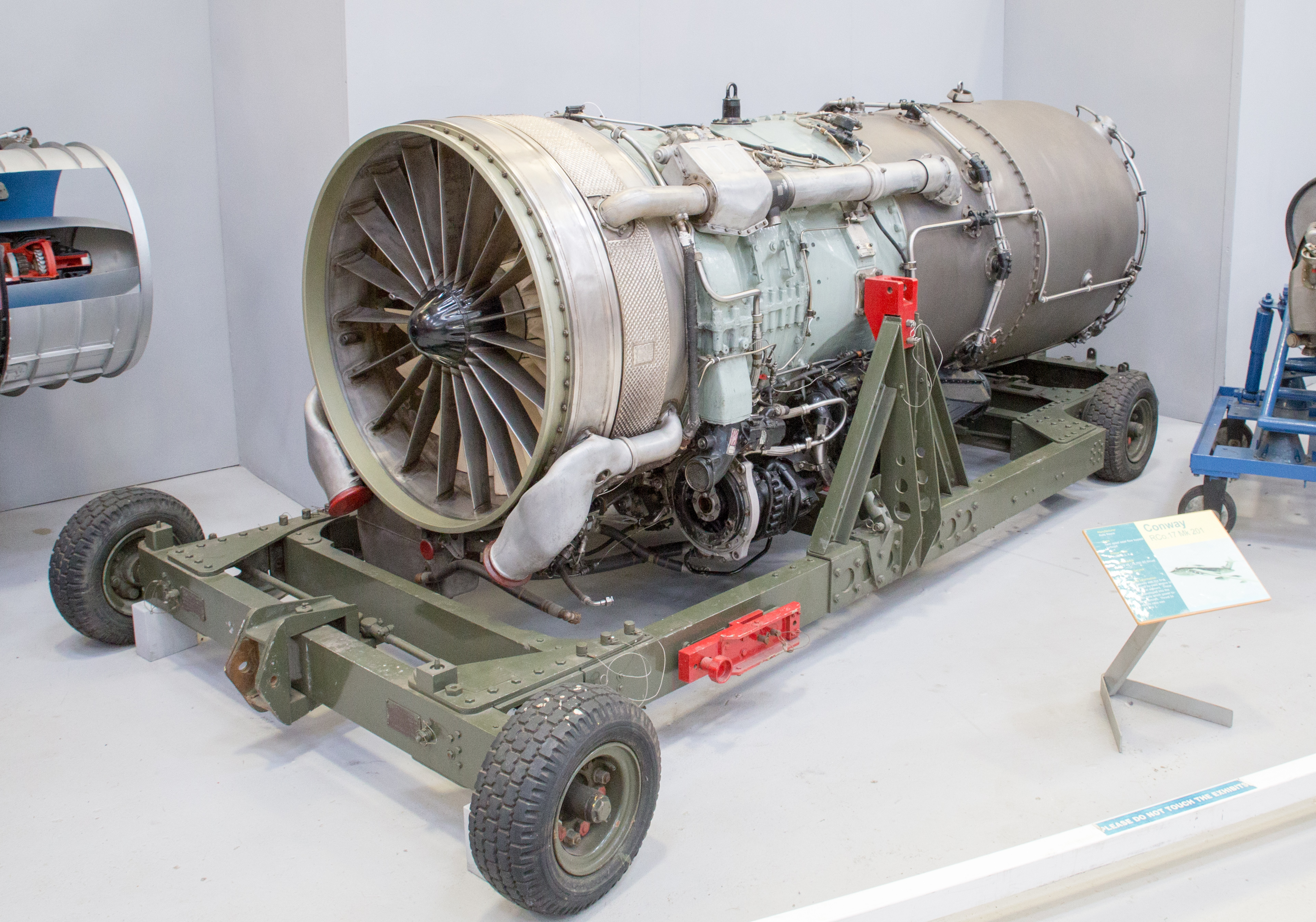
Rolls-Royce Conway RCo.17 (Mk.201) on display at Royal Air Force Museum Midlands

RCo.2
RCo.3
RCo.5
RCo.7
RCo.8
RCo.10
RCo.11
RCo.12
RCo.14
RCo.15
RCo.17
RCo.42
RCo.42/1
RCo.43
Conway 103
(RCo.11)
Conway 505
(RCo.10)
Conway 507
(RCo.10)

== Applications ==
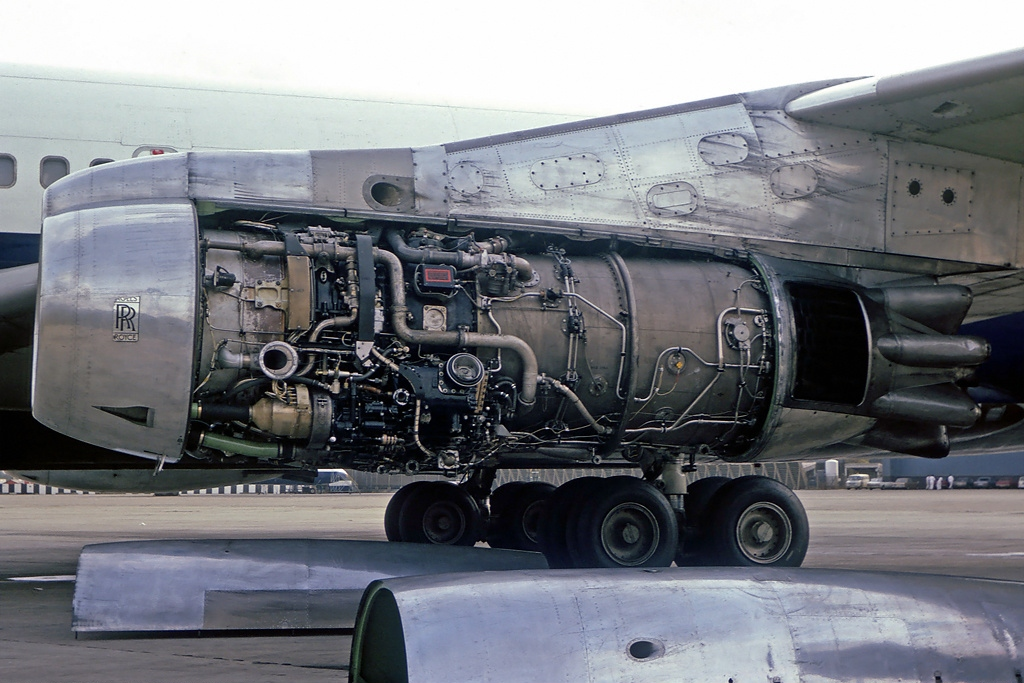
Rolls-Royce Conway engine on a British Airtours Boeing 707-436

- Boeing 707-420
- Douglas DC-8-40
- Handley Page Victor
- Vickers VC10

== Engines on display ==
- A Rolls-Royce Conway from a VC.10 is displayed at the South Yorkshire Aircraft Museum, Doncaster.
- A Rolls-Royce Conway Mk.201 is on display at the Royal Air Force Museum Midlands.
- Farnborough Air Sciences Trust museum, Farnborough, UK.
- A sectioned Conway is displayed as part of a stack of jet engines at the National Museum of Flight at East Fortune in Scotland.
- A sectioned Conway is on display at the Discovery Museum, Newcastle upon Tyne, UK.

== Specifications (Conway RCo.12) ==
Data from Jane's All The World's Aircraft 1969-70

==== General characteristics ====
- Type: Bypass turbojet
- Length: 132.4 in (3,360 mm)
- Diameter: 42 in (1,100 mm)
- Dry weight: 4,544 lb (2,061 kg)

==== Components ====
- Compressor: dual axial flow; 7-stage LP, 9-stage HP
- Combustors: cannular steel with 10 Nimonic flames tubes
- Turbine: axial flow; 1-stage HP (Nimonic air-cooled blades), 2-stage LP
- Oil system: Wet sump type

==== Performance ====
- Maximum thrust: 17,500 lb (77.8 kN) at 9,980 rpm (100%)
- Overall pressure ratio: 14.1:1
- Bypass ratio: 0.30:1
- Air mass flow: 280 lb (127 kg) per sec
- Specific fuel consumption: 0.725 at sea level rating; typical cruise sfc=0.874
- Thrust-to-weight ratio: 3.85

== See also ==
Related development

- Rolls-Royce Spey

Comparable engines

- Kuznetsov NK-8
- Pratt & Whitney JT3D
- Rolls-Royce Spey, a smaller turbofan designed after the Conway

Related lists

- List of aircraft engines
