= George Edwards (aviation) =

British aircraft designer and industrialist

- Born: 9 July 1908; Highams Park, London, England
- Died: 2 March 2003 (aged 94); Guildford, Surrey, England
- Education: Walthamstow Technical Institute Engineering and Trade School; University of London
- Known for: BAC One-Eleven, Concorde
- Scientific career
- Fields: Aircraft Designer
- Workplaces: Vickers-Armstrongs, British Aircraft Corporation

Sir George Robert Freeman Edwards OM CBE FREng FRS DL (9 July 1908 – 2 March 2003), was a British aircraft designer and industrialist.

== Early life ==
George Edwards was born on 9 July 1908 at Highams Park, on the north side of London, England.

He attended Walthamstow Technical Institute Engineering and Trade School, after which he took an engineering course at the University of London and in 1926 acquired a Batchelor of Science (BSc) degree.

The Walthamstow Technical Institute in 1970 became part of North East London Polytechnic (which later became part of the University of East London)

== Career ==
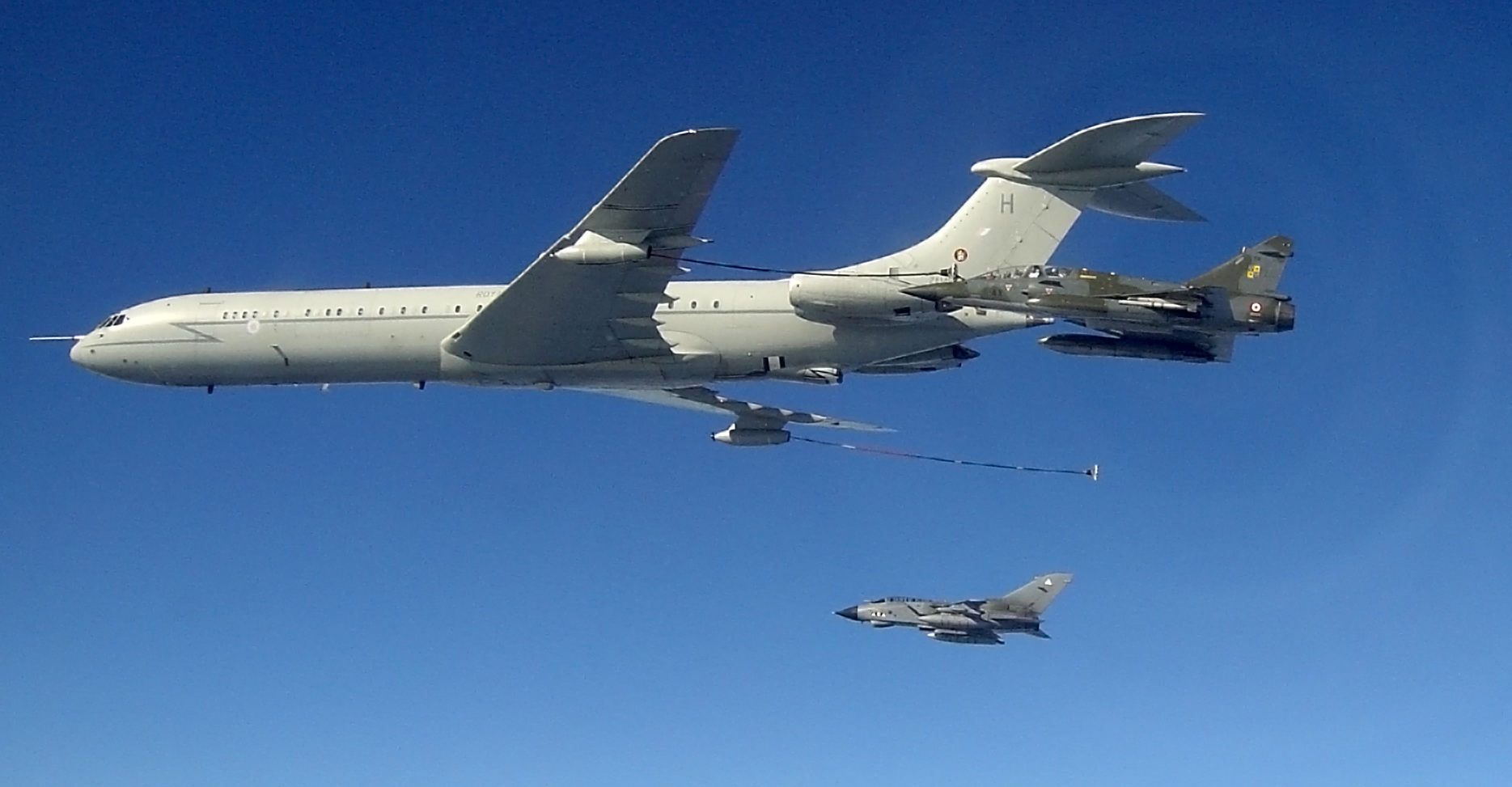
Vickers VC-10 tanker in September 2005

=== Vickers ===
Beginning as a design draughtsman in 1935, he was promoted in 1940 to Experimental Department Manager and in 1945 he became the Chief Designer of the Vickers-Armstrongs team that produced the Viking airliner, Valetta military transport, Varsity trainer, Viscount airliners and Valiant strategic bomber. He later became managing director of the company, during which time the Vanguard, VC10 and (post-merger) BAC TSR-2 strike bomber were developed. He was knighted in 1957. He was President of the Royal Aeronautical Society in 1957–58.

=== BAC ===
When Vickers was merged into the newly created British Aircraft Corporation, he became executive director. During this period, he initiated the BAC One-Eleven (initially a Hunting Aircraft design). BAC was also a partner in the international projects for Concorde (for which he led the British team), Anglo-French SEPECAT Jaguar and the Panavia Tornado.

He was awarded the Daniel Guggenheim Medal in 1959. He won the Air League Founders Medal in 1969. He was made a member of the Order of Merit in 1971, and was awarded the Royal Medal in 1974 for his distinguished contributions in the applied sciences. He retired from BAC, as chairman, in 1975. In 1989 he was invested in the International Aerospace Hall of Fame.

== Personal life ==
In October 1935 he married Marjorie Annie (Dinah) Thurgood (1908–1994), a clerk, also from Highams Park. They had a close and mutually supportive marriage and had one daughter, Angela.

His interests included painting and cricket. He was president of Surrey County Cricket Club in 1979. He died in Guildford in 2003 and his memorial service was held in Guildford Cathedral. He is buried at St Martha-on-the-Hill.

Professional and academic associations
| Preceded by E. T. Jones | President of the Royal Aeronautical Society; 1957–1958 | Succeeded by Arnold Alexander Hall |
Business positions
| Preceded by New company | Chairman of British Aircraft Corporation; 1963–1975 | Succeeded by |
| Preceded by Rex Pierson | Chief Designer of Vickers; 1946–1960 | Succeeded by Company defunct |
