= Strathallan School =

School in Forgandenny, Perth and Kinross, Scotland

Coordinates: 56°20′56″N 3°28′13″W

Location
- Forgandenny; Perth and Kinross, PH2 9EG; Scotland

Information
- Type: Public school Private boarding and day school
- Motto: Labor omnia vincit (Work conquers all)
- Established: 1913; 113 years ago
- Founder: Harry Riley
- Headmaster: Mark Lauder
- Staff: 91
- Gender: Co-educational
- Age: 5 to 18
- Enrolment: 580
- Campus: Rural; 150 acres (0.61 km^{2})
- Houses: Riley; Freeland; Nicol; Ruthven; Simpson; Thornbank; Woodlands; Glenbrae
- Colours: Royal blue, navy & gold
- Publication: The Strathallian; Blue & Gold
- Alumni: Strathallians
- Website: www.strathallan.co.uk

Strathallan School is a private boarding and day school in Scotland for boys and girls aged 5–18. The school has a 153-acre (62-hectare) campus at Forgandenny, a few miles south of Perth.

== School roll ==
The school has 73 full-time staff, and 18 part-time staff. It has pupils as follows:

	Boarders	Day pupils	Total
Boys	166	128	294
Girls	148	99	247
Total	314	227	541

== History ==
Strathallan School is a Scottish private co-educational boarding and day school for pupils aged 8–18. Strathallan was founded by Harry Riley in 1913. In 1920 the school moved to its present-day campus in Forgandenny which spans 153 acres of rural Perthshire.

=== Headmasters ===
- Harry Riley FRSE (1913–1942)
- W. E. Ward (1942–1948)
- A. J. Shaw (Interim, 1948–1949)
- A. N. Hamilton (1949–1950)
- Wilfred Hoare (1951–1970)
- Duncan McCallum (1970–1975)
- David Pighills (1975–1993)
- Angus McPhail (1993–2000)
- Bruce Thompson (2000–2017)
- Mark Lauder (2017–present)

== Academics ==
The curriculum is largely based on the English system, with some elements of the Scottish system. Most pupils study for GCSEs, although some study for Standard Grades in one or two subjects. Then, in their last two years, in sixth form, they study for either A-levels or Scottish Highers. 82% of this year's A level entries were graded A*/Bgrades.

=== Sixth form subjects ===
The school offers the following courses to Lower and Upper Sixth Form students:

A-Level	Higher
Art	Art (A-Level)
Biology	Biology
Business Studies	Business Management
Chemistry	Chemistry
Classical Civilisation	–
Computing	Computing
Design & Technology	Craft & Design
Economics	Economics (subject to demand)
English	English
French	French
Geography	Geography
German	German
History	History
Latin	–
Music	Music (MIDI Sequencing)
Further Maths	Physical Education
Maths	Maths
Philosophy (One year higher course)	Philosophy (Two year higher course)
Physics	Physics
Psychology	Psychology
Spanish	Spanish
Theatre Studies	Drama
Extended Project Qualification	Religious Education

== Extracurricular activities ==
Pupils also participate in sport, drama, music, and other extracurricular activities. The school offers sports including rugby, cricket, field hockey, netball, football, athletics, squash, swimming, tennis, golf, badminton and skiing. Music also plays a vital role in the school, with many pupils playing in orchestras or ensembles such as a jazz band, pipe band or various choirs. A scholarship scheme is also available to talented pupils in a range of categories, including Academic, Art, Design Technology/Arkwright Scholarship, Music, Performing Arts, Piping, and Sports. The school organises regular drama productions and a significant number of pupils achieve London Academy of Music and Dramatic Art (LAMDA) awards. Pupils can also gain degrees from the London College of Music and Trinity College of Music through the school. Other activities include Combined Cadet Force (CCF) and the Duke of Edinburgh's Award Scheme. Strathallan is also notable as the only school in Scotland with a Royal Marine cadet Troop.

== Notable alumni ==
- Jamie Cachia (born 1987), Scotland hockey international with >50 caps
- Mike Allingham (born 1965), Scotland cricket international.
- David Anderson (born 1937), former vice-chairman of the London Commodity Exchange.
- Sir George Baker (1910–1984), High Court judge.
- Chris Baur (1942–2026), editor of The Scotsman (1985–1988).
- William Hugh Beeton (1903–1976), Chief Commissioner of Ashanti (1950–1954); vice-president of the Royal African Society.
- Professor Alan Brash (born 1949), Professor of Pharmacology at Vanderbilt University.
- JJ Chalmers (born 1986), Scottish television presenter and Invictus Games medallist.
- John Cochrane (1930–2006), Concorde test pilot.
- Nicki Cochrane (born 1993), Scottish international hockey player.
- Brigadier David Cranston (born 1945), British Army officer and businessman.
- Hamish Dawson (1927–2007), Scotland rugby union international.
- Dominik Diamond — Television Presenter
- Professor Alasdair Drysdale (born 1950), Professor Emeritus of Geography at the University of New Hampshire.
- Ronald Duncan (born 1962), British Olympic alpine skier.
- Tessa Dunlop (born 1974/5), television presenter and historian
- Matt Fagerson (born 16 July 1998 in Perth, Scotland), Scotland international rugby union player.
- Zander Fagerson (born 19 January 1996), Scottish international rugby union player.
- John Forrest (1917–1942), Scotland rugby union international.
- Bill Fraser (1908–1987), Laurence Olivier Award winning actor.
- Jim Gellatly (born 1968), radio presenter.
- Sir Ian Grant (1943–2022), former chairman of the Crown Estate and Scottish Tourist Board.
- John Grant (1949–2020), writer and editor.
- Professor Peter Grant (born 1944), Regius Professor of Engineering at the University of Edinburgh; awarded 82nd Faraday Medal.
- John Malcolm Gray (1934–2009), chairman of HSBC (1993–96).
- Charlie Guest (born 30 December 1993), Scottish World Cup alpine ski racer.
- Thomas Hart (1908–2001), Financial Secretary to Singapore; Scotland cricket and rugby union international.
- Chris Hartley (born 1982), Queensland Bulls and Australia A cricketer.
- Ashley Harvey-Walker (1944–1997), Warwickshire and Derbyshire county cricketer.
- Donny Hay (1959–2026), Scotland hockey international.
- Richard Henderson (born 1947), president of the Law Society of Scotland (2007–09).
- George Horne (born 12 May 1995), Scotland international rugby union player.
- Air Chief Marshal Sir Angus Houston (born 1947), Royal Australian Air Force; former Chief of the Defence Force (2005–2011).
- 'Lord' Tim Hudson (1940–2019), DJ, voice actor and talent agent.
- Sir William Jardine, 13th Baronet (born 1984), 24th Chief of Clan Jardine.
- Robert Smith Johnston, Lord Kincraig (1918–2004), High Court Judge.
- Ian Jones (born 1941), co-founder and former chairman of Quayle Munro merchant bank.
- Archibald Angus Charles Kennedy, 8th Marquess of Ailsa, 19th Earl of Cassilis, 21st Lord Kennedy, 8th Baron Ailsa (1957–2015), known as Charles Cassilis when a pupil
- Major General Lamont Kirkland (born 1958), British Army officer; former Commander 4th Infantry Division.
- Gilmour Leburn (1913–1963), MP Conservative, Kinross and West Perthshire (1955–1963); Under-Secretary of State for Scotland (1959–1963).
- Nicholas Lydon (born 1957), awarded the Lasker Clinical Award and Japan Prize for the development of Gleevec.
- Murray McCallum (born 16 March 1996), Scottish international rugby union player.
- Barbie MacLaurin (born 1963), BAFTA nominated television producer and director.
- Ian MacNaughton (1925–2002), BAFTA winning television and film director, notably of Monty Python's Flying Circus.
- Professor Morris McInnes (1940–2020), Professor Emeritus of Accounting at the Sawyer Business School, Suffolk University, Boston, USA.
- Professor Hugh Miller (1939–2019), Professor Emeritus of Forestry at the University of Aberdeen; IUFRO Scientific Award.
- Doug Mitchell (born 1952), Academy Award nominated film producer for Babe.
- David Mitton (1939–2008), BAFTA nominated director and screenwriter, including Thomas the Tank Engine and Friends.
- Colin Montgomerie (born 1963), Scottish professional golfer; World golf hall of fame.
- Michael Moore (born 1965), MP Liberal Democrat, Berwickshire, Roxburgh and Selkirk (2005–2015); Secretary of State for Scotland (2010–2013).
- Peter Niven (born 1964), 1,000 race-winning National Hunt jockey and racehorse trainer.
- Robert Reid (born 1966), winner of the 2001 World Rally Driving Championship.
- Jamie Ritchie (born 16 August 1996) Scotland international rugby union player.
- Air Commodore John Buchan Ross (1912–2009), Royal Air Force officer.
- Ninian Sanderson (1925–1985), winner of the 1956 24 Hours of Le Mans.
- Duncan Scott (swimmer) (born 6 May 1997) is a British swimmer representing Great Britain at the FINA World Aquatics Championships and the Olympic Games, and Scotland at the Commonwealth Games.
- Professor Sir John Shaw (1932–2021), Johnstone Smith Professor of Accountancy at the University of Glasgow; Governor Bank of Scotland (1999–2001).
- Professor John Sinclair (1935–2009), Emeritus Professor of Conveyancing at the University of Strathclyde.
- Iain Steel (born 1971), Malaysian professional golfer.
- Struan Stevenson (born 1948), Conservative MEP.
- Gareth Trayner (born 1980), British Olympic alpine skier.
- Lawrence Urquhart (1935–2025), former chairman of Castrol, Scottish Widows and BAA
- Gavin Vernon (1926–2004), renowned for the Removal of the Stone of Scone in 1950.
- Eric McKellar Watt (1920–2001), founder of the 'McKellar Watt' meat pie company.
- Professor Nairn Wilson (born 1950), former Dean and Head of King's College London Dental Institute; numerous awards for dentistry.
- Michael Yellowlees (born 1960), Scotland field hockey international.

== Controversies ==
In 2005, Strathallan was one of 50 independent schools in Britain found guilty of running a price-fixing cartel.

In 1998 a female teacher sued the school for discrimination alleging she had been sacked because she was unable to coach rugby at the mostly male school.

In 1995 two former pupils were found guilty and fined for drug possession after police had been called to the school in 1993 and found them in possession of cannabis resin. Charges against the pair relating to being involved in the supply of drugs at the school were dropped.
