= Yellowlees =

Yellowlees is a surname. Notable people with the surname include:

- Henry Yellowlees (1919–2006), English medical officer
- J. Yellowlees Douglas (born 1962), American academic
- Lesley Yellowlees (born 1953), British chemist
- Michael Yellowlees (born 1960), Scottish field hockey player
- Norm Yellowlees (1912–1991), Canadian ice hockey player
- Peter Yellowlees (born 1954), British psychiatrist and author
- William Yellowlees (1796–1855), Scottish painter
