= Ian Quayle Jones =

Scottish businessman (born 1941)

- Born: 1941 (age 84–85)
- Education: Strathallan School, Perthshire, Scotland; University of Edinburgh
- Occupation: businessman
- Title: Quayle Munro merchant bank (co-founder, former chairman & CEO)

Ian Quayle Jones (born 1941) is the co-founder and former chairman and chief executive of Quayle Munro merchant bank.

== Education ==
Ian Quayle Jones was educated at Strathallan School in Perthshire, Scotland and the University of Edinburgh, graduating with a degree in law.

== Career ==
Jones qualified as a solicitor and joined Cowans Stewart where he became a partner. In 1972 he moved to Ivory & Syme as a fund manager. Within a year he moved to the British Linen Bank, the merchant banking arm of the Bank of Scotland. Following several promotions, he was appointed director with responsibility for the investment department. Jones also managed the bank's investment company, Melville Street Investments (Edinburgh), which specialised in providing finance for unlisted companies. In 1981 Jones organised Scotland's first privatisation, Gleneagles Hotel, which was part of British Transport Hotels. In 1983, he formed his own company.

=== Quayle Munro ===
Ian Jones and Michael Munro established Quayle Munro in 1983 to provide professional financial services to companies in Scotland and the North of England. Initially, Jones and Munro were executive directors and Sir Alan Smith was chairman.

Over time the firm developed three main areas of operation: corporate finance work for smaller plcs and large privately owned companies, including advice on capital-raising, mergers and acquisitions; an investment portfolio in listed and unlisted United Kingdom (UK) companies; and advising/funding private finance initiative (PFI) deals in Scotland.

In the 1980s, Jones oversaw several large deals including Dawson International's £650 million bid for Coats PLC and the listing of Shanks Group on the London Stock Exchange. Quayle Munro also advised the Scottish Office on the privatisation of ScotRail and the Scottish Bus Group, the disposal of the Scottish Development Agency's investment portfolio, the funding arrangements for the Skye Bridge and advised on the potential privatisation of water facilities in Scotland.

The Skye bridge was the first private finance initiative deal in the United Kingdom. Quayle Munro became the preferred adviser for the majority of PFI deals in Scotland until the introduction of the Scottish Futures Trust in 2008.

In June 1993, Jones, oversaw the flotation of Quayle Munro on the London Stock Exchange. In 2003, he moved the firm's listing from the main stock market to the Alternative Investment Market (AIM).

In 2007 and 2008, Jones made the strategic decision to purchase, New Boathouse Capital and Van Tulleken respectively, both companies based in London, and both corporate finance advisers. In a move to compete in new markets.

From the beginning, the bank, under Jones's stewardship, invested for the long-term in various UK companies and industries. Jones served as a director of numerous different companies including: Bank of Scotland Integrated Finance, Tayside Flow Technologies Limited, Morris Group Limited, Chiltern Invadex PLC and Submersible Television Surveys Limited.

In July 2002, Jones announced that he would retire from his role as chief executive and retain his position as chairman on a part-time basis. He retired from the bank in March 2010.
