= Tony Blackman =

British aviator (1928–2024)

Anthony Lionel Blackman
- Born: 6 April 1928; Southend-on-Sea, Essex
- Died: 13 August 2024 (aged 96)
- Military career
- Allegiance: United Kingdom
- Branch: Royal Air Force
- Service years: 1950–1953
- Units: No. 5 Squadron RAF: No. 11 Squadron RAF: Central Flying School
- Conflicts
- Awards: Order of the British Empire
- Other work: Test pilot Author

Anthony Lionel Blackman OBE FRAeS (6 April 1928 – 13 August 2024) was a British aviator. He served as chief test pilot for Avro.

== Early life ==
Blackman was the son of the radiologist Sydney Blackman (7 December 1898 – 1971) of Kensington Court, who was among the main developers of panoramic radiograph in dentistry. Sydney Blackman, himself the son of Polish immigrants, had been educated at the Grocers' Company School (later known as Hackney Downs School).

His parents, Sydney and Lena Goodman, married in 1923 in Hackney. His sister Rita Mason (1925 – 25 March 2008) was a dental radiologist (oral and maxillofacial radiology), with her father at the Royal Dental Hospital, and she attended Henrietta Barnett School in Hampstead Garden Suburb. His father helped to found the British Society of Dental and Maxillo-facial Radiology.

== Career ==
=== Service career ===
==== Royal Air Force ====
From October 1948 Blackman started his national service at RAF Padgate near Warrington. He joined the RAF in December 1948 as a pilot officer, training for 12 weeks at RAF Wellesbourne at the RAF School of Education, becoming a mathematics and physics instructor at No. 1 Initial Training School at RAF Wittering. He then learned to fly starting in January 1950 at RAF Ternhill with 6 FTS (No. 6 Flying Training School RAF) on the Percival Prentice, on the No. 38 Pilots Course.

His service saw him fly the Vampires and Venoms with Nos 5 and 11 Squadrons, RAF.

Blackman joined the Empire Test Pilots' School (ETPS) as a prelude to working at the Aeroplane and Armament Experimental Establishment (A&AEE), with B Squadron, until August 1956.

=== Test Flying career ===
A contemporary of aviators as John Cunningham, John Farley and Peter Twiss, Blackman was part of a post-war generation of test pilots who combined flight experience with technical and analytical training. A former fighter pilot with a background in mathematics and with a degree in physics from Trinity College, Cambridge, Blackman worked closely with scientists and engineers on problems related to aircraft performance and design.

Blackman tested all three of Britain's nuclear bombers — the Handley Page Victor, the Vickers Valiant and the Avro Vulcan. He also played a significant role in the development of the Hawker Siddeley Nimrod, a maritime patrol aircraft.

==== Avro ====
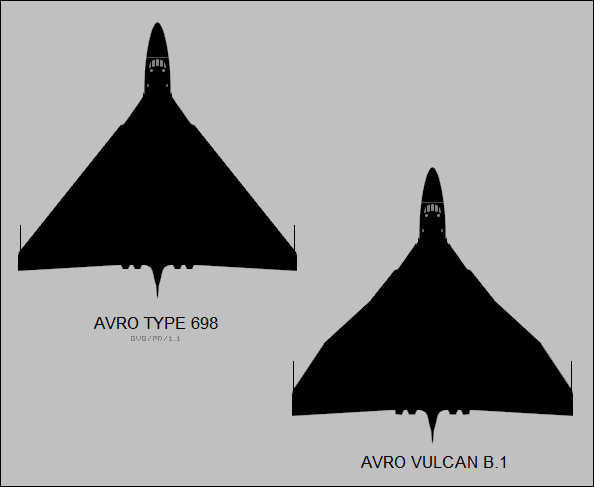
Avro 698 and Avro Vulcan B1 wing shape

Blackman joined Avro as a test pilot, becoming chief test pilot, and flying with Avro from 1956 to 1973. He tested 105 of the Vulcans that were built.

Although the original bomber, the Vulcan B1, had been in service since 1956, Blackman delivered the first of the B2s, considered a massive upgrade to the aircraft, to an operational squadron at RAF Waddington on 1 July 1960.

Avro won a contract to build the Mach 3 Avro 730, and he was to be the test pilot; the project was cancelled in 1957. He was offered to become a Concorde test pilot. He did fly Concorde (G-AXDN, now at Duxford) once, taking the place of Jock Cochrane at RAF Fairford. He was the test pilot for the Hawker Siddeley HS 748 (Avro 748) and the Hawker Siddeley Nimrod (designed by Gilbert Whitehead).

==== Smiths Industries ====
Blackman later worked for Smiths Industries.

== Personal life and death ==
Blackman married Margaret in late 1956. They had two children.

He was made an OBE in the 1974 Birthday Honours. When he was deputy chief test pilot of Hawker Siddeley in Cheshire, he was awarded the Queen's Commendation for Valuable Service in the Air in the 1970 New Year Honours.

Blackman wrote a series of books about the aircraft he had tested, including Vulcan Boys: From the Cold War to the Falklands: True Tales of the Delta V-Bomber, in addition to a series of aviation novels featuring an insurance investigator called Peter Talbot.

Blackman's books are regarded as aviation classics. His autobiography, Test Pilot. My Extraordinary Life in Flight is considered an authoritative work and essential reading for anyone aspiring to develop a knowledge of test flying.

Blackman died on 13 August 2024, at the age of 96.

== See also ==
- Avro Heritage Museum
- John Allam (1924–2019) of Handley Page, deputy test pilot of the Handley Page Victor, chief test pilot of HP from 1965, who first flew the Handley Page Jetstream in August 1967

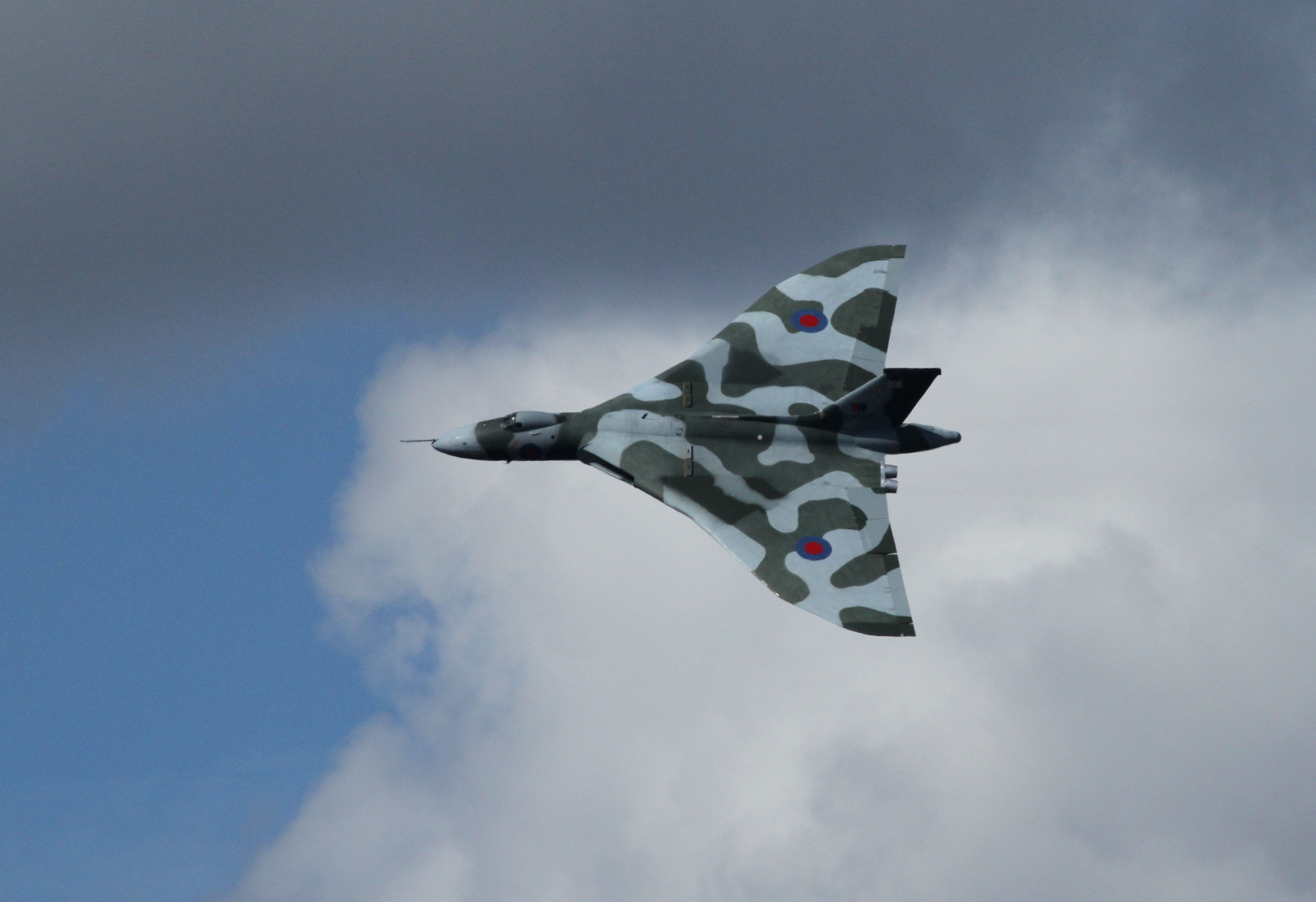
Avro Vulcan seen in July 2010
