= David Cranston =

David Cranston may also refer to:

- David Cranston (British Army officer) (born 1945), retired senior British Army officer
- David Cranston (philosopher) (c. 1480–1512), Scottish scholastic philosopher and theologian
