= Harvard Business School RFC =

(United States) Harvard Business School
- Full name: Harvard Business School Rugby Football Club
- Union: USA Rugby
- Founded: 1963; 63 years ago
- Location: Boston, Massachusetts, U.S.
- Ground: Harvard Business School
- League: NERFU
Team kit

Official website
- hbsclubrugby.com

The Harvard Business School RFC is a rugby union team based at Harvard Business School in Boston, Massachusetts. The club formerly competed in the New England Rugby Football Union (NERFU) and is composed of graduate students from throughout Harvard University.

== History ==
HBS Rugby began in the fall of 1963. Prior to the team's founding, the Harvard Business School sporting culture was dominated by softball, bowling, and ping-pong. Dissatisfied with these options, two Scottish MBA students, Jim Johnstone '65 and Morris McInnes '65, founded the HBS Rugby Club.

The first contingent of around forty interested players began to train at Soldiers Field. Despite the contrary advice of the HBS Dean of Students and an attempt to merge the HBS side with the Harvard College side, the team was established, beginning with a record of 5-2-1 in spring of 1964.

Since its inception, more than 1500 men have played for HBS Rugby.

== Old Boys ==
An HBS Old Boys touring side formally began with a trip to the Freeport Bahamas Easter Festival in 1978. The Club was initially organized by Rowland Moriarty with Michael Rush and Eugene Skowronski assisting in the early days. In 2007, the Old Boys traveled to the World Cup Rugby frenzy in France and completed their thirtieth annual tour with two matches in Provence. In 2008, Grand Cayman Island was the scene for rugby plays and stingrays. The Fall of 2011 found us at the World Cup in New Zealand. Spring, 2012, we played in Bermuda. In June, 2013, the OB's travel to France. Other HBS ruggers have also toured the globe and play for various local sides throughout the world. October 2015 featured a tour to the UK for the Rugby World Cup, and in 2019 the HBS Olde Boys toured Japan in conjunction with the 2019 World Cup in Japan, playing two games vs Keio University and Doshisha University.

== Sponsorship ==
HBS Rugby is supported by The Boston Consulting Group, Harpoon Brewery, Gibson Guitars, Mousse Partners, and Tommy Doyle's Irish Pub.

== Notable HBS Rugby alumni ==
- Robin Buchanan, former dean of London Business School
- Chase Carey, CEO and Executive Chairman of Formula One
- Sir Ronald Cohen, co-founder of Apax Partners
- Ray Dalio, founder of Bridgewater Associates
- Patrick Fitzgerald, lead prosecutor in Scooter Libby, Conrad Black, and Rod Blagojevich trials
- Thomas C. Foley, former United States Ambassador to Ireland
- Theodore Roosevelt IV, great-grandson of President Theodore Roosevelt
- Sir Wilson Whineray, former captain of the All Blacks
- Brian Burke, NHL executive, Stanley Cup champion
