= David Cranston (British Army officer) =

British Army officer

David Alan Cranston CBE
- Born: 20 October 1945 (age 80)
- Military career
- Allegiance: United Kingdom
- Branch: British Army
- Service years: 1966–1995
- Rank: Brigadier
- Service number: 481755
- Units: Royal Artillery; Army Air Corps
- Commands: Commander, 4 Regiment, Army Air Corps (1986–1988); Chief of Staff, 2nd Infantry Division (1988–1990); Commander, British Army Aviation, Germany (1990–1992); Deputy, Head of Mission, European Union Monitoring Mission to the former Yugoslavia (1992); Deputy Commander, Multinational Airmobile Division, Germany (1994–1995)
- Conflicts: Yugoslav Wars
- Awards: Commander of the Order of the British Empire
- Other work: Director General, National Association of Pension Funds

Brigadier David Alan Cranston, CBE (born 20 October 1945) is a retired senior British Army officer. He was Director General of the National Association of Pension Funds from 2000 to 2001.

== Education ==
David Cranston was educated at Strathallan School in Perthshire and the Royal Military Academy, Sandhurst.

== Army ==
Following graduation Cranston was promoted from officer cadet to 2nd lieutenant with the Royal Artillery on 29 July 1966. He was promoted to lieutenant on 29 January 1968, captain on 29 July 1972, and major on 31 December 1977. Cranston transferred from the Royal Artillery to the Army Air Corps on 1 January 1979.

In 1983 Cranston served as Chief of Staff at the headquarters of British Forces in Belize. On 30 June 1984 he was promoted to lieutenant colonel. From 1984 to 1986 he was based at Royal Military College of Science at Shrivenham. In 1986 he was appointed Commander of 4 Regiment, Air Army Corps and in 1988 Chief of Staff of the 2nd Infantry Division. On 31 December 1990 he was promoted to brigadier. From 1990 to 1992 he was Commander of British Army Aviation in Germany.

In 1992 he was appointed Deputy, Head of Mission of the European Union Monitoring Mission to the former Yugoslavia. On 12 June 1993 he was appointed a Commander of the Order of the British Empire. From 1994 to 1995 Cranston was Deputy Commander of the Multinational Airmobile Division based in Germany. He retired from the Army on 14 May 1995.

== Executive appointments ==
- Head of Member Relations, Personal Investment Authority, 1995–1997.
- Head of Group Compliance, The Royal Bank of Scotland, 1997–2000.
- Director General of the National Association of Pension Funds, 2000–2001.
- Non-Executive Director, Voller Energy Group Plc, 2005–2009.
- Non-Executive Director, Skandia UK, 2002–2008.
- Non-Executive Director, National Olympic Committee, 2001–2010.
- Member of the executive board, British Olympic Association, 2007–2010.
- Chairman, British Biathlon Union, 1996–2011.
