= Morris McInnes =

Scottish accountant (1940–2020)

James Morrison McInnes (1 January 1940 – 8 August 2020) was professor emeritus of accounting and formerly dean for academic affairs at the Sawyer Business School of Suffolk University, Boston, Massachusetts. He taught for almost forty years at the MIT Sloan School of Management, ten years as the head of the accounting area and then as a visiting professor and lecturer on the Greater Boston Executive Programme. McInnes held several senior financial executive posts.

== Education ==
McInnes was educated at Strathallan School, near Perth, Scotland. He graduated from the University of St Andrews with a degree in physics and received a PhD and MBA from Harvard Business School. In 1963, he founded the Harvard Business School RFC with fellow Scot Jim Johnstone.

== Career ==
McInnes taught at Harvard Business School, MIT Sloan School of Management and Manchester Business School where he was director of the PhD programme. He was also a visiting professor at Maastricht University in the Netherlands.

His expertise encompassed the design of budgetary control systems, linking strategy and operations, corporate financial management, and international analysis control.

In industry, McInnes served as a financial executive and board member for several international companies. He was the chief financial officer of a company listed on the London Stock Exchange and financial vice president for a major Kuwaiti company.

With his experience McInnes consulted and lectured worldwide. He published papers in numerous academic and professional journals including Accounting, Strategic Management Journal, Journal of International Business Studies and Certified Accountant.

McInnes was a past president of the Boston chapter of Financial Executives International. In 2011, he was awarded the F. Gorham Brigham Jr. Lifetime Achievement Award by the Boston Business Journal.

== Publications ==
Under the name, J M McInnes, he has published six books:

- J M McInnes (2011). Computer-based models in the decision making and control process. Nabu Press. ISBN 978-1175741257.
- J M McInnes (2011). Corporate management of productivity: an international comparison. Nabu Press. ISBN 978-1175765321.
- J M McInnes (2011). Corporate modelling for setting and monitoring investment strategy. Nabu Press. ISBN 978-1175748676.
- J M McInnes (2011). Corporate planning and control of productivity: an empirical study. Nabu Press. ISBN 978-1175757050.
- J M McInnes (2011). Planning and monitoring productivity: linking strategy and operations. Nabu Press. ISBN 978-1179979861.
- J M McInnes and Peter Brownell (2013). Budgetary Participation, Motivation and Managerial Performance - Primary Source Edition. Nabu Press. ISBN 978-1289690939.
