= G R 'Jock' Bryce =

Scottish test pilot (1921–2014)

Gabe Robb 'Jock' Bryce, OBE (27 April 1921 – 7 May 2014) was a British aviator and chief test pilot for Vickers-Armstrongs and later the British Aircraft Corporation. He flew, as pilot in command or Co-Pilot, the first flight of eleven prototype aircraft during his time as a test pilot, including the VC10.

== Biography ==
Jock Bryce was born in Glasgow in 1921 and educated at Glasgow High School. He followed his brother into the Royal Air Force in 1939, joining as a sergeant and undergoing flight training at Prestwick and Warmell.

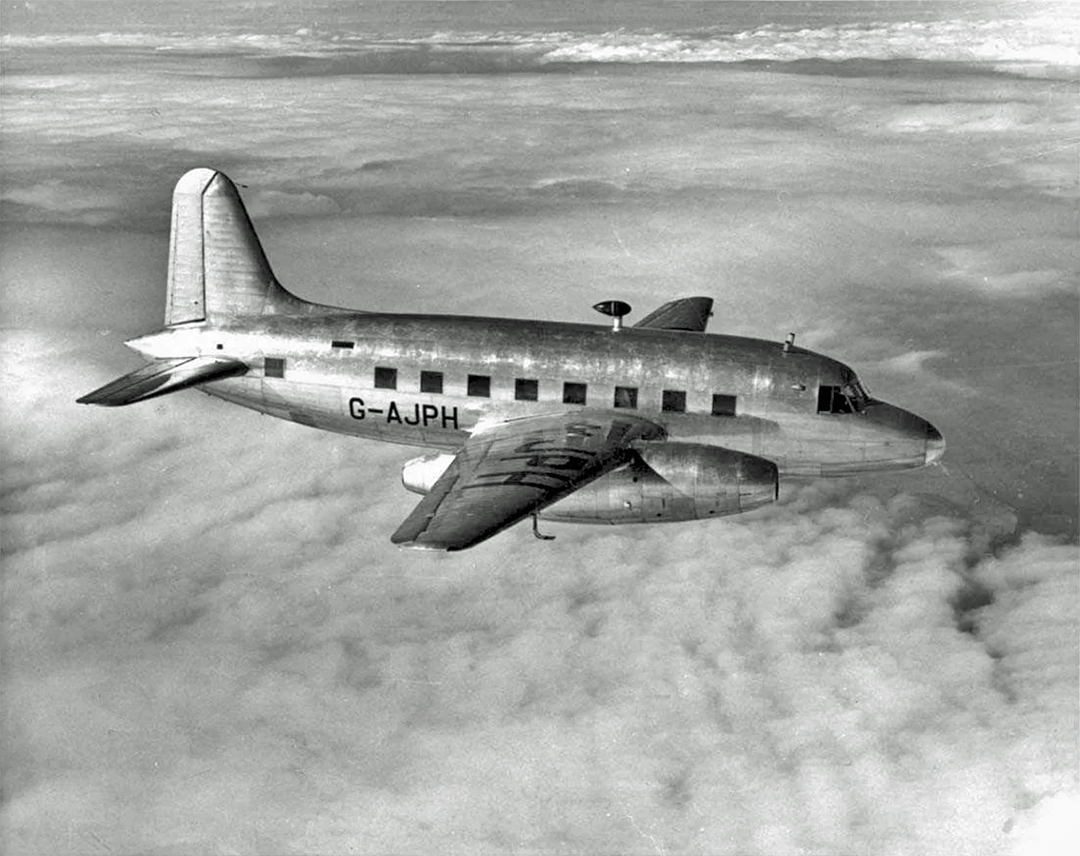
The jet-powered Vickers Nene Viking G-AJPH

In 1940 he was posted to Special Duty Flight flying Bristol Blenheims from RAF Leuchars, RAF Wick, and RAF Christchurch. In 1942, Bryce was posted to 172 Squadron at Chivenor to fly Wellingtons on anti-submarine patrol. He was commissioned in February 1943 and posted to Dorval as part of No. 45 (North Atlantic) Group on the North Atlantic Ferry Force.

In 1945 he converted to the Douglas C-54 with No. 232 Squadron for duty in South East Asia Command. The squadron was responsible for long-range transport, flying to the Far East and Australia from bases in India and Ceylon. In 1946, Bryce returned to the UK and was posted to the King's Flight at RAF Benson flying the Vickers Viking. Later that year he was demobilised from the RAF with the rank of Flight lieutenant.

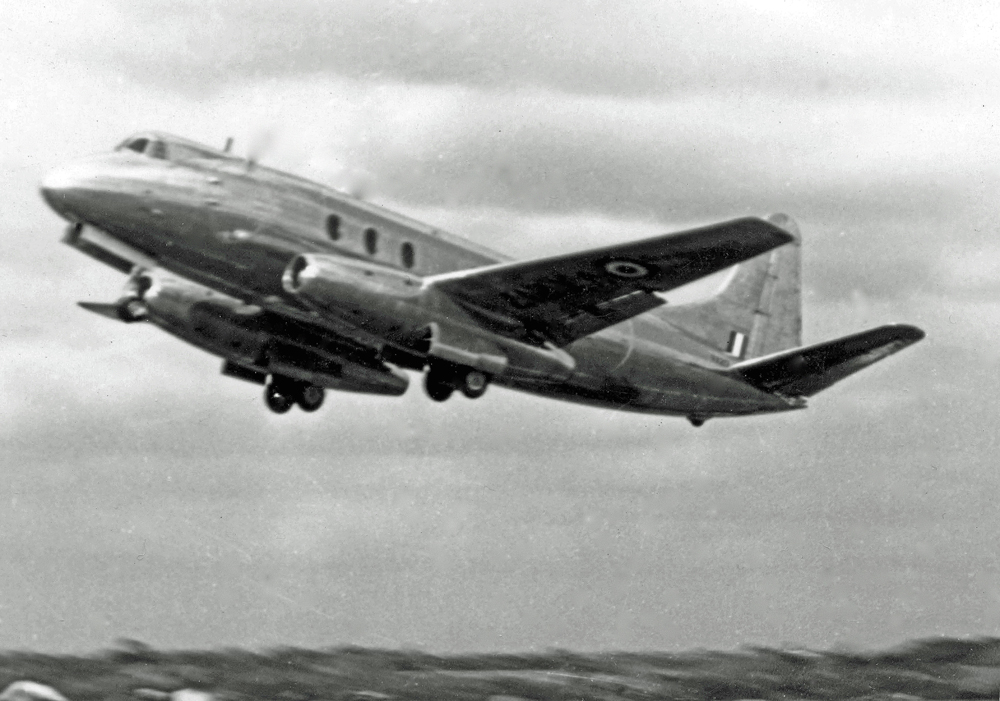
Type 663 Tay Viscount demonstrating at Farnborough in September 1950.

Bryce joined Vickers-Armstrongs as a test pilot at Wisley in 1947, working under Mutt Summers. He was Summers’ co-pilot on the first flight of a number of Vickers aircraft, including the world's first jet powered transport aircraft, the Nene Viking in April 1948, and the Vickers Varsity in July 1949. Summers and Bryce flew the prototype Viscount Type 630 from the grass runway at Wisley in July 1948. Bryce himself was in command for the first flights of later versions of the Viscount, which went on to become one of Britain's most successful post war civil aircraft. He also flew the prototype Tay-powered Viscount from Wisley in March 1950. On May 18, 1951, Summers and Bryce made the first flight in the Vickers Valiant, the first of the RAF's V-bombers. Summers retired a few weeks later, and Bryce took over as the Vickers chief test pilot. On 11 January 1952, Jock was piloting the first Valiant prototype which was lost while making internal noise measurements for the V.1000 programme.Testing included engine shutdowns and re-lights, one of which caused a fire in the port wing. The three observers in the rear did not have ejection seats but all survived. Jock's co-pilot, Squadron Leader B.H.D.Foster from the RAF, ejected first, however he struck the fin and was killed. Bryce ejected successfully and Martin Baker recorded this event as only their eleventh successful ejection at the time. In September 1953, Bryce made the first flight of the Valiant B2, with Brian Trubshaw, later chief test pilot of Concorde, as his co-pilot. Finished in a gloss black night operations paint scheme, the B2 was intended to serve as a Pathfinder aircraft, flying at low level to mark targets for the main bomber force. However, this version of the Valiant did not go into production.

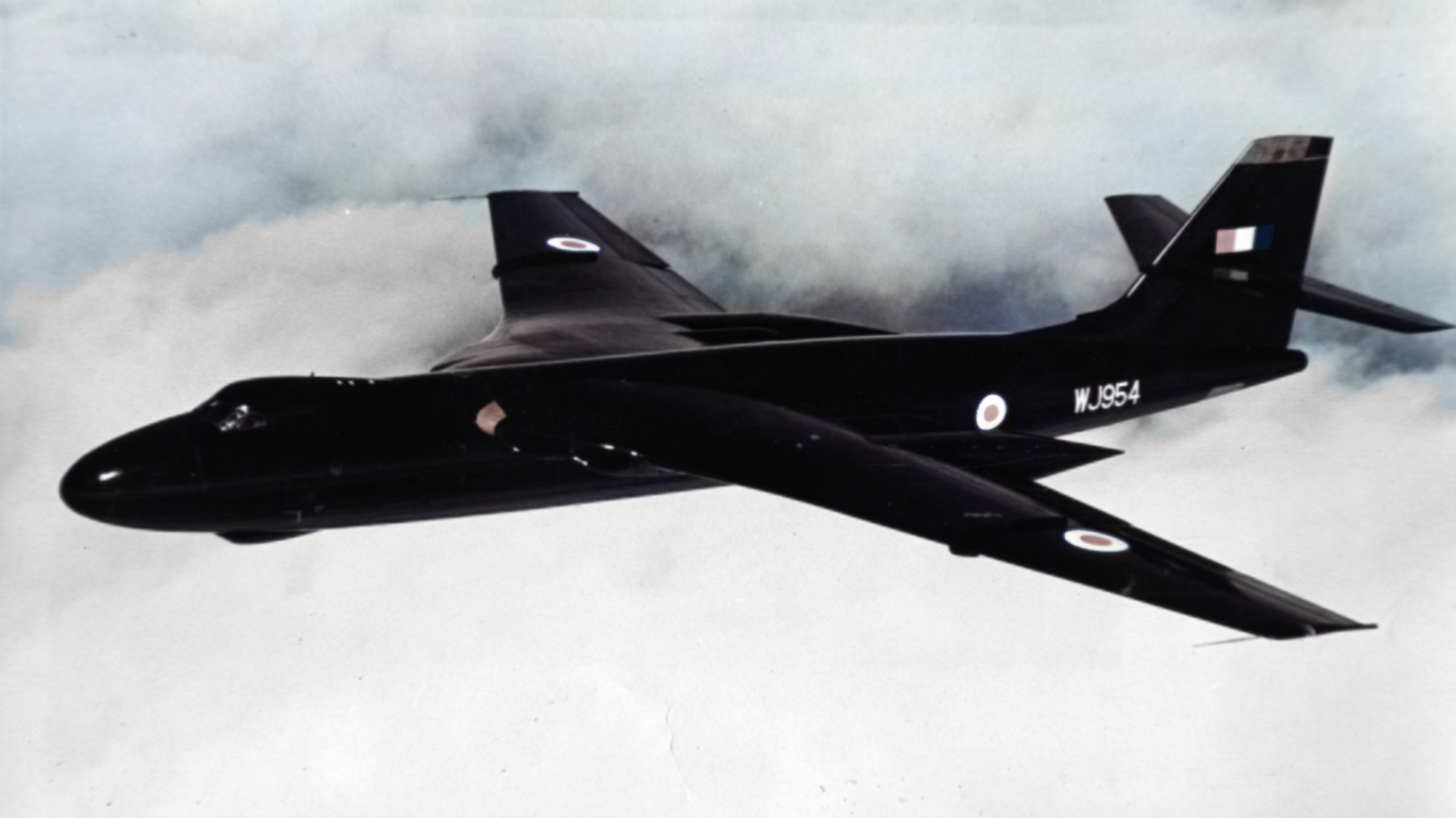
Vickers Valiant B2 during its first flight on 4 September 1953.

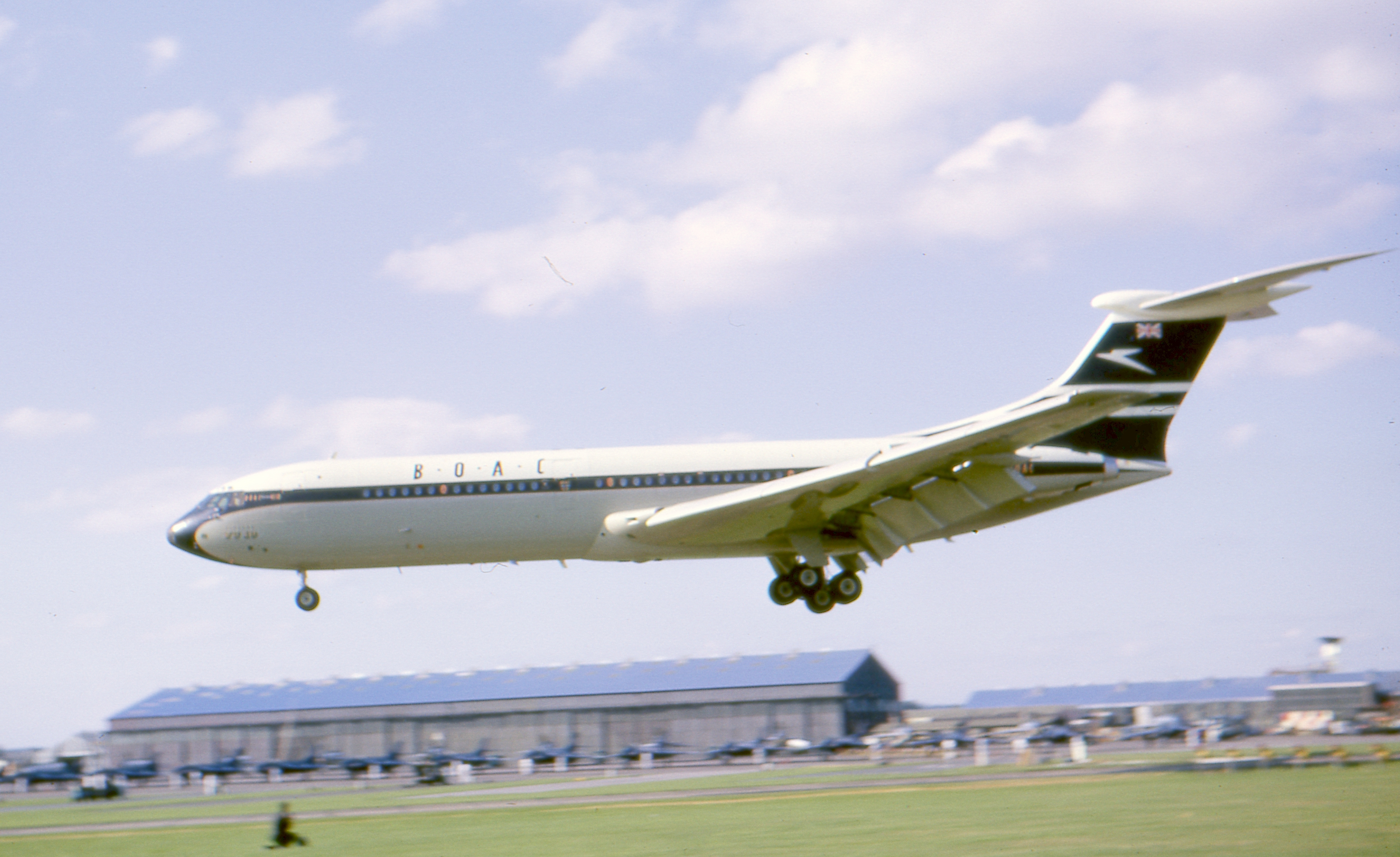
The prototype Vickers VC10, G-ARTA, at the Farnborough Airshow, September 1962 shortly after its first flight in June 1962.

Bryce made the first test flight of the Vickers Vanguard in January 1959 with a short hop from Weybridge to Wisley, some three miles away. Along with co-pilot Brian Trubshaw, Bryce also flew the prototype Vickers VC10 on its maiden flight from Weybridge on 29 June 1962. The original plan had been to transport the finished aircraft by road to Wisley, where the runway was a little longer, and take off from there, landing at Boscombe Down. Due to the delay dismantling would have caused, Bryce convinced managing director Sir George Edwards to let him fly the aircraft out of Wisley to Boscombe Down. Following a successful takeoff and flight test, and unknown to anyone else at BAC, Bryce did not fly to Boscome Down but returned to Wisley and successfully landed on the short, 6,200 ft long runway.

The last prototype Bryce flew before retiring in 1964 was the twin-engined BAC One-Eleven on 20 August 1963. The aircraft took off from Hurn and was later based at Wisley for flight trials. That same prototype aircraft, G-ASHG, was later destroyed during a test flight on 22nd October 1963. The aircraft crashed following a deep stall, killing all the crew including test pilot Mike Lithgow.

When he retired from the post of chief test pilot at British Aircraft Corporation in 1964, he handed over to his deputy, Brian Trubshaw. Bryce was appointed sales director at Weybridge and retired in 1975 as vice-president (Corporate Aircraft Sales). He was successful in promoting the BAC 1–11 to major American corporations, including Tenneco and Ford Motor Company.

== Personal life ==
He married his wife Nancy in 1947.

After retirement, Bryce ran a luxury cat hotel near Wisley airfield and was a volunteer at Brooklands Museum. He was made an OBE in 1957 and elected a Fellow of the US Society of Experimental Test Pilots in 1967. He was the first recipient of the prestigious Sir Barnes Wallis Medal, awarded by the Guild of Air Pilots in 1980.

Jock Bryce died age 93 on 7 May 2014.
