= Wilfred Hoare =

English cricketer, schoolmaster, and headmaster

Personal information
- Full name: Wilfred Norman Stewart Hoare
- Born: 23 October 1909; Gloucester, England
- Died: 28 August 2003 (aged 93); Shrewsbury, Shropshire, England
- Nickname: Bunny
- Batting: Right-handed
- Role: Wicket-keeper

Domestic team information
- Years: Team
- 1931: Cambridge University Cricket Club

Career statistics
Competition	First-class
Matches	1
Runs scored	15
Batting average	15
100s/50s	0/0
Top score	11*
Catches/stumpings	1/1
- Source: CricketArchive, 8 January 2016

Wilfred Norman Stewart Hoare (23 October 1909 – 28 August 2003) was an English cricketer, schoolmaster and headmaster of Strathallan School from 1951–1970.

== Early career ==
Hoare was a classics exhibitioner at Christ's College, Cambridge. He was captain of the college rugby and cricket teams, and played one first-class cricket match for the Cambridge University Cricket Club. Hoare played against Nottinghamshire County Cricket Club in a 3-day match at Fenner's in May 1931; the match was drawn.

Following his graduation in 1931, Hoare was appointed as an assistant master at Fettes College in Edinburgh. In 1939 he became housemaster of Glencorse House at Fettes. He held a commission with The Royal Scots during World War II, and served at home and abroad.

During his time in Edinburgh he was captain of the Edinburgh Wanderers rugby club, and a member of Grange Cricket Club. In 1950 he was appointed as the headmaster of Strathallan School, though he did not start until January 1951.

== Strathallan School ==
Hoare arrived at Strathallan at a time when most schools in the United Kingdom were still trying to recover from the effects of World War II. There were few qualified masters and the teaching profession had been neglected. In 1942 the school had also lost its founder, Harry Riley, and was still to find a replacement who shared his vision and zest for success. In Wilfred Hoare, Strathallan found his successor.

One of his first appointments was that of Duncan McCallum, another Fettesian, as second master. Between them they would lead the school until 1975. Hoare introduced a new management style, delegating responsibility to everyone in authority. Everyone was encouraged to contribute to the success of the school regardless of their ability.

Under Hoare's enthusiastic direction, Strathallan embarked on a series of developments and improvements. The school switched to the Cambridge O and A level exams, to try to improve results. A period of time was set aside for pupils to partake in activities; boxing, life-saving, highland dancing, etc. These activities were partially funded by a new tuck shop. A new study block was opened in 1953. The junior school, Riley House, moved to the redeveloped stable block.

The drive to improve academic standards placed a great strain on the staff. As pupil numbers increased, classes had to constantly be reorganised. Each pupil was monitored by the staff, to ensure their progress. By the late fifties, the number of pupils had almost doubled. The choice of sports on offer and competitive school fixtures increased as a result.

In 1957 the school purchased the Mud Flats (playing fields) and part of the east drive. New laboratories were built in 1958, as well as an extension to the study block. Big Acre (playing field) was expanded as was the boundary of the cricket lawn. In 1960 building work commenced on the new chapel. The following years saw the purchase of Coven Trees (house), classrooms harled, dormitories redecorated, the pond drained and stocked with trout, the vegetable garden became the garden pitch, Thorny Shades levelled for hockey, and the excavated soil used to build a causeway across the Dell (valley).

A new sixth form art block and language laboratory was opened in 1964, as well as a new chemistry laboratory. The school also announced plans for a new boys house, as pupil numbers had doubled since 1951. Plans were also made to build a new dining hall. By the late sixties the school was thriving, exam results were excellent, and sports teams competitive.

At the end of the summer term 1970, Hoare retired from the school. After his speech day address that term, he and his wife were piped from the dining hall to their house, the route lined with pupils clapping them home.

Hoare always stressed that any success achieved during his tenure, was due to team work. A devoted board of governors, and dedicated staff, combined with Hoare's desire to succeed, cultivated an excellent environment for achievement. To preserve continuity of policy, Duncan McCallum was appointed as his replacement.

Following his retirement, Hoare moved to Milnathort, then the West Country and finally to Shrewsbury.
