= Hugh Graham Miller =

Scottish academic (1939–2019)

Hugh Graham Miller, OBE FRSE FICFor, (22 November 1939 – 31 October 2019) was professor emeritus of forestry and former head of the Department of Forestry at the University of Aberdeen. In 1981 he was awarded the Scientific Achievement Award by the International Union of Forest Research Organizations.

== Education ==
Hugh Miller was educated at Strathallan School in Perthshire, Scotland, and at the University of Aberdeen, graduating in 1963 with a degree in forestry.

== Career ==
Upon graduation Miller joined the Macaulay Institute for Soil Research in Aberdeen as a scientific officer. In 1970 he was appointed senior scientific officer and principal scientific officer in 1976. He specialised in researching forest bio-geochemistry.

In 1981 he was awarded the Scientific Achievement Award by the International Union of Forest Research Organizations for his 'research in nutrient cycling through forest ecosystems, including processes in the growth response of trees and forest soils to fertilizers'.

In 1984 Miller was appointed professor and head of the Department of Forestry at the University of Aberdeen. He was head of the Department of Forestry until 2000 and retired in 2004.

Professor Miller was president of the Institute of Chartered Foresters (1994-1996); chairman of the United Nations Food and Agriculture Organization Forestry Education Committee to 1998; chairman, Forestry Commission (FC) Research Agency Advisory Committee (1994-2003); chairman, FC Regional Advisory Committee for the North of Scotland (1997-2004); journal editor: Forestry; editorial boards: Tree Physiology, Scandinavian Journal of Forest Research; director, Forest Industries Development Council, IUFRO Working Party on Forestry Education.

In 2012 he was appointed the chairman of PEFC UK Limited.

== Publications ==
- Hugh G Miller (1994). Forest Policy: The International and British Dimensions : (a Teaching Text Prepared for BSc (For) and MSc Students Studying Forestry at the University of Aberdeen). Aberdeen University Library. ISBN 1873502141.
- Hugh G Miller (1995). Forest Policy: The International and British Dimensions. University of Aberdeen. ISBN 1873502168.

== Honours and awards ==
Fellow of the Institute of Chartered Foresters in 1979.

In 1981 he was awarded the Scientific Achievement Award by the International Union of Forest Research Organizations.

Fellow of the Royal Society of Edinburgh in 1985.

Appointed an Officer of the Most Excellent Order of the British Empire in 1996.

In 2007 he was awarded the Medal of the Institute of Chartered Foresters.
