= John Henderson Sinclair =

John Henderson Sinclair (5 November 1935 – 8 November 2009) was emeritus professor of conveyancing at the University of Strathclyde and the first director of the Glasgow Graduate School of Law in Glasgow, Scotland.

== Education ==
John Henderson Sinclair was born in Glasgow and educated at Craigholme School, Glasgow Academy and Strathallan School in Perthshire. He graduated with a BA from Queen's University Belfast and with an LLB from the University of Glasgow.

== Career ==
Following university Sinclair practised as a solicitor with Leslie Wolfson & Co and then privately. In 1970 he was appointed as a lecturer in conveyancing at the University of Strathclyde. Sinclair was appointed the first director of the Diploma in Legal Practice at the university in 1981. From 1983 to 1993 he was clerk, treasurer and fiscal of the Royal Faculty of Procurators in Glasgow, becoming an honorary member of the faculty in 1997.

In 1992 Sinclair was appointed the first professor of conveyancing at the University of Strathclyde. He was also appointed the first director of the Glasgow Graduate School of Law in 1996. (Glasgow Graduate School of Law was a combined effort between the University of Strathclyde and the University of Glasgow to provide further education for both graduates and professionals. The collaboration between the two universities ended in 2011.)

For thirty years Sinclair was the editor of the Memorandum Book (the Wee Red Book), published by the Scottish Law Agents Society. Sinclair was also the author of the Handbook of Conveyancing Practice in Scotland, now in its sixth edition. In 2002 he was appointed emeritus professor of conveyancing by the University of Strathclyde.

== Publications ==
- John H Sinclair; Euan Sinclair; Ann Stewart (2011). Conveyancing Practice in Scotland (6th ed.). A&C Black. ISBN 978-1847668813.
