= John Buchan Ross =

British Royal Air Force officer

John Buchan Ross QHS CStJ
- Born: 3 July 1912; Tayport, Fife, Scotland
- Died: 24 January 2009 (aged 96); Taunton, Somerset, England
- Military career
- Allegiance: United Kingdom
- Branch: Royal Air Force
- Service years: 1935 – 1970
- Rank: Air Commodore
- Service number: 23345
- Conflicts: Second World War; Malaya Emergency
- Awards: Commander of The Most Venerable Order of the Hospital of St. John of Jerusalem (CStJ); Mentioned in despatches (2)

Air Commodore Dr. John Buchan Ross, QHS, CStJ, (3 July 1912 – 24 January 2009) was a senior British Royal Air Force officer who served from 1935 in Iraq, the East Asia during World War II and in the Malaya Emergency.

== Education ==
John Buchan Ross was born in Tayport and educated at Strathallan School in Perthshire, Scotland. He graduated from the University of Edinburgh with a MB ChB and DTM&H.

== Career ==
Ross joined the Royal Air Force in 1935 and was posted to Iraq where he served as squadron medical officer. On 3 January 1938 he was granted a short term commission as a flying officer for three years on the active list having held seniority since 3 January 1937. On 3 January 1939 he was promoted to flight lieutenant having held seniority since 3 January 1938.

Following the outbreak of World War II he was posted to the Far East. He specialised in tropical medicine and the treatment of malaria. In December 1941 he was promoted to squadron leader on a temporary basis, and not permanently until 1 September 1945.

On 1 July 1948 Ross was promoted to wing commander, and on 1 October 1957 he was promoted to group captain. He was mentioned in despatches on 10 December 1957 for his distinguished service in Malaya. Ross was appointed a Commander of The Most Venerable Order of the Hospital of St. John of Jerusalem on 14 January 1964.

On 1 July 1964 he was promoted to air commodore, and on 25 August 1969 he was appointed Honorary Surgeon to The Queen, a position he held until his retirement. Ross retired from the Royal Air Force at his own request on 16 June 1970.
