= Lawrence Urquhart =

Scottish businessman (1935–2025)

Lawrence McAllister Urquhart (24 September 1935 – 13 April 2025) was a Scottish businessman; Chairman of Burmah Castrol, Scottish Widows, airports operator BAA Limited, and a director of Lloyds TSB, Imerys and Kleinwort Benson.

== Early life ==
Educated at Strathallan School he studied law at King's College London. Soon after he joined Price Waterhouse where he qualified as a chartered accountant.

== Career ==
After a stint in Venezuela with Shell, Urquhart joined Burmah Castrol, where he was Chief Executive, 1982–1985, Group Managing Director, Burmah Oil plc 1985–1988 and Group Chief Executive, 1988–1990. Urquhart retired as Chairman in 1993 and took on several directorships. He was on the board of Dresdner Kleinwort Benson Imerys, and Chairman of Scottish Widows (Lloyds TSB). In 1997, Urquhart became chairman of BAA Limited where he stayed until 2002.

== Personal life ==
Urquhart was married to Elizabeth and had four children. He died on 13 April 2025, at the age of 89.
