= Brian Trubshaw =

British test pilot (1924–2001)

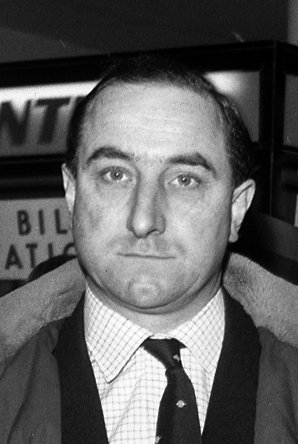
Brian Trubshaw

Brian Trubshaw as test pilot at the controls of Concorde

Ernest Brian Trubshaw, CBE, MVO (29 January 1924 – 24 March 2001) was a leading test pilot, and the first British pilot to fly Concorde, in April 1969.

== Early life ==
Brian Trubshaw was born in Liverpool in 1924, although he grew up in Llanelli where his grandfather had married into a family that owned the Western Tinplate Works, later managed by his father Harold (Major H E Trubshaw). He was educated at Winchester College.

His father died in late October 1951, aged 64.

== Career ==
He signed up for the Royal Air Force (RAF) in 1942 at the age of eighteen and went to the United States, where he trained as a pilot flying Stearman biplanes. He joined Bomber Command in 1944, flying Stirlings and Lancasters, transferring a year later to Transport Command.

After the end of the Second World War, he joined the King's Flight, piloting George VI and other members of the British royal family. Then in 1949–50 he taught at the Empire Flying School and the Royal Air Force College at RAF Cranwell.

=== Test pilot ===
Trubshaw then went to Malaya when he was given permission to leave the RAF (Flight Lieutenant Trubshaw retired from the RAF at his own request on 21 May 1950) to take up a role as test pilot for Vickers Armstrongs, where he remained for 30 years; he succeeded G R 'Jock' Bryce as chief test pilot by 1964, and was director of test flighting from 1966. Trubshaw worked on the development of the Valiant V-bomber, the Vanguard, the VC10, and the BAC One-Eleven, and test flew all of these.

He flew on the first flight of the Vickers Valiant on September 4 1953, with pilot Jock Bryce and Flight Officer Roy Holland.

With Jock Bryce, as deputy chief test pilot of BAC, he flew on the first flight of VC10 on Friday June 28 1962. He flew the first flight of the Super VC10 in early May 1964.

=== Concorde ===
He shot to public attention when he first flew Concorde on 9 April 1969 on a flight from Filton to its test base at RAF Fairford. He emerged from Concorde 002's futuristic cockpit with the words: "It was wizard – a cool, calm and collected operation." Weeks earlier he had piloted an early test flight of the identical French prototype Concorde 001, commanded by André Turcat. Trubshaw and Turcat were both awarded the Iven C. Kincheloe Award in 1971, for their work on Concorde.

The British Concorde was planned to first fly in September 1968. In 1970, Concorde was expected to enter service in late 1973. Concorde was to have 4500 hours of test flights, over four times the time of a subsonic aircraft.

On December 1 1971 25 year old Virginia Evans became the first female to fly in Concorde 002. She was the secretary of Conservative MP David Price (British politician); she flew at Mach 2. Jacqueline Cochran, of US, was the first woman to fly at Mach 1 on May 18 1953.

He ended his career as divisional director and general manager of the Filton works of British Aerospace from 1980 to 1986. From 1986 to 1993 he was a member of the board of the Civil Aviation Authority, and worked as an aviation consultant. He authored books on aviation, notably Concorde: The Inside Story.

== Personal life ==
In November 1969 he moved to the £20,000 Northland Cottage on London Road in Tetbury, from Egerton Road in Weybridge.

He married Yvonne Edmondson, née Clapham, on Saturday April 21 1973 at Ashley, Gloucestershire. Six guests attended the marriage, with no music, married by Rev Douglas Gentry.

Always a sports enthusiast, he played cricket for Winchester College and the Royal Air Force, and in later life attained a nine handicap at golf.

In 1992 he lived in Dodington, Gloucestershire.

He was appointed a Member of the Royal Victorian Order in 1948. He was awarded the OBE in 1964 and the CBE in 1970 and was awarded the French Aeronautical Medal in 1976.

A burly, extrovert figure, Trubshaw added golf to his abiding interest in cricket, and later became involved in equestrianism. He was for some years a fence judge at the Badminton Horse Trials.

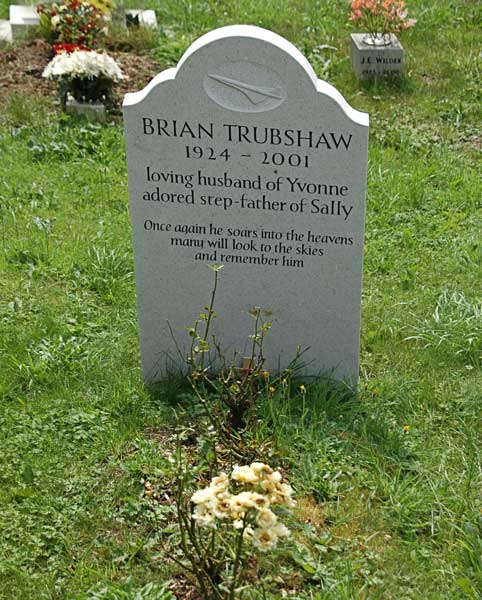
Trubshaw's grave in Cherington

== Death ==
He died in his sleep on 24 March 2001, at his home in Cherington, Gloucestershire.

== Legacy ==
In 1998, Trubshaw was inducted into the International Air & Space Hall of Fame at the San Diego Air & Space Museum.

== See also ==
- John Cochrane – also a British test pilot for the Concorde
