= Richard Henderson (solicitor) =

Scottish solicitor

Richard Mitchell Henderson, CB, WS, (born 17 April 1947) is a Scottish solicitor who was the Solicitor to the Scottish Executive and Head of the Government Legal Service for Scotland between 1999 and 2007.

Richard Mitchell Henderson was educated at Cellardyke Primary School, Anstruther; Strathallan School in Perthshire and the University of Edinburgh.

Henderson served as president of the Law Society of Scotland from 2007 until 2009. In 2009 he was appointed chair of the Administrative Justice and Tribunals Council, Scottish Committee.

In 2007 he was appointed a Companion of the Order of the Bath.
