= Vickers Varsity =

1949 military trainer aircraft based on the Vickers Viking

Varsity
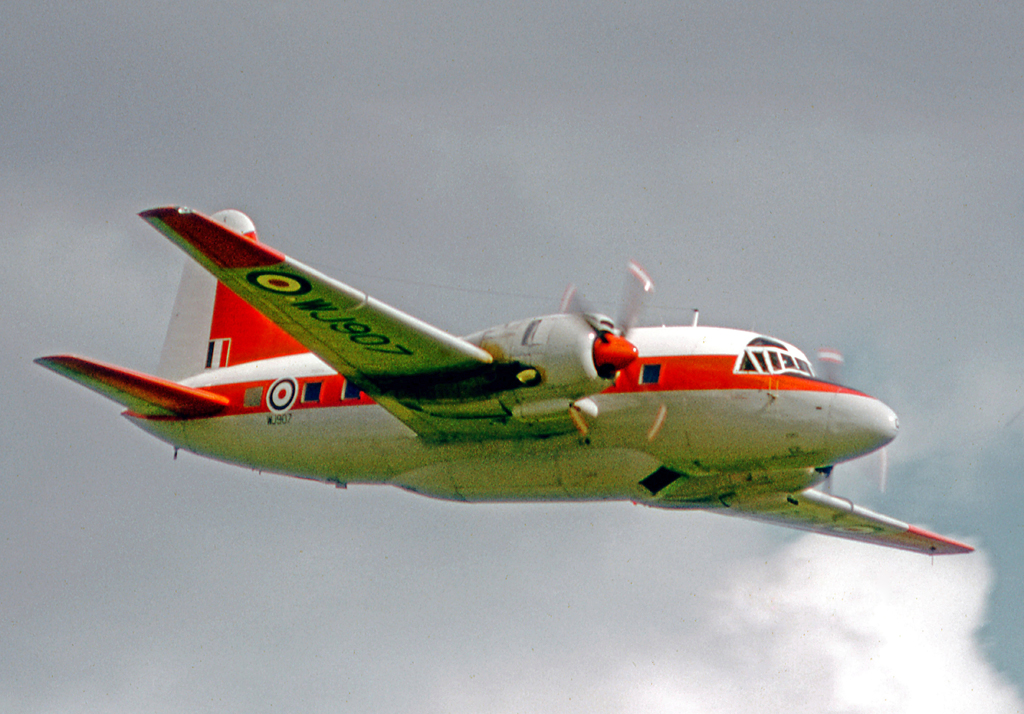
- Varsity T.1 WJ907 of No.1 Air Electronics School in 1971

General information
- Type: military trainer
- Manufacturer: Vickers-Armstrongs
- Primary user: RAF
- Number built: 163

History
- Introduction date: 1951
- First flight: 17 July 1949
- Retired: 1976
- Developed from: Vickers VC.1 Viking

The Vickers Varsity is a retired British twin-engined crew trainer operated by the Royal Air Force from 1951 to 1976.

== Design and development ==
The Varsity was developed by Vickers and based on the Viking and Valetta to meet Air Ministry Specification T.13/48 for a twin-engined training aircraft to replace the Wellington T10 and the Valetta T3 and T4. The main differences were the wider-span wings, longer fuselage and tricycle undercarriage. There was also a ventral pannier to allow a trainee bomb aimer to lie in a prone position and a bomb bay with a capacity for 24 x 25lb smoke & flash bombs. The first prototype Type 668 Varsity VX828 was first flown by J 'Mutt' Summers and G R 'Jock' Bryce from Wisley on 17 July 1949.

A civil version the VC.3 was planned but with the success of the VC.2 Viscount the idea was abandoned.

== Operational history ==
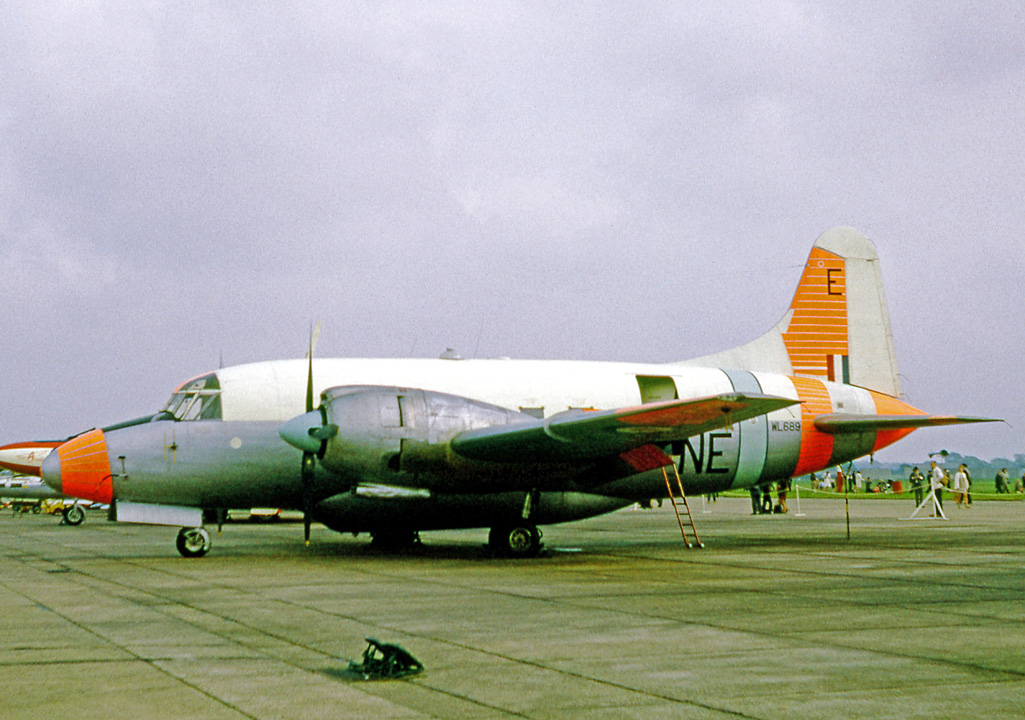
Varsity T.1 of the Royal Air Force College Cranwell in 1968

The Varsity was introduced to replace the Wellington T10 trainer. Following deliveries to trials units the first production aircraft were delivered for operational use in 1951 to No. 201 Advanced Flying School at RAF Swinderby, where they were used to train pilots to fly multi-engined aircraft. It also equipped two Air Navigator Schools in 1952, and the Bomber Command Bombing school, with the job of training crews for RAF Bomber-Command's V-bomber crews.

The Swedish Air Force operated a single Varsity from January 1953 to 1973 mainly for electronic intelligence missions. The Swedish military designation was Tp 82.

The Varsity was withdrawn from service with the RAF in May 1976, its role as a pilot trainer being taken over by the Scottish Aviation Jetstream T1, and as a navigation trainer by the Hawker Siddeley Dominie T1.

The last flying example (Serial WL679) was operated by the Royal Aircraft Establishment; it was retired into preservation at the Royal Air Force Museum Midlands, Cosford in 1992.

== Operators ==
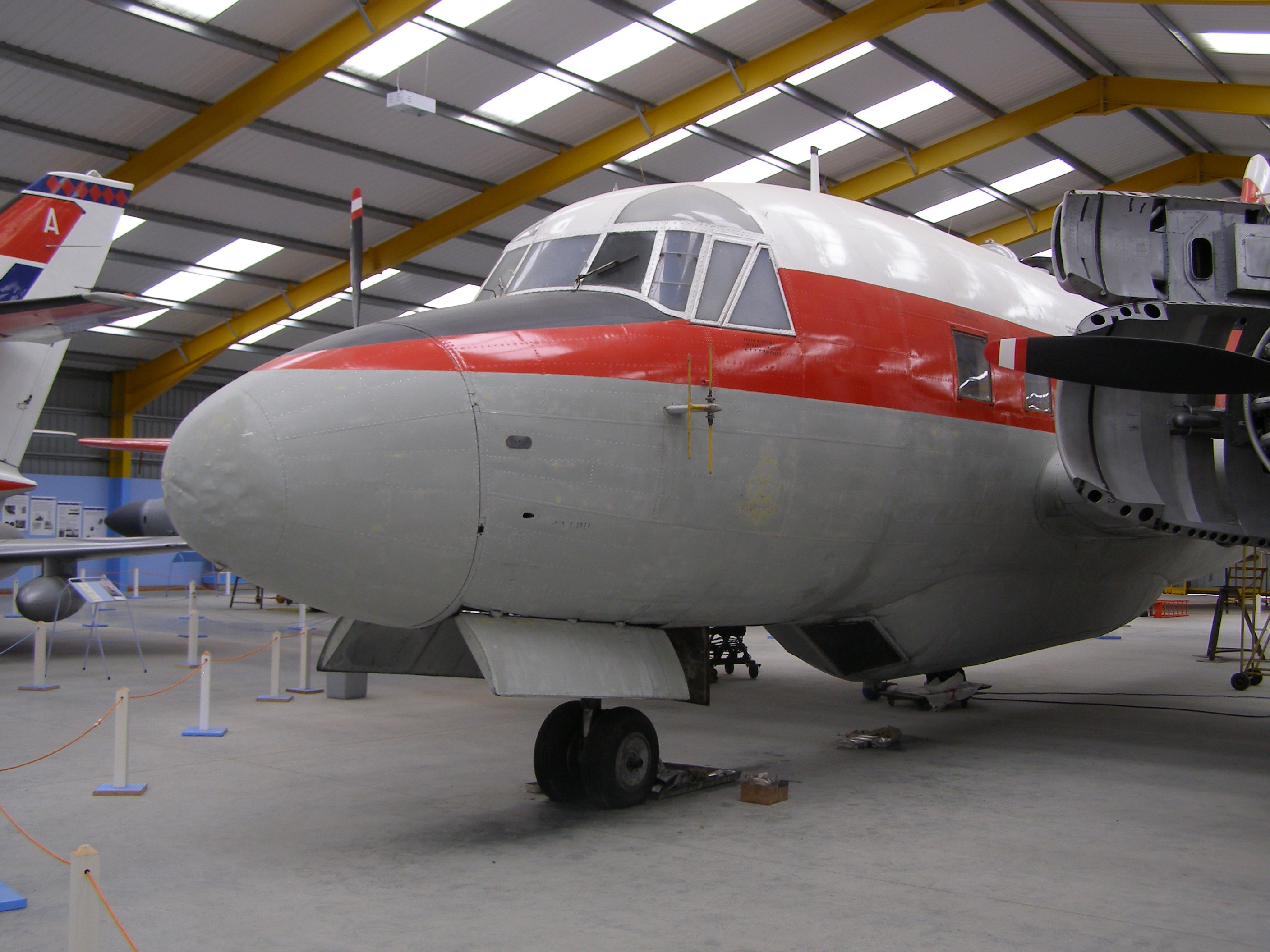
Varsity T1 on display at the Newark Air Museum

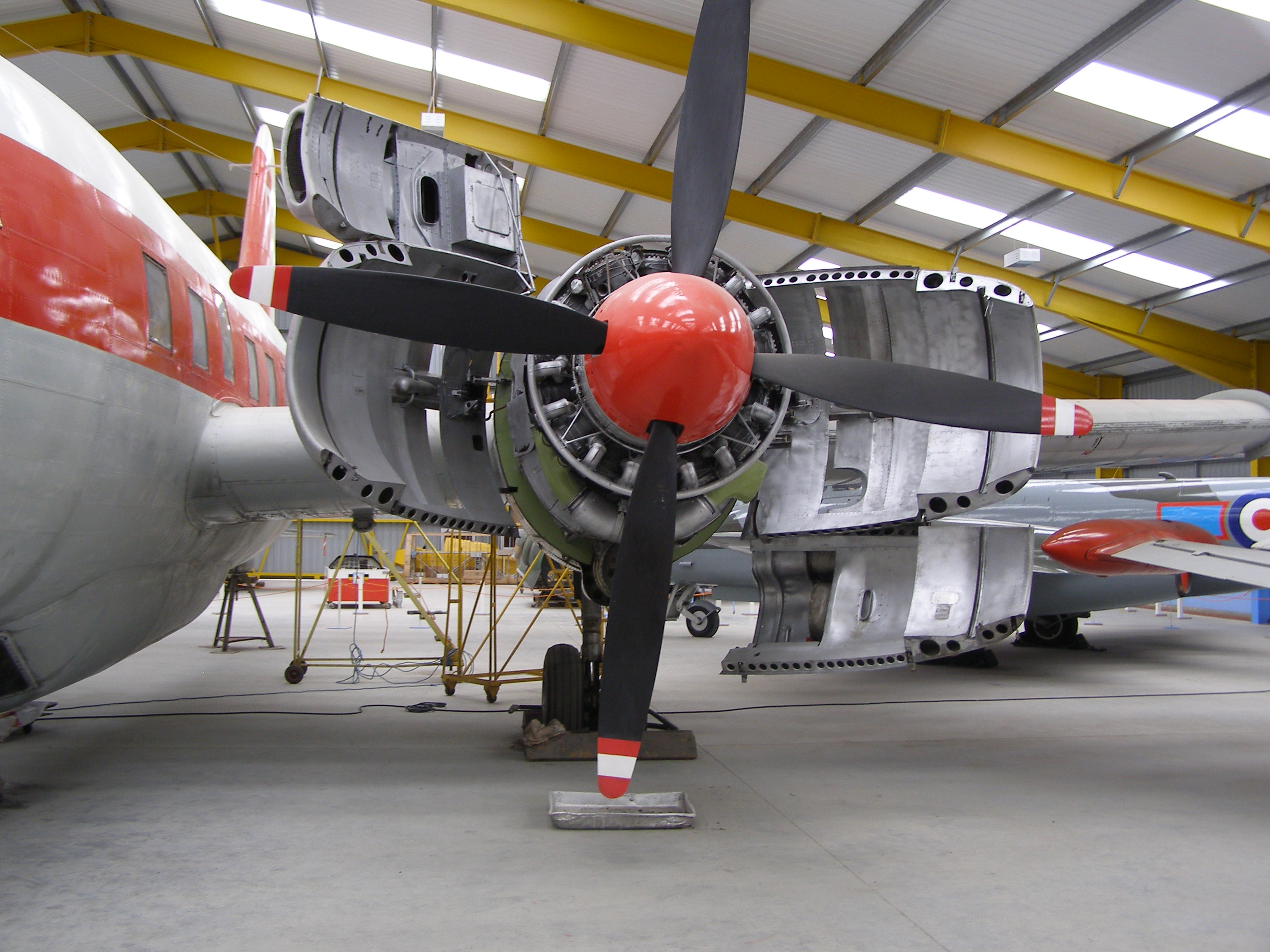
Varsity T1 on display at the Newark Air Museum

Jordan

- Royal Jordanian Air Force

Sweden

- Swedish Air Force

United Kingdom

- Aeroplane and Armament Experimental Establishment
- Royal Air Force
  - No. 51 Squadron RAF
  - No. 97 Squadron RAF
  - No. 115 Squadron RAF
  - No. 116 Squadron RAF
  - No. 151 Squadron RAF
  - No. 173 Squadron RAF
  - No. 187 Squadron RAF
  - No. 192 Squadron RAF
  - No. 204 Squadron RAF
  - No. 527 Squadron RAF
  - Bomber Command Bombing School RAF
  - Central Navigation and Control School RAF
  - Royal Air Force College Cranwell
  - Central Flying School
  - No. 4 Flying Training School RAF
  - No. 5 Flying Training School RAF
  - No. 6 Flying Training School RAF
  - No. 201 Advanced Flying School RAF later named No. 11 Flying Training School RAF
  - No. 1 Air Navigation School RAF
  - No. 2 Air Navigation School RAF
  - No. 3 Air Navigation School RAF
  - No. 6 Air Navigation School RAF
  - No. 1 Air Electronics School RAF
  - No. 1 Radio School RAF
- Royal Aircraft Establishment
- Empire Test Pilot's School

== Aircraft on display ==
=== Germany ===
- WF382 – Varsity T.1 in storage at Berlin-Tegel Airport for the Allied Museum in Berlin.

=== Sweden ===
- 82001 – Tp 82 on static display at the Swedish Air Force Museum in Linköping, Östergötland.

=== United Kingdom ===
- WF369 – Varsity T.1 on static display at the Newark Air Museum in Newark, Nottinghamshire.
- WF372 – Varsity T.1 on static display at the Brooklands Museum in Weybridge, Surrey.
- WJ903 – Varsity T.1 nose section on static display at Aeroventure in Doncaster, South Yorkshire.
- WJ945 – Varsity T.1 is currently stored dismantled at the South Wales Aircraft Museum at St Athan after previosuly being on static display at the now defunct Classic Air Force in Newquay, Cornwall.
- WL626 – Varsity T.1 on static display at the East Midlands Airport Aeropark in Castle Donington, Leicestershire.
- WL679 – Varsity T.1 was recently dismantled and moved by road to the Chetton Heritage Centre near Bridgnorth, Shropshire having been donated by the Royal Air Force Museum Cosford in Cosford, Shropshire.

== Specifications (T Mk 1) ==
Data from Vickers Aircraft since 1908.

General characteristics

- Crew: four
- Length: 67 ft 6 in (20.57 m)
- Wingspan: 95 ft 7 in (29.13 m)
- Height: 23 ft 11 in (7.29 m)
- Wing area: 974 sq ft (90.5 m^{2})
- Empty weight: 27,040 lb (12,265 kg)
- Powerplant: 2 × Bristol Hercules 264 14-cylinder radial engine, 1,950 hp (1,450 kW) each

Performance

- Maximum speed: 288 mph (463 km/h, 250 kn) at 10,000 feet (3,000 m)
- Range: 2,648 mi (4,262 km, 2,301 nmi)
- Service ceiling: 28,700 ft (8,700 m)
- Rate of climb: 1,400 ft/min (7.1 m/s)

Armament

- Bombs: 600 pounds (270 kg) practice bombs in an ventral pannier

== See also ==
- Vickers VC.1 Viking
- Vickers Valetta

Related lists

- List of aircraft of the Royal Air Force
