= Eric McKellar Watt =

Scottish businessman

Alexander 'Eric' McKellar Watt, OBE (16 March 1920 – 12 July 2001) was a Scottish entrepreneur, the founder and chairman of McKellar Watt Limited, at one time Britain's largest privately owned meat processing company. The company became known for its slogan 'McKellar Watt for Meatiness'. In 1983 he was awarded an OBE in recognition of his business achievements.

== Early life ==
Watt was born in Glasgow and educated at Glasgow Academy and Strathallan School in Perthshire. At the age of nineteen he volunteered to join the Army as a captain in the Royal Army Service Corps. He served with Bernard Montgomery's Eighth Army in North Africa, Palestine and Greece. Whilst on patrol in Greece in 1942 he and his patrol were caught by sniper fire. McKellar Watt suffered severe head injuries and gunshot wounds to his legs. His men thought he was dead but emergency treatment saved his life. He spent eighteen months in an army hospital in Killearn having his body rebuilt and learning to walk again.

== McKellar Watt Limited ==
Before he had joined the army, he worked for 18 months in his father's chain of five Glasgow butcher shops. McKellar Watt Limited was founded in May 1948 after he had been invalided out of the army. On receiving a lump sum of £500 from the army and a £700 disability grant he started the business. He opened a small factory in the Townhead area of the city, initially producing sausages, potted meat, black puddings and potato croquettes; the quality of his sausages, in particular, soon became a talking point around Glasgow.

In 1954 when fire gutted a nearby firm's premises in Dobbies Loan, he acquired the site and the second factory was soon in operation. After only six years in business the company was employing over 200 people. In 1959 the second factory reached capacity and McKellar Watt Ltd purchased a nearby competitor on Old Shettleston Road. Further nearby property purchases over the years meant the site occupied a total of 7.5 acres by the time of Eric McKellar Watt's retirement in 1985.

The constant yet careful expansion of McKellar Watt Ltd, coupled with a quality product range provedsuccessful. The company focused on producing chilled sausage and meat based bakery products which were distributed through depots in Dundee, Manchester and Birmingham. Following the 1973 oil crisis the cost of distributing chilled foods on a daily basis became too expensive. Management decided to withdraw from the chilled food market in England and replace it with frozen food which required less frequent deliveries.

From 1976 the frozen food sector of the business grew rapidly., with widening of the product range to include frozen flans and quiches. Both products became bestsellers under the 'McKellar Watt' brand and supermarket own label name. By the early eighties the frozen food sector of the business accounted for 50% of turnover and the firm was exporting its products to Hong Kong, countries in Africa and the Middle East.

In March 1985 after almost forty years Watt sold his business to Freshbake Foods Group Plc. At the time of his retirement the company employed more than 600 people. The factory had recently undergone a large-scale redevelopment and the future was very promising. In 1988 Campbells Soup Company acquired Freshbake Foods Group Plc and by May 1989 Freshbake had been merged.
