= Alan Brash (pharmacologist) =

Scottish professor and researcher of pharmacology

Alan Richard Brash (born 1949) is a professor of pharmacology at Vanderbilt University. He is a leading authority on the biosynthesis of prostoglandins and eicosanoids.

== Biography ==
=== Education ===
Brash was educated at Strathallan School near Perth, Scotland and Downing College, Cambridge, where he was elected a scholar. He graduated with a BA in medical sciences in 1970 and proceeded to the University of Edinburgh to study for his PhD, graduating in 1976. Brash was then appointed a research fellow in the Department of Clinical Pharmacology at the Royal Postgraduate Medical School in London. Thereafter, he moved to Vanderbilt University.

=== Research ===
During his time at Vanderbilt, Brash's research has focused on the analysis of the mechanisms of formation and transformation of lipoxygenase products with an interest in their physiological role. His findings have initiated further research on stereochemical aspects of lipoxygenase catalysis and on the role of epithelial lipoxygenases.

Furthermore, his research has led to more work on the biochemistry of the CYP74 family of cytochrome P450s, and on the catalase-related hemoproteins which also metabolize fatty acid hydroperoxides. As of 2023, he had published more than 250 research papers.

In October 2013 he was elected a Fellow of the American Association for the Advancement of Science.
