= Quayle Munro =

British merchant bank

- Industry: Merchant Bank
- Founded: 1983
- Headquarters: London, England, UK
- Key people: Andrew Adams, CEO
- Website: www.quaylemunro.com

Quayle Munro was a merchant bank founded in Edinburgh, Scotland, in 1983. The bank specialised in corporate finance advice. In 2012 the firm moved its headquarters to London. Quayle Munro was acquired by Houlihan Lokey in January 2018.

== History ==
The company was founded by Ian Quayle Jones and Michael Munro. Jones had previously been an executive director of the British Linen Bank and Munro a director of East of Scotland Investment Managers. The company was set up to provide 'professional financial services to industrial and commercial companies, particularly those operating in Scotland and the North of England'. The company office was at 42 Charlotte Square and the first chairman was Sir Alan Smith.

In the 1980s, the company was involved in Dawson International's £650 million bid for Coats PLC and the £135 million full placing and listing of Shanks Group. Quayle Munro also assisted the Scottish Office with the privatisation of ScotRail and the Scottish Bus Group, the disposal of Scottish Enterprise's investment portfolio, the funding arrangements for the Skye Bridge and were advisers on the options regarding privatisation of water facilities in Scotland.

The Skye bridge deal was the first private finance initiative (PFI) deal in the United Kingdom. Quayle Munro became the preferred adviser for the majority of PFI deals in Scotland until the introduction of the Scottish Futures Trust in 2008.

In March 1993, the bank announced that it would be making a reverse takeover of East of Scotland Industrial Investments. The new company would be called Quayle Munro Holdings and would seek a listing on the London Stock Exchange. In June 1993, Quayle Munros shares' commenced trading on the Stock Exchange.

In 2003, Quayle Munro, moved its listing from the main stock market to the Alternative Investment Market (AIM). Ian Jones, chairman, stated that 'the AIM did not exist in 1993 and was now more appropriate for the company's structure'.

In July 2007, Quayle Munro acquired New Boathouse Capital in London for £7.5 million, to expand its corporate finance business. The bank also bought London based, Van Tulleken, a corporate advisory firm specialising in media and information technology in April 2008.

In July 2012, the bank moved its headquarters to London, to focus on its corporate finance business. The project finance business based in Edinburgh was sold to senior management in September 2012, with Quayle Munro Holdings retaining a 30% share in the new company, Quayle Munro Project Finance.

In July 2013, Quayle Munro Holdings announced that it would be delisting from the Stock Exchange to become a private firm. The move was designed to simplify the company's structure and streamline costs.

In January 2018, Quayle Munro was acquired by Houlihan Lokey.
