= Alan Smith (RAF officer) =

Royal Air Force fighter pilot, born 1917

Sir Alan Smith
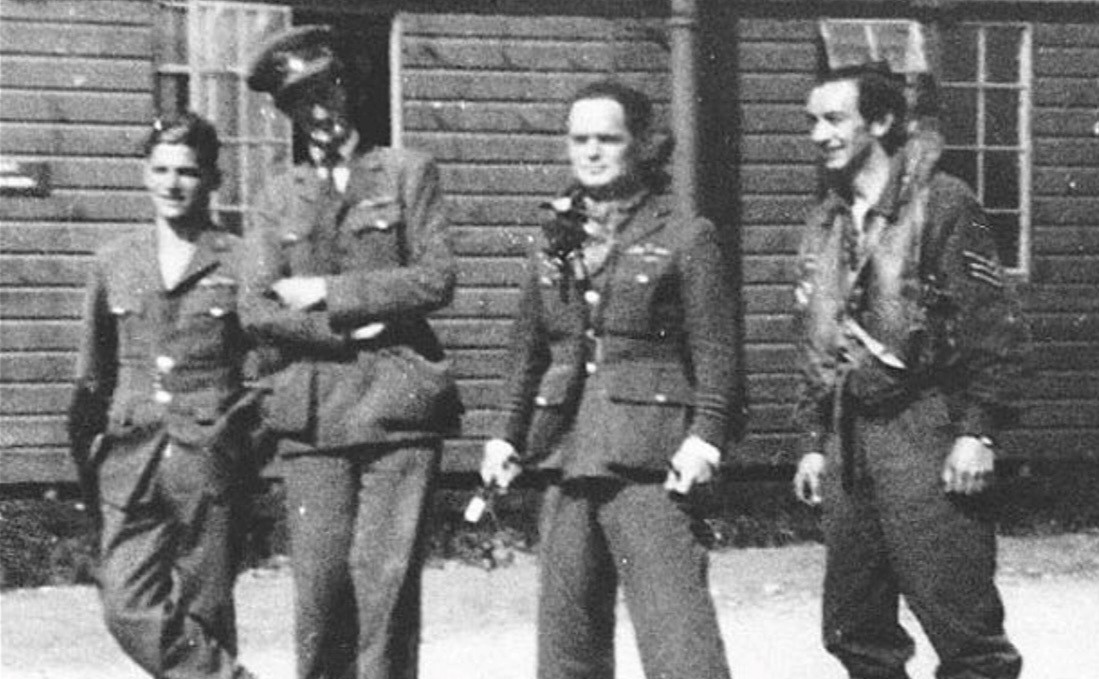
- Born: 14 March 1917; South Shields, England
- Died: 1 March 2013 (aged 95); Perth, Scotland
- Military career
- Allegiance: United Kingdom
- Branch: Royal Air Force
- Service years: 1939–1945
- Rank: Flight Lieutenant
- Nicknames: Smith (right) with Johnnie Johnson, Hugh Dundas and Douglas Bader at RAF Tangmere in c. 1941
- Units: No. 616 Squadron RAF; No. 93 Squadron RAF
- Conflicts: Second World War: Operation Torch
- Awards: Knight Bachelor; Commander of the Order of the British Empire; Distinguished Flying Cross & Bar

Sir Alan Smith, CBE, DFC & Bar, DL (14 March 1917 – 1 March 2013) was a Royal Air Force fighter ace who piloted a Supermarine Spitfire in the Second World War, and a successful businessman.

== Early life ==
Smith was born in South Shields, County Durham. He left Bede College School, Sunderland at 14 after the death of his merchant navy sea captain father (Alfred Smith, Master Mariner and Master of the SS Clearpool) to work in his mother's ironmongery store and then set up his own business.

== RAF career ==
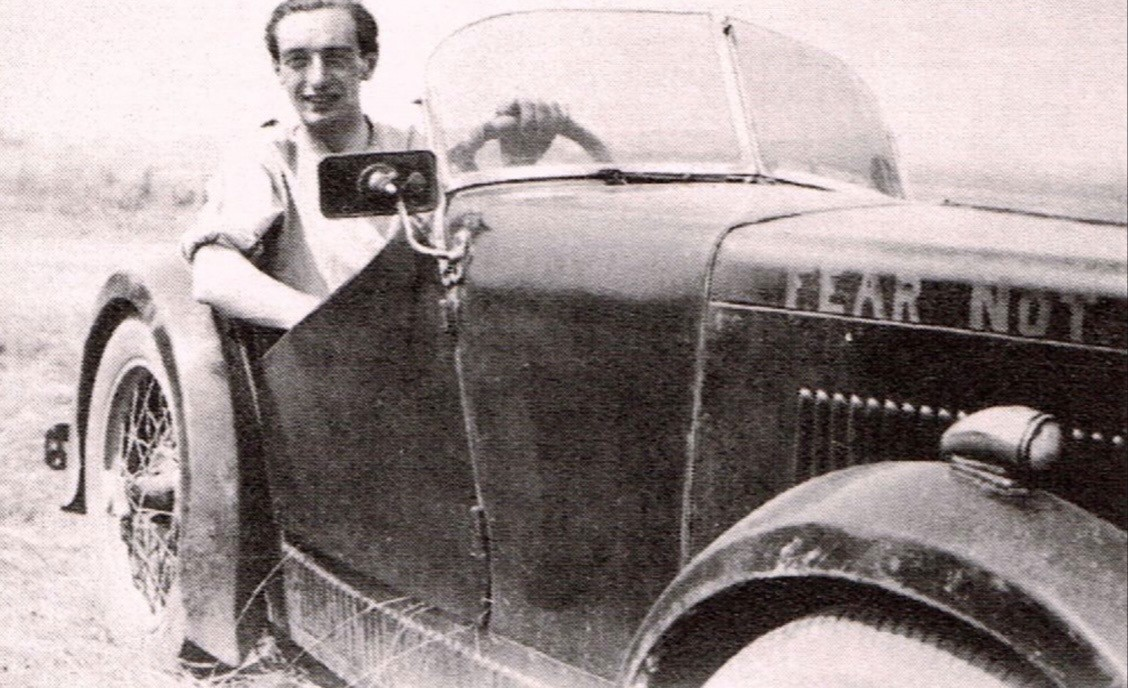
Officers' car at RAF Tangmere

Smith trained as a pilot after joining the RAF Volunteer Reserve and joined No. 610 Squadron RAF. He then joined No. 616 Squadron RAF as a sergeant pilot in January 1941 based at RAF Tangmere. He was under the command of Wing Commander Douglas Bader who selected him as his wingman in which role he was described as "leech-like", and "a perfect number two". Two further well-known individuals made up Bader's section of four aircraft during this period: Johnnie Johnson and Hugh 'Cocky' Dundas. His appointment as wing man followed Douglas Bader's entry into the dispersal hut when he was told "Right you'll do. God help you if you let any Hun get on my tail". The section operated under the callsign 'Dogsbody' which originated from Douglas Bader's initials: "DB". Three of the four (Bader, Dundas and Smith) went on to receive knighthoods and all four survived the war. On 9 August 1941 Smith had a head cold and hence was grounded on medical orders. As he was about to be commissioned he headed to London to be fitted for his new uniform. He was therefore unavailable to fly and protect his commanding officer's tail and Bader was shot down and spent the remainder of the war as a prisoner of war.

Smith then served as an instructor and trained Americans to fly the Spitfire. He joined No. 93 Squadron RAF and took part in Operation Torch flying from Algeria where he shot down four Focke-Wulf Fw 190 fighters and other aircraft.

After service as a flying instructor in Florida he left the RAF in December 1945 as a Flight Lieutenant having clocked up over 1500 flying hours.

== Business career ==
Smith then moved to Scotland, where he became a managing director and then a chief executive in the textile industry, serving as Chairman of Dawson International. He also served as Chairman of Quayle Munro, merchant bank, in Edinburgh.

== Honours and decorations ==
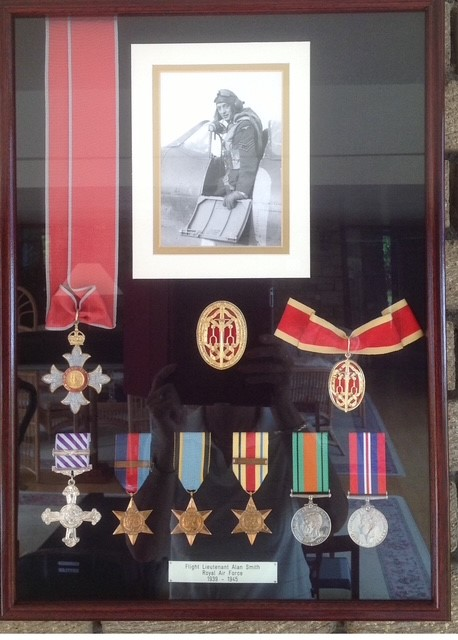
Sir Alan Smith's medals

On 4 November 1941, the then Pilot Officer Smith was awarded the Distinguished Flying Cross in recognition of gallantry displayed in flying operations against the enemy:

Throughout the 44 operational sorties in which, he has participated, this officer has shown the greatest keenness to 'engage the enemy and has destroyed at least four of their aircraft. In combat, he has been of great support to his leader on numerous occasions

— London Gazette

On 16 February 1943, Flight Lieutenant Smith was awarded a Bar to his Distinguished Flying Cross in recognition of gallantry displayed in flying operations against the enemy:

During the campaign in North Africa, Flight Lieutenant Smith has destroyed 4 enemy aircraft. His great skill, and fine example have inspired the formation he leads.

— London Gazette

On 1 January 1976, as chairman of Dawson International, Smith was appointed a Commander of the Order of the British Empire (CBE) in the new year honours. In the 1982 Birthday Honours, he was appointed a Knight Batchelor in recognition of his role as chairman and chief executive of Dawson International.
