= Pensions and Lifetime Savings Association =

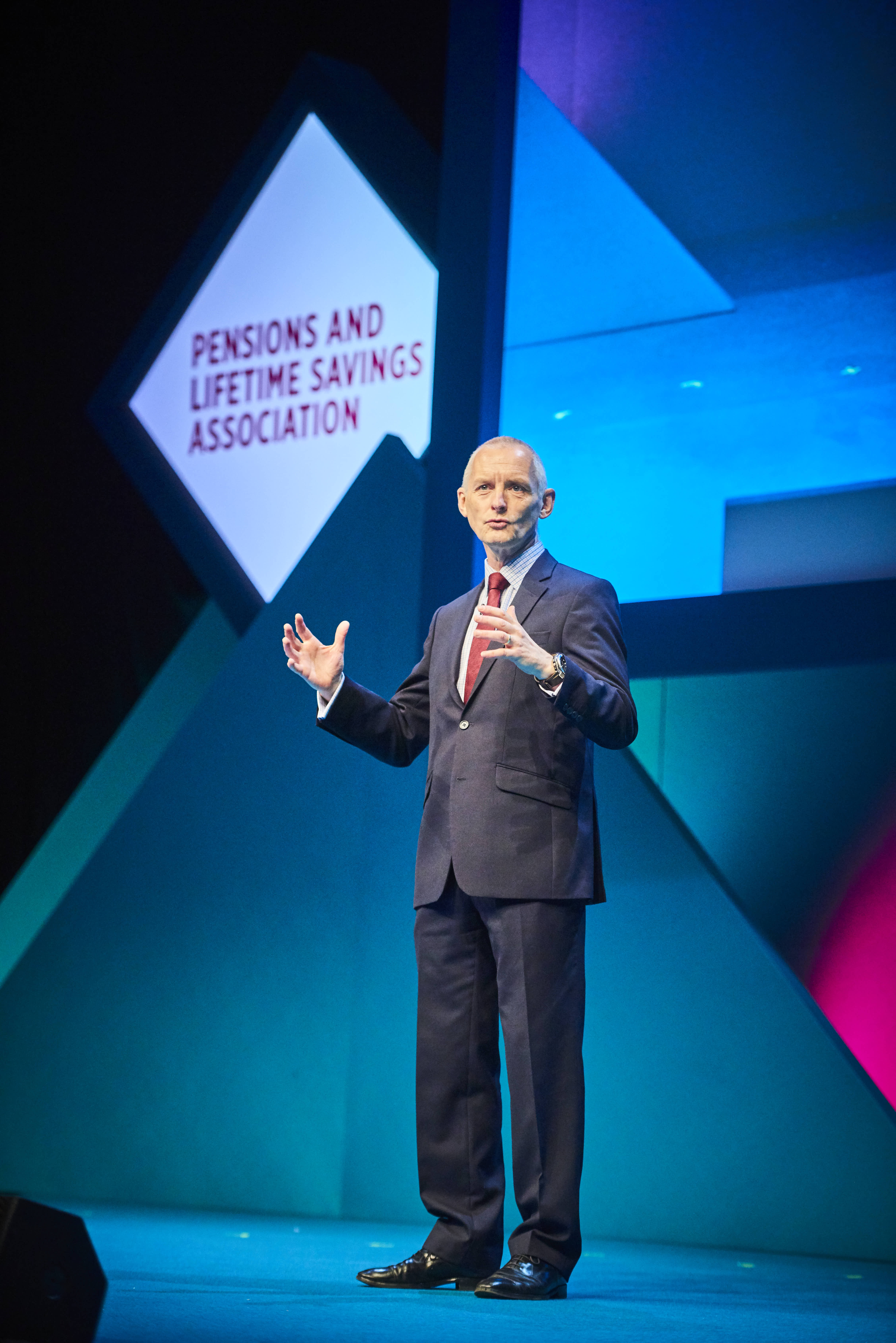
- Abbreviation: PLSA
- Formation: 1923
- Legal status: Non-profit company
- Purpose: Pension funds in the UK
- Location(s): St Dunstan’s Hill; London, EC3; United Kingdom
- Region served: United Kingdom
- Members: Over 1,300 pension schemes and 300 supporting businesses
- Chief Executive: Julian Mund
- Main organ: Board (Chair - Emma Douglas)
- Affiliations: PensionsEurope Pension Quality Mark (PQM) Pensions Infrastructure Platform (PiP)
- Website: PLSA PQM

The Pensions and Lifetime Savings Association (formerly the National Association of Pension Funds) is a trade association for those involved in designing, operating, advising and investing in all aspects of workplace pensions.

The Pensions and Lifetime Savings Association represents 1,300 pension funds which together provide pensions for 22 million people and have more than £1000 billion of assets. Members' pension schemes include defined benefit, defined contribution, group personal pensions and statutory schemes such as those in local government.

The Association's membership also includes 400 businesses that provide services to pension funds. These include investment managers, law firms, actuarial consultancies and administrators.

Describing itself as the voice of its members "with government, Parliament and regulators", it aims to help pension professionals run better pension schemes, and to advocate for regulation and policies that it considers in the interest of its membership and the industry. It also provides events, training and publications, and works to raise standards in the pensions industry.

== Role ==
The association promotes the interests of pension funds by lobbying government and regulators (such as the Pensions Regulator, the Financial Conduct Authority and EU institutions). It undertakes various research projects covering different aspects of pensions including the size and structure of UK defined benefit and defined contribution schemes, trends in longevity and the changing nature of retirement.

Membership of the Association is open to any organisation providing any form of retirement provision for employees and to those providing professional advice and services to pension schemes.

It hosts a number of seminars and conferences throughout the year which aim to keep members up-to-date with developments in the pensions industry. The PLSA also provides various training for members through its training Academy and policy-related ‘teach-in’ events.

== Governance ==
The Association is a not for profit organisation run by the association's Board .

The Chair of the Board is Richard Butcher, Managing Director at PTL, where he acts as a non-executive director to pension and investment related entities and professional trustee as well as managing a team of other people doing the same. He has held a non-executive directorship role at the Association since 2013 and chaired its former Defined Contribution Council.

The Chief Executive of the Association is Julian Mund, who joined the PLSA as Commercial Services Director at the end of September 2013.

The Policy Board, created in October 2018 following a review of the PLSA's governance arrangements, is the Association's main policy-making body. It is made up of 17 appointed members and meets around three times a year to debate key issues.

== Events ==
The PLSA's Annual Conference and Exhibition is held in October and alternates between the ACC Liverpool and Manchester Central, attracting around 1500 attendees.

Speakers come primarily from the UK and European government, the pensions and investment industries and relevant areas of economics and science. Bob Geldof gave the keynote speech at the Annual Conference and Exhibition in Liverpool in 2014 and Andrew Marr appeared in 2018. The government and shadow ministers with pension remits frequently appear.

The annual calendar of events also includes:

- Investment Conference, held at the EICC in Edinburgh in March
- Local Authority Conference, held in the Cotswolds in May
- Trustee Conference, held in London in December.

Speakers at these events have included former UK Prime Minister Tony Blair, BlackRock founder Larry Fink, Al Gore and the Prince of Wales.

== Subsidiaries ==
The Pension Quality Mark (PQM) is a standard awarded to defined contribution pension schemes that meet certain criteria, including governance, communications and contribution levels. Over 200 pension schemes have achieved either PQM or PQM PLUS standard. Over 400,000 employees are actively saving in these arrangements.

The Pensions Infrastructure Platform (PiP) is an infrastructure investment vehicle established by the NAPF, the Pension Protection Fund and a group of large UK pension funds investment to encourage and facilitate UK pension scheme investment into UK infrastructure. In February 2014 PiP launched its first fund, the £600m PPP Equity PIP LP, which is managed by Dalmore Capital Ltd.
