= John Cochrane (pilot) =

British test pilot for the Anglo-French supersonic airliner, Concorde (1930–2006)

John Cochrane (26 July 1930 – 4 November 2006) was a British test pilot for the Anglo-French supersonic airliner, Concorde.

== Education ==
John Cochrane was born in Ayr and educated at Strathallan School, Perthshire. Cochrane initially started an engineering degree before deciding to leave and join the Royal Air Force (RAF). He received a cadetship to the Royal Air Force College at RAF Cranwell in 1949 where he trained as a pilot and was awarded the Phillip Sassoon Memorial Prize for the cadet placed second in the order of merit. At the same time he was also awarded the RUSI prize for the best individual thesis. Cochrane graduated in 1952.

== Early career ==
Upon graduation Cochrane joined the renowned 617 Squadron ("Dambusters") where he flew the English Electric Canberra bomber, Britain's first jet powered bomber. He then served with No. 90 Squadron RAF and No. 214 Squadron RAF with whom he flew the Vickers Valiant, the first of Britain's three V Bombers. Cochrane saw active service with No. 214 Squadron RAF during the Suez Crisis in 1956 when he flew bombing raids on Egyptian airfields from Malta. His talents soon marked him out as a potential test pilot, not only an excellent pilot, he had the ability to write succinct and enlightening reports on any aircraft he flew. As a squadron leader in 1960, he graduated from the Empire Test Pilots' School in Farnborough, after which he was posted to the Aeroplane and Armament Experimental Establishment at Boscombe Down. In September 1962, he resigned his commission with the RAF and joined Vickers-Armstrongs to become an experimental test pilot. At Vickers he was involved with the stall tests on the company's last civil airliner, the VC10.

== Concorde ==
In 1962, discussions between the British Aircraft Corporation (BAC) and Sud Aviation began, regarding the possibility of a supersonic transport aircraft. The final collaboration would be that of the successors, British Aerospace (BAe) and Aérospatiale, respectively. In May 1964, they agreed the preliminary design of the Mach 2 Concorde. Assembly of the British prototype began at Filton in 1966, the same year that John Cochrane was appointed project test pilot. To prepare for the first flight of the British-built Concorde 002, Cochrane flew on numerous high-performance delta wing or deeply swept wing aircraft to explore their flying characteristics. He flew on the Dassault Mirage III interceptor fighter, Dassault Mirage IV nuclear bomber, English Electric Lightning, Handley Page HP.115 and the British Aircraft Corporation BAC221. In 1968, he was appointed deputy chief test pilot of the commercial division of BAC.

On 9 April 1969, John Cochrane flew as co-pilot on the maiden flight of Concorde 002 with Brian Trubshaw as chief test pilot, exactly five weeks after the French sister aircraft first flew. Cochrane would stay with the Concorde test programme for its entirety. Concorde finally acquired its certificate of airworthiness in December 1975 and flew commercially for the first time with British Airways on 21 January 1976. Cochrane piloted Concorde 002 for many of its proving flights and commanded Concorde 101 on its trials. He had specific responsibility for the engine intake control system, which required him to test the aircraft to the limits of its speed, altitude and ability to carry a payload of passengers over the most likely potential routes at Mach 2. He commanded Concorde 101 when it reached its fastest supersonic speed of Mach 2.23 and a height of 68,000 feet. Cochrane also established record sub-three-hour transatlantic crossings in both directions.

Both Cochrane and Trubshaw insisted on many changes as they began testing on Concorde. One of the first problems they encountered was the protective visor on the front window, which, with two narrow slits, left them with a good view of the clouds but limited visibility for landing. They also encountered problems as they flew the Concorde prototype to its maximum speed of Mach 2.2. When they decided to turn off the reheat system, the Rolls-Royce Olympus jet engines went into a cyclic surge condition known as a 'forward firing backfire'. The French had experienced the same problems and the British insisted that the engine controls be changed from an analogue to a digital system. This was one of the main reasons that led to soaring costs and the seven-year delay. On one occasion in 1974, Cochrane was flying Concorde 002 when one of its undercarriage legs would not lock in the down position whilst preparing for landing. He safely made an emergency landing and it led to another vital modification on the aircraft.

== Later career ==
In 1980 having helped to train the pilots he retired from BAe and flew commercially for ten years with Cyprus Airways as a captain. The decision to ground Concorde in 2003 after the fatal Paris crash in 2000, saddened him and he insisted that Concorde could have flown commercially for much longer. On 24 October 2003 he was present on one of the three Concordes that made their final commercial flights to Heathrow Airport. Cochrane acknowledged that flying Concorde was the highlight of his career and claimed that involvement in the project was "perhaps second only to the US Apollo Program".

== Awards ==
- Awarded the Queen's Commendation for Valuable Service in the Air, 1971.
- Awarded the Derry and Richards Memorial Medal for flight test achievement, 1977.

== See also ==
- Brian Trubshaw
