= Robin Buchanan =

American businessman

Robin W. T. Buchanan (born 1952) is a director of companies and an adviser to family offices, private equity firms, businesses and voluntary organisations.

From 2010, Buchanan was a non-executive director of Schroders, the FTSE 100 global asset management company, where he contributed as a member of the Chairman’s, Remuneration, Nomination, Audit & Risk Committees. By 2013, he was a non-executive director at LyondellBasell, the Fortune 500 petrochemical and refinery company, where he served on the Compensation and Nomination & Governance Committees. He chairs the Investment Committee of Access Industries, a family holding company. Buchanan is also a Senior Adviser to Bain & Company and to Coller Capital. In addition, he is a trustee of Trees for Life, the conservation charity dedicated to restoring the Caledonian Forest.

Buchanan was previously chairman of Michael Page International, a recruitment company, from 2011 to 2015. From 2007 he was Dean and President of London Business School, moving to the newly created and part-time role of president after what the Financial Times called "a troubled 18 months". From 2009 he was director of the school's Centre for Corporate Governance.

Before joining London Business School, he spent 25 years at Bain & Company. He joined Bain in 1982, becoming partner in 1986. He was elected the Managing Partner of Bain in the UK in 1990 and appointed the Senior Partner for the UK and South Africa in 1996. He was a member of the management buyout team led by Mitt Romney that acquired Bain in 1991, and was described in 2007 as a senior partner at the London office. From 1990 to 2007, the UK business grew at over 25% per annum. He was a member of the Management Committee, Compensation Committee and chaired the Nominating Committee of the worldwide Board of Directors. He headed both the worldwide Acquisitions & Alliances practice and the UK Organisational Enhancement and Change Management practice.

From 1979 to 1982 Buchanan worked for American Express International Banking Corporation, now part of Standard Chartered. Prior to that, he was employed by Mann Judd Landau (now Deloitte & Touche) and McKinsey & Company.

Buchanan was from 1997 to 2008 a non-executive director of Liberty International, a property company, where he chaired the Remuneration Committee and contributed to the Audit, Nominations and Chairman’s Committees. From 2003 to 2008 he was a non-executive director of Shire, a pharmaceutical company.

He is a published author on strategy, acquisitions, customer loyalty, leadership, board effectiveness and corporate governance, remuneration, family companies and private equity.

Buchanan was awarded an MBA with High Distinction from Harvard Business School, where he was a Baker Scholar from 1977 to 1979, and a member of the Harvard Business School Rugby Club. He is a Fellow of the Institute of Chartered Accountants of England & Wales.
