= Multinational Division Central =

Coordinates: 51°10′35″N 6°19′18″E

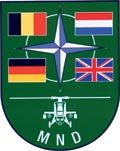
- Formation sign
- Active: 1 Apr 1994 (operationally ready) - 25 Oct 2002 (disbandment parade)
- Country: United Kingdom Germany; Netherlands Belgium
- Branch: Army
- Type: Airmobile division
- Part of: ARRC
- Last headquarters location: JHQ Rheindahlen (Germany)

Commanders
- Last commander: GenMaj Marc Jacqmin (Belgium)

The Multinational Division Central MND (C), was a multi-national division in NATO for Central Europe and had its headquarters at the British JHQ Rheindahlen with its barracks near Mönchengladbach.

The concept for this first genuine multi-national division in NATO with its four participating nations - Belgium, Germany, the United Kingdom and the Netherlands originated during the Cold War. The airmobile MND (C) was to support Northern Army Group Central Europe (NORTHAG) as a reserve formation. The MND (C) achieved operational readiness on 1 April 1994. The divisional staff comprised 50 officers, 54 NCOs and soldiers. The headquarters company initially had 154 soldiers from Germany. Its first commander was Major General Pieter Huysman from the Netherlands.

On the full activation of the division each nation was to make available a parachute or airmobile brigade, combat support units and supply units.

Four brigades from the participating nations were under command:

- the Belgian Para-Commando Brigade (Eversberg)
- the German 31st Airborne Brigade (Oldenburg)
- the British 24th Airmobile Brigade (Colchester), from 1999: the 16 Air Assault Brigade
- the Royal Netherlands Army 11 Luchtmobiele Brigade (Schaarsbergen)

MND-C, with a theoretical strength of 20,000 soldiers had the capability of deploying on worldwide military intervention missions. The Division would be placed under command of its superior formation, Allied Rapid Reaction Corps (ARRC), on request.

It was also possible for the MND(C) to be mobilised for military operations under the Western European Union (WEU) as [art of the Forces Answerable to WEU (FAWEU) . At a WEU Council of Ministers meeting in Rome on 19 May 1993, the four contributing countries confirmed that the division could be made "available for military tasks under WEU auspices."

Because NATO became increasingly focused on other crisis reaction forces (the so-called High Readiness Forces (Land)), the headquarters of MND (C) was disbanded on 25 October 2002. Its last commander was Major General Marc Jacqmin.
