= Peter Yellowlees =

British-born American physician

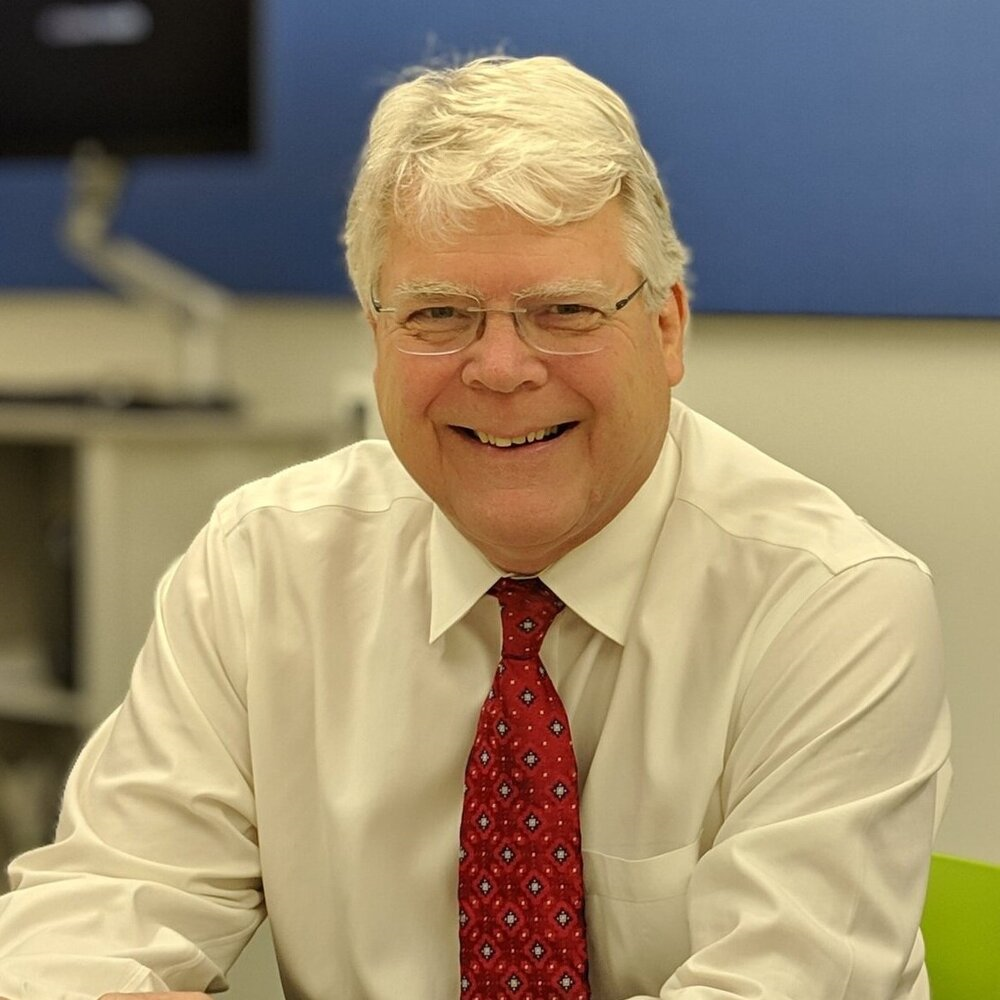
- Occupations: Physician, entrepreneur, researcher, academic, author and administrator
- Spouse: Barb Yellowlees

Academic background
- Education: B.Sc. (1976); MBBS (1979); MD (1990)
- Alma mater: University of London; Flinders University of South Australia

Academic work
- Institutions: Flinders University of South Australia; University of Queensland; University of California, Davis
- Website: www.peteryellowlees.com

Peter Yellowlees is a British-born American physician, researcher, entrepreneur, academic and administrator. He is Distinguished Emeritus Professor of General Psychiatry at University of California, Davis and is the Chief Executive Officer and Founder of Asynchealth Inc. He was the inaugural Chief Wellness Officer at UC Davis and held the Alan Stoudemire Endowed Chair in Psychiatry as the Director of Physician Health Program at UC Davis Psychiatry. He chaired the UCDH Wellbeing Committee.

Yellowlees has conducted research in the areas of psychiatry, telemedicine, health informatics and physician health. Most of his research has been focused on the doctor-patient interface and how technologies can be used to promote high quality care and improve physician well-being. He has written over 250 academic papers and book chapters and 7 books. Yellowlees was the author and presenter of The Medscape Psychiatry Minute, video editorials that were published every month on WebMD/Medscape from 2009–2019.

Yellowlees was President of the American Telemedicine Association in 2017, and was elected as a Fellow of the Australasian College of Health Informatics in 1999, and as a Fellow of the American College of Psychiatrists in 2022. He is a Fellow of the American Telemedicine Association, a Fellow of the Royal College of Psychiatrists, a Fellow of the American Psychiatric Association and a Fellow of the Australian and New Zealand College of Psychiatrists.

== Education ==
Yellowlees received a B.Sc. in 1976 and an MBBS in 1979, both from University of London. He then joined Flinders University of South Australia, where he received a research MD in 1990.

== Career ==
After finishing medical school and earning his MBBS, Yellowlees completed his Psychiatry Boards in the United Kingdom (1984) and Australia (1986). Following residency, he worked at Flinders Medical Center, Adelaide, before three years of rural practice in Broken Hill, New South Wales. He then worked as the Chief Psychiatrist at the South Australian Mental Health Services before joining the University of Queensland's Department of Psychiatry as a Professor in 1995. From 1996 to 2000, he was the Chair of Department of Psychiatry at University of Queensland. In 1999, he was appointed as the founding Director of University of Queensland Center for Online Health, a position he served in until 2004.

In 2004, Yellowlees joined the University of California, Davis as a Professor in the Department of Psychiatry and Behavioral Sciences. He later served as the Interim Vice Provost of Information and Educational Technology from 2005 to 2006. In 2005, he became Director of Academic Information Systems in the School of Medicine at UC Davis and from 2005 to 2014, he served as the Chair and Director of Health Informatics Program at UC Davis.

Yellowlees was appointed as the Vice Chair for Faculty Development of the Department of Psychiatry at UC Davis in 2013. In 2017, he became the Director of UCD Physician Health Program in the Department of Psychiatry and in 2018 was appointed to be the Chief Wellness Officer of UCD Health.

Yellowlees has been actively involved with the American Telemedicine Association for the greater part of his career. He served on the Board from 2009 to 2018, including as President of the Association in 2017. Yellowlees has served on the Editorial Boards of the Journal of Telemedicine and eHealth (2000 – current), and the Journal of Telemedicine and Telecare (1996 – current). From 2008 to 2009, he was the Deputy Editor of Medscape Journal of Medicine.

In 2009, Yellowlees was appointed as chair of the UCDHS Well Being Committee. In this role he is responsible for monitoring faculty with substance abuse or psychiatric problems that may affect patient safety. He has developed and implemented a screening and preventative healthcare program for faculty and residents and set up a resource website containing educational programs.

== Research and work ==
=== Psychiatric aspects of respiratory diseases ===
Yellowlees' early research derived from his research doctorate at Flinders University where he published about 10 papers in association with a group of thoracic medicine colleagues. These papers examined the causes of the overlap of anxiety and asthma and chronic obstructive pulmonary disease, described levels of psychiatric morbidity, and examined reasons for death in asthmatics. His papers, Psychological defenses and coping styles in patients following a life-threatening attack of asthma published in 1989 and Psychobiological aspects of asthma and the consequent research implications published in 1990 are both widely cited.

=== Psychosomatic medicine ===
Yellowlees followed up his initial interest in respiratory disease with a number of papers on numerous medical/psychiatry topics derived from his clinical work in consultation liaison environments. These included papers on alcohol and drug abuse, eating disorders, HIV, and pregnancy. He has published about 20 papers in this area through his career.

=== Rural mental health services ===
In 1989, Yellowlees moved to rural Australia and started a series of studies on rural mental health, using increasing methodologies from health services research, as well as studies of patients who are heavy users of psychiatric services. This led to a number of papers and presentations in these areas. He conducted research and wrote on topics of heavy utilization of inpatient and outpatient services in a public mental health service, rural mental health and measurement of a case manager's workload burden.

=== Telemedicine and telepsychiatry ===
Yellowlees' interest in rural mental health services led him to start implementing telemedicine systems, and then on to research in telemedicine, health informatics and telepsychiatry. He has published over 80 papers in these two areas. He was the lead author on the telemental health guidelines published by the American Telemedicine Association in 2009.

=== Asynchronous telepsychiatry and innovative health informatics approaches ===
In the late 2000s, Yellowlees and his colleagues developed a novel clinical process called Asynchronous Telepsychiatry. With funding from six grants commencing in 2007, Yellowlees further developed and validated the process of Asynchronous Telepsychiatry. He and his team have shown the feasibility and the reliability of this approach to psychiatric assessment through multiple studies. In 2016, he received a $2 million grant from Agency for Healthcare Research and Quality for research to validate the online automated language interpretation tool that he and his team have developed. He has published ten papers focused on or covering this topic.

Yellowlees has also been the primary investigator on a number of other approaches to mental health care, especially in the mobile arena, and in 2018 published with his colleague, Jay Shore, a textbook on telepsychiatry and mental health technologies.

=== Physician health and well-being ===
Commencing in 2015 Yellowlees led a number of research studies on physician health, mainly focused on how to engage physicians in mental health treatment. He wrote two textbooks on physician suicide (2019) and physician wellbeing (2020) published by American Psychiatric Association Publishing that were used as core texts on "train the trainer" educational programs on clinician health that he developed starting in 2019.

== Selected awards and honors ==
- 1988 – Charlotte Brown Award, Royal Free Hospital London.
- 1989 – Cunning Award, Royal Free Hospital London.
- 1989 – Organon Junior Research Award
- 1997 – THEMHS Silver Medal Award to Valley Integrated Mental Health Service
- 1999 – Schizophrenia Fellowship of South East Queensland
- 1999 – International Asia Pacific Information Communications Technology Award to the Queensland Telemedicine Network
- 2006 – American Telemedicine Association President’s Award for the Advancement of Telemedicine
- 2009 – Stangler innovator of the year, American Association for Technology in Psychiatry
- 2017 – Chief of Staff Award, UC Davis. For Wellbeing Committee work.
- 2018 – Fellow American Telemedicine Association
- 2022 - Fellow American College of Psychiatrists

== Publications ==
=== Books ===
- Field Testing of Selected Measures of Consumer Outcomes in Mental Health. Measuring Consumer Outcomes in Mental Health (1997)
- Your Guide to E-Health: Third Millennium Medicine on the Internet (2001)
- Your Health in the Information Age: How You and Your Doctor Can Use the Internet to Work Together (2008)
- Mental Health Informatics (2014)
- Telepsychiatry and Health Technologies: A Guide for Mental Health Professionals (2018)
- Physician Suicide: Cases and Commentaries (2019)
- Physician Wellbeing: Cases and Solutions (2020)

=== Selected articles ===
- Yellowlees, P. M., Alpers, J. H., Bowden, J. J., Bryant, G. D., & Ruffin, R. E. (1987). Psychiatric morbidity in patients with chronic airflow obstruction. Medical Journal of Australia, 146(6), 305–307.
- Yellowlees, P. M., & Ruffin, R. (1989). Psychological Defenses and Coping Styles in Patients Following a Life-Threatening Attack of Asthma. Chest, 95(6), 1298–1303.
- Kent, S., & Yellowlees, P. (1994). Psychiatric and Social Reasons for Frequent Rehospitalization. Psychiatric Services, 45(4), 347–350.
- Campbell, D. A., Yellowlees, P. M., Mclennan, G., Coates, J. R., Frith, P. A., Gluyas, P. A., Ruffin, R. E., & Yellowlees, P. (1995). Psychiatric and medical features of near fatal asthma. Thorax, 50(3), 254–259.
- Yellowlees, P. M. (2005). Successfully developing a telemedicine system. Journal of Telemedicine and Telecare, 11(7), 331–335.
- Yellowlees P, Hilty D, Marks S, Neufeld J, Bourgeois J. A retrospective analysis of a child and adolescent eMental Health program. Journal of the American Academy of Child and Adolescent Psychiatry. 2008 Jan;47(1):103-7.
- Yellowlees P, Odor A, Parish M, Iosif A, Haught K, Hilty D. A Feasibility Study of the Use of Asynchronous Telepsychiatry for Psychiatric Consultations. Psychiatric Services. 2010 August;61(8):838-840.
- Yellowlees P, Shore J, Roberts L. Practice Guidelines for Videoconferencing-Based Telemental Health – October 2009. Telemedicine and e-Health. 2010 December;16(10):1074-1089.
- Yellowlees PM, Campbell MD, Rose JS, Burke Parish M, Ferrer D, Scher LM, Skipper GE, DuPont RL. Psychiatrists With Substance Use Disorders: Positive Treatment Outcomes From Physician Health Programs. Psychiatric Serv. 2014 Dec 1;65(12):1492-5
- Bashshur RL, Shannon GW, Bashshur N, Yellowlees PM. The Empirical Evidence for Telemedicine Interventions in Mental Disorders. Telemed J E Health. 2016 Feb; 22(2):87-113
- Yellowlees P, Burke Parish M, González Á, Chan S, Hilty D, Iosif AM, McCarron R, Odor A, Scher L, Sciolla A, Shore J, Xiong G. Asynchronous Telepsychiatry: A Component of Stepped Integrated Care. Telemed J E Health. 2017 Oct 12
- Nakagawa K, Kvedar J, Yellowlees P. Retail Outlets Using Telehealth Pose Significant Policy Questions For Health Care. Health Affairs. 2018 Dec;37(12):2069-2075
- Yellowlees P, Coate L, Misquitta R, Wetzel AE, Parish MB. The Association Between Adverse Childhood Experiences and Burnout in a Regional Sample of Physicians. Acad Psychiatry. 2021 Apr;45(2):159-163.
