= Michael Yellowlees =

Scottish field hockey player

Personal information
- Born: 1959 (age 66–67)

Sport
- Sport: Field hockey
National team
Years	Team	Caps	Goals
–	Scotland		-

Michael Yellowlees (born 1959) is a former Scottish field hockey player who played for the Scotland national outdoor and indoor teams during the 1980s and early 1990s. He played his club hockey for Edinburgh Civil Service and Murray International Metals.

In 1983 he scored the only goal for the Scotland outdoor team that beat Spain 1–0 in Barcelona. Scotland's first victory against Spain in international competition.

Yellowlees was also a member of the Scotland outdoor squad that beat Holland for the first time in 1986. Scotland won the match 2–1 with a goal in the last few minutes at Largs. Holland were the reigning European champions at the time.

Yellowlees graduated from the University of Edinburgh in history and law. In 2003 he published his first book. He is a practising solicitor in Edinburgh.

- Michael J Yellowlees (2003). 'So Strange a Monster As a Jesuiste': The Society of Jesus in Sixteenth-Century Scotland. House of Lochar. ISBN 1899863885.
