= Renewi =

Waste management company

Renewi plc
- Type: Public
- Traded as: LSE: RWI; Euronext: RWI
- Industry: Waste management
- Founded: 1880; 146 years ago
- Founders: Guy Shanks; Andrew McEwan
- Headquarters: Dunedin House, Mount Farm, Auckland Park, Milton Keynes, MK1 1BU, UK
- Key people: Ben Verwaayen (Group Chairman); Otto de Bont (CEO)
- Revenue: ▼€1,689.2 million (2024)
- Operating income: ▼€105.5 million (2024)
- Net income: ▼€(30.9) million (2024)
- Owner: Macquarie European Infrastructure Fund 7 and BCI UK IRR
- Parent: Macquarie Group; BCI
- Website: www.renewiplc.com

Renewi plc is a leading European waste management company operating primarily in the Benelux region. It was listed on the London Stock Exchange (LSE) and Euronext Amsterdam until it was acquired by a consortium formed by affiliates of the Macquarie Group and BCI in June 2025.

== History ==
Renewi was founded by Guy Shanks and Andrew McEwan in 1880 as a construction company operating primarily in the West of Scotland under the name of Shanks & McEwan. In 1988, when it was first listed on the LSE, it acquired London Brick Landfill and with it an enormous landfill capacity north of London.

In the mid-1990s, the firm sold its remaining construction interests to concentrate solely on waste management. In 1998, a year before changing its name to Shanks Group, it acquired four waste management companies in Belgium.

In March 2000, Shanks bought Waste Management Nederland B.V. in the Netherlands. In July 2004, two years before buying Smink Beheer B.V. in the Netherlands for €62m, it sold its UK landfill and landfill gas power assets to Terra Firma Capital Partners.

In 2017, after agreeing to acquire it for €432 million and merging with the Dutch recycling group Van Gansewinkel, it was renamed Renewi plc. In 2019, as part of a strategy to focus the business on its core operations and regions, it sold its Canadian operations to Convent Capital and its Reym-branded industrial cleaning business to Remondis.

In February 2025, a consortium of Macquarie European Infrastructure Fund 7 (managed by Macquarie Group) and BCI UK IRR (managed by British Columbia Investment Management Corporation) made an offer worth £707 million to acquire the company. On 6 June, two days after the court approved the proposal, allowing the deal to be finalized, it was announced that the acquisition had been completed.

== Operations ==
The company's current operations are concentrated within the following three countries:

- UK: activities include long term local authority municipal solid waste (MSW) contracts, the anaerobic digestion of food waste, and the production of lower-carbon alternatives to fossil fuels.
- The Netherlands: activities include collections, sorting and processing, re-use and recycling, soil cleaning, composting, landfill, refuse-derived fuel production and industrial cleaning.
- Belgium: activities include collections, recycling, soil cleaning, refuse-derived fuel production, waste treatment and landfill in Flanders, Wallonia, and Brussels.
