= List of surviving Avro Vulcans =

The Avro Vulcan is a British jet-engine strategic bomber operated by the Royal Air Force from 1956 until 1984. Of the 134 production Vulcans built, 19 survive today. None are airworthy, although three (XH558, XL426 and XM655) are in taxiable condition. All but four survivors are located in the United Kingdom. Of the four Vulcans deployed in Operation Black Buck during the Falklands War – XM597, XM598, XM607 and XM612 – all survive today.

== Surviving aircraft ==
All locations are in the United Kingdom, unless otherwise stated.

Serial	Geographic location	Institutional location	History	Photo
XH558	Doncaster, South Yorkshire	Robin Hood Airport	The last airworthy Vulcan (XH558) was restored to flying condition by the Vulcan to the Sky Trust. The first post-restoration flight, which lasted 34 minutes, took place on 18 October 2007. After performing displays every season from 2008 until 2015 inclusive, XH558 last flew on 28 October 2015. This was due to the withdrawal of support from the "technical authorities" without whom the aircraft is prohibited from flying, under Civil Aviation Authority (CAA) regulations. The aircraft structure and systems are 10% beyond the flying hours of any other Vulcan, meaning identifying signs of fatigue and stress failure were becoming more difficult.	
XJ823	Carlisle Lake District Airport	Solway Aviation Museum	The 22nd B.2, later converted for the MMR role. Completed 20 April 1961, delivered to 27 Squadron a day later. Latterly with 50 Squadron and then Station Flight, Waddington. It was sold on 21 January 1983 to Tom Stoddard and David Hutchinson of the Solway Aviation Society, which at the time had only one other aircraft, a Meteor jet. Last flight was its arrival into Carlisle Airport in January 1983. Now stored in the open air, as part of the seasonal museum.	
XJ824	Duxford, Cambridgeshire	Imperial War Museum Duxford	Completed 11 May 1961, delivered to 27 Squadron five days later. Latterly with 101 Squadron. Flew into Duxford on 13 March 1982. Displayed inside Hangar 1, then outside while it was redeveloped as Airspace, moving back inside on completion.	
XL318	Colindale, London	Royal Air Force Museum London	The first B.2 delivered to 617 Squadron, The Dam Busters, based at RAF Scampton, on 1 September 1961. Performed its last flight (and last of the 617 as a Vulcan unit) on 11 December 1981, filmed for Yorkshire Television's 617-The Last Days of a Vulcan Squadron. Withdrawn and allocated to the RAF Museum on 4 January 1982, delivered by road from Scampton to Hendon in sections, being reassembled in the Bomber Command Museum (now Bomber Hall) by June 1982.	
XL319	Sunderland, Tyne and Wear	North East Land, Sea and Air Museums	The second B.2 delivered to 617 Squadron based at RAF Scampton, on 20 October 1961. Delivered from RAF Waddington to Sunderland Airport (the former RAF Usworth) on 21 January 1983, the largest aircraft ever to land on the site, performing a small display. Displayed outside as part of the adjacent museum's collection. After the airport was closed on 31 May 1984 (the runway being built over for the Nissan car factory), it was moved with the rest of the museum's collection to an adjacent site, still displayed in the open air, with cockpit tours on certain days.	
XL360	Baginton, Warwickshire	Midland Air Museum	Completed 28 February 1962, delivered to 617 squadron on 2 March. Latterly with 101 Squadron. it was sold to the MAM on 26 January 1983. Delivered to the MAM's site on the north side of Coventry Airport on 4 February, then moved with the rest of their collection a short distance away by 1990, where it is on display in the open air. Cockpit opened daily to visitors. Named City of Coventry in preservation, in recognition of the city's funding the aircraft's purchase.	
XL361	Goose Bay, Newfoundland and Labrador, Canada	CFB Goose Bay	Completed 14 March 1962, being delivered to 617 Squadron the next day. Latterly with 9 Squadron, due to a fire in the fuselage during a trans-Atlantic flight from Woodford to Offutt AFB in Nebraska, XL361 had to make an emergency landing at CFB Goose Bay on 13 November 1981, site of an RAF unit and used regularly as a Vulcan exercise base. With the fleet being retired, it was not repaired, instead being positioned as the RAF unit's gate guardian. At the request of the mayor of the adjacent town of Happy Valley, the RAF gifted it to the community on 14 June 1982, on condition it was displayed within the locality in a dignified manner in RAF colours, with any future changes in its status to be agreed with the British government. Presented to the Labrador Heritage Society Museum in 1983 but remaining at the airbase, which doubles as a civilian airport, it is still displayed in the open air.	
XL426	Southend-on-Sea, Essex	Southend Airport	XL426 (G-VJET) is preserved in taxiable condition at Southend Airport, England.	
XM573	Ashland, Nebraska, United States	Strategic Air Command & Aerospace Museum	The 101st Vulcan produced, delivered in March 1963. Donated by the RAF to the museum adjacent to Offutt Air Force Base, Bellevue, Nebraska, in 1982 as a token of the links between the RAF and the US Strategic Air Command, based at Offutt. Its last flight was a display at Offutt during its handover, as part of the closing ceremony of the RAF detachment at the base, which also featured three other Vulcans, plus flypasts by a USAF trio of the B-52, KC-135 and FB-111, the types flown against by Vulcans in RAF-SAC bombing competitions. Moved to the museum just outside the base perimeter the next day, it was displayed outside until the relocation of the museum to Ashland, Nebraska in 1998, moving indoors. Moved outside in 2015 due to lack of space. As of August 2026, XM573 is back inside and located in the Durham Restoration Hangar, awaiting new paint.	
XM575	Castle Donington, Leicestershire	East Midlands Aeropark	Delivered to 617 squadron in May 1963. Took part in the Falklands War victory flypast over London on 28 October 1982. Last flight was its delivery to East Midlands Airport in January 1983, being given the civilian registration G-BLMC. Displayed outside in the Aeropark museum, a volunteer museum run on behalf of the airport, on its boundary. Preparations were made in 1983 to fly it to a planned museum at Bruntingthorpe Aerodrome recently purchased by the Walton family (eventual owners of XH558 from 1993), although the move never took place as EMA society's funds ran out before it could be made airworthy. Moved once, when the aeropark was moved from one side of the airport to the other. Three of four engines were periodically run until the move to the new location where noise restrictions are in place.	
XM594	Newark-on-Trent, Nottinghamshire	Newark Air Museum	The 58th production Vulcan B2 built, completed on 9 July 1963 and delivered to 27 Squadron ten days later. A 1982 permission for a Vulcan to be sold to the volunteer-run NAM was initially delayed by the Falklands War, and then refused because their runway at the former RAF Winthorpe, now Winthorpe Showground, was deemed unsafe to land a Vulcan. It had never received such a heavy aircraft, or any kind of jet. The decision was reversed after remedial works, on the basis that one Vulcan needed to be retained in the local area (to Waddington). Latterly with 44 Squadron, it became the first Vulcan earmarked for preservation to be paid for, bought by Stuart Stephenson on 19 January 1983, and the only one to be delivered to a non-licensed UK airfield. Its last flight was its delivery from Waddington on 7 February 1983, complete with a display cut short by an arriving blizzard. Displayed outside and regularly powered up until the 2000s, when Health & Safety rules prohibited further use. Sold to the Lincolnshire Lancaster Association (its chairman being the original purchaser) in early 2004, and loaned back to the NAM. Cockpit tours by appointment.	
XM597	East Fortune, East Lothian	National Museum of Flight	Completed on 26 August 1963, it was delivered to 12 Squadron the next day. Along with XM607, one of only two Vulcans to have dropped bombs on an enemy target, both during Black Buck missions. XM597 set the record for the longest bombing raid in Black Buck 5, and causing an international incident when it had to divert to Brazil in Black Buck 6, both feats commemorated with two mission markings and a Brazilian flag painted on the nose. Latterly with 50 Squadron. it was delivered to the museum on 12 April 1984. Displayed outside Hangar 1.	
XM598	Cosford, Shropshire	Royal Air Force Museum Cosford	Completed on 30 August 1963, it was delivered to 12 Squadron at RAF Coningsby on 4 September. Was the originally designated bombing aircraft for Black Buck 1, but which had to turn back minutes into the flight. Withdrawn with disbandment of 44 Squadron, the last bomber unit, on 21 December 1982. Performed its last flight on 20 January 1983, being delivered to Aerospace Museum Cosford, incorporating a final display over the museum. Displayed outside until relocation into the new National Cold War Exhibition building in May 2006, opening 8 February 2007.	
XM603	Woodford, Greater Manchester	Woodford Aerodrome	Completed 29 November 1963, it was delivered to 9 Squadron on 4 December. Latterly with 44 Squadron, it was the test-bed aircraft for the K2 tanker conversions. later being sold to British Aerospace for preservation, being delivered to Woodford on 12 March 1983. Some parts removed for support of XH558, XM655 and XL426. It is now owned by Harrow Estates that purchased the airfield from Avro Heritage Ltd. The Vulcan has now been restored by 47 members of the Avro Heritage museum, being unveiled on 25 October 2016. It is repainted in its anti-flash white livery with black radome and tail.	
XM605	Atwater, California, United States	Castle Air Museum	Completed on 17 December 1963, it was delivered to 9 Squadron on 30 December. Latterly with 50 Squadron. it was donated to the United States Air Force in 1981, being delivered to Castle AFB on 2 September and formally handed over six days later.	
XM606	Bossier City, Louisiana, United States	Barksdale Global Power Museum	Completed on 18 December 1963, it was delivered to 12 Squadron on the 30 December. Latterly with 9 Squadron. It was donated to the United States Air Force, being delivered to Barksdale AFB on 7 June 1982 and formally handed over on 14 June 1983.	
XM607	Waddington, Lincolnshire	RAF Waddington	Completed on 30 December 1963, it was delivered to 35 Squadron on New Year's Day 1964. XM607 was the bombing aircraft in Operation Black Buck, raids one, two and seven. Latterly with 44 Squadron, it was withdrawn on 17 December 1982 and became a static exhibit alongside the Waddington runway.	
XM612	Horsham St Faith, Norfolk	City of Norwich Aviation Museum	Completed on 28 February 1964 by A.V. Roe Co. at Woodford, Manchester, she was delivered to 9 Squadron on 3 March 1964. During the Falklands conflict of 1982, she was one of 5 airframes selected to reposition to Ascension Island to bomb the runway at Port Stanley. She was due to be the lead Vulcan on the 3rd Black Buck raid on 13 May 1982, however the mission was cancelled due to strong headwinds. After her return to RAF Waddington in December 1982, she was decommissioned and was sold to the City of Norwich Aviation Museum for the total sum of £5026 on 19 January 1983, being delivered on 30 January.	
XM655	Wellesbourne, Warwickshire	Wellesbourne Mountford Airfield	XM655 (G-VULC) was the antepenultimate Vulcan to be built, and is the youngest surviving example, preserved in taxiable condition at Wellesbourne Mountford Airfield by the 655 Maintenance & Preservation Society. XM655 initially flew with 9 Squadron, and was also operated by Nos. 44, 50 and 101 Squadrons. In 1984, XM655 was sold off to Roy Jacobsen who intended to keep her airworthy, but the costs proved prohibitive and also the runway was too short for it to take off, and XM655 was left to deteriorate. Title of XM655 then passed onto John Littler, owner of Wellesbourne Mountford Airfield, who intended to get her to a taxiable condition, but not airworthy. As well as MaPS maintaining it, the 150 City of Oxford Air Cadets helps to maintain it. After restoration work, XM655 made her first public taxi run on 16 February 1997, with another two runs later that year. Since then, XM655 has made more or less annual public taxi runs, usually in June, as part of the Wellesbourne Wings and Wheels show. At various of these events, the display of XM655 has been accompanied by flypasts by the BBMF, the Red Arrows and Vulcan XH558. XM655 was also used by the crews of XH558 as required for currency and ground training.	
