= Avro Vulcan XH558 =

Last formerly airworthy Avro Vulcan jet bomber

Avro Vulcan XH558 Spirit of Great Britain
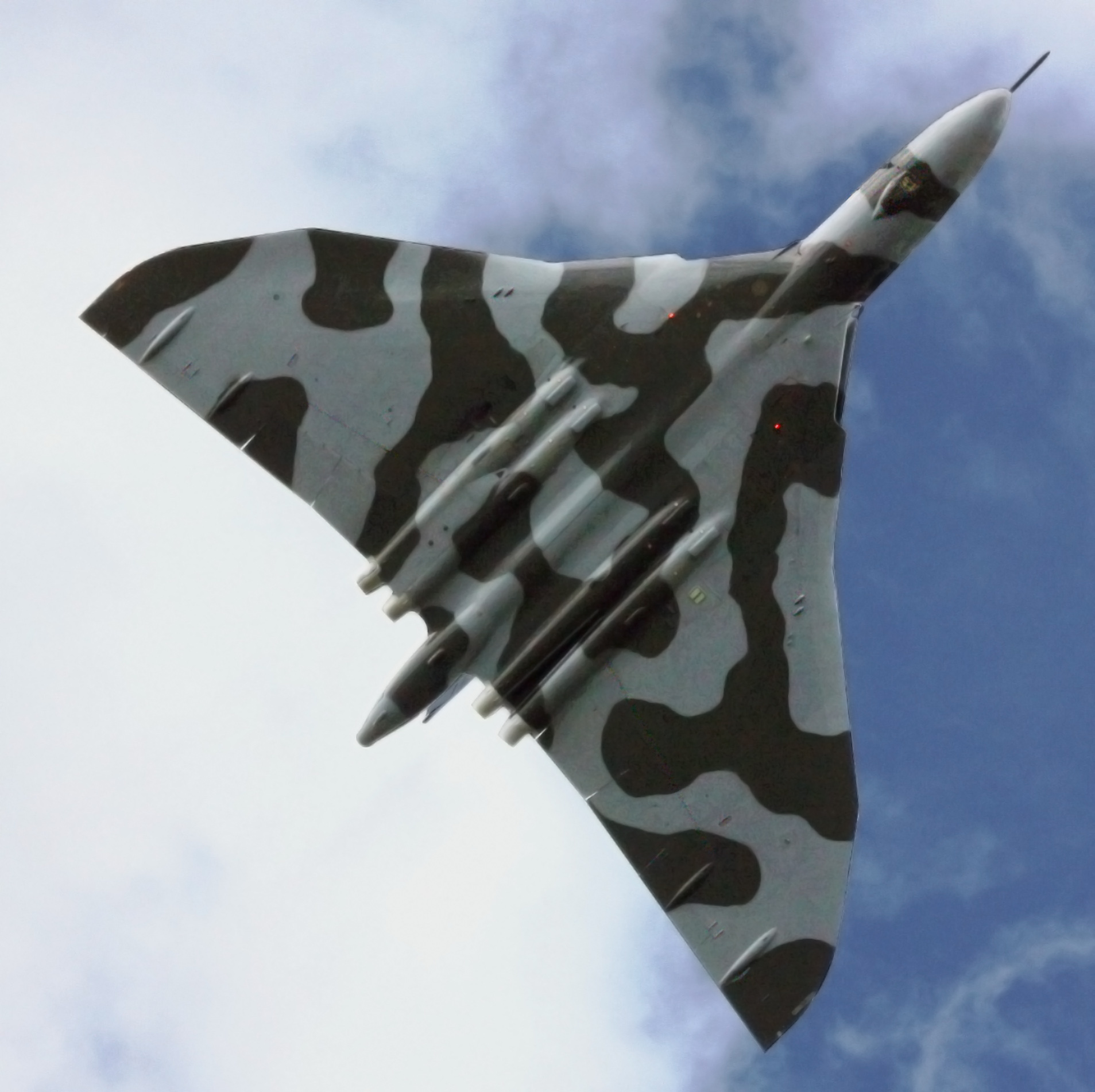
- XH558 (underside) during the 2009 Cosford Airshow

General information
- Other name: Spirit of Great Britain (2010–present)
- Type: Avro Vulcan B2
- Manufacturer: Avro
- Owners: Royal Air Force (1960–1993); C Walton Ltd (1993–2005); Vulcan To The Sky Trust (2005–present)
- Construction number: Set 12
- Registration: G-VLCN
- Serial: XH558
- Total hours: 7,658 (31 December 2014)

History
- First flight: 25 May 1960
- In service: Royal Air Force (1960–1993) -B2 bomber (1960–1973) -SR2 Maritime Radar Reconnaissance (1973–1982) -K2 tanker (1982–1984) -Vulcan Display Flight (1985–1992); Civilian display flights (2008–2015)
- Last flight: 28 October 2015
- Preserved at: Doncaster Sheffield Airport
- Fate: Preserved in taxiable condition

Avro Vulcan XH558 (military serial XH558, civil aircraft registration G-VLCN) Spirit of Great Britain was the last remaining airworthy example of the 134 Avro Vulcan jet-powered delta winged strategic nuclear bomber aircraft operated by the Royal Air Force during the Cold War. It was the last Vulcan in military service, and the last to fly at all after 1986. It last flew on 28 October 2015.

Vulcan XH558 first flew in 1960, and was one of the few examples converted for a maritime reconnaissance role in 1973, and then again as an air-to-air refuelling tanker in 1982. After withdrawal in 1984 it continued with the RAF's Vulcan Display Flight, performing until 1992. In 1993 it was sold to C Walton Ltd who used it for ground-based displays at their Bruntingthorpe Aerodrome in Leicestershire, until 1999. Through a combination of public donations and lottery funding, it was restored to airworthy condition by the Vulcan To The Sky Trust, who returned it to flight on 18 October 2007. The donations required to reach that point totalled £6.5 million.

It recommenced its display career in 2008, funded by continuing donations to assist the £2 million annual running costs. In the summers from 2008 to 2010 it was based at RAF Brize Norton, Oxfordshire, moving its winter base to RAF Lyneham, Wiltshire at the end of 2009. From 2011 it moved to a new year-round base at the commercial Doncaster Sheffield Airport. The prospect of grounding and sale due to lack of funds was regularly averted, and XH558 flew long enough for fundamental engineering life-expectancy issues to become the main threat to continued operation. After being overcome once to gain an extra two years of flight, on 15 May 2015 it was confirmed that 2015 would be XH558's last flying season, due to the third-party companies responsible for maintaining it withdrawing their support. Since its last flight, XH558 is now kept in taxiable condition, in common with two of the other surviving Vulcans, XL426 and XM655.

== History ==
=== Royal Air Force ===
A total of 136 Vulcans were produced at Woodford Aerodrome between 1956 and 1965, with the first entering operational service on 20 May 1957. XH558 was the first of the upgraded B2 version to enter service with the RAF, making its maiden flight from Woodford on 25 May 1960, and being delivered to No. 230 Operational Conversion Unit at RAF Waddington, Lincolnshire, on 1 July 1960. The OCU was the unit which prepared pilots familiar with other aircraft to fly the Vulcan. Almost immediately 230 OCU transferred to RAF Finningley, South Yorkshire. In 1968, XH558 transferred back to Waddington, where it saw operational service with units of the Waddington Wing (44, 50 and 101 Squadrons).

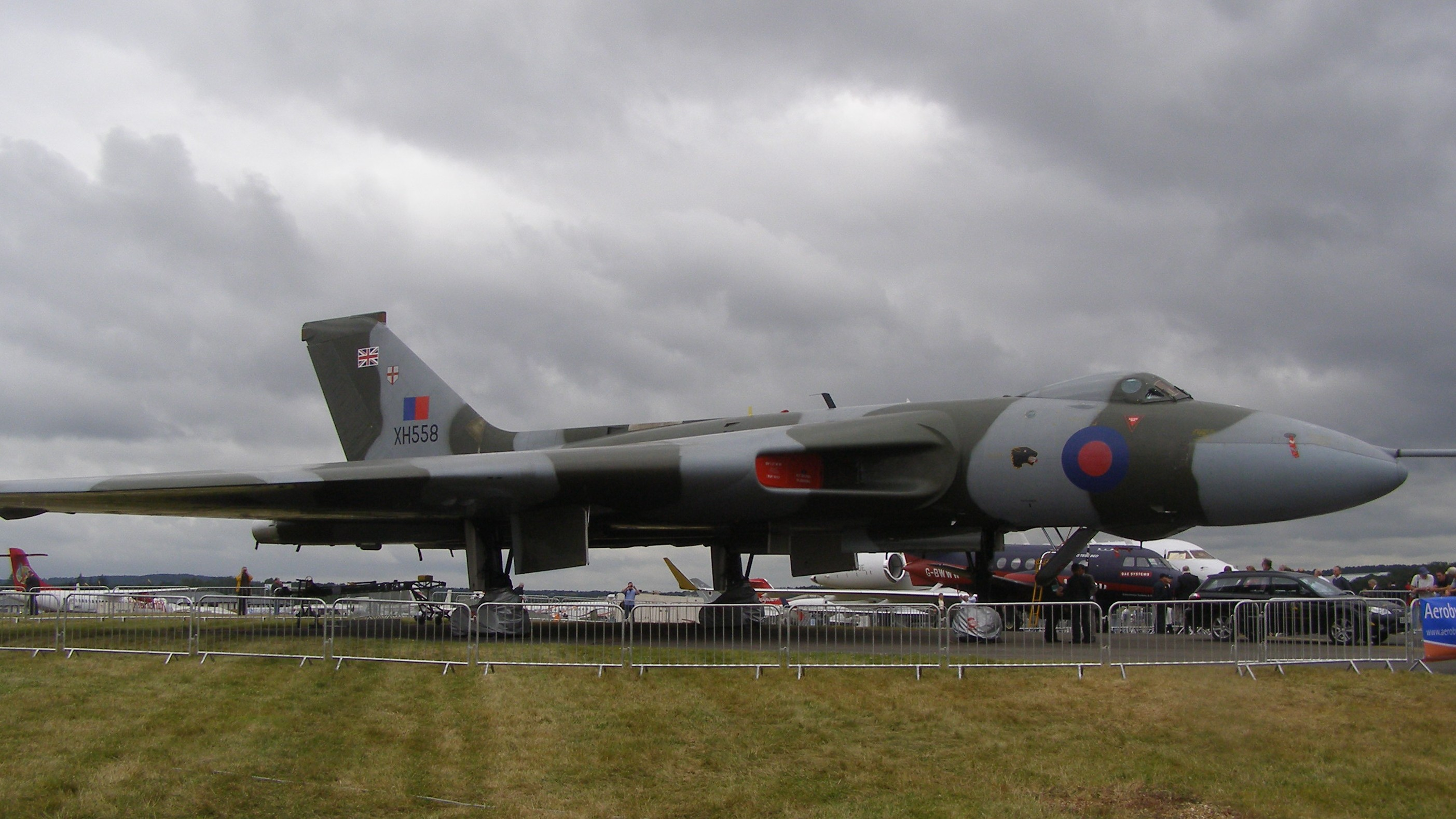
Farnborough Airshow 2008

In August 1973, XH558 was one of nine Vulcans converted to a SR2 Maritime Radar Reconnaissance configuration, for use by No. 27 Squadron. By 1979 it had been decided the Vulcan was redundant, with the first being sent for scrap in December 1980. The last operational bomber squadron disbanded on 27 December 1982. In 1982 XH558 was one of the six Vulcans converted to the K2 tanker variant, a stopgap measure to mitigate temporary shortages in the RAF tanker fleet due to some being life-expired in Falklands War operations, and newer replacement types not yet being ready. Sent to Woodford for conversion at the end of June, it passed back into service with 50 Squadron at Waddington on 12 October. The last Vulcans in service were the six tankers and a few other standard aircraft as trainers, all with 50 Squadron, which disbanded on 31 March 1984. XH558 was finally withdrawn from service on 17 September 1984.

XH558 was subsequently selected for display duties with the RAF's Vulcan Display Flight at Waddington. The VDF had been formed in 1984 and was already using XL426 (the aircraft donated to Southend in 1986). For display duties, XH558 was returned to B2 configuration in 1985, and made its debut at Bournemouth in May 1985. It served in the VDF for seven years, making its final flight at Cranfield on 20 September 1992.

It was the last Vulcan in service, largely due to the fact that it had seen little service as a low-level bomber and had spent considerable time grounded due to an accident when taking off for a northbound maritime sortie from RAF Scampton, on 6 November 1975. On takeoff, the No. 3 engine disintegrated after ingesting a seagull, resulting in a very large hole being blown right through her starboard wing. Subsequent major repairs grounded XH558 for many years, with the result that XH558, despite being the earliest Mk.2 to enter RAF service, had actually flown considerably fewer hours than most of her stablemates.

Earlier the aircraft had appeared in the 1961 Central Office of Information (COI) film No Claim Bonus which was also later used as a Trade test colour film on BBC 2.

=== Post-RAF ===
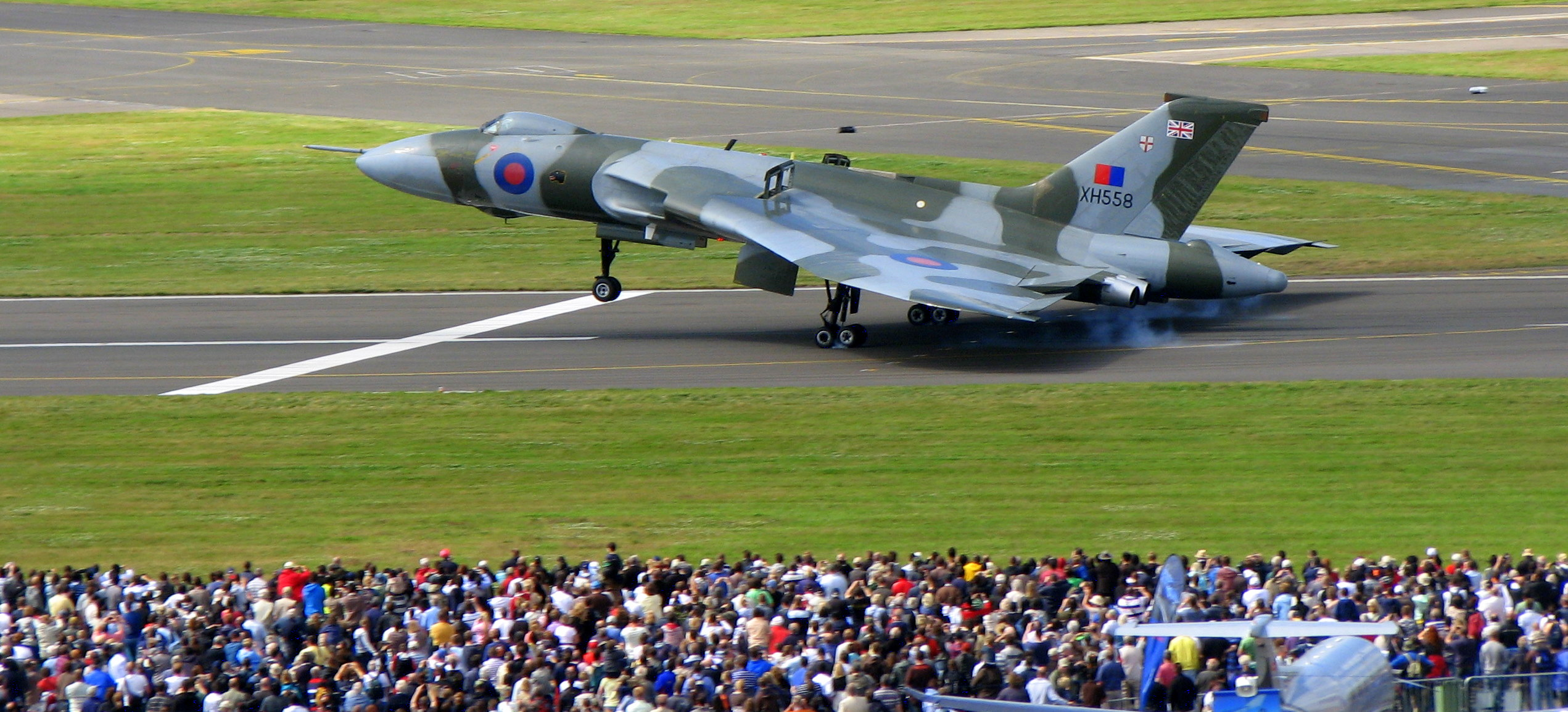
Landing during Farnborough Airshow 2008

Having been put up for disposal, XH558 was acquired by the Walton family, and delivered by air to Bruntingthorpe Aerodrome in Leicestershire on 23 March 1993, its last flight of the 20th Century. It was kept in serviceable condition, performing fast runs along the main runway along with other fast jets during special open days.

A decade earlier, shortly after the Waltons had acquired Bruntingthorpe, plans had been drawn up to fly the preserved XM575 from East Midlands Airport to their planned aircraft museum, although it never took place as the money ran out before the necessary servicing could be completed.

In 1997, a study was conducted looking into the feasibility of returning XH558 to flight – a risky prospect for the owners considering the aircraft would need to be retired as a ground-based attraction and largely dismantled before restoration could begin. With the decision taken in 1998, the last public ground run took place on 5 September 1999.

The Vulcan to the Sky Trust was established to raise funds; including lodging an application with the Heritage Lottery Fund, rejected in 2002 but then refocused and accepted in 2004. Work began on the restoration in 2005; to bring confidence to donors of the project, the Walton family formally passed ownership of XH558 to the Trust in the same year. In celebration of meeting a funding target, on 31 August XH558 was rolled out of its hangar for the first time in seven years for a publicity shoot.

XH558 returned to flight for the first time on 18 October 2007, conducting three test flights. Given the civilian registration of G-VLCN by the Civil Aviation Authority (CAA), an exemption was made to allow it to fly in Royal Air Force markings as XH558. During part of May 2008, XH558 resided at RAF Coningsby where it underwent further testing, and while there took part in a photo-call with the Lancaster and a Typhoon . On 9 June 2008, XH558 flew its final test flight, a 98-minute journey from Bruntingthorpe, which included a display in front of examiners from the CAA. Deemed a success, an application for a permit to fly at air shows was submitted to the CAA, with a view to attending its first public event in 15 years, the RAF Waddington Airshow, on 5 and 6 July.

The CAA granted permission for XH558 to fly from Bruntingthorpe to Waddington on Thursday 3 July, but authorisation for display flights was not granted until the Friday, allowing the first display flight, lasting five minutes, to go ahead on the Saturday in front of an estimated crowd of 125,000. An electrical fault prevented it from flying on the Sunday.

XH558 was named Spirit of Great Britain in 2010.

A combination of factors resulted in a decision at the end of 2012 to retire XH558 after the end of the 2013 season. After another feasibility study the decision was reversed and a major funding drive launched, which resulted in the required engineering work being done to ensure XH558 flew for the 2014 and 2015 seasons – see Operation 2015.

=== Retirement ===
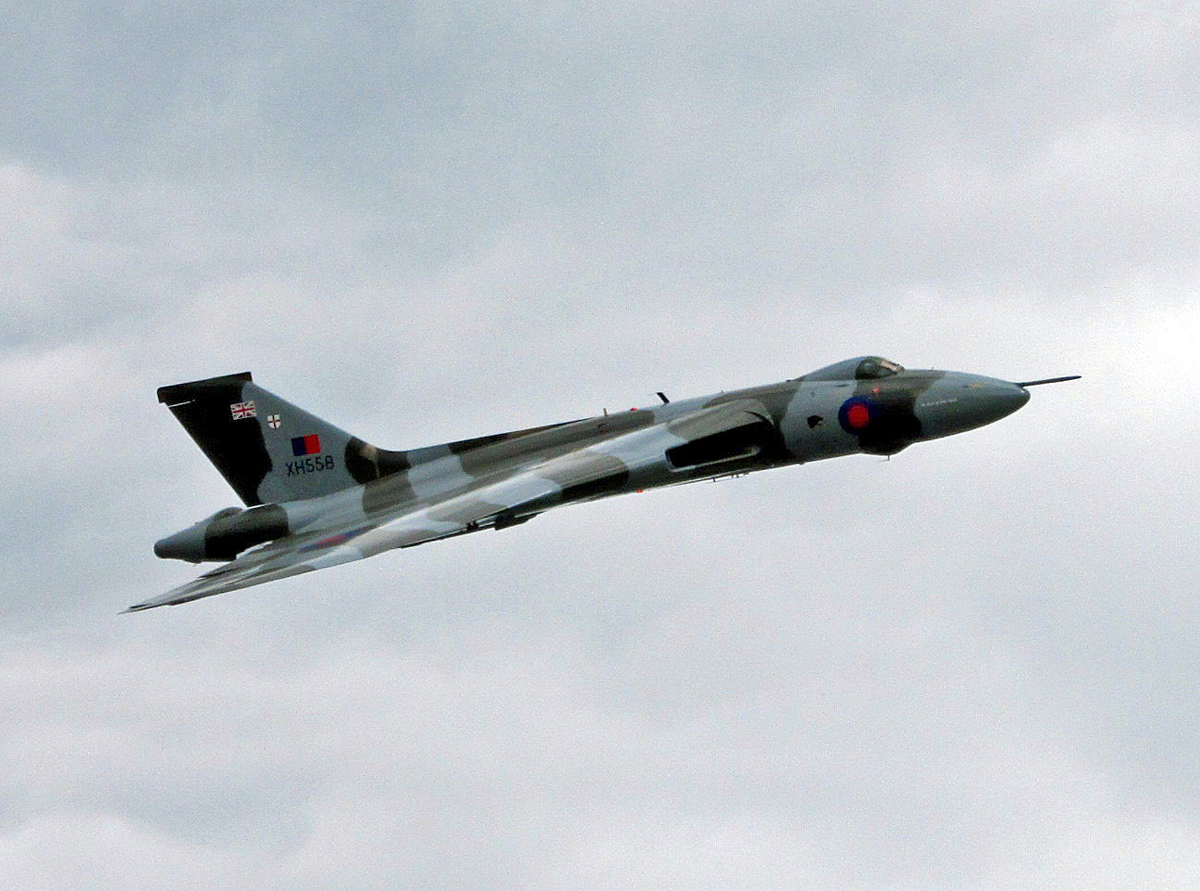
XH558 over Woodford Aerodrome, 27 June 2015

On 15 May 2015 it was announced that 2015 would be XH558's last flying season.

The UK Civil Aviation Authority rescinded its 'Permit to fly'

Various options to continue flights beyond 2015 were considered and ultimately rejected for engineering, cost, practicality or other reasons outside of the Trust's control – limiting the hours flown in 2015, building new Olympus engines and sourcing parts from other Vulcans, training new staff, using other technical authorities, and even relocating XH558 to another country. As a result, following completion of the 2015 Farewell to Flight display season, XH558's final ever flight occurred on 28 October 2015, a small display at its Doncaster Sheffield base.

=== Future plans ===
With XH558 now permanently grounded, the Trust intended to make the Vulcan the focus of a new educational and heritage facility at Doncaster Sheffield Airport, but was given notice to quit in August 2022, with a final occupancy date of June 2023. This was coincidental with the announcement of the commercial failure and possible closure of the airport. In December 2024, the Vulcan To The Sky Trust confirmed that the long term future of XH558 at Doncaster had been secured in principle.

The Trust's ongoing commitment was to keep XH558 in good condition and use it for educational purposes, which they committed to do for 80 years as a condition of the 2005 Lottery funding. The first stage was to establish the Vulcan Aviation Academy & Heritage Centre, involving an academy building for 14–18 year olds, focussing on "six areas of aviation skills: piloting, air traffic controls, airport ground operations, aircraft operations, cabin crew and aviation engineering". XH558 would be housed in an adjacent heritage centre, where it will be maintained so as to be able to perform taxi runs, the frequency of which would be funding-dependent. With less engineering required to support the Vulcan as a taxi-able exhibit, the Trust's associated engineering company was examining the possibility of setting up as an independent, CAA-approved, heritage aviation servicing operation. As a result of the new focus post-flight operations, the Trust's additional base at Hinckley was also to close.

== Displays ==
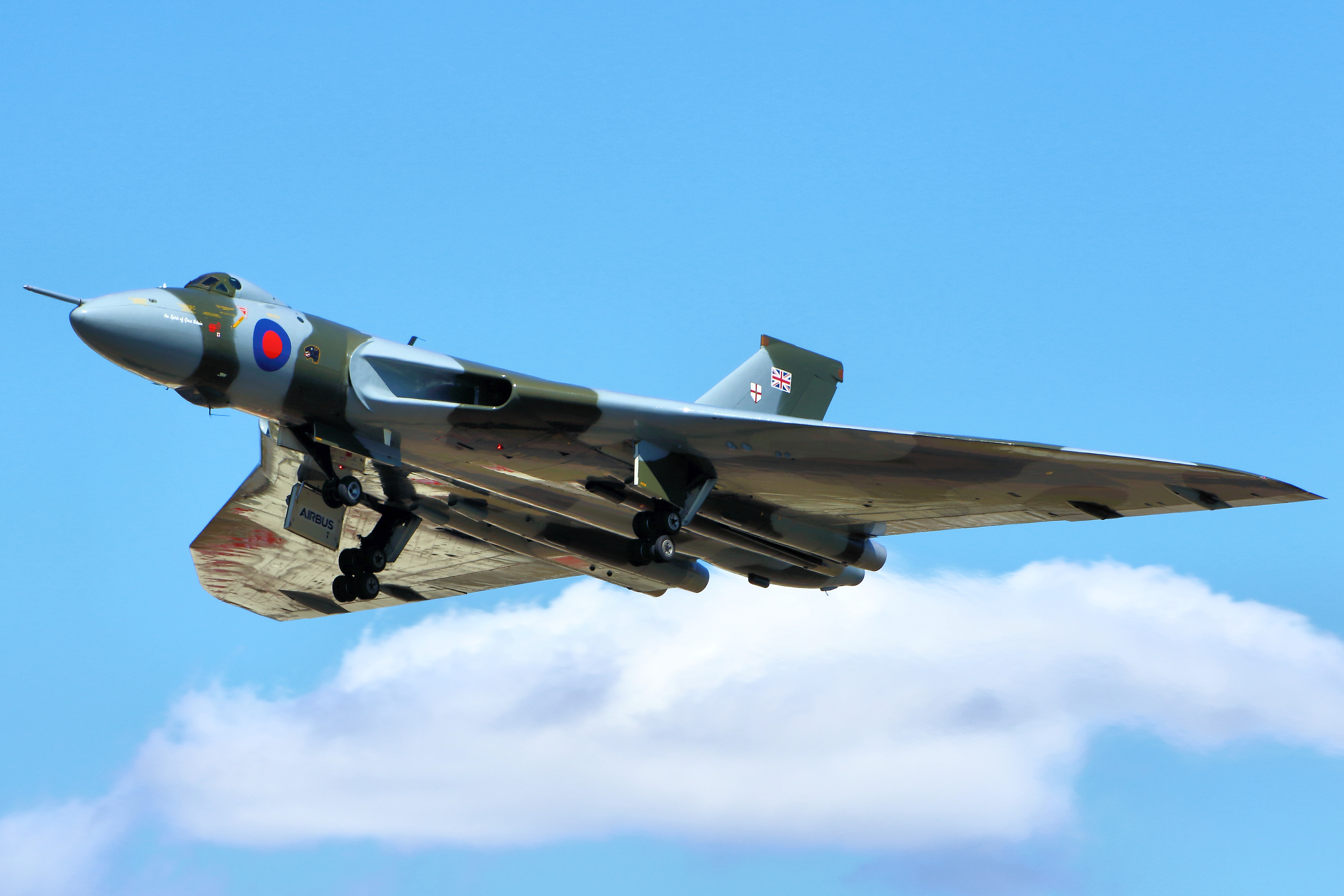
XH558 at RIAT 2015 during its final display season

Although XH558 had achieved its first flight in 2007, delays had meant it was unable to return to the display circuit for the 2007 season as had been hoped, or join the flypast down The Mall in London on 17 June 2007 marking the 25th Anniversary of the Falklands War. Post-restoration, displays were conducted every year from the 2008 to 2015 seasons inclusive, helping the Trust to exceed the requirement placed as part of the Heritage Lottery Fund grant to fly for at least 250 hours.

The first post-restoration display at RAF Waddington comprised a flypast with the Avro Lancaster of the Battle of Britain Memorial Flight, and then a solo display. For the first season, it was anticipated the Vulcan would be able to perform 13 appearances. Ultimately however, three appearances were cancelled due to technical problems, two due to bad weather and three due to a fault in No. 2 engine.

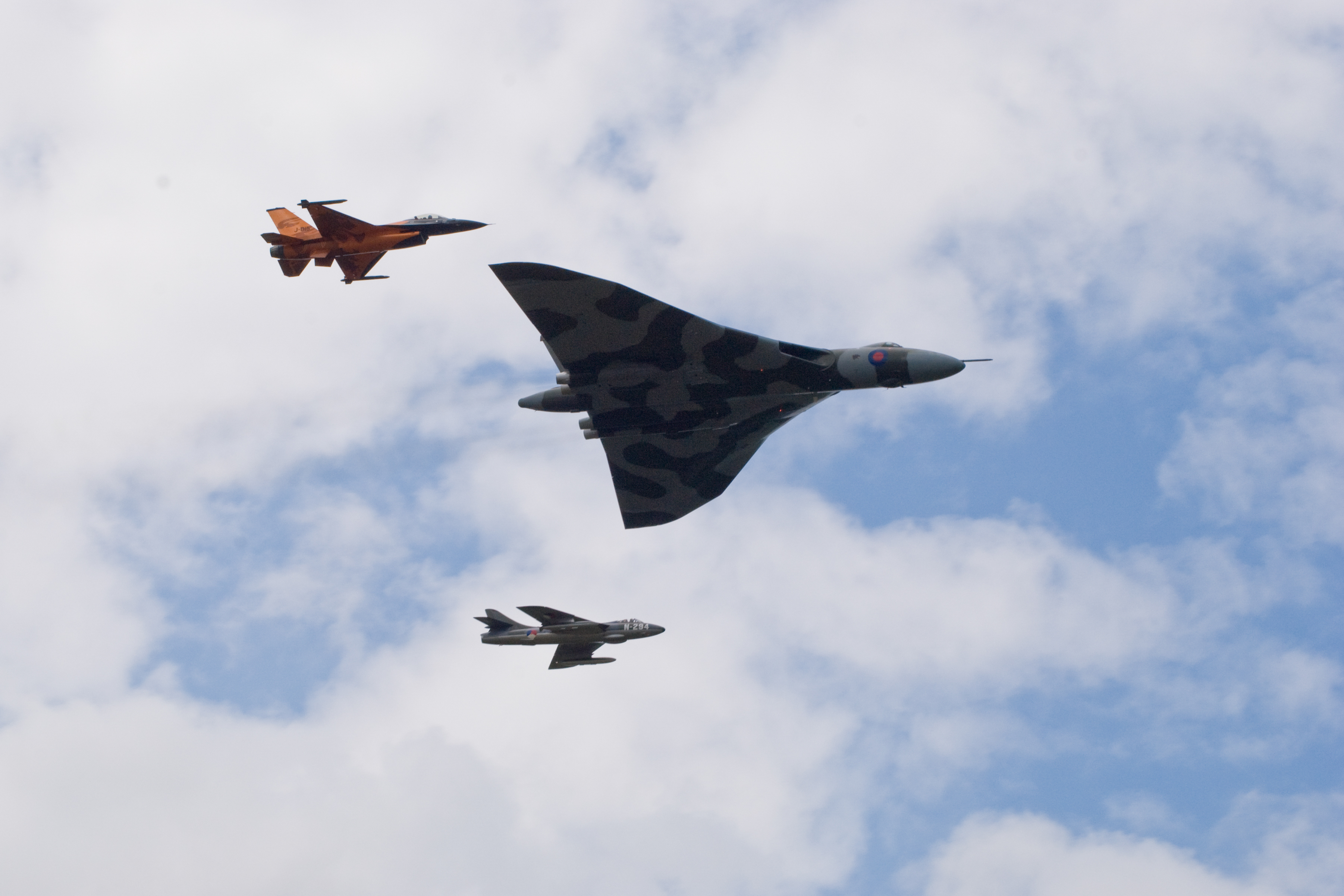
Vulcan XH55 with RNLAF F-16AM 'Orange Lion' and the DHHF Hunter F.6A XF515 (G-KAXF) as RNLAF 'N-294' in formation over Volkel Air Base, Netherlands, 20 June 2009

It was estimated that 3.8 million people saw XH558 in the summer of 2008, 1.5 million at displays. In 2009, she made her first and only appearance abroad, when she attended the Royal Netherlands Air Force Open Days at Volkel Air Base in the Netherlands. A popular feature of XH558 as flypasts and air shows is the so-called "Vulcan Howl", a distinctive sound made by some Vulcan airframes when the engines are at approximately 90 percent power, due to the arrangement of the air intakes.

In order to extend the life of the aircraft, for the 2010 season the flight time was limited to between 30 and 40 hours, reducing the number of air show appearances from 2009. Some two-day fly-in shows were limited to just one appearance, with the first day being given preference to allow the second day to act as a reserve in case of technical or weather difficulties.

A leak in the fuel tanks caused several August 2011 airshow appearances to be cancelled.

To celebrate 2012 being the 60th anniversary (Diamond Jubilee) of both the first flight of the Vulcan and the accession of Elizabeth II, it was planned for XH558 to visit over 30 displays on a tour to celebrate Britain's aviation and engineering achievements during the Queen's reign. The engine failure in May led to some of these being cancelled. Following the engine replacements in 2012, XH558 opened the 2012 Farnborough International Airshow flying in formation with the Red Arrows.

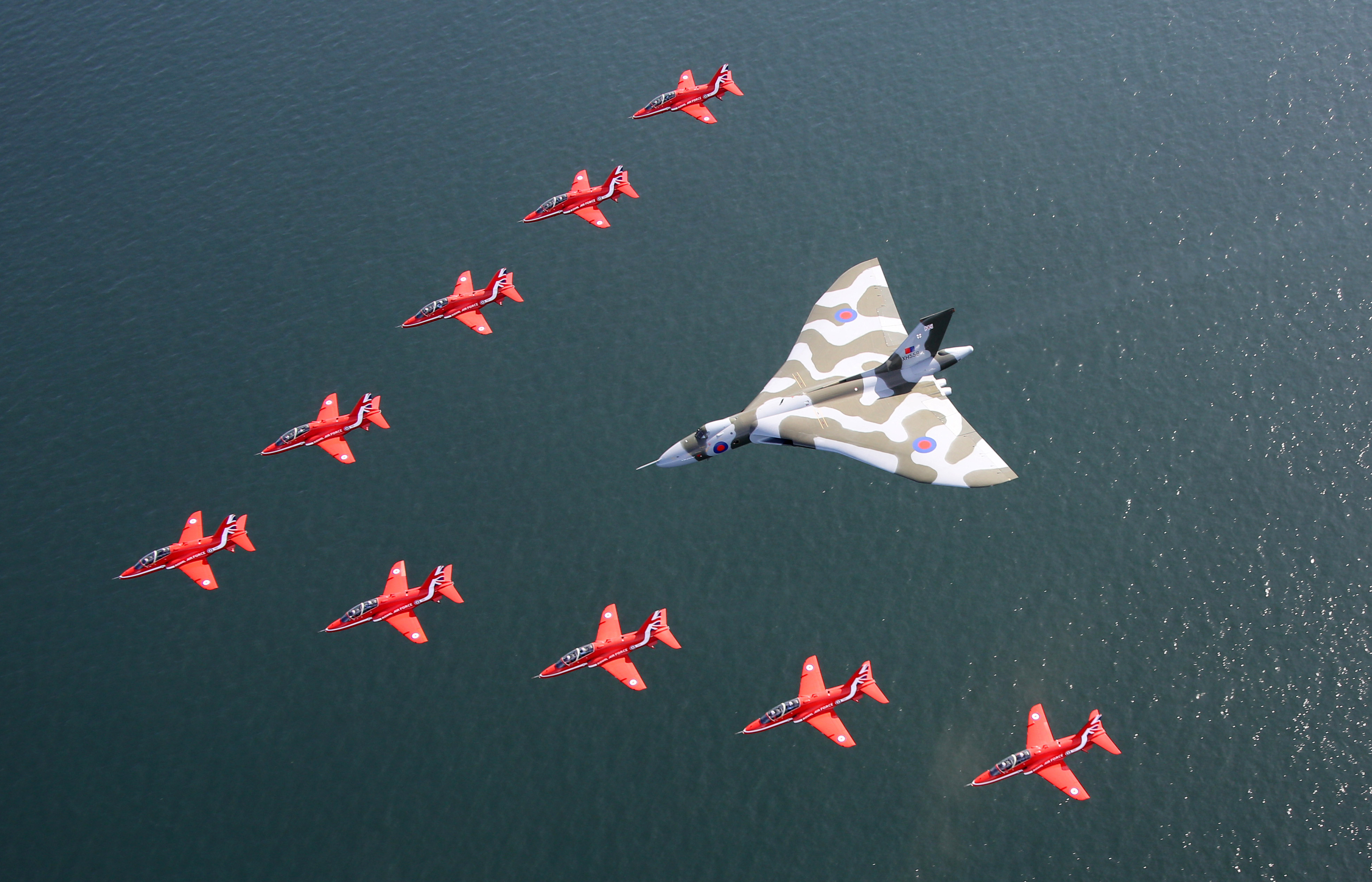
XH558 flypast with the Red Arrows for the final time on 19 September 2015 at Southport Airshow

The final season began on 6 June 2015 with a display at Throckmorton, Worcestershire. it proceeded as planned with into August with only one cancellation, the mini-display for the Flywheel Festival in Bicester, Oxfordshire, on 21 June. Displays up to August included the Salute the V-Force Tour on the weekend of 27 and 28 June, which saw XH558 visit the locations of every surviving V-bomber airframe.

A planned weekend appearance on 21/22 August 2015 at the Shoreham Airshow was interrupted by the crash of a Hawker Hunter. The Hunter crashed on the first day, just before 13.30 (BST), with the Vulcan due to appear at 14.05. A de Havilland Sea Vixen that was already airborne for the next display instead flew a tribute, with XH558 doing the same at its allotted time, the last aircraft to fly on the day.

As a result of the crash, on 24 August the CAA imposed temporary regulations on civilian vintage jets displaying over land, restricting them to flypasts and banning high energy aerobatics. Citing this restriction on the Vulcan, on 26 August the Durham Tees Valley air show planned for 29 August was postponed to 2016. The following day however, the Trust confirmed that after discussions with the CAA it was determined that XH558's display routine is not classified as aerobatic, and therefore the Vulcan would continue to fly with only minor changes to the display.

Until the Shoreham crash, the last flying season of the Vulcan was attributed as one of the reasons for sell-out crowds at air shows across the country, although in the week after it was not expected to affect spectator numbers at other shows, most of which were due to go ahead on the August Bank Holiday weekend with only minor alterations.

The final airshow appearances were confirmed to be at Gaydon Heritage Motor Centre (Warwickshire) and Old Warden (Bedfordshire) both on 4 October.

Vulcan XH558 flew a final national tour on 10 and 11 October 2015. The tour was split into two halves with the northern route being flown on 10 October and the southern route being flown on 11 October. The tour incorporated waypoints which including several locations significant to both the life of XH558 and the V-Force as a whole. Waypoints included:

- XH558's birthplace, the Avro factory at Woodford Aerodrome on the outskirts of Manchester.
- The Rolls-Royce factory in Derby.
- Chadderton, a former major Avro component factory on the outskirts of Manchester.
- RAF Waddington (Operational Base 1960–1968)
- MOD St Athan, formerly RAF St Athan, the main Aircraft Maintenance Unit for Vulcans
- RAF Brize Norton
- RAF Cosford
- Bruntingthorpe (Ex-RAF V-Force Dispersal Base)
- Leeming (Ex-RAF V-Force Dispersal Base)
- Manston (Ex-RAF V-Force Dispersal Base)
- Barnoldswick, where Rolls-Royce RB engines were built
- Warton Aerodrome

At least two further flights were planned for late October.

== Engineering ==
=== Restoration ===
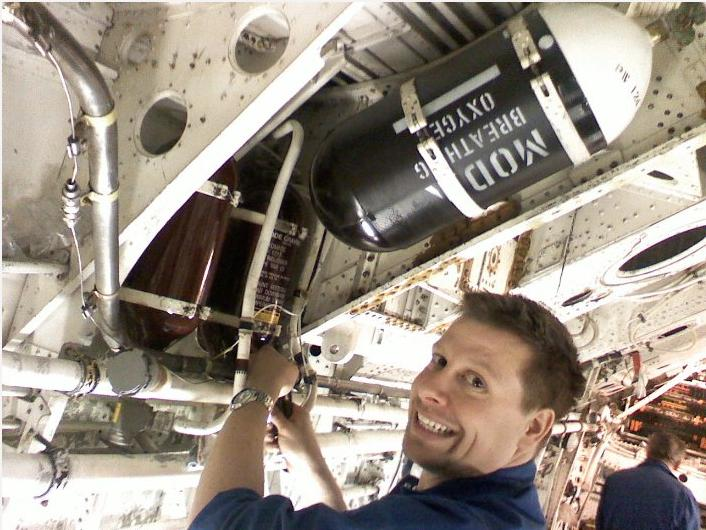
Installing a refurbished engine fire-bottle onto XH558

According to Andrew Edmondson, engineering director of the Trust, the restoration of XH558 was "the most complex return-to-flight project ever attempted in the world". The Trust's head often references the 11-year gap between the first flights of the Lancaster bomber and the Vulcan to highlight to the public what a tremendous technological leap forward it was. It is classified by the CAA in the complex category, because there are no manual backups to the powered systems.

Included in the sale to the Walton family were eight engines and 17.5 tons of spares. To execute the restoration, David Walton established The Vulcan Operating Company (TVOC) as an engineering division of C Walton Ltd, owners of Bruntingthorpe airfield. As a suitably approved organisation, Marshall Aerospace were appointed to provide the necessary design authority required for converting a military aircraft to a civil one according to CAA standards. After the transfer of XH558 from the Walton family to the Trust, TVOC/Marshall continued to execute the project in the same hangar.

The restoration removed the redundant offensive and defensive systems, including the navigation and H2S radar, reducing the maximum all up weight to 146,000 lb. This includes dead weight which had to be re-added in certain places, to re-balance the aircraft. As part of the restoration, all four of the Vulcan's original Olympus 202 engines were replaced with the zero-hour units which had been stored since 1982. The removed engines were either scrapped, sectioned for display or passed on to the Vulcan Restoration Trust for XL426 at Southend. On 17 August 2007, XH558's No.3 Rolls-Royce Olympus 202 jet engine was run for the first time in over 20 years. On 22 August, all four were run at nearly full power settings, for short intervals.

Various electrical faults disrupted the April 2008 test flights – on the 14th a trip to RAF Cottesmore resulted in the crew declaring an emergency and landing at Cottesmore believing the auxiliary power unit (APU) was on fire, only to find later it was simply a faulty warning light. Another flight two days later had to be ended because one of the undercarriage doors failed to close, found to be micro-switch malfunction. Major technical issues discovered during the first year of flight included difficulties with interfacing modern airport electrical systems with the Vulcan's electrical systems, and ingress of water into the airframe in wet weather.

=== Post-restoration ===
As the aircraft operated under visual flight rules (VFR), it could not fly through clouds to higher altitudes where turbulence is lower, as this would require instrument flight rules (IFR) certification. Flying VFR in lower, often turbulent air, the airframe suffers from more fatigue which increases fatigue-index (FI) consumption. A longer-term aim was to make the authorised modifications depending on the usage of fatigue index and engine cycle, to allow the fatigue life to match expected engine life with both expiring at about the same time.

On 28 May 2012, during a take-off run from Doncaster Sheffield Airport on a practice flight, both port engines suffered catastrophic failures, closing the airport for 90 minutes. The cause was ingestion of silica gel desiccant bags into No. 1 engine, which failed and led to debris entering No. 2 engine - the pre-flight inspection by engineers had not been properly carried out. Although no structural damage occurred, both engines were written off, requiring replacement from the Trust's stock of new engines.

It was determined that the silica gel packs should never have been in use. They were put into engine intakes with the idea that they would absorb moisture and thus reduce corrosion. This was a fundamentally flawed idea given that the engines were not in a sealed environment. Also the packs did not have warning flags attached and there was no procedure in place - such as a 'shadow board' - to double check that they had been removed.

Major wing structural modifications were undertaken in March 2014 which extended the life of the airframe long enough to perform the 2014 and 2015 seasons – see Operation 2015.

== Funding ==
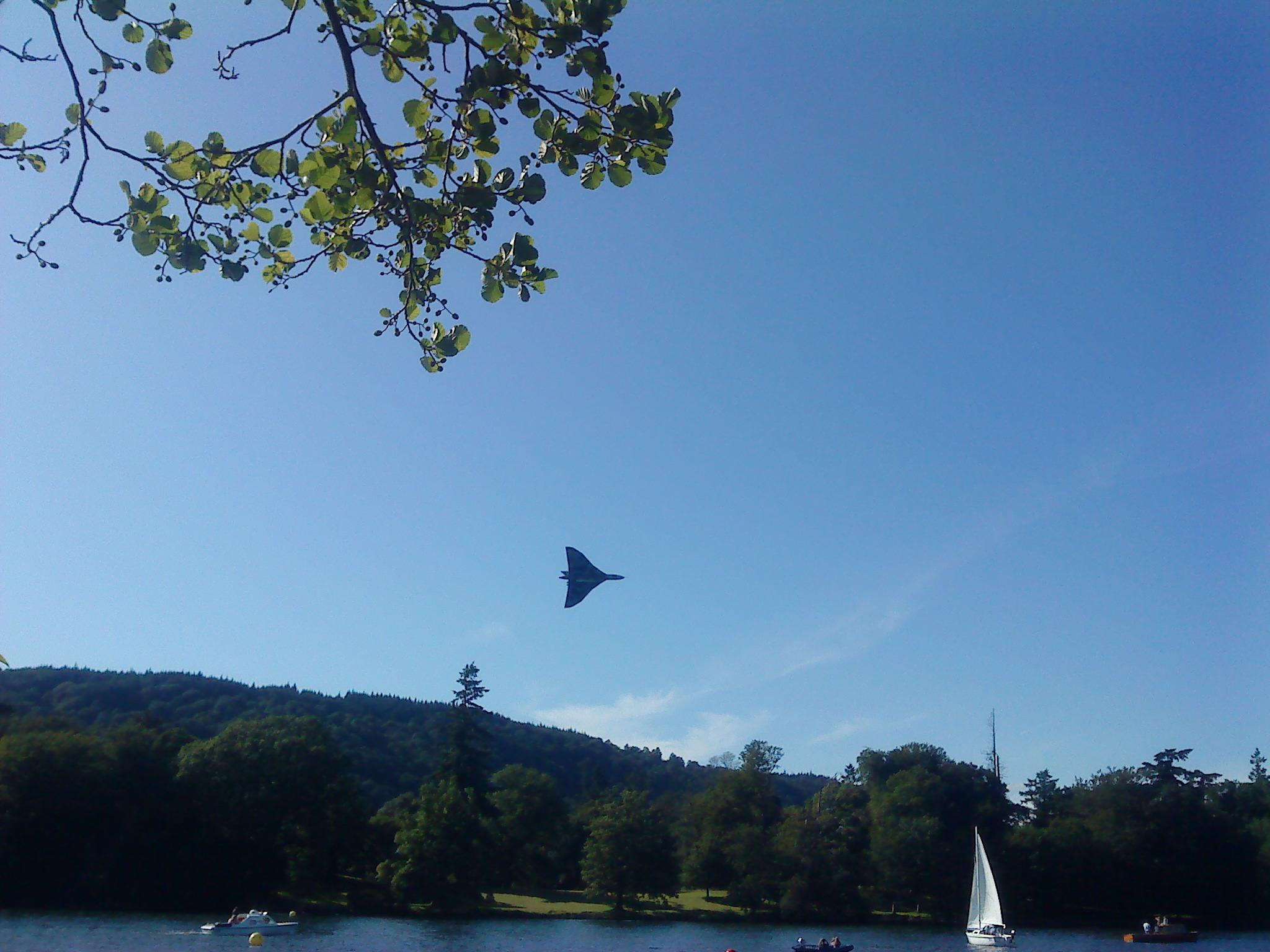
Windermere Airshow 2009

=== To first flight ===
Fundraising by the Vulcan to the Sky Trust commenced in 1999. In terms of public campaigning, the Trust was also assisted by a supporters club, Vulcan to the Sky Club (formerly Vulcan 558 Club).

An application to the Heritage Lottery Fund lodged in 2001 was controversially rejected a year later, attributed to the fund's lack of enthusiasm for flight projects. On the HLF's advice, the bid was refocused and a resubmitted proposal in 2003 was accepted; £2,734,000 being awarded on 23 June 2004. A total of £1m from supporters had also been raised from donors by the time the restoration commenced in 2005. As well as continued donations, further financial support arrived in the form of free goods and services from companies. Technical assistance and work in kind was also received from many of the original equipment manufacturers.

The project faced a funding crisis in 2006, with an appeal being sent out on 1 August for £1.2m to be raised by the end of the month, or the restoration would have to be suspended indefinitely. The target was reached thanks in part to a last minute donation of £500,000 from a mystery donor. The donor was later named as Sir Jack Hayward, a British philanthropist. This topped off the £860,000 already raised.

By the time of the first test flight, £6.5m had been raised, rising to £7m by the time of the first display.

=== Ongoing ===
With the return to flying, consideration was given to using the Vulcan as a flying billboard as a way to generate continued funding. Once restored to flight, some money was able to be recouped by charging a fee for a display (£8,000 for a full display, in the first year). Based on a flight time of 50 hours, the fuel bill alone was £160,000 at 2008 prices.

A commercial donation secured before the first ever display allowed the Trust to commit to attending the Royal International Air Tattoo at Fairford and Farnborough International Airshow in the first display season, where it was hoped significant commercial sponsorship could be secured.

The Great Recession thwarted plans to secure major commercial sponsorship, with the Trust also believing XH558's past as a nuclear bomber made some investors reluctant to get involved. After its first display season, the operating costs for one year's flight were estimated as £1.6m per year, with insurance alone costing £180,000, leading to an appeal being launched in December 2008 to raise £1m in four months, with the Trust saying it needed a "miracle" with one month to go, having put the engineering staff on notice. On 6 March 2009, the appeal reached its target.

During this crisis, appeals were made to the government to step in, with celebrity supporters Richard Branson, Robin Gibb, Frederick Forsyth and Air Chief Marshal Michael Knight appealing in national newspapers for XH558 to be added to the Battle of Britain Memorial Flight and the Trust starting a Downing Street petition for government funding.

A shortfall in donations again attributed to the recession sparked another funding crisis in early 2010, with staff again put on notice and £650,000 needing to be raised by the end of March. With funding for maintenance work brought forward from 2011 also required, the Vulcan 50th Birthday appeal was launched to raise £800,000 by the end of March. This was met with the help of an anonymous donation of £400,000 on 24 February, allowing maintenance to begin. With the ongoing absence of a major sponsor, the Trust continued to rely on monthly public donations.

After the final display of the 2010 season on 26 September, the Trust again warned of a shortfall in part due to the recession, launching an appeal for the £400,000 required by the end of October to fund the project through the winter maintenance period. Despite reaching a critical stage in the last few days and ultimately falling slightly short of the target, it was decided enough money had been raised to avert permanently grounding the aircraft, with hopes to display it for another two seasons.

Having funded the winter 2010/11 maintenance, it was hoped that increased marketing and a record season of displays in 2010 would make the need for a summer funding drive unnecessary. This didn't prove to be the case due to rising fuel costs and VAT regulation changes, requiring another appeal for £350,000 to be raised by May.

At 2012 prices, without taking into account any additional repairs required, the yearly cost of general maintenance, fuel and insurance for one year's display flight was over £2m, still far beyond the earnings made from the actual displays, meaning the project continued to be reliant on donations or other sources of fundraising.

Even though it was now expected to be its last due to the engineering situation, the ability to even complete the 2013 season was also cast into doubt when the drive to fund the ordinary winter maintenance period only raised half of the target of £400,000.

With the plan to retire XH558 after 2013 later reversed, at the start of the 2013 season a major funding drive was announced to address various issues with the goal of securing flight to the end of the 2015 season – see Operation 2015.

== Operation 2015 ==
On the ground at RAF Leuchars, 2009

At the end of the 2012 season it was announced that 2013 would likely be the last, due to the fact the wings will have reached the end of their permitted flying life without a life-extending rectification (leading edge skin reinforcement) costing £200,000. This carried risks due to the inability to correct any mistakes without the original tooling, which no longer existed. A contributing factor was the lack of any new engines being available due to using the last two spares after the failures in May, with refurbishment of others not being feasible. Several other spare part stocks were also reaching critical levels, which would be prohibitively expensive to replenish.

In early 2013 a feasibility study by Cranfield Aerospace concluded the wing repair was possible, involving the reverse engineering of the parts required to perform Avro's original Modification 2221. This would then extend their flying life by two years. Consequently, at the start of the 2013 season the Trust reversed the decision to ground XH558 at the end of it, and announced the Operation 2015 pledge drive with the intention of performing full seasons in 2014 and 2015. The drive would fund three key activities – the wing repair itself in the off-season, plus the funding of the ordinary 2013/4 winter maintenance, and the replenishment of critical spares to the end of the 2015 season. It was not anticipated that flying beyond 2015 would be possible, as by then the engine life will have been exhausted, and several other components would be required that would be prohibitively expensive to refurbish or reproduce. The wing modification was completed by March 2014.

== Operating bases ==
XH558's first home after its RAF career (from 1993) was at the Bruntingthorpe Aerodrome in Leicestershire, owned by the Walton family. Opened in 1942 as RAF Bruntingthorpe, it now served as a private airport and proving ground.

For its first summer display season (2008), XH558 was based at RAF Brize Norton in Oxfordshire, returning to its maintenance base at Bruntingthorpe in winter. It was also a regular visitor to RAF Waddington for summer practice flights, as it offered more flexibility than Bruntingthorpe. In the early years, some display venues had apparently underestimated the available space and towing vehicles required to handle an aircraft as big and heavy as XH558. The Brize Norton summer / Bruntingthorpe winter base pattern was repeated for 2009.

At the end of 2009, XH558 was moved from its Bruntingthorpe winter base to a new temporary base at RAF Lyneham in Wiltshire, an active RAF station, while the Trust's offices were relocated to Hinckley, Leicestershire. The move was for cost and logistical reasons, particularly the ongoing risk of foreign body damage to XH558 due to the high level of use of Bruntingthorpe's runway. For the summer 2010 display season XH558 was again moved to RAF Brize Norton.

In 2011, the Trust relocated to a new base at Doncaster Sheffield Airport, with XH558 flying from RAF Lyneham to Robin Hood on 29 March. The airport is the former RAF Finningley airbase where XH558 was previously based for 8 years during the 1960s. One of the reasons for the move to a commercial airport was to improve access for the public to see XH558 up close, something not possible while based at operational RAF bases. The move from Lyneham to Doncaster Sheffield was deliberately not announced in advance, both to keep costs down at the not yet complete new base, and to not overshadow ongoing repatriation flights of Britain's war casualties to Lyneham from Afghanistan.

== Crew ==
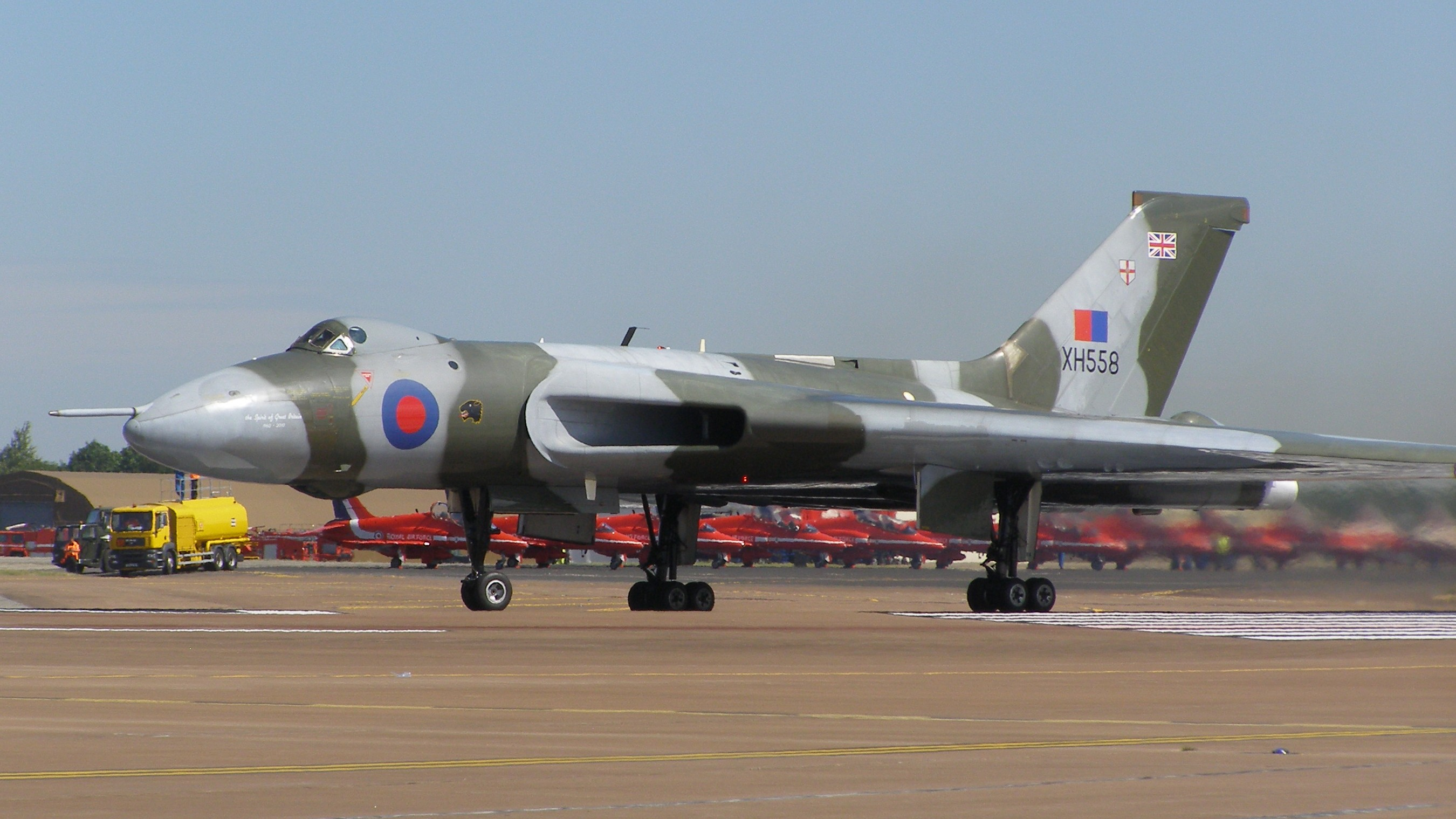
Lining up for departure from RAF Fairford at the end of the 2010 Royal International Air Tattoo

In civilian configuration XH558 only requires a crew of three to fly – two pilots and the air electronics officer (AEO). When visiting other airfields, a crew chief is added. Assistance with pre-flight training of the crew was provided by the owners of ground operational Vulcans XM655 and XL426. Pilots are said to find the restored XH558 a pleasure to fly. Ian Young, chief test pilot for Marshall Aerospace, oversaw the testing phase. David Thomas was pilot for the first public display at Waddington.

XH558 was crewed by a team of former RAF personnel, headed by Martin Withers DFC, its then Chief Pilot and Operations Manager.

== Cold War ==
One of the reasons the Heritage Lottery Fund accepted the Trust's resubmitted proposal in 2003 was because it had been suitably refocused on the educational aspects of the restoration with reference to the Vulcan's role as a nuclear deterrent during the Cold War, in which the permanent readiness of the V-Force provided the credible second strike capability to deter a first strike by the Soviet Union. The Trust saw part of XH558's role as ongoing living history, to be a potent reminder to the next generation of how close the world came to the brink of destruction. According to BBC journalist Robert Hall, commenting on this sinister reminder during the final stages of test flights, the "debate over whether a symbol of destruction should be restored will continue".

== Falklands War ==
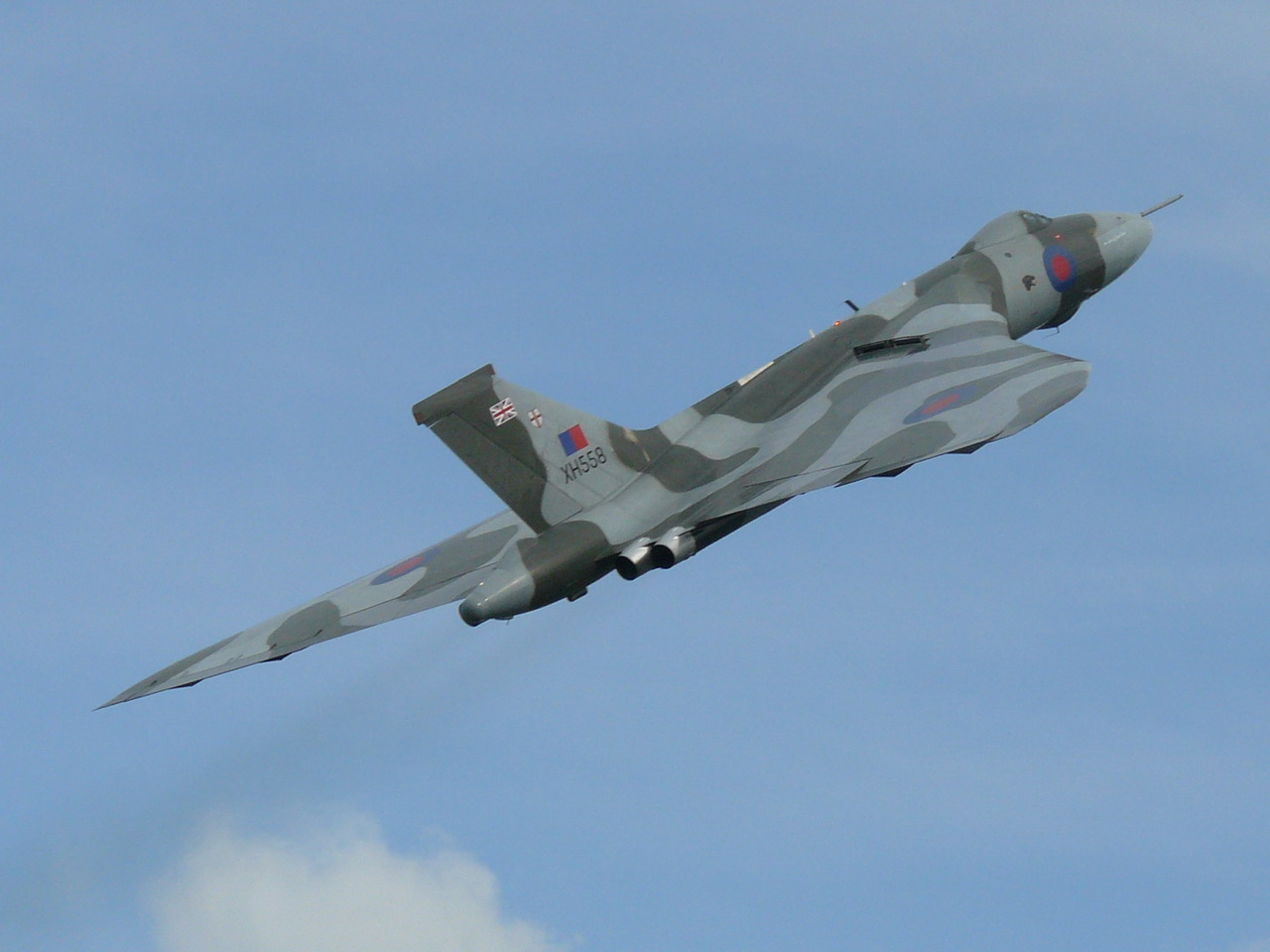
Abingdon Air & Country Show 2011

The only offensive operations for the Vulcan came in the 1982 Falklands War, by which time only 32 were still in service. The best 10 were selected for use on the Black Buck raids. Having been converted to the maritime reconnaissance role in 1973, XH558 was not involved in the missions, although as the last remaining Vulcan it has been used twice in Falklands specific appearances:

- At the 2009 Victory Show in Cosby, Leicestershire, marking the 70th anniversary of World War II, XH558 was the headline act, performing a re-enactment of the first Black Buck bombing run, with the aid of pyrotechnics. According to the trust, this was the first re-enactment of the run ever performed in Britain.
- To mark the 30th anniversary of the conflict, on 21 May 2012 a new Falklands Memorial was unveiled at the National Memorial Arboretum. The ceremony was accompanied by a flypast of aircraft types involved in the conflict, led by XH558.

On both occasions, XH558 was piloted by Martin Withers, who also piloted Vulcan XM607, the bombing aircraft in the first Black Buck mission.

== See also ==
- List of surviving Avro Vulcans
