= Abingdon Air & Country Show =

- Genre: Air show
- Frequency: Annually
- Venue: Abingdon Airfield
- Locations: Abingdon, Oxfordshire
- Country: United Kingdom
- Established: 2000
- Attendance: 10,000 (2011)
- Major events: aerobatic displays static displays fly-in
- Website: abingdonairandcountry.co.uk

The Abingdon Air & Country Show is an annual air display staged in Abingdon, Oxfordshire. The show takes place at the semi-active Abingdon Airfield, the former RAF Abingdon now operated by the British Army as Dalton Barracks.

The show typically features a flying display containing a wide variety of historic and modern aircraft. There is also a static aircraft display and a Fly-in. On the ground, there is a range of country fair attractions.

== Accident/Incident ==
On 14 May 2017 a Silence Twister aerobatics plane crashed whilst performing a display. The pilot was injured but made a full recovery.

== History and organisation ==
The event first started in 2000 as a small fete. In the years since then, the show has grown in stature. Attendances have increased, and at the 2009 show, there were over 10,000 people. For many years, the show was known simply as the Abingdon Fayre, but in 2007, the show's title changed to Abingdon Air & Country Show to more accurately reflect the show's content.

The 2024 event, which had planned flypasts by both Spitfires and Hurricanes, was postponed at the last minute due to unforeseen circumstances related to communications with the Ministry of Defence. The event was rescheduled for September the same year.

Although held on a military establishment, the show is a civilian event. It is organised entirely by volunteers, with proceeds being donated to a local charity.

== Aircraft ==
A wide range of aircraft have performed flying displays at the show. These have included many modern and classic fast jets (for example Sepecat Jaguar, BAE Hawk, Hawker Hunter, Folland Gnat) military helicopters from the Royal Air Force and Royal Navy, historic warbirds like the Spitfire and Mustang and displays from light aerobatic aircraft. In 2009, there was a visit by an RAF C-17 Globemaster transport aircraft, and in 2011, the Avro Vulcan XH558 performed the closing display.

The show has also managed to attract international participation. In 2005, the Polish Navy brought a PZL M-28 for static display, while in both 2006 and 2008, the United States Army exhibited a UH-60 Black Hawk and in 2010, the Royal Netherlands Air Force F-16 display team performed. Traditionally, the show also includes participation from the resident No 612 Volunteer Gliding Squadron, which uses the airfield during the weekend for its flying activities.

The Fly-in also attracts a wide variety of aircraft from the UK's General aviation community.

== Ground displays ==
In addition to the flying activities, the event usually features a wide range of ground attractions, such as stalls and arena display along with vintage and classic vehicles.
