= Avro Vulcan XL426 =

One of three remaining taxiable Avro Vulcan aircraft

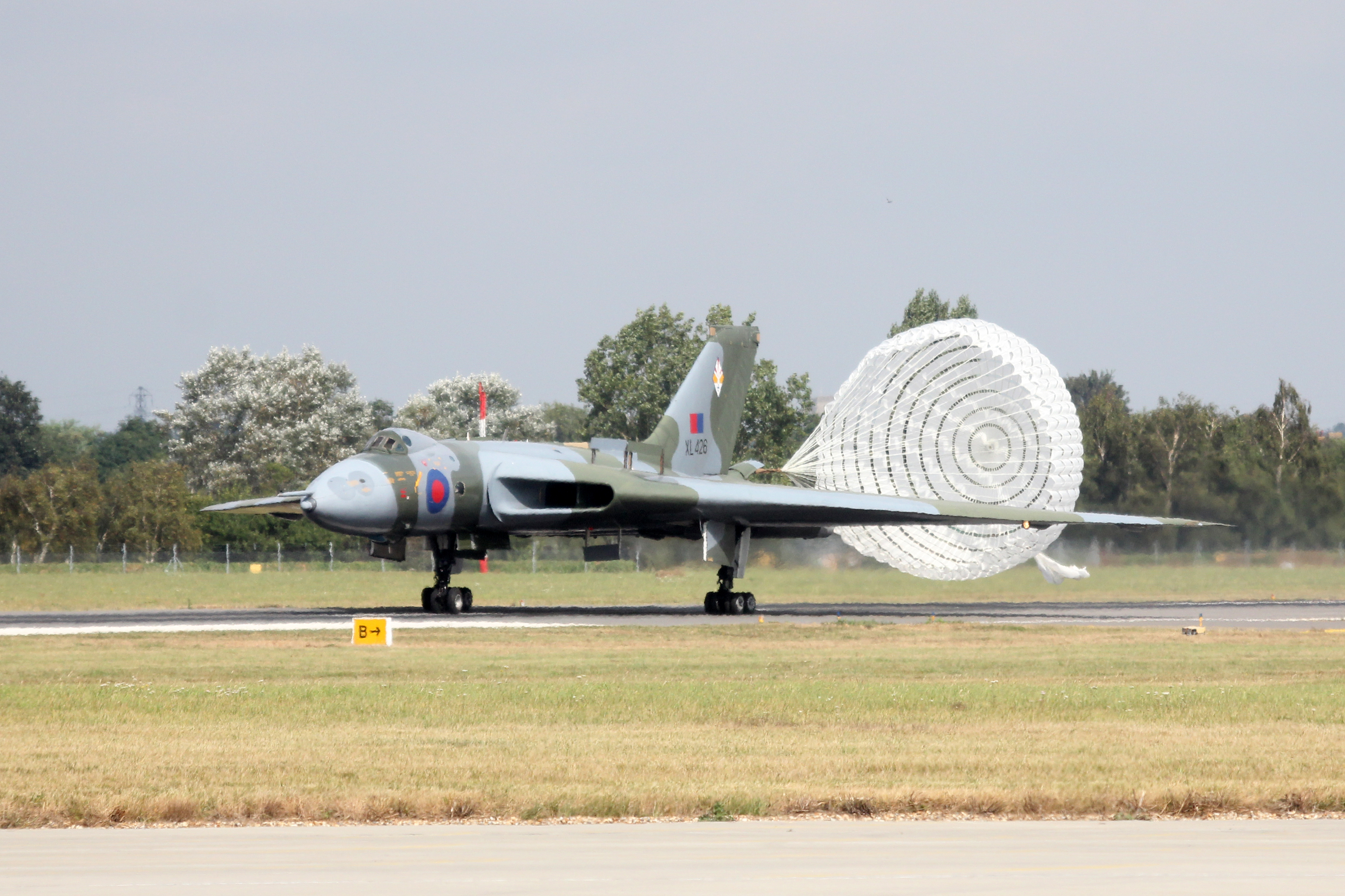
- XL426 taxiing at London Southend Airport in September 2021

General information
- Type: Avro Vulcan B2
- Manufacturer: Avro
- Status: Preserved in taxiable condition
- Registration: G-VJET
- Serial: XL426
- Total hours: 6,236

History
- First flight: 23 August 1962
- Last flight: 19 December 1986
- Preserved at: London Southend Airport, England

Avro Vulcan XL426 is one of three remaining taxiable Avro Vulcan strategic bombers, the other two being XH558 and XM655. It has been owned and maintained by the Southend-on-Sea-based registered charity the Vulcan Restoration Trust since 1993 and carries out regular taxi runs at London Southend Airport. It served with the Royal Air Force from 1962 to 1986.

== History ==
XL426 was part of the first batch of 24 Avro Vulcans ordered by the Royal Air Force on 25 February 1956. It was built at Avro's Chadderton and Woodford plants, like other Vulcans, and was the 44th of 88 Vulcan B2s built. Its first flight was on 23 August 1962, from Woodford Aerodrome, which lasted 1 hour and 35 minutes.

=== Royal Air Force ===
XL426 entered service with the Royal Air Force on 13 September 1962, initially in 83 Squadron. The aircraft had the pennant of senior RAF commander John Slessor painted on the side of its nose. On 10 September 1963, Slessor flew XL426 from CFB Goose Bay in Labrador, Canada to RAF Scampton in Lincolnshire, England in 4 hours and 5 minutes, an unofficial pre-Concorde Atlantic crossing speed record.

From April 1964, following a reorganisation of how aircraft were assigned to squadrons, XL426 was rotated between all squadrons at RAF Scampton (which was termed the "Scampton Wing"). This lasted until January 1971. XL426 was equipped with the nuclear missile Blue Steel until 1969, when the nuclear deterrent role was passed on to the Royal Navy.

From 1971 to 1981, XL426 mostly served with 617 Squadron but also served briefly with 27 Squadron and 230 Operational Conversion Unit. It was the 298th and last Vulcan to undergo a major service at RAF St Athan in 1981. At the end of the same year, XL426 was transferred to 50 Squadron at RAF Waddington, ultimately the last Vulcan squadron. The aircraft was also painted to its current green and grey camouflage livery around this time. XL426 took part in the Falklands Victory Flypast over London on 12 October 1982 (though it hadn't taken part in the war). Following the retirement of the Vulcan in 1984, XL426 was converted to a crew trainer.

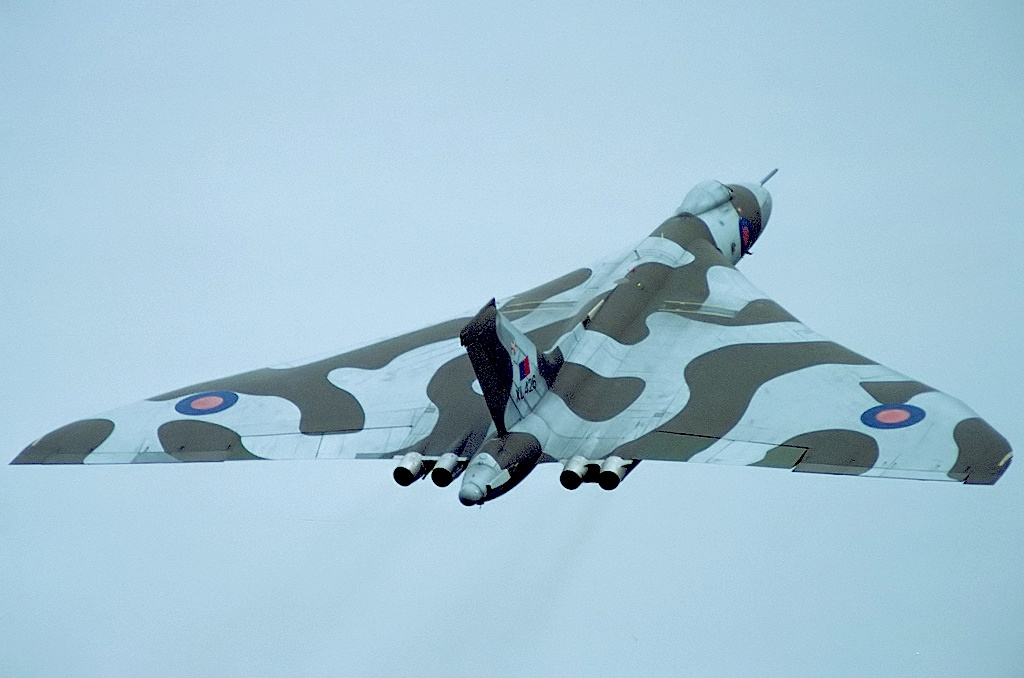
XL426 as part of the RAF Vulcan Display Flight in May 1985

XL426 gave dozens of display flights from 1984 to 1986 as part of the Vulcan Historical Flight (later Vulcan Display Flight). However, as its flying hours were running out before needing a major service, its role as a display flight aircraft was transferred to XH558, which had been retrieved from a fire dump at RAF Marham. XL426's final display flight was on 14 June 1986.

=== After service ===
XL426 was put up for sale in the summer of 1986, and after a failed deal with a French consortium, it was eventually sold to businessman Roy Jacobsen of Croydon, who had purchased another Vulcan, XM655, two years prior. The aircraft was delivered to London Southend Airport on 19 December 1986 (which would be its final flight) and became registered as a civilian aircraft on 7 July 1987, as G-VJET. It was flown to Southend as a result of a tentative agreement with local maintenance company HeavyLift Aircraft Engineering to maintain the aircraft. Jacobsen had plans to continue operating both aircraft for display flights and had formed an organisation called the Vulcan Memorial Flight. However, the funds could not be found, and the aircraft sat dormant at London Southend Airport, while XM655 sat dormant at Wellesbourne Mountford Airfield in Warwickshire. By its last flight, XL426 had made 1,891 flights and amassed 6,236 hours of flying time. During this time, XL426 was parked on the main apron of London Southend Airport and later the grass beside the apron, in full view of the terminal. In 1991, it was moved to the northern end of the airport's disused runway, out of public view.

In March 1990, local enthusiasts formed the Vulcan Memorial Flight Supporters Club (VMFSC) to support Jacobsen's plans and help maintain the aircraft. Jacobsen eventually transferred ownership of the aircraft to the VMFSC in July 1993, which reformed as the Vulcan Restoration Trust (VRT) and gained registered charity status in 1996. The VRT adopted the secondary goal of having XL426 operate as a taxi-only aircraft for display, should the main goal of airworthiness fail.

The aircraft underwent major servicing and in 1994 was repainted for the first time since leaving the RAF. In 1995, it was moved to a purpose-built pan by the railway line on the airport's eastern perimeter, where it was more visible to the public. On 7 October 1995, XL426 performed its first taxi run since moving to Southend. In spring 1997, it performed its first public high-speed taxi run on the main runway, during an airport open weekend. The VRT ultimately abandoned its goal of restoring the aircraft to airworthy condition and instead focussed on maintaining the aircraft in taxiable condition.

XL426 performed regular taxi displays from 1995 to 2005 at Southend Airport open days. The aircraft was repainted again in 2000–2001. In August 2005, the VRT suspended the aircraft's public taxi runs to carry out more major servicing works, which were termed the "Return to Power" programme. The aircraft carried out taxi runs in 2006 and October 2008. It was repainted in 2011–2014, with the obscured insignia of Squadrons 617 and 50 re-added on opposite sides of the tail fin. More taxi runs were carried out in April 2012, July 2014, June 2015, July 2016, December 2017, December 2018, November 2019 (which was the first carried out for the public since the 2005 suspension), December 2020, June 2021, September 2021, May 2022 and, for its 60th anniversary, August 2022. In 2023, XL426 began conducting more regular taxi runs in May (often termed the "Twilight Taxi-Run") and September (often termed the "Summer Taxi-Run") each year. The VRT continues to run 'Visit the Vulcan' days as of 2025, in which visitors can get an up-close look at the aircraft. The Trust aims to keep the aircraft in taxiable condition until at least around 2034. (Note: The Trust source states "another 20 years" but is undated. The year is calculated based on the mention of the "recently finished" 2011–2014 repaint and the "recent" slow taxis begun around 2014.)

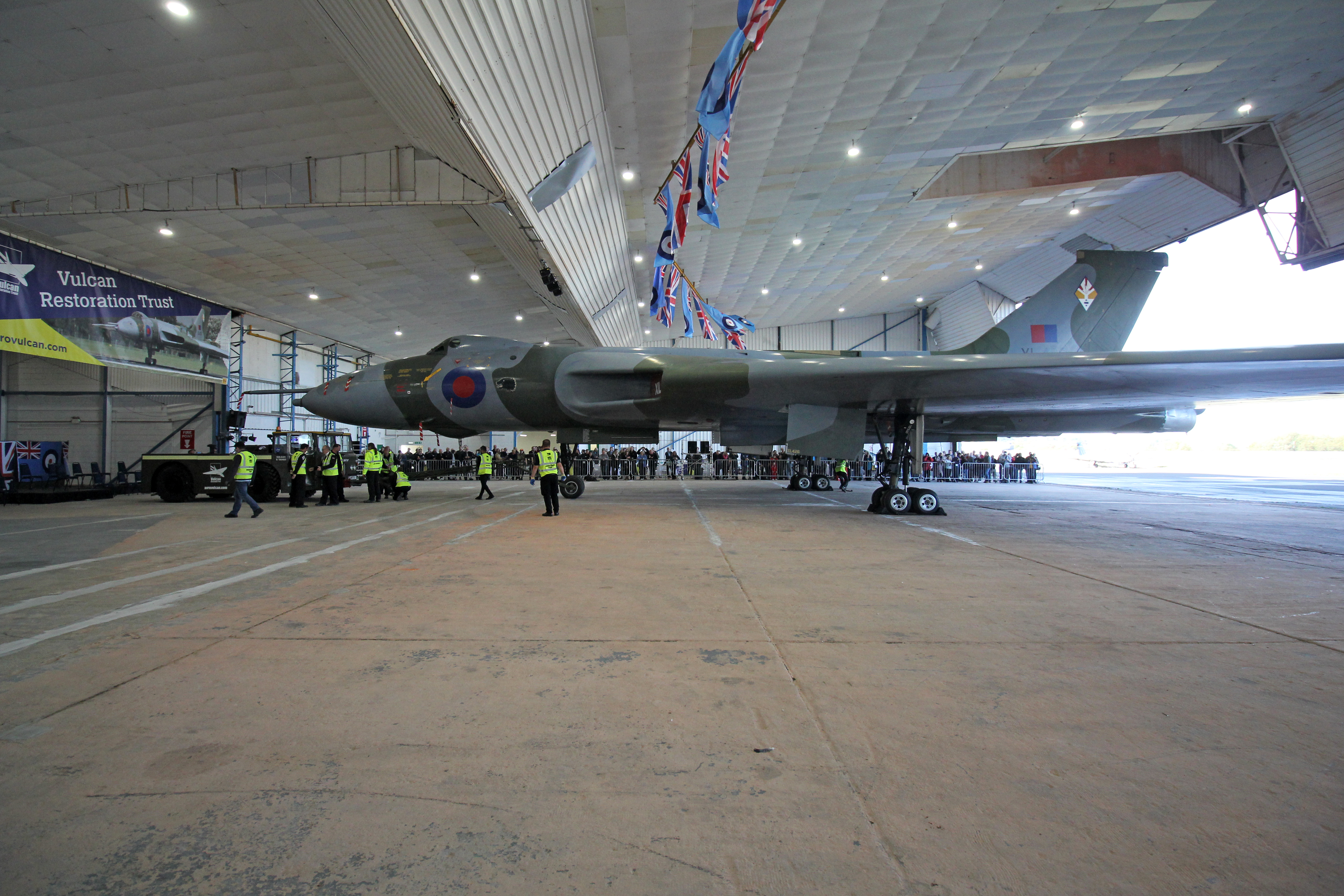
XL426 arriving in Hangar 6

In 2017, the aircraft spent a brief period indoors, inside Hangar 6 at Southend Airport, before having to vacate the building to allow Air Livery to relocate there following a fire in their hangar elsewhere on the Airport. From then until late 2022, XL426 was parked outside Hangar 5. Air Livery’s fire-damaged hangar was repaired, and the company vacated Hangar 6, which lay empty for a period. During 2022, the Vulcan Restoration Trust negotiated terms with the Airport resulting in XL426 being towed back into Hangar 6 on 15 October 2022 following an extensive refurbishment of the space carried out and funded by Vulcan Restoration Trust volunteers.

== Operators ==
United Kingdom

- Royal Air Force
  - No. 27 Squadron RAF
  - No. 50 Squadron RAF
  - No. 83 Squadron RAF
  - No. 617 Squadron RAF
  - No. 230 Operational Conversion Unit RAF
  - Vulcan Display Flight
- Vulcan Restoration Trust
