= Vulcan Display Flight RAF =

Unit of the Royal Air Force from 1984 to 1993

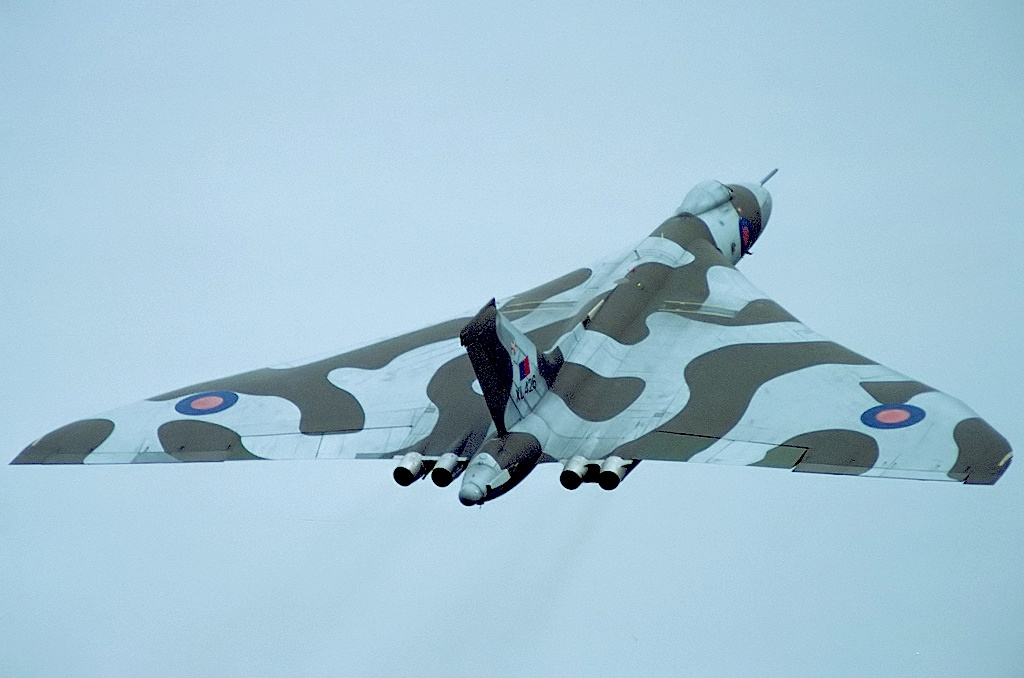
XL426 at RAF Mildenhall in May 1985

The Vulcan Display Flight (VDF) was a unit of the Royal Air Force formed in 1984 to continue to perform display flights of the Avro Vulcan bomber, which was withdrawn from active service that same year. It operated XL426 from 1984 to 1986 and XH558 from 1985 to 1993. It was disbanded in 1993, due to defence cuts.

== History ==
Prior to the formation of the VDF, various Vulcans were publicly displayed by operational RAF squadrons as part of their normal duties. Since the Vulcan had been a popular performer, it was decided after the disbandment of the last operational Vulcan unit, 50 Squadron, to set up the VDF to continue display flying. The first display, performed using XL426, was for IX Squadron's Standard Presentation Parade at RAF Honington on 23 May 1984. Over 50 displays were then completed using XL426 for the 1984 season.

As a result of budget cuts, it was decided by the Ministry of Defence to discontinue the VDF, as it couldn't justify the cost of maintaining a single aircraft type simply for display purposes. The final flight, performed using XH558, was at RAF Cranfield on 20 September 1992.

== Operations ==
The Vulcan Display Team (VDT) was a volunteer unit, with the aircraft based at RAF Waddington but with 55 Squadron, a Victor tanker unit based at RAF Marham, being their parent unit. To avoid disputes between squadrons, the VDF's Vulcans flew with the Black Panther insignia of No. 1 Group RAF, the same device worn when Vulcans were posted overseas on exercises.

== Aircraft ==
The VDT was initially allocated the aircraft XL426, with XH560 held in reserve. XL426 was one of the last three Vulcans to be in bomber configuration in active RAF service, having been retained as training aircraft for the Vulcan tankers of 50 Squadron. With XL426's flying hours running out, it was decided in the first year of displays to replace it with XH560, although after it was discovered that XH558 had more flying hours, it was chosen instead. The already withdrawn XH558 had been at Marham for spares recovery prior to eventual disposal. A former tanker, XH558 was converted back into bomber configuration at Waddington and made its display debut at the TVS Airshow in Bournemouth in May 1985. XL426 also continued to display until a final appearance at RAF Coningsby Open Day on 14 June 1986.

XL426 was sold to the Vulcan Restoration Trust based at Southend Airport (where it remains as a taxiable aircraft), being delivered on 19 December 1986. After the disbandment, XH558 was also sold for preservation, being delivered to Bruntingthorpe Aerodrome in Leicestershire on 23 March 1993. It was eventually returned to flight in 2007 and was displayed as a civilian aircraft from the 2008 to 2015 seasons inclusive before being grounded for engineering reasons, also remaining as a taxiable aircraft at Robin Hood Airport.
