= Avro Vulcan XM655 =

One of three remaining taxiable Avro Vulcan aircraft

- Avro Vulcan XM655 preserved at Wellesbourne Mountford Airfield in 2024

General information
- Type: Avro Vulcan B.2
- Manufacturer: Avro
- Status: Preserved in taxiable condition
- Registration: G-VULC; N655AV (Both expired)
- Serial: XM655
- Total hours: 5,448.50

History
- First flight: 1964
- Last flight: 11 February 1984
- Preserved at: Wellesbourne Mountford Airfield, England

Avro Vulcan XM655 is one of three remaining taxiable Avro Vulcan strategic bombers, the other two being XH558 and XL426. XM655 is currently owned by Wellesbourne Mountford Airfield and has been maintained by the 655 Maintenance & Preservation Society since 1998, who keep the aircraft in a taxiable condition.

== History ==
XM655 was completed on 19 November 1964 and was the antepenultimate Vulcan to be built. It is the youngest surviving example and the only operable Avro Vulcan with the more powerful Bristol Olympus 301 engines. Commissioned at RAF Cottesmore in 1964, XM655 initially flew with Nos. 9, 12 and 35 Squadrons before moving to the Waddington Wing in 1967 to join Nos. 44, 50 and 101 Squadrons.

=== After service ===
In 1984, XM655 was sold to businessman Roy Jacobsen of Croydon, who intended to keep it airworthy, but the costs proved prohibitive, and the runway was too short for it to take off, so XM655 was left to deteriorate. Title of XM655 then passed to Radarmoor Ltd, the operating company of Wellesbourne Mountford Airfield, and the aircraft was registered in their name in January 1993.

After restoration work, XM655 made its first public taxi run at Wellesbourne Mountford Airfield on 16 February 1997, with another two runs later that year. Since then, XM655 made more or less annual public taxi runs, usually in June, as part of the Wellesbourne Wings and Wheels show, until 2016. At various of these events, the display of XM655 has been accompanied by flypasts by the BBMF, the Red Arrows and Avro Vulcan XH558. Events in 2017 and subsequent years were prevented by airfield development issues, and an event planned for 21 June 2020 was cancelled due to the COVID-19 pandemic. Events resumed at a smaller scale in 2021 and have since been held bi-annually in May and September, although the September 2022 event was cancelled following a runway over-run during practice. Since 2023 access to the main runway has been denied due to the runway condition and aircraft weight and only slow demonstrations on the taxiway have been possible. As a result, MaPS successfully restored the Rapid Start functionality on the aircraft to demonstrate at its events in combination with a short taxi.

XM655 was also used by the crews of XH558 as required for currency and ground training.

== Media appearances ==
XM655 has appeared in several video documentaries about the Vulcan, Falklands operations and the Royal Air Force. Usually it has been used as a stand-in for the activities that cannot be filmed at the sites or on the aircraft featured.

Programme	Company
Falklands War: Last Raid of the Nuclear Vulcans	BBC Military and War Documentary
Falklands' Most Daring Raid	Darlow Smithson Productions - Channel 4
Guy Martin: The Last Flight of the Vulcan Bomber	North One Television - Channel 4
RAF at 100 with Ewan and Colin McGregor	Lion Television - BBC
The Vulcan - RAF's 100 top Warplanes	Forces TV
Portillo's Hidden History of Britain - Countdown to WW3	Transparent Television, Argonon, for Channel 5 Television

== Operators ==
United Kingdom

- Royal Air Force
  - No. 9 Squadron RAF
  - No. 12 Squadron RAF
  - No. 35 Squadron RAF
  - No. 44 Squadron RAF
  - No. 50 Squadron RAF
  - No. 101 Squadron RAF
- XM655 Maintenance and Preservation Society

== Accidents and incidents ==
On Friday 16 September 2022, XM655 suffered a runway excursion at Wellesbourne Mountford Airfield when performing a ground run as practice for the following Sunday's public show. This was due to a faulty air speed indicator, which resulted in the aircraft remaining at full power for approximately two seconds longer than intended. This resulted in excessive speed and less distance in which to stop, and the aircraft passed beyond the end of the runway – stopping in soft ground just before the airfield perimeter which borders the B4086. The air speed indicator had been tested and found satisfactory six days before the incident, and started to work normally before the end of the run. The aircraft's brakes worked properly, but were unable to bring the aircraft to a stop with the reduced distance available.

== See also ==
- Avro Vulcan XH558
- Avro Vulcan XL426
