= Robert Hall (journalist) =

Special Correspondent for the BBC

Robert Hall is a special correspondent for the BBC. As well as being a correspondent, since 2009 he is an occasional relief presenter of the BBC News Channel, mainly covering the weekend shifts. He had previously worked at ITN and Yorkshire Television as a reporter on the evening news programme Calendar. He started his career as a reporter and presenter at Channel Television in Guernsey, Channel Islands in 1977.
