= Wellesbourne Mountford Airfield =

Airfield in Wellesbourne, Warwickshire, England

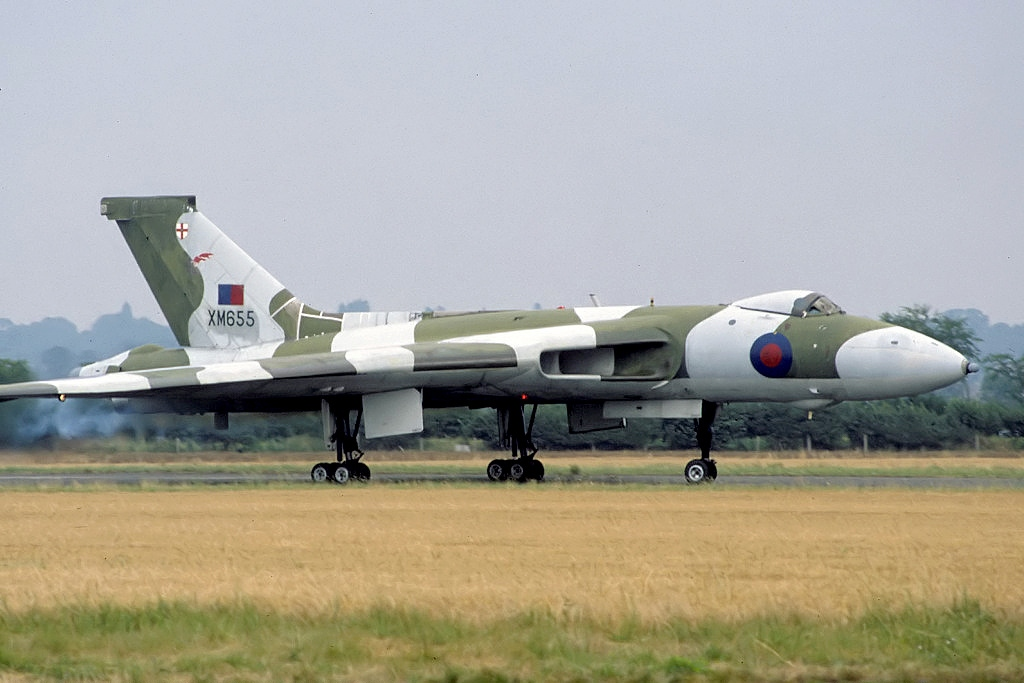
- Avro Vulcan XM655 is located at the airfleld.
- IATA: none; ICAO: EGBW

Summary
- Airport type: Private
- Operator: Radarmoor Ltd
- Location: Wellesbourne, Warwickshire
- Elevation AMSL: 157 ft (48 m)
- Coordinates: 52°11′32″N 001°36′52″W
- Website: www.wellesbourneairfield.com

Map
- Location in Warwickshire

Runways
Direction	Length		Surface
Direction	m	ft	Surface
05/23	587	1,926	Asphalt
18/36	917	3,009	Asphalt
18/36	506	1,660	Grass (Unlicensed)
- Sources: UK AIP at NATS.

Wellesbourne Mountford Airfield (ICAO: EGBW) is located in Wellesbourne, Warwickshire, England, 3.9 miles (6.3 km) east of Stratford-upon-Avon. The airfield was formerly the Royal Air Force station RAF Wellesbourne Mountford.

Wellesbourne Mountford is best known for its role in the Second World War, when it was under control by RAF Bomber Command as an Operational Training Unit training crews from within the commonwealth and other countries.

Today the airfield has a CAA Ordinary Licence (Number P681) that allows flights for the public transport of passengers or for flying instruction as authorised by the licencee (Radarmoor Limited). It is primarily a general aviation (GA) airfield. Wellesbourne Mountford is also home to Avro Vulcan XM655, which is kept in taxiable condition.

== History of the airfield ==
=== Royal Air Force ===
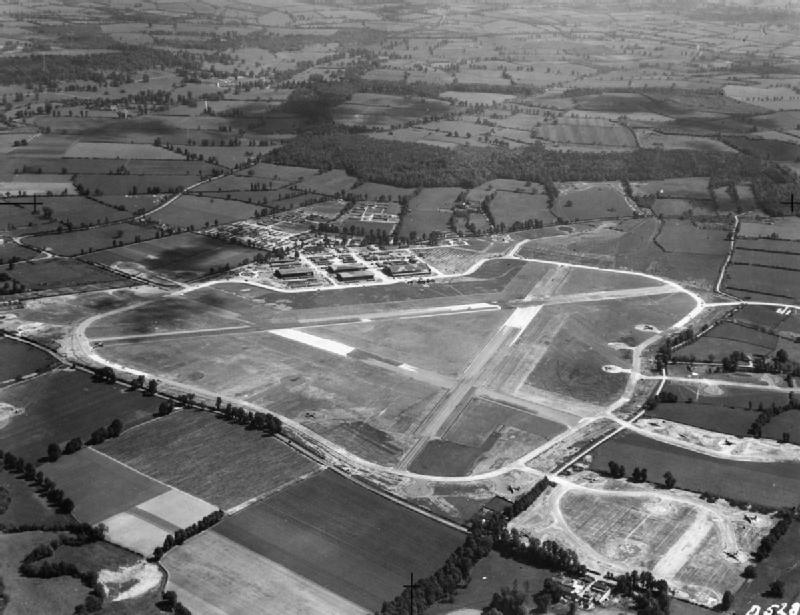
RAF Wellesbourne Mountford seen from north-north-west circa 1941-1942

The airfield was originally opened in 1941, constructed in the typical Class A airfield design, the main unit to use the airfield was No. 22 Operational Training Unit RAF which flew Vickers Wellingtons and Avro Ansons for RAF Bomber Command from 14 April 1941 until 24 July 1945.

During the Second World War the airfield was attacked several times by enemy bombers on their way home after bombing targets in the Midlands such as Coventry and Birmingham. The nearby Ettington railway station was used to transport troops and munitions from the rest of the country then to the airfield using RAF lorries and buses. Crews also attacked a number of German cities such as Cologne, Essen and Bremen as part of the 1,000 bomber raids. The aircraft were crewed by instructors and students with some planes failing to return.

The airfield was briefly home to the No. 3 Glider Training School which started using Wellesbourne Mountford during July 1945 preparing for war in the far east using the General Aircraft Hotspur before being disbanded on 3 December 1947, No. 9 Advanced Flying Training School from 1951 to 1954 with Airspeed Oxford's, North American Harvard's and de Havilland Canada DHC-1 Chipmunk's, the RAF School of Photography from 1948 to 1963 with Anson's, the RAF School of Education 1950 to 1952 and the Airfield Construction Branch from 1951 to 1964. In 1964 the airfield was closed and put on a care and maintenance basis due to the local flying pattern being too close to the V bomber force at RAF Gaydon around 4 miles (6.4 km) to the east, then returned to the original owners.

=== Civilian use ===
The airfield has been reduced in size following the closure of the RAF station with a large number of the pan dispersals and dispersal track being removed in the 1970s for civilian construction projects and with the removal of one runway (which is now a concrete taxiway) and the shortened length of another. In the past, Wellesbourne was temporarily home to Air Atlantique Douglas DC-3s between 1965 and 1981 also the site was used for vehicle testing by the Rootes Group, Coventry and a number of different groups occupied the site for uses like microlighting.

== Current use ==
Today the airfield has a CAA Ordinary Licence (Number P681) that allows flights for the public transport of passengers or for flying instruction as authorised by the licencee (Radarmoor Limited).

Wellesbourne Mountford also has an annual wings and wheels event where military and classic cars meet with various aircraft including the in-house Avro Vulcan bomber XM655.

The airfield holds a large market held on Saturdays and Bank Holidays on the eastern side. The airfield also has a café and a number of flying schools located near to the control tower.

The airfield is currently under threat from developers who want to build 1,600 homes on the site.

== Accidents and incidents ==
On 14 January 1942 a Vickers Wellington Mk 1C (DV481) from Wellesbourne stalled and crashed north of the airfield, near Charlecote, due to instrument failure during night-training. All five crew, one from the Royal Air Force, two from the Royal Canadian Air Force and two from the Royal Air Force Volunteer Reserve were killed.

In 2010 a small plane crashed on the A429 near to the airfield. The aeroplane was doing circuits around the airfield.

On Tuesday 6 August 2013 a two-seater Van's Aircraft RV-9 diesel powered aircraft suffered an engine failure shortly after take-off. The pilot executed a forced landing into a nearby field (near Loxley) which resulted in the aircraft smashing through a hedgerow and inverting. The pilot, who was 59 and had 10 years flying experience, was trapped for 40 minutes whilst emergency services tried to locate the crash site. The pilot escaped with just a "bloody thumb".

On Friday 16 September 2022, XM655 (piloted by Wing Cdr Mike Pollitt) suffered a runway excursion when performing a ground run as practice for the following Sunday's public show. This was due to a faulty air speed indicator, which resulted in the aircraft remaining at full power for approximately 2 seconds longer than intended. This resulted in excessive speed and less distance in which to stop, and the aircraft passed beyond the end of the runway – stopping just before the airfield perimeter which borders the B4086. The air speed indicator had been tested and found satisfactory six days before the incident, which had started to work normally before the end of the run. The aircraft's brakes worked properly but were unable to bring the aircraft to a stop with the reduced space available.

== Wellesbourne Wartime Museum ==
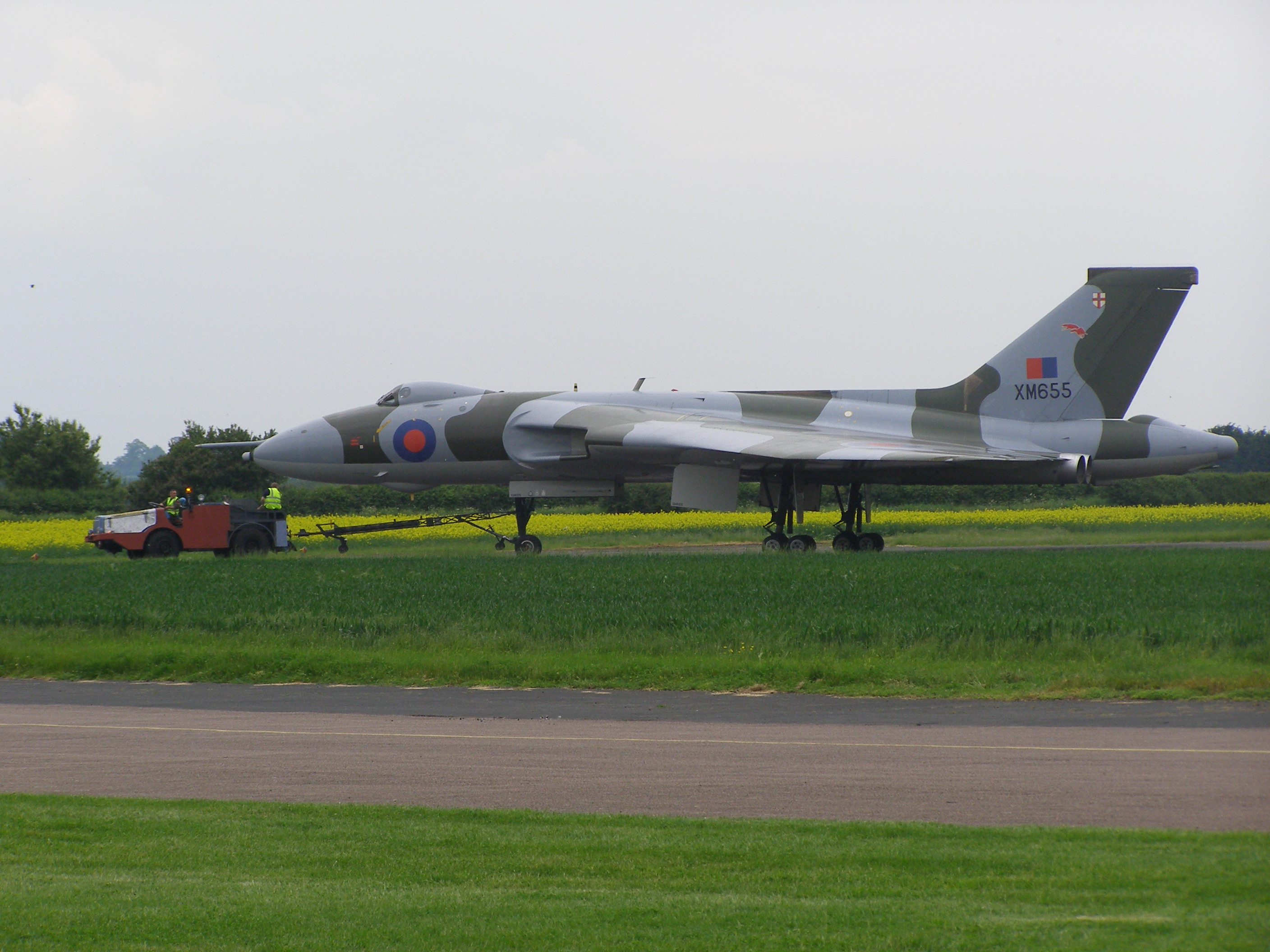
Avro Vulcan XM655 at Wellesbourne Mountford Airfield

The airfield is also home to the Wellesbourne Wartime Museum situated at the end of the car park near to the control tower which includes the Avro Vulcan XM655 which is located separately in the northwest corner of the airfield and maintained by the 655 Maintenance & Preservation Society.

=== Current museum exhibits ===
Exhibit	Manufacturer	Type	Serial	Notes
Aeroplane	de Havilland	D.H.110 Sea Vixen FAW.2	XJ575	Cockpit only
Aeroplane	de Havilland	D.H.115 Vampire T.11	XK590	
Aeroplane	Percival	P.56 Provost T.1	WV679	
Aeroplane	Yakovlev	Yak-52	RA-01378	
Engine	Rolls-Royce	Merlin Mk.22		Recovered from crash site of Avro Lancaster Mk.1 R5846

== Fixed-base operators ==
- Aeros Flight Training
- Heli Air
- On-Track Aviation
- South Warwickshire Flying School
