= Operation Market Garden order of battle =

Military units involved in Operation Market Garden

This is the complete order of battle of Allied and German forces involved during Operation Market Garden.

== Allied forces ==
US General Dwight D. Eisenhower was Supreme Commander of the Supreme Headquarters Allied Expeditionary Forces (SHAEF) and in that capacity was ultimately responsible for the planning and execution of the whole operation. British Air Chief Marshal Sir Arthur Tedder was his deputy, while Major General Walter Bedell Smith was chief of staff.

British Field Marshal Bernard Montgomery was in charge of the 21st Army Group which included all the ground forces in the operation. Montgomery was also the chief advocate for Market Garden having been directed by SHAEF ‘to plan and direct the employment of the entire Airborne force’.

=== First Allied Airborne Army ===
Commanded by Lieutenant General Lewis H. Brereton, USAAF

==== British I Airborne Corps ====
Lieutenant-General Frederick Browning; also deputy commander of the 1st Airborne Army

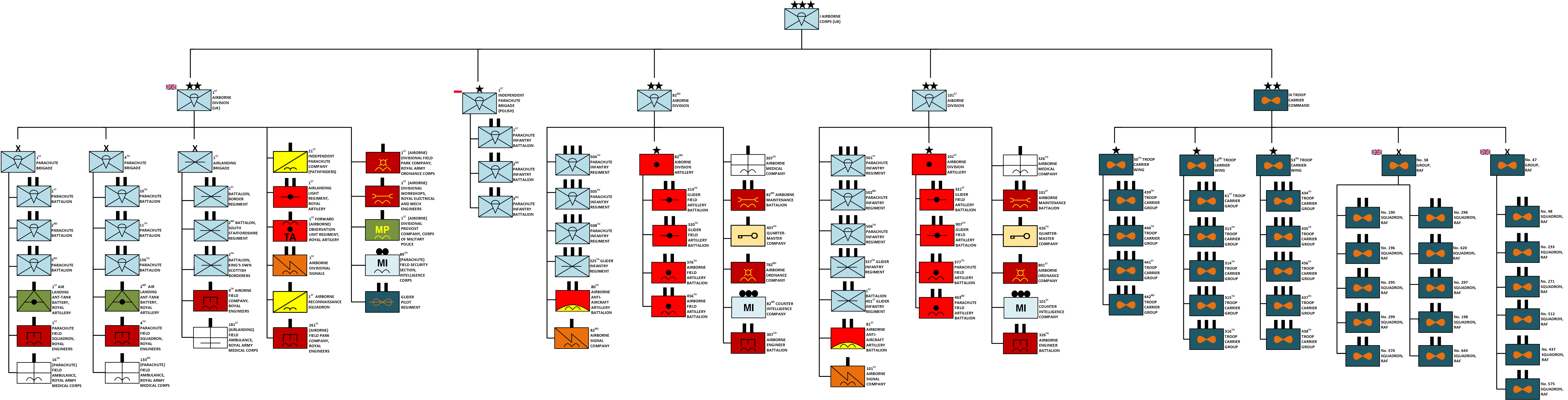
Organization of I Airborne Corps during Operation Market Garden

1st Airborne Division, Major-General Roy Urquhart

- 1st Parachute Brigade, Brigadier Gerald Lathbury
  - 1st Parachute Battalion, Lieutenant-Colonel David T. Dobie
  - 2nd Parachute Battalion, Lieutenant-Colonel John Frost
  - 3rd Parachute Battalion, Lieutenant-Colonel John A.C. Fitch
- 4th Parachute Brigade, Brigadier John W. Hackett
  - 10th Parachute Battalion, Lieutenant-Colonel Kenneth B.I. Smyth
  - 11th Parachute Battalion, Lieutenant-Colonel George H. Lea
  - 156th Parachute Battalion, Lieutenant-Colonel Sir Richard de Bacquencourt Des Voeux (KIA September 1944)
- 1st Airlanding Brigade, Brigadier Philip Hicks
  - 1st Battalion Border Regiment, Lieutenant-Colonel Thomas Haddon
  - 2nd Battalion South Staffordshire Regiment, Lieutenant-Colonel W. Derek H. McCardie
  - 7th Battalion King's Own Scottish Borderers, Lieutenant-Colonel Robert Payton-Reid
- 1st Airborne Reconnaissance Squadron, Major Charles Frederick Gough
- 21st Independent Parachute Company (Pathfinders), Major Bernard Wilson
- 1st Airborne Divisional Signals, Lieutenant-Colonel Thomas G.V. Stephenson
- 1st (Airborne) Divisional Provost Company, Corps of Military Police, Captain William B. Gray
- 89th (Parachute) Field Security Section, Intelligence Corps, Captain John Killick
- Royal Artillery, Lieutenant-Colonel R.G. Loder-Symonds
  - 1st Airlanding Light Regiment, Lieutenant-Colonel William F.K. Thompson
  - 1st Airlanding Anti-Tank Battery, Major William F. Arnold
  - 2nd Airlanding Anti-Tank Battery, Major A.F. Haynes
  - 1st Forward (Airborne) Observation Unit, Major Denys R. Wight-Boycott
- Royal Engineers, Lieutenant-Colonel E.C.W. Myers
  - 1st Parachute Field Squadron, Major Douglas C. Murray then Captain Eric Mackay
  - 4th Parachute Field Squadron, Major Aeneas Perkins
  - 9th Airborne Field Company, Major John C. Winchester
  - 261st (Airborne) Field Park Company, Lieutenant William H. Skinner
- Royal Army Service Corps, Lieutenant-Colonel M. St. John Packe
  - 250th (Airborne) Light Composite Company, Major D.G. Clarke
- Royal Army Ordnance Corps, Lieutenant-Colonel G.A. Mobbs
  - 1st (Airborne) Divisional Field Park, Major Cecil Cyril Chidgey
- Royal Electrical and Mechanical Engineers
  - 1st (Airborne) Divisional Workshops, Major Jack Carrick
- Royal Army Medical Corps, Colonel Graeme M. Warrack
  - 16th (Parachute) Field Ambulance, Royal Army Medical Corps, Lieutenant-Colonel E. Townsend
  - 133rd (Parachute) Field Ambulance, Royal Army Medical Corps, Lieutenant-Colonel W.C. Alford
  - 163rd Field Ambulance, Lieutenant-Colonel Martin E.M. Herford
  - 181st (Airlanding) Field Ambulance, Royal Army Medical Corps, Lieutenant-Colonel Arthur T. Marrable
- Glider Pilot Regiment, Lieutenant-Colonel George Chatterton
  - No.1 Wing, Lieutenant-Colonel Iain Murray
  - No.2 Wing, Lieutenant-Colonel John Place

Polish 1st Independent Parachute Brigade, Brigadier-General Stanisław Sosabowski (arrived September 21st)

- 1st Parachute Infantry Battalion, Lieutenant-Colonel M. Tonn
- 2nd Parachute Infantry Battalion, Lieutenant-Colonel W. Ploszewski
- 3rd Parachute Infantry Battalion, Major W. Sobocinski
- Light Artillery Battery, Major J. Bielecki
- Anti-Tank Battery, Capt. J. K. Wardzala
- Engineers Company, Captain B.B. Budziszewski
- Medical Company, Lieutenant J. Moździerz
- Signals Company, Lieutenant-Colonel. W. D. Tucker

82nd Airborne Division, Brigadier General James M. Gavin

- 504th Parachute Infantry Regiment, Colonel Reuben H. Tucker
  - 1st Battalion, 504th PIR, Lieutenant Colonel John T. Berry
  - 2nd Battalion, 504th PIR, Lieutenant Colonel Edward Wellems
  - 3rd Battalion, 504th PIR, Lieutenant Colonel Julian Cook
- 505th Parachute Infantry Regiment, Colonel William E. Ekman
  - 1st Battalion, 505th PIR, Major Talton Long
  - 2nd Battalion, 505th PIR, Lieutenant Colonel Benjamin Vandervoort
  - 3rd Battalion, 505th PIR, Major James, Lieutenant Colonel Ed Krause
- 508th Parachute Infantry Regiment - Colonel Roy E. Lindquist
  - 1st Battalion, 508th PIR, Lieutenant Colonel Shields Warren
  - 2nd Battalion, 508th PIR, Lieutenant Colonel Thomas Shanley, Major Otho Holmes
  - 3rd Battalion, 508th PIR, Lieutenant Colonel Louis G. Mendez Jr.
- 325th Glider Infantry Regiment, Colonel Charles Billingslea (arrived September 23rd)
  - 1st Battalion, 325th GIR, Lieutenant Colonel R. Klemm Boyd, Lieutenant Colonel Teddy Sanford
  - 2nd Battalion, 325th GIR, Major Charles T. Major
  - 2nd Battalion, 401st GIR, Major Osmund A. Leahy
- Divisional Artillery, Colonel Francis A. March
  - 319th Glider Field Artillery Battalion, Lieutenant Colonel J. Carter Todd
  - 320th Glider Field Artillery Battalion, Lieutenant Colonel Paul Wright
  - 376th Parachute Field Artillery Battalion, Lieutenant Colonel Wilbur Griffith
  - 456th Parachute Field Artillery Battalion, Lieutenant Colonel Wagner d’Allessio
- 80th Airborne Antiaircraft Battalion, Lieutenant Colonel Raymond Singleton
- 307th Airborne Engineer Battalion, Lieutenant Colonel Edwin Bedell
- 307th Airborne Medical Company, Major Jerry J. Belden
- 82nd Airborne Signal Company, Lieutenant Colonel J. Mohrmann
- 82nd Counter Intelligence Corps Detachment
- 782nd Airborne Ordnance Maintenance Company
- 407th Airborne Quartermaster Company

101st Airborne Division, Major General Maxwell D. Taylor

- 501st Parachute Infantry Regiment, Colonel Howard R. Johnson
  - 1st Battalion, 501st PIR, Lieutenant Colonel Harry W.O. Kinnard
  - 2nd Battalion, 501st PIR, Lieutenant Colonel Robert A. Ballard
  - 3rd Battalion, 501st PIR, Lieutenant Colonel Julian Ewell
- 502nd Parachute Infantry Regiment, Lieutenant Colonel John H. Michaelis
  - 1st Battalion, 502nd PIR, Lieutenant Colonel Patrick F. Cassidy
  - 2nd Battalion, 502nd PIR, Lieutenant Colonel Steven A. Chapuis, Lieutenant Colonel Elbridge Chapman
  - 3rd Battalion, 502nd PIR, Lieutenant Colonel Robert G. Cole (KIA September 18th)
- 506th Parachute Infantry Regiment, Colonel Robert F. Sink
  - 1st Battalion, 506th PIR, Lieutenant Colonel Robert Harwick, James L. LaPrade
  - 2nd Battalion, 506th PIR, Lieutenant Colonel Robert Strayer
  - 3rd Battalion, 506th PIR, Lieutenant Colonel Oliver M. Horton, Lloyd E. Patch
- 327th Glider Infantry Regiment, Colonel Joseph H. Harper
  - 1st Battalion, 327th GIR, Lieutenant Colonel Hartford T. Sallee
  - 2nd Battalion, 327th GIR, Lieutenant Colonel Thomas J. Rouzie
  - 1st Battalion, 401st Glider Infantry Regiment, Lieutenant Colonel Roy C. Allen
- Divisional Artillery, Brigadier General Anthony McAuliffe
  - 321st Glider Field Artillery Battalion, Lieutenant Colonel Edward Carmichael
  - 377th Parachute Field Artillery Battalion, Lieutenant Colonel Harry Elkins
  - 907th Glider Field Artillery Battalion, Lieutenant Colonel Clarence Nelson
- 81st Airborne Antiaircraft Battalion, Lieutenant Colonel X.B. Cox, Jr.
- 326th Airborne Engineer Battalion, Lieutenant Colonel Hugh Mozley, Lieutenant Colonel John Pappas
- 326th Airborne Medical Company, Major William E. Barfield
- 101st Airborne Signal Company, Lieutenant Colonel Sidney S. Davis
- 101st Counter Intelligence Corps Detachment
- 801st Airborne Ordnance Maintenance Company, Lieutenant Colonel Roger W. Parkinson
- 426th Airborne Quartermaster Company, Major Charles J. Rich

=== 21st Army Group ===
Commanded by Field Marshal Sir Bernard L. Montgomery

==== British Second Army ====
Commanded by Lieutenant-General Miles Dempsey

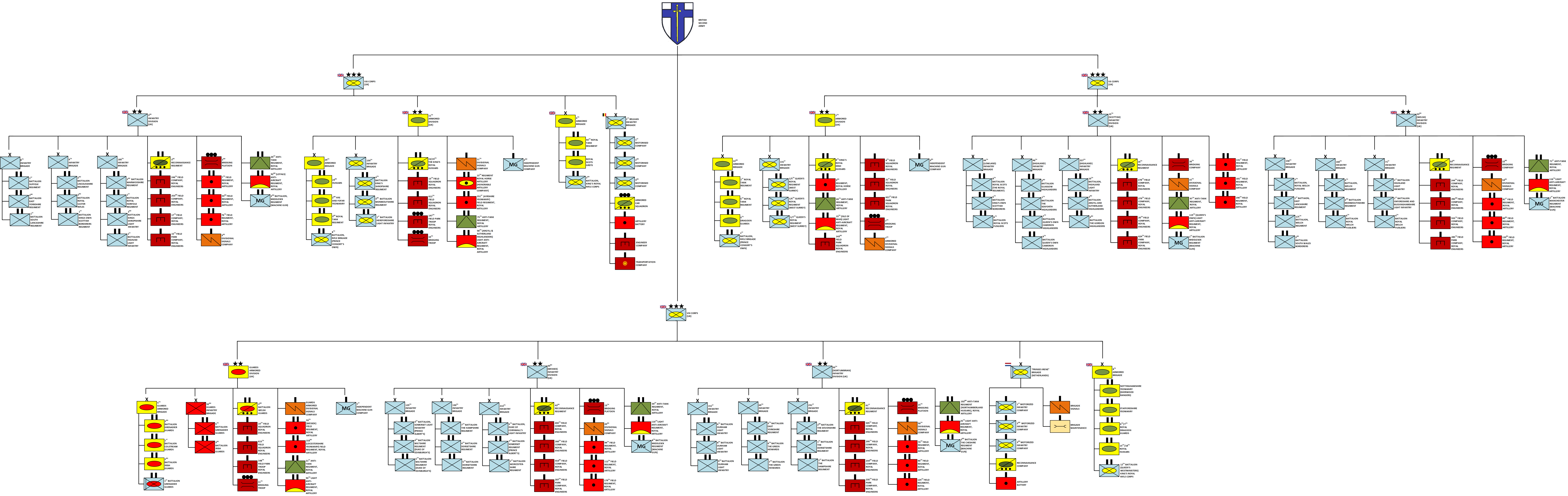
Organization of the British Second Army during Operation Market Garden during the Second World War.

===== VIII Corps =====
Lieutenant-General Richard O'Connor

11th Armoured Division, Major-General G. P. B. Roberts

- 29th Armored Brigade, Brigadier C. B. C. Harvey
  - 23rd Hussars
  - 2nd Fife and Forfar Yeomanry
  - 3rd Royal Tank Regiment, Lieutenant Colonel A.W. Brown (KIA 25 September 1944)
  - 8th Battalion, Rifle Brigade (Prince Consort's Own)
- 159th Infantry Brigade, Brigadier J. B. Chucher
  - 1st Battalion, Herefordshire Regiment
  - 3rd Battalion, Monmouthshire Regiment, Lieutenant Colonel Hubert Gerald Orr (KIA 25 September 1944)
  - 4th Battalion, King's Shropshire Light Infantry, Lieutenant Colonel Max Robinson
- 15th/19th The King's Royal Hussars
- 2nd Company, Royal Northumberland Fusiliers
- Royal Artillery
  - 13th Regiment Royal Horse Artillery
  - 151st Field Regiment
  - 75th Anti-Tank Regiment
  - 58th Light AA Regiment
- Royal Engineers
  - 13th Field Squadron
  - 612th Field Squadron
  - 10th Bridging Troop
  - 147th Field Park Squadron
- Royal Army Service Corps
  - 29th Armoured Brigade Company
  - 159th Infantry Brigade Company
  - Divisional Transport Company
- Royal Army Ordnance Corps
  - Ordnance Field Park
- Royal Electrical and Mechanical Engineers
  - 29th Armoured Brigade Workshop
  - 159th Infantry Brigade Workshop
- Royal Army Medical Corps
  - 18th Light Field Ambulance
  - 179th Light Field Ambulance
  - 7th Field Dressing Station
  - Field Hygiene Section
- Divisional Signals
- Divisional Provost Company
- Divisional Troops Company
- 270th Forward Delivery Squadron, Royal Armoured Corps

3rd Infantry Division, Major-General L. G. Whistler

- 8th Infantry Brigade, Brigadier E. E. Cass
  - 1st Battalion, South Lancashire Regiment
  - 1st Battalion, Suffolk Regiment
  - 2nd Battalion, East Yorkshire Regiment
- 9th Infantry Brigade, Brigadier G. D. Browne
  - 1st Battalion, King's Own Scottish Borderers
  - 2nd Battalion, Lancashire Regiment
  - 2nd Battalion, Royal Ulster Rifles
- 185th Infantry Brigade, Brigadier Eric Bols
  - 1st Battalion, Royal Norfolk Regiment
  - 2nd Battalion, King's Shropshire Light Infantry
  - 2nd Battalion, Royal Warwickshire Regiment
- 3rd Recce Regiment, Royal Northumberland Fusiliers
- 2nd Battalion, Middlesex Regiment
- Royal Artillery
  - 131st Field Regiment
  - 181st Field Regiment, Lieutenant-Colonel R.B.W. Bethell, DSO
  - 190th Field Regiment
  - 97th Anti-Tank Regiment
  - 119th Light AA Regiment
- Royal Engineers
  - 246th Field Company
  - 253rd Field Company
  - 17th Field Company
  - 2nd Bridging Platoon
  - 15th Field Park Company
- Royal Army Service Corps
  - 23rd Field Company
  - 47th Field Company
  - 48th Field Company
- Royal Army Ordnance Corps
  - 3rd Ordnance Field Park
- Royal Electrical and Mechanical Engineers
  - 8th Infantry Brigade Workshop
  - 9th Infantry Brigade Workshop
  - 185th Infantry Brigade Workshop
- Royal Army Medical Corps
  - 8th Field Ambulance
  - 9th Field Ambulance
  - 223rd Field Ambulance
  - 10th Field Dressing Station
  - 11th Field Dressing Station
- 3rd Divisional Provost Company
- 172nd Divisional Company
- 3rd Divisional Signals

49th (West Riding) Infantry Division, Lieutenant-General Evelyn Barker (not committed to the fighting, did not arrive in area until 21 September 1944)

- 4th Armoured Brigade - Brigadier R. M. P. Carver
  - 2nd Battalion, King's Royal Rifle Corps
  - 3rd/4th County of London Yeomanry
  - 44th Royal Tank Regiment
  - 4th Regiment Royal Horse Artillery, Royal Artillery
  - Royal Scots Greys
  - 4th Regiment Royal Horse Artillery, RA
  - 5th Field Company, RASC
  - 4th Armoured Brigade Ordnance Field Park, RAOC
  - 4th Armoured Brigade Workshop, REME
  - 14th Light Field Ambulance, RAMC
  - 271st Forward Delivery Squadron, RAC

1st Belgian Infantry Brigade, Colonel Jean-Baptiste Piron

- 1st Belgian Independent Motorised Fighting Group, Major Wintergroen
- 2nd Belgian Independent Motorised Fighting Group, Major R. Waterloos
- 3rd Belgian Independent Motorised Fighting Group, Major L. Nowe
- 1st Belgian Armoured Car Squadron, Major B.E.M. de Solliers de Moranville
- 1st Belgian Engineer Field Company, Captain R. Smekens
- 1st Belgian/Luxembourg Field Artillery Battery, Lieutenant-Colonel B. de Ridder
- Brigade Maintenance
- Brigade Signals
- Anti-Aircraft Section

===== XII Corps =====
Lieutenant-General Neil Ritchie

7th Armoured Division Major-General G. L. Verney

- 22nd Armoured Brigade, Brigadier H. T. B. Cracroft
  - 1st (Motor) Battalion, The Rifle Brigade
  - 1st Royal Tank Regiment
  - 5th Royal Inniskilling Dragoon Guards
  - 5th Royal Tank Regiment
- 131st Infantry Brigade, Brigadier Ernest Cecil Pepper
  - 1/5 Battalion, Queen's Royal Regiment
  - 1/6 Battalion, Queen's Royal Regiment
  - 1/7 Battalion, Queen's Royal Regiment
- 8th King's Royal Irish Hussars, Lieutenant Colonel Cuthbert Goulborn
- 3rd Company, Royal Northumberland Fusiliers
- Royal Artillery
  - 3rd Regiment Royal Horse Artillery
  - 5th Regiment Royal Horse Artillery
  - 65th Anti-Tank Regiment
  - 15th Light AA Regiment
- Royal Engineers
  - 4th Field Squadron
  - 621st Field Squadron
  - 7th Bridging Troop
  - 143rd Field Park Squadron
- Royal Army Service Corps
  - 58th Armoured Brigade Company
  - 67th Infantry Brigade Company
  - 507th Transport Company
- Royal Army Ordnance Corps
  - 22nd Armoured Brigade Ordnance Field Park
  - 131st Infantry Brigade Ordnance Field Park
- Royal Electrical and Mechanical Engineers
  - 22nd Armoured Brigade Workshop
  - 131st Infantry Brigade Workshop
- Royal Army Medical Corps
  - 131st Field Ambulance
  - 2nd Light Field Ambulance
  - 29th Field Dressing Station
  - 70th Field Hygiene Section
  - 134th Mobile Dental Unit
- Divisional Signals
- Divisional Provost Company
- 507th Divisional Troops Company
- 263rd Forward Delivery Squadron, Royal Armoured Corps

15th (Scottish) Infantry Division, Major-General C. M. Barber

- 44th Infantry Brigade, Brigadier J. C. Cockburn
  - 6th Battalion, Royal Scots Fusiliers
  - 6th Kings Own Scottish Borderers
  - 8th Battalion, Royal Scots
- 46th Infantry Brigade, Brigadier R. M. Villiers
  - 2nd Battalion, Glasgow Highlanders
  - 7th Battalion, Seaforth Highlanders
  - 9th Battalion, Cameronians
- 227th Infantry Brigade, Brigadier E. C. Colville
  - 10th Battalion, Highland Light Infantry
  - 2nd Battalion, Argyll and Sutherland Highlanders
  - 2nd Battalion, Gordon Highlanders
- 15th Scottish Reconnaissance Regiment, Lieutenant Colonel J.A. Grant-Peterkin, then on 23 September 1944 Lieutenant Colonel K.C.C. Smith
- 1st Battalion, Middlesex Regiment
- Royal Artillery
  - 131st Field Regiment
  - 181st Field Regiment
  - 190th Field Regiment
  - 97th Anti-Tank Regiment
  - 119th Light AA Regiment
- Royal Engineers
  - 20th Field Company
  - 278th Field Company
  - 279th Field Company
  - 26th Bridging Platoon
  - 624th Field Park Company
- Royal Army Service Corps
  - 283rd Field Company
  - 284th Field Company
  - 399th Field Company
- Royal Army Ordnance Corps
  - 15th Ordnance Field Park
- Royal Electrical and Mechanical Engineers
  - 44th Infantry Brigade Workshop
  - 46th Infantry Brigade Workshop
  - 227th Infantry Brigade Workshop
- Royal Army Medical Corps
  - 153rd Field Ambulance
  - 193rd Field Ambulance
  - 194th Field Ambulance
  - 22nd Field Dressing Station
  - 23rd Field Dressing Station
  - 40th Field Hygiene Section
- 15th Divisional Signals
- 62nd Divisional Company
- 15th Divisional Provost Company

53rd (Welsh) Infantry Division - Major-General R. K. Ross

- 71st Infantry Brigade, Brigadier V. Bromfield
  - 1st Battalion, Highland Light Infantry
  - 1st Battalion, Oxford and Bucks Light Infantry
  - 4th Battalion, Royal Welch Fusiliers
- 158th Infantry Brigade, Brigadier G.O. Sugden
  - 1/5 Battalion, Welch Regiment
  - 1st Battalion, East Lancashire Regiment
  - 7th Battalion, Royal Welch Fusiliers
- 160th Infantry Brigade, Brigadier C.F.C Coleman
  - 2nd Battalion, Monmouthshire Regiment
  - 4th Battalion, Welch Regiment
  - 6th Battalion, Royal Welch Fusiliers
- 53rd Recce Regiment
- 1st Battalion, Manchester Regiment
- Royal Artillery
  - 81st Field Regiment
  - 83rd Field Regiment
  - 133rd Field Regiment
  - 71st Anti-Tank Regiment
  - 116th Light AA Regiment
- Royal Engineers
  - 244th Field Company
  - 282nd Field Company
  - 555th Field Company
  - 22nd Bridging Platoon
  - 285th Field Park Company
- Royal Army Service Corps
  - 531st Field Company
  - 532nd Field Company
  - 533rd Field Company
- Royal Army Ordnance Corps
  - 53rd Ordnance Field Park
- Royal Electrical and Mechanical Engineers
  - 71st Infantry Brigade Workshop
  - 158th Infantry Brigade Workshop
  - 160th Infantry Brigade Workshop
- Royal Army Medical Corps
  - 147th Field Ambulance
  - 202nd Field Ambulance
  - 212th Field Ambulance
  - 13th Field Dressing Station
  - 26th Field Dressing Station
  - 53rd Field Hygiene Section
- 53rd Divisional Signals
- 501st Divisional Company
- 43rd Divisional Provost Company

===== XXX Corps =====
Lieutenant-General Brian Horrocks

Guards Armoured Division, Major-General A.H.S. Adair

- 5th Guards Armoured Brigade, Brigadier Norman Gwatkin
  - 1st Armoured Battalion, Coldstream Guards
  - 2nd Armoured Battalion, Grenadier Guards
  - 2nd Armoured Battalion, Irish Guards, Lieutenant Colonel Giles Vandeleur
  - 1st Motorised Battalion, Grenadier Guards
- 32nd Guards Brigade, Brigadier George Johnson
  - 1st Battalion, Welsh Guards
  - 5th Battalion, Coldstream Guards
  - 3rd Battalion, Irish Guards, Lieutenant Colonel J.O.E. Vandeleur
- 2nd Household Cavalry Regiment, Lieutenant Colonel H. Abel Smith
- 2nd Armoured Reconnaissance Battalion, Welsh Guards, Lieutenant Colonel J. C. Windsor-Lewis
- 1st Independent Machine Gun Company (Royal Northumberland Fusiliers)
- No. 268th Forward Delivery Squadron, RAC
- 77th Field Security Section
- Guards Armoured Divisional Signals, Royal Corps of Signals, Lieutenant Colonel W.D. Tucker
- Royal Artillery, Brigadier Herbert C. Phipps
  - 55th Field Regiment
  - 153rd Field Regiment
  - 21st Anti-Tank Regiment, Lieutenant Colonel R.C. Hulbert
  - 94th Light Anti-Aircraft Regiment
- Royal Engineers, Lieutenant Colonel, C.P. Jones
  - 14th Field Squadron
  - 615th Field Squadron
  - 148th Field Park Squadron
  - 11th Bridging Troop
- Royal Army Medical Corps, Colonel B.J. Daunt
  - 19th Light Field Ambulance, Lieutenant Colonel B.M. Nicol
  - 128th Field Ambulance, Lieutenant Colonel J.M. Scott
  - 8th Field Dressing Station
  - 60th Field Hygiene Section
- Royal Army Ordnance Corps, Lieutenant Colonel F.B.H. Villiers
  - Guards Armoured Divisional Ordnance Field Park
- Royal Army Service Corps, Lieutenant Colonel A.K. Woods
  - 224th Infantry Brigade Company
  - 310th Armoured Brigade Company
  - 535th Divisional Troops Company
  - 648th General Transport Company
- Royal Electrical and Mechanical Engineers, Lieutenant Colonel L.H. Atkinson
  - 5th Guards Brigade Workshop
  - 32nd Guards Brigade Workshop

43rd (Wessex) Infantry Division, Major-General Ivor Thomas

- 129th Infantry Brigade, Brigadier G.H.L. Luce
  - 4th Battalion, Somerset Light Infantry, Lieutenant Colonel C.G. Lipscomb
  - 4th Battalion, Wiltshire Regiment, Lieutenant Colonel E.L. Luce
  - 5th Battalion, Wiltshire Regiment, Lieutenant W.G. Roberts
- 130th Infantry Brigade, Brigadier B.B. Walton
  - 4th Battalion, Dorsetshire Regiment, Colonel Gerald Tilly
  - 5th Battalion, Dorsetshire Regiment, Lieutenant Colonel B.A. Coad
  - 7th Battalion, Hampshire Regiment, Lieutenant Colonel D.E.B. Talbot
- 214th Infantry Brigade Brigadier Hubert Essame
  - 1st Battalion, Worcestershire Regiment, Lieutenant Colonel R.E. Osborne-Smith
  - 5th Battalion, Duke of Cornwall's Light Infantry, Lieutenant Colonel George Taylor
  - 7th Battalion, Somerset Light Infantry, Lieutenant Colonel R.E. Osborne-Smith
- 43rd Reconnaissance Regiment, Lieutenant Colonel Francis Lane Fox
- 8th Battalion, Middlesex Regiment (Machine Guns)
- 43rd Divisional Signals
- 506th Divisional Company
- Royal Artillery
  - 94th Field Regiment
  - 112th Field Regiment
  - 179th Field Regiment
  - 59th Anti-Tank Regiment
  - 110th Light Anti-Aircraft Regiment
- Royal Engineers
  - 204th Field Company
  - 260th Field Company
  - 553rd Field Company
  - 207th Field Park Company
  - 13th Bridging Platoon
- Royal Army Service Corps
  - 204th Field Company
  - 260th Field Company
  - 553rd Field Company
  - 536 DUKW Company (Attached from 30 Corps 16th sep)
- Royal Electrical and Mechanical Engineers
  - 129th Infantry Brigade Workshop
  - 130th Infantry Brigade Workshop
  - 214th Infantry Brigade Workshop
- Royal Army Medical Corps
  - 129th Field Ambulance
  - 130th Field Ambulance
  - 213th Field Ambulance
  - 14th Field Dressing Station
  - 15th Field Dressing Station
  - 38th Field Dressing Station

50th (Northumbrian) Infantry Division, Major-General D. A. H. Graham; On 18 September the division was transferred to VIII Corps

- 69th Infantry Brigade, Brigadier F. Y. C. Cox
  - 5th Battalion, East Yorkshire Regiment
  - 6th Battalion, Green Howards
  - 7th Battalion, Green Howards
- 151st Infantry Brigade, Brigadier D. S. Gordon
  - 6th Battalion, Durham Light Infantry
  - 8th Battalion, Durham Light Infantry
  - 9th Battalion, Durham Light Infantry
- 231st Infantry Brigade Brigadier Sir Alexander Stanier
  - 1st Battalion, Dorsetshire Regiment
  - 1st Battalion, Hampshire Regiment
  - 7th Battalion, Devonshire Regiment
- 61st Recce Regiment
- 2nd Battalion, Cheshire Regiment (Machine Gun)
- Royal Artillery
  - 74th Field Regiment
  - 90th Field Regiment
  - 124th Field Regiment
  - 102nd Anti-Tank Regiment
  - 25th Light Anti-Aircraft Regiment
- Royal Engineers
  - 235th Field Company
  - 295th Field Company
  - 505th Field Company
  - 13th Bridging Platoon
  - 233rd Field Park Company
- Royal Army Service Corps
  - 346th Field Company
  - 508th Field Company
  - 522nd Field Company
- Royal Electrical and Mechanical Engineers
  - 69th Infantry Brigade Workshop
  - 151st Infantry Brigade Workshop
  - 231st Infantry Brigade Workshop
- Royal Army Medical Corps
  - 149th Field Ambulance
  - 186th Field Ambulance
  - 200th Field Ambulance
  - 47th Field Dressing Station
  - 48th Field Dressing Station
  - 22nd Field Hygiene Station
- 524th Divisional Company
- 50th Divisional Signals
- 19 Field Security Section, Intelligence Corps

8th Armoured Brigade, Brigadier George E. Prior-Palmer

- 4th/7th Dragoon Guards
- 13th/18th Hussars
- Sherwood Rangers Yeomanry
- 12th (Queen's Westminsters) Battalion, King's Royal Rifle Corps
- 147th Field Regiment, Royal Artillery
- 552nd Field Company, Royal Army Service Corps
- 8th Armoured Brigade Workshop, Royal Electrical and Mechanical Engineers
- 168th Light Field Ambulance, Royal Army Medical Corps

Royal Netherlands Brigade 'Prinses Irene', Colonel A. de Ruyter van Steveninck

- 1st Netherlands Independence Motorised Fighting Group, Major Paessens
- 2nd Netherlands Independence Motorised Fighting Group, Major Molenaar
- 3rd Netherlands Independence Motorised Fighting Group, Major Huber
- 1st Netherlands Reconnaissance Squadron, Captain Immink
- 1st Netherlands Field Artillery Battery

=== Air forces ===
==== Royal Air Force ====
Second Tactical Air Force - Air Marshal Sir Arthur Coningham

- No. 83 Group RAF - Air vice-marshal H. Broadhurst
  - No. 39 (Reconnaissance) Wing RCAF
  - 121, 122, 123 & 143 Wings (Typhoon)
  - 125 RAF, 126 RCAF & 127 RCAF Wings (Spitfire)
- No. 2 Group RAF - Air Vice-Marshal B. E. Embry
  - 136, 138, 140 Wings (Mosquito)
  - 137 & 139 Wings (Mitchell)
- No. 84 Group RAF - Air Vice Marshal Leslie Brown

Transport Command - Air Chief Marshal Sir Frederick Bowhill

- No. 38 Group RAF - Air Vice-Marshal Leslie Norman Hollinghurst
  - No. 190 Squadron RAF (Short Stirling IV) operating from RAF Fairford
  - No. 196 Squadron RAF (Short Stirling IV) operating from RAF Keevil
  - No. 295 Squadron RAF (Short Stirling IV) operating from RAF Harwell
  - No. 296 Squadron RAF (Armstrong Whitworth Albermale) operating from RAF Manston (forward based from RAF Brize Norton)
  - No. 297 Squadron RAF (Armstrong Whitworth Albermale) operating from RAF Manston (forward based from RAF Brize Norton)
  - No. 298 Squadron RAF (Handley Page Halifax) operating from RAF Tarrant Rushton
  - No. 299 Squadron RAF (Handley Page Halifax) operating from RAF Tarrant Rushton
  - No. 570 Squadron RAF (Short Stirling IV) operating from RAF Harwell
  - No. 620 Squadron RAF (Short Stirling IV) operating from RAF Fairford
  - No. 644 Squadron RAF (Handley Page Halifax) operating from RAF Tarrant Rushton
  - No. 6080 Light Warning Unit
  - No. 6341 Light Warning Unit
- No. 46 Group RAF - Douglas Dakota I - Acting Air Commodore (later Air Marshal Sir) Lawrence Darval
  - No. 233 Squadron RAF operating from RAF Blakehill Farm
  - No. 437 Squadron RCAF operating from RAF Blakehill Farm
  - No. 512 Squadron RAF operating from RAF Broadwell
  - No. 575 Squadron RAF operating from RAF Broadwell
  - No. 271 Squadron RAF operating from RAF Down Ampney
  - No. 48 Squadron RAF operating from RAF Down Ampney

Air Defence of Great Britain - Air Marshal Roderic Hill

Bomber Command - Air Chief Marshal Sir Arthur Harris

Coastal Command - Air Chief Marshal Sholto Douglas

==== United States Army Air Forces ====
Eighth Air Force - Lieutenant General James H. Doolittle

Ninth Air Force - Lieutenant General Hoyt Vandenberg

United States Strategic Air Forces in Europe

- IX Troop Carrier Command - Douglas C-47 Skytrain
  - 50th Troop Carrier Wing
    - 439th Troop Carrier Group - dropped the 82nd Division near Nijmegen initially
    - 440th Troop Carrier Group - dropped the 82nd Division near Groesbeek initially
    - 441st Troop Carrier Group - dropped the 82nd Division and 101st Division near Nijmegen initially
    - 442nd Troop Carrier Group
  - 52nd Troop Carrier Wing
    - 61st Troop Carrier Group - dropped the 1st Airborne Division near Arnhem initially
    - 313th Troop Carrier Group - dropped the 1st Airborne Division near Arnhem and American units near Nijmegen initially
    - 314th Troop Carrier Group
    - 315th Troop Carrier Group - dropped the 82nd Division initially, with landings at Grave for repatriations
    - 316th Troop Carrier Group
  - 53rd Troop Carrier Wing
    - 434th Troop Carrier Group - dropped the 82nd near Nijmegen initially
    - 435th Troop Carrier Group - dropped the 101st Division near the Wilhelina Canal near Eindhoven initially
    - 436th Troop Carrier Group - dropped the 101st Division initially
    - 437th Troop Carrier Group - dropped the 101st Division to Zon near Eindhoven initially
    - 438th Troop Carrier Group - dropped the 101st Division near Eindhoven initially

== German forces ==
The majority of German units stationed west of the Rhine were under the responsibility of Oberbefehlshaber West (OB West), commanded at the time by Generalfeldmarschall Gerd von Rundstedt. Due to a lack of replacements (both in terms of personnel and materiel) German units were generally severely understrength at this point in the war, with many units at about 50% of establishment strength.

=== Army Group B ===
Generalfeldmarschall Walther Model

==== German Armed Forces Group (AFC) Netherlands ====
General der Flieger Friedrich Christiansen

==== Seventh Army ====
General der Panzertruppe Erich Brandenberger

===== I. SS Panzerkorps =====
SS-Obergruppenführer Georg Keppler

- 1st SS Panzer Division “Leibstandarte SS Adolf Hitler” (remnants)
- 12th SS Panzer Division “Hitler Jugend” (remnants)
- Kampfgruppe 2nd SS Panzer Division “Das Reich”
- Kampfgruppe 2nd Panzer Division
- Kampfgruppe Division Nr. 172

===== LXXXI. Armeekorps =====
- 183rd Volksgrenadier Division
- 49. Infanterie-Division (remnants)
- 246th Volksgrenadier Division
- 12. Infanterie-Division
- 275. Infanterie-Division

===== LXXIV. Armeekorps =====
- 353. Infanterie-Division
- Kampfgruppe 347. Infanterie-Division
- 89. Infanterie-Division
- 348. Infanterie-Division (remnants)

===== LXXX. Armeekorps =====
- Kampfgruppe Hauser (Panzer-Lehr-Division (part))
- 36th Grenadier Division
- Kampfgruppe 5. Fallschirmjäger-Division

==== 1. Fallschirm-Armee ====
Colonel General Kurt Student

===== II. SS-Panzerkorps =====
SS-Obergruppenführer Wilhelm Bittrich

9. SS-Panzergrenadier-Division Hohenstaufen, SS-Standartenführer Walter Harzer

- SS-Panzer Regiment 9
  - Abteilung I
  - Abteilung II
- SS-Panzergrenadier Regiment 19
  - Bataillon I
- SS-Panzergrenadier Regiment 20
  - Bataillon I
  - Bataillon II
- SS-Panzer Artillerie Regiment 9
  - Abteilung I, SS-Obersturmbannfuhrer Ludwig Spindler
- SS-Panzer-Aufklärung-Abteilung 9, Hauptsturmführer Viktor Eberhard Gräbner
- SS-Panzerjäger-Abteilung 9, Hauptsturmfürer Klaus von Allworden
- SS-Panzer-Pionier-Abteilung 9, SS-Hauptsturmführer Hans Möller
- SS-FlaK-Abteilung 9, Obersturmfürer Gropp
- SS Pionier Lehr Abteilung 9
- SS-Feldgendarmerie-Trupp 9
- SS-Panzer-Nachrichten-Abteilung 9
- SS-Sturmgeschütz-Abteilung 9
- SS-Beobachtungs-Batterie 9
- SS-Nachschubtruppen 9
- SS-Panzer-Instandsetzungs-Abteilung 9
- SS-Wirtschafts-Battalion 9
- SS-Verwaltungstruppen-Abteilung 9
- SS-Sanitäts-Kompanien 9
- SS-Feldlazarett
- SS-Krankenkraftwagenzug 9
- SS-Feldpostamt 9
- SS-Kriegsberichter-Zug 9
- SS-Feldersatz-Battalion 9
- SS-Ausbildungs-Battalion 9

10. SS-Panzer-Division Frundsberg, SS-Gruppenführer Heinz Harmel

- SS-Panzer-Regiment 10, SS-Oberstürmbannführer Otto Paetsch
  - Abteilung I
  - Abteilung II
- SS-Panzergrenadier-Regiment 21, SS-Sturmbannführer Heinz Laubscheer
  - Bataillon I
- SS-Panzergrenadier-Regiment 22, SS-Sturmbannführer Wilhelm Schulze
  - Bataillon I
  - Bataillon II
- SS-Panzer-Artillerie-Regiment 10, SS-Sturmbannführer Hans-George Sonnenstuhl
  - Bataillon I
  - Bataillon II
  - Bataillon III
- SS-Aufklärungs Battalion 10, SS-Sturmbannführer Heinrich Brinkmann
- SS-Panzerjäger-Abteilung 10, SS-Sturmbannfuhrer Leo-Hermann Reinhold
- SS-Pionier-Abteilung 10, SS-Sturmbannführer Tröbinger
- SS-FlaK-Abteilung 10, SS-Sturmbannführer Rudolf Schrembs
- SS-Nachrichten Battalion 10, SS-Sturmbannführer Willi Kruft
- SS-Kradschützen-Regiment 10
- SS-Sturmgeschütz-Abteilung 10
- SS-Panzer-Nachrichten-Abteilung 10
- SS-Verwaltungs Truppen 10
- SS-Instandsetzungs Abteilung 10
- SS-Sanitäts-Abteilung 10
- SS-Nachschub Truppen 10
- SS-Feldpostamt 10
- SS-Kriegsberichter-Zug 10
- SS-Feldgendarmerie-Trupp 10

6th Parachute Regiment, Oberstleutnant Friedrich August Freiherr von der Heydte

- Bataillon I, Hauptmann Emil Priekschat
- Bataillon II, Hauptmann Rolf Mager
- Bataillon III, Hauptmann Horst Trebes
- Pionier Kompanie
- Panzerjäger Kompanie
- Fusilier Kompanie

Kampfgruppe "Von Tettau", Generalleutnant Hans von Tettau

- SS Unterführerschule Arnheim, SS-Standartenführer Michael Lippert
  - Bataillon I
  - Bataillon II
  - Bataillon III
- SS Polizei Schule
- SS Training and Replacement Battalion 4, Leutnant Labahn
  - Battalion 1, SS-Haüptstürmführer Günther Schulz
  - Battalion 2, SS-Sturmbannführer Eugen Eberwein
- SS Wach Battalion 3, SS-Sturmbannführer Paul Anton Helle
- Schiffsturm Abteilung 10, Kapitan Leutnant Zaubzer
- Schiffsturm Abteilung 6/14
- Fliegerhorst Battalion 2
- Fliegerhorst Battalion 3
- Artillerie Regiment 184
- Sicherheit Regiment 42

Kampfgruppe "Knoche", Major Knoche

- Sicherheit Regiment 26
  - Bataillon I
  - Bataillon II
- MG Bataillon 30
- FlaK Abteilung 688
  - Bataillon I
  - Bataillon II
- Hermann Göering Schule Regiment, Oberst Waldemar Kluge
  - Hermann Göering Schule Regiment
    - Bataillon I
  - Panzer Abteilung 224
  - SS Ersatz Abteilung 4
  - Deelen Airfield FlaK Kompanie
  - Wach Kompanie
  - Reichs AD

Kampfgruppe "Kraft", SS-Sturmbannführer Sepp Kraft

- SS Panzergrendier Bataillon 16

Schwerepanzer Abteilung 506, Major Eberhard Lange

Schwerepanzer Kompanie Hummel

StuG Abteilung 280????

Artillerie Regiment 191

- Bataillon I
- Bataillon II
- Bataillon III
- SS-Werfer Abteilung 102, Hauptsturmfürer Nickmann

Kampfgruppe "Brinkmann"

Kampfgruppe "Bruhn"

Kampfgruppe "Harder"

Sperrverband "Harzer", Gerhard

- MG Bataillon 47
- Marine Kampfgruppe 642
- Kampfgruppe "Schörken"
- Kampfgruppe "Kauer"
- SS Abteilung "Landstrum Nederland"

Kampfgruppe "Knaust", Major Knaust

- Ersatz Abteilung Bocholt
- Panzer Kompanie "Mielke"

Kampfgruppe "Spindler"

FlaK Abteilung "Swoboda"

Kampfgruppe "von Allworden", Captain Klaus von Allworden

Kampfgruppe "Weber"

- Nachrichten Abteilung 213

Sösterberg Fliegerhorst Battalion?

Kampfgruppe "Henke", A Fallschirmjager training Regiment under the command of Oberst Fritz Henke?

===== II. Fallschirm-Korps =====
General der Fallschirmtruppen Eugen Meindl

- 3rd Fallschirmjäger Division, Generalmajor Walter Wadehn
  - Fallschirmjäger-Regiment 5, Major H. Müller
    - Bataillon I
  - Fallschirmjäger-Regiment 8, Oberstleutnant Ernst Liebach
    - Bataillon I
  - Fallschirmjäger-Regiment 9, Oberst Hellmut Hoffmann
    - Bataillon I
  - Fallschirm-Artillerie-Regiment 3
    - Bataillon I
    - Bataillon II
    - Bataillon III
  - 3rd Fallschirmjäger Aufklärungs Battalion
  - Abteilung Isphording
  - Fallschirm-Flak-Abteilung 3
  - Fallschirm-Panzerjäger-Abteilung 3
  - Fallschirm-Pionier-Bataillon 3, Major Karl-Heinz Beth
- 6th Fallschirmjäger Division, Oberst Harry Hermann
  - 6th Fallschirm-Artillerie Regiment, Oberst Winkler or Major Walter-Otto Franke?
  - Fallschirm-Flak-Abteilung 6
  - Fallschirmjäger-Regiment 17, Oberst Martin Vetter?
  - Fallschirmjäger-Regiment 18, Oberst Erich Walther
  - Fallschirm-Panzerjäger-Abteilung 6
  - Fallschirm-Pionier-Bataillon 6, Major Stipschitz
- 5th Fallschirmjäger Division, Generalmajor Sebastian-Ludwig Heilmann
  - Fallschirm-Jäger-Regiment 13, Hauptmann Plodder or Oberstleutnant Achim Fehse?
    - Bataillon I
    - Bataillon II
    - Bataillon III
  - Fallschirm-Artillerie-Regiment 5, Oberst Winzer
    - Fallschirm-Flak-Abteilung 5
    - Fallschirm-Jäger-Regiment 14, Oberst Arno Schimmel?
    - Fallschirm-Jäger-Regiment 15, Oberst Kurt Gröschke?
    - Fallschirm-Panzerjäger-Abteilung 5?
    - Fallschirm-Pionier-Bataillon 5, Major Gerhard Mertins?
  - Kampfgruppe "Greshick"
    - Bataillon I
    - Bataillon II
    - Bataillon III
  - Fallschirmjäger FlaK

===== XII. SS-Armeekorps =====
SS-Obergruppenführer Curt von Gottberg

- 180th Infantry Division, Generalmajor Bernhard Klosterkemper
  - Grenadier Regiment 1221
    - Bataillon I
    - Bataillon II
  - Grenadier Regiment 1222
    - Bataillon I
    - Bataillon II
  - Grenadier Regiment 1223
    - Bataillon I
    - Bataillon II
  - Fusilier Abteilung 180
  - Artillerie Regiment 880
    - Bataillon I
    - Bataillon II
    - Bataillon III
  - Panzerjäger Kompanie 1180
  - 1180th Pionier Battalion?
- 190th Infantry Division, Generalleutnant Ernst Hammer
  - Grenadier Regiment 1224
  - Grenadier Regiment 1225
  - Grenadier Regiment 1226
  - Fusilier Battalion 190
  - Artillerie Regiment 890
    - Abteilung I
    - Abteilung II
    - Abteilung III
  - Panzerjäger Abteilung 1190
  - Pionier Bataillon 1190
  - Nachrichten Bataillon 1190
- 363rd Volkgrenadier Division, Generalleutnant Augustus Dettling
  - Grenadier Regiment 957
    - Bataillon I
    - Bataillon II
  - Grenadier Regiment 958
    - Bataillon I
    - Bataillon II
  - Grenadier Regiment 959
    - Bataillon I
    - Bataillon II
  - Fusilier Kompanie 363
  - Artillerie Regiment 363
    - Bataillon I
    - Bataillon II
    - Bataillon III
    - Bataillon IV
  - 363rd Panzerjäger Battalion?
  - 363rd Pionier Battalion?
  - Kampfgruppe Klauck?

===== LXXXVI Corps =====
General der Infanterie Hans von Obstfelder

- 176th Infantry Division, Oberst Christian-Johannes Landau
  - 1176th Panzerjäger Battalion
  - 1176th Pionier Battalion
  - 176th Fusilier Battalion
- Kampfgruppe "Walther"
- Fallschirmjäger Regiment von Hoffmann
  - Bataillon I
  - Bataillon II
  - FlaK
  - Panzerjäger Kompanie
- Luftwaffe Ersatz Abteilung
- Schwere Panzerjäger-Abteilung 559
- 107th Panzer Brigade, Major Berndt-Joachim Freiherr von Maltzahn
  - Panzer Abteilung 2107, Major Hans-Albrecht von Plüskow (KIA September 22nd)
  - Panzergrenadier Regiment 2107, Hauptmann Kurt Wild (KIA September 23rd)
  - Flakzug 2107
  - Panzerjäger Kompanie 2107
  - Panzer Pionier Kompanie 2107
- Division "Erdmann", Generalleutnant Wolfgang Erdmann (Transferred to 1st Fallschirmarmee September 4th)
  - Fallschirmjäger Regiment "Grossmehl", Oberstleutnant Grossmehl
  - Fallschirmjäger Regiment "Hübner"
  - Fallschirmjäger Regiment "Laytved-Hardegg", Oberst Laytved-Hardegg
  - Fallschirmjäger Regiment "Menzel", Oberst Günther Menzel
  - Fallschirm-Jäger-Ersatz- und Ausbildungs-Regiment Greve
  - Fallschirm-Panzer-Jäger-Abteilung Grunwald
  - Bataillon Schäfer
  - Bataillon Schluckebier
- Kampfgruppe "Heinke"
  - SS Panzergrenadier Regiment 19, Bataillon II
  - SS Panzergrenadier Regiment 21, Bataillon II
  - SS Panzerjäger Abteilung 10
  - SS Artillerie 9, Bataillon I
  - SS Artillerie 10, Bataillon I
- Kampfgruppe SS FlaK Bataillon 10

==== Fifteenth Army ====
General der Infanterie Gustav-Adolf von Zangen

===== LXXXIX. Armeekorps =====
- 64. Infanterie-Division
- 70. Infanterie-Division

===== LXVII. Armeekorps =====
General der Infanterie Otto Sponheimer

346. Infanterie-Division, Generalleutnant Erich Diestel

- Grenadier-Regiment 857
- Grenadier-Regiment 858
- Grenadier-Regiment 1018
- Füsilier-Bataillon 346
- Artillerie-Regiment 346, Hauptmann Karl-Heinz Vahrenhorst
- Pionier-Bataillon 346
- Panzerjäger-Abteilung 346
- Nachrichten-Abteilung 346
- Feldersatz-Bataillon 346
- Versorgungseinheiten 346

711. Infanterie-Division, Generalleutnant Josef Reichert

- Grenadier-Regiment 731
- Grenadier-Regiment 744
- Grenadier-Regiment 763
- Füsilier-Bataillon 1711
- Artillerie-Regiment 1711, Oberstleutnant Hermann Freiherr von Ebner
- Pionier-Bataillon 711
- Panzerjäger-Abteilung 711
- Nachrichten-Abteilung 711
- Feldersatz-Bataillon 1711
- Versorgungseinheiten 711

719. Infanterie-Division, Generalleutnant Karl Sievers - Transferred to 1st Fallschirmarmee September 4.

- Artillerie Regiment 1719
  - Bataillon I
  - Bataillon II
- Pionier Battalion 719, Major der Reserve Theodor Fleischhut
- Grenadier Regiment 723, Oberst Vehrenkamp
  - Bataillon I
  - Bataillon II
  - Bataillon III
- Grenadier Regiment 743, Oberst Bosselman
  - Bataillon I
  - Bataillon II
  - Bataillon III
- Panzerjäger-Abteilung 719
- Nachrichten-Abteilung 719
- Feldersatz-Bataillon 719
- Versorgungseinheiten 719

===== LXXXVIII. Armeekorps =====
General der Infanterie Hans-Wolfgang Reinhard

59th Infantry Division, Generalleutnant Walter Poppe

- Grenadier Regiment 1034
  - Bataillon I
  - Bataillon II
- Grenadier Regiment 1035
  - Bataillon I
  - Bataillon II
- Grenadier Regiment 1036
  - Bataillon I
  - Bataillon II
- Artillerie Regiment 159
  - Bataillon I
  - Bataillon II
  - Bataillon III
- Panzerjäger Abteilung 59
- Pionier Abteilung 59
- Fallschirmjäger-Regiment "Jungwirth"

Kampfgruppe "Rink"

- Bataillon I
- Polizei
- FlaK

Kampfgruppe "Ewald"

- Marsch Bataillon Zedlitz

245. Infanterie-Division, Generalleutnant Erwin Sande

- Infanterie Regiment 935
- Infanterie Regiment 936
- Infanterie Regiment 937
- 245th Artillerie Regiment
  - Bataillon I
  - Bataillon II
  - Bataillon III
- Fusilier Bataillon 245
- Feldersatz Bataillon 245
- Pionier Bataillon 245
- Signals Bataillon 245?
- Supply Troops?

712. Infanterie-Division, Generalleutnant Friedrich-Wilhelm Neumann

- Grenadier Regiment 732
- Grenadier Regiment 745
- 652nd Artillerie Battalion
  - Bataillon I
  - Bataillon II
- Panzerjäger Kompanie 712
- Pionier Bataillon 712
- Nachrichten Abteilung 712
- Supply Troops 712?
- 1712th Artillerie Battalion, Hauptmann Wilhelm Kratzer?

Kampfgruppe "Chill", Generalleutnant Kurt Chill

- Fallschirmjäger Regiment 2
  - Bataillon I
- Grenadier Regiment 1053
  - Bataillon I
  - Bataillon II
- Grenadier Regiment 1054
  - Bataillon I
  - Bataillon II
- Artillerie Regiment 158
  - Bataillon I
  - Bataillon II
- Panzerjäger Abteilung 85

18th Flak Brigade

=== Wehrkreis VI, Corps "Feldt" ===
General der Kavalerie Kurt Feldt

406. Landesschützen Division, Generalleutnant Gerd Scherbening

- 172nd Landesschützen Regiment?
- 183rd Landesschützen Regiment?
- 33rd Landesschützen Regiment?
- 6th Replacement and Training Battalion?
- Unteroffizier Schule Wehrkreis 6
- Unteroffizier Schule Jülich
- Unteroffizier Schule Düren
- Scharfschütze Schule 6
- Landsschützen Abteilung I./6
- Landsschützen Abeilung II./6
- Landsschützen Abteilung III./6
  - 3 Kompanie / 406 Ersatz Abteilung
- Landsschützen Abteilung B
- Landsschützen Abteilung 254
- Artillerie Abteilung 406
- Kampfgruppe Tiltma

Ersatz Abteilung 6

Magen Abteilung

Ohr Abteilung

== See also ==
- List of orders of battle
