= No. 569 Squadron RAF =

- Active: 10 January 1944 – 1 March 1944
- Country: United Kingdom
- Branch: Royal Air Force
- Role: Transport
- Part of: RAF Transport Command

No. 569 Squadron RAF was a proposed squadron of the Royal Air Force during the Second World War.

== History ==
The squadron was theoretically formed on 10 January 1944 as a transport unit within 46 Group. This group was created as a Transport Support Group and was to have 5 squadrons at 3 new bases, RAF Down Ampney, RAF Blakehill Farm and RAF Broadwell The intended squadrons were two already existing ones, Nos. 271, 512 and three new ones to be formed: Nos. 569, 575 and 597 Squadron. In the event only No. 575 Squadron was really formed, and No. 48 Squadron RAF and No. 233 Squadron RAF took the other places, though personnel under training with 512 squadron had been intended for service with No. 569 Squadron. No. 569 Squadron, like No. 597 Squadron was disbanded on 1 March 1944 before it had any aircraft or personnel.

== See also ==
- List of Royal Air Force aircraft squadrons
- RAF Transport Command
