= No. 597 Squadron RAF =

- Active: 10 January 1944 – 1 March 1944
- Country: United Kingdom
- Branch: Royal Air Force
- Role: Transport
- Part of: RAF Transport Command

No. 597 Squadron RAF was a proposed squadron of the Royal Air Force during the Second World War.

== History ==
The squadron was formed on 10 January 1944 as a transport unit within 46 Group. This group was created as a Transport Support Group and was to have five squadrons at three new bases: RAF Down Ampney (Gloucestershire), RAF Blakehill Farm (Wiltshire) and RAF Broadwell (Oxfordshire).

The intended squadrons were two already existing – Nos. 271, 512 – and three new: 569, 575 and 597. In the event only 575 Squadron was formed, while 48 Squadron and 233 Squadron took the other places, though personnel under training with 512 Squadron had been intended for service with 569 Squadron. No. 597 Squadron, like 569 Squadron, was disbanded on 1 March 1944 before it had any aircraft or personnel.

== See also ==
- List of Royal Air Force aircraft squadrons
- RAF Transport Command
