= No. 46 Group RAF =

Group command element of the Royal Air Force

- Royal Air Force Ensign
- Active: 17 January 1944 - 15 October 1949; 1 November 1949 - 31 March 1950; 1 September 1972 - 1 January 1976
- Country: United Kingdom
- Branch: Royal Air Force
- Type: Royal Air Force group
- Role: Military transport
- Part of: RAF Transport Command
- Motto(s): Alios Alis Alo (Latin for 'With my wings I nourish others')

No. 46 Group RAF was a group of the Royal Air Force.

No. 46 Group was formed on 17 January 1944 within RAF Transport Command. The Headquarters was at The Cedars, Hatch End, Middlesex and the first Air Officer Commanding No. 46 Group was Air Commodore Arthur Leonard ‘Fido’ Fiddament CB, CBE, DFC.

== History ==
No. 46 Group had been formed with five squadrons (48, 233, 271, 512 & 575 Squadrons) with the role of transport support during the D-Day landings on 6 June 1944.

The main aircraft used in No. 46 Group was the Douglas Dakota.

On 10 June 1944, two aircraft of No. 1697 (Air Despatch Letter Service) Flight, a unit of No. 46 Group equipped with modified Hawker Hurricane, a single-seat fighter aircraft, to deliver secret mail and small equipment to the Normandy beachheads, had the honor to become the first aircraft to land in France after D-Day.

After the D-Day landings, No. 46 Group flew continually between England and France in the crucial role to deliver Freight and to evacuate wounded from the fighting in Normandy.

On 4 September 1944, No. 437 Squadron RCAF was formed and it flew in the next major airborne operation, Market Garden, since its first day, on 17 September 1944.

It was on 19 September 1944 during Operation Market Garden that Flight Lieutenant David Lord VC, DFC, No. 271 Squadron RAF, lost his life and earned his Victoria Cross, the only one awarded to a member of RAF Transport Command.

Despite the heavy losses of Operation Market Garden, the six Squadrons of No. 46 Group had continued the flights between England and the frontline in Europe. The training with the allied airborne forces also never stopped and so No. 46 Group participated to the greatest airborne operation of all times in one time at one place: Operation Varsity on 24 March 1945 – The Rhine Crossing.

After Varsity, No. 46 Group returned to its usual tasks.

On 14 August 1946, No. 44 Group RAF, established in August 1941, was absorbed into No. 46 Group.

After extensive involvement in the Berlin Airlift, from June 1948 to September 1949, 46 Group disbanded on 15 October 1949 at Lüneburg Airfield (B 156), in West Germany. It was reformed on 1 November 1949 by renaming No. 47 Group RAF, but disbanded only five months afterwards, on 31 March 1950. King George VI authorised the Group's badge in February 1951 with the motto Alios Alis Alo ("With my wings I nourish others").

It was reformed on 1 September 1972 as No. 46 (Strategic Support) Group RAF, within RAF Strike Command, to take over half of the previous transport role that the disbanded RAF Air Support Command had carried out. "Early in 1972" RAF Brize Norton had come under the Group's control, at the time hosting Nos 10, 53, 99 and 511 Squadrons. RAF Lyneham was also under the Group's auspices after the war. Air Marshal Denis Crowley-Milling served as Air Officer Commanding from 3 January 1973 to 7 January 1974. It was merged into No. 38 Group RAF on 1 January 1976 and thus disbanded.

== Structure ==
- July 1944 - HQ at Harrow Weald
  - RAF Blakehill Farm = No. 233 Squadron RAF with the Dakota
  - RAF Broadwell = No. 512 Squadron RAF & No. 575 Squadron RAF with the Dakota
  - RAF Down Ampney = No. 48 Squadron RAF & No. 271 Squadron RAF with the Dakota
  - RAF Hendon = No. 1697 (Air Despatch Letter Service) Flight RAF
  - RAF Netheravon = Air Transport Tactical Development Unit RAF
- July 1945 - HQ at Hendon
  - RAF Blackbushe = No. 301 Squadron RAF with the Warwick
  - RAF Broadwell = No. 512 Squadron RAF with the Dakota
  - RAF Down Ampney = No. 48 Squadron RAF & No. 271 Squadron RAF with the Warwick
  - RAF Ibsley = No. 1333 (Transport Support) Conversion Unit RAF GPTF with the Warwick
  - RAF Leicester East = No. 1333 (Transport Support) Conversion Unit RAF with the Warwick
  - RAF Netheravon = Air Transport Tactical Development Unit RAF
  - RAF Northolt = Air Despatch Letter Service Squadron RAF
  - RAF Odiham = No. 233 Squadron RAF with the Dakota
  - Paris (No. 107 Wing RAF)
  - RAF Croydon (No. 110 Wing RAF) = No. 147 Squadron RAF with the Dakota & No. 1316 (Dutch) Flight RAF
  - RAF Blackbushe (No. 110 Wing RAF) = No. 167 Squadron RAF with the Warwick
  - Brussels (No. 111 Wing RAF)
  - Brussels/Evere = No. 575 Squadron RAF with the Dakota
  - Brussels/Melsbrook = No. 437 Squadron RCAF with the Dakota.
