= No. 1697 (Air Despatch Letter Service) Flight RAF =

Defunct flight of the Royal Air Force

No. 1697 (Air Despatch Letter Service) Flight
- Active: April 1944–March 1945
- Country: United Kingdom
- Branch: Royal Air Force
- Part of: No. 46 Group, Transport Command
- Aircraft operated: Hawker Hurricane; Avro Anson; Douglas Dakota
- Engagements: Operation Overlord

Commanders
- Notable commanders: James Storrar

Insignia
- Unit Identity Code: DR

No. 1697 (Air Despatch Letter Service) Flight was a unit of the Royal Air Force that was formed at Hendon in April 1944 for the purpose of providing secure communications between Supreme Headquarters Allied Expeditionary Force and unit commanders in the Normandy beachhead during the 1944 Allied invasion of France. Operating mainly Hawker Hurricanes, it continued to deliver mail and small packages close to the front line during the Allied advance into France and Belgium. It was disbanded in March 1945.

== Formation ==
For Operation Overlord, the Allied invasion of Normandy, it was expected that it may take some time for conventional forms of communication, such as radios and teleprinters, to be set up in the beachhead. As such an alternative method of securely communicating between the Supreme Headquarters Allied Expeditionary Force (SHAEF) and the landing units in Normandy would be required. Accordingly, the Royal Air Force (RAF) formed No. 1697 (Air Despatch Letter Service) Flight at Hendon on 22 April 1944 for this purpose.

Commanded by an experienced fighter pilot, Squadron Leader James Storrar, the flight was part of Transport Command's No. 46 Group. As the unit was potentially to operate close to the front-lines, an armed fighter was deemed necessary to equip the flight. Accordingly, the Hawker Hurricane fighter was selected. This was a monoplane aircraft that first entered service with the RAF in December 1937, but by 1944 was no longer suitable for front-line service in Europe. The flight used Hurricane Mk IICs, which had four cannons, and these were modified to take 31 cubic feet of mail and packages. It had a range of 350 miles, more than enough to fly to Normandy and back, and this could be extended with underwing drop tanks.

The flight's aircraft, which it began to receive on 29 April, carried the unit identity code DR and just prior to D-Day, was painted with black and white invasion stripes for recognition purposes.

== Operational history ==
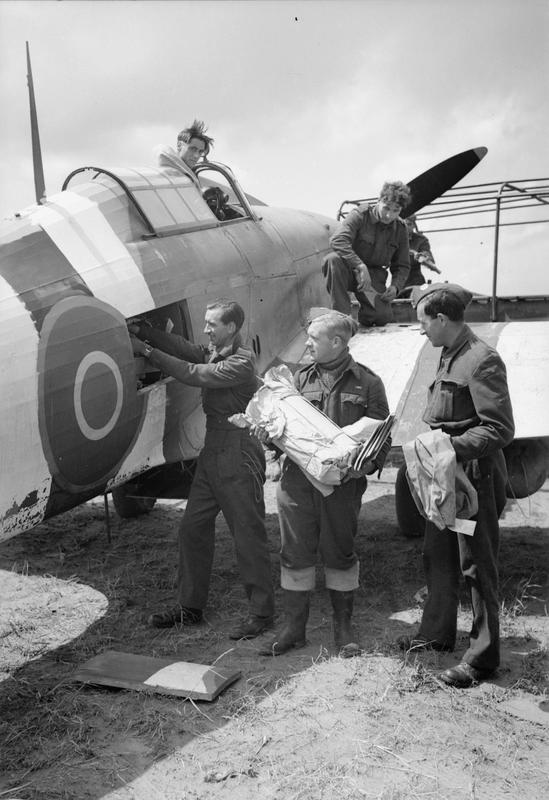
Mail being loaded into a Hawker Hurricane Mk IIC of No. 1697 (Air Despatch Letter Service) Flight at Bazenville, June 1944

No. 1697 Flight began operations in May, having shifted to Northolt since its formation. Its early sorties were to carry mail to and from Thorney Island and Harrowbeer, where units with significant roles in the invasion were based. Following the commencement of the invasion of Normandy on D-Day, 6 June, no sorties to Normandy could be made until a suitable airstrip had been prepared in the beachhead.

One such airstrip, designated 'B3', was constructed inland of Gold Beach at Sainte-Croix-sur-Mer. Two Hurricanes were placed on standby on 9 June, and later that day, they were instructed to prepare for a sortie to Normandy the following day. Storrar duly flew to B3 and landed there just after midday, 10 June, the first Allied aircraft to land in France since D-Day. He was followed by Wing Commander Beytagh in the second Hurricane. Once they had been relieved of their cargo, and taken on mail for SHAEF, they flew back to the United Kingdom, landing there at 1:40pm. Two more pilots transported additional despatches later the same day but became lost and set down on a partially completed landing strip in the American sector of the beachhead. They then took off for B3 and landed safely there.

The airstrip at B3 was deemed unsatisfactory so for the next round of sorties, carried out on 13 June, despatches were dropped in a container rather than having the Hurricanes land. A second airstrip, at Bazenville and designated 'B2', subsequently became operational and was used for a time. By the end of June, over 70 sorties had been made to Normandy by the unit.

From July, the flight began to receive alternative aircraft to supplement the Hurricanes; Avro Ansons and Douglas Dakotas. Its services were now focused on mail delivery to and from France, the internal flights to Thorney Island and Harrowbeer no longer required. As the Allied ground forces advanced deeper into France, the unit moved forward as well, flying from Northolt to new airstrips established further inland. A total of 220 sorties were made in July, and even more the following month.

A detachment of the flight was based in Paris once the city had been liberated. Storrar made the first landing for the unit at the newly liberated capital of Belgium, Brussels, on 8 September. The following month, he was succeeded by Squadron Leader R. Kitchen. During October, the flight's complement of Ansons was detached to form the basis of No. 1322 (Air Despatch Letter Service) Flight. By the end of the year, the flight was scheduled to move from Northolt to a new base in Belgium but this never eventuated. The flight was deemed to be no longer required and it was officially disbanded in March 1945. Some of its pilots and aircraft had earlier been transferred to the control of the Second Tactical Air Force.
