= James Storrar =

British flying ace of WWII

James Storrar DFC* AFC
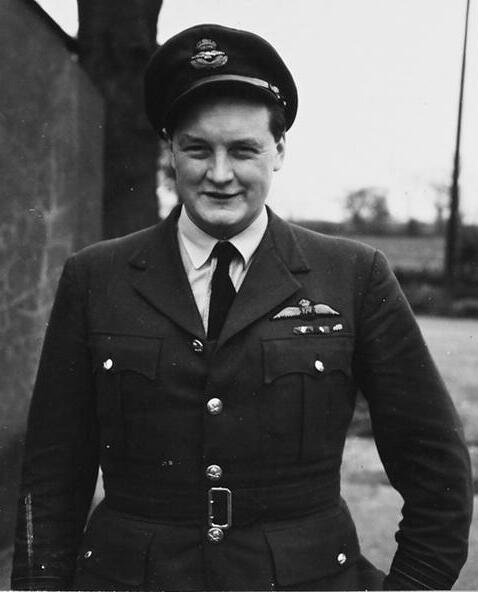
- Storrar in 1945
- Born: 24 July 1921; Ormskirk, Lancashire, England
- Died: 29 March 1995 (aged 73)
- Military career
- Allegiance: United Kingdom
- Branch: Royal Air Force; Royal Auxiliary Air Force
- Service years: 1938–1947 (RAF); 1949–1959 (RAuxAF)
- Rank: Wing Commander
- Nickname: 'Jas'
- Commands: No. 610 Squadron; No. 239 Wing; No. 234 Squadron; No. 165 Squadron; No. 64 Squadron; No. 1697 (Air Despatch Letter Service) Flight; No. 65 Squadron
- Conflicts: Second World War: Battle of France; Battle of Britain; Western Desert campaign; Operation Carthage; Liberation of the German-occupied Channel Islands
- Awards: Distinguished Flying Cross & Bar; Mention in Despatches; Air Force Cross
- Other work: veterinarian

James Eric Storrar, DFC & Bar, AFC (24 July 1921 – 29 March 1995) was a British flying ace who served with the Royal Air Force (RAF) during the Second World War. He was credited with having shot down at least fourteen aircraft.

Born in Ormskirk, Storrar joined the RAF when he was 17-years-old. Once he gained his wings, he was posted to No. 145 Squadron just after the commencement of the Second World War. He flew Hawker Hurricane fighters during the Battle of France, during which he claimed his first aerial victories. He achieved further success during the Battle of Britain. In late-1940, he was posted to No. 73 Squadron and went to the Middle East with this unit, flying in the Western Desert campaign. Storrar returned to the United Kingdom in mid-1941 to be treated for malaria and towards the end of the year returned to duty as an instructor.

From January to November 1943 Storrar commanded No. 65 Squadron, carrying out sorties to German-occupied France. This was followed by another period of instructing duties before he was appointed commander of No. 1697 (Air Despatch Letter Service) Flight in April 1944. Flying with this unit, he made the first landing by a British aircraft on the Normandy beachhead following the invasion of France of 6 June. From October 1944 to March 1945, he held a series of squadron commands, and led No. 234 Squadron during its involvement in Operation Carthage. He subsequently led a fighter wing during Liberation of the German-occupied Channel Islands in May 1945. In the immediate postwar period he commanded No. 239 Wing in Italy. He left the RAF in 1947 and studied veterinary science, during which he commenced a nearly ten-year period of service in the Royal Auxiliary Air Force, including a period as commander of No. 610 Squadron. He was a veterinary surgeon in Chester until shortly before his death in 1995, aged 73.

== Early life ==
James Eric Storrar was born at Ormskirk, in Lancashire, England, on 24 July 1921. Educated at Chester City and Country School, he falsified his age to join the Royal Air Force (RAF) in October 1938 on a short-service commission. His flight training commenced early the following year at No. 1 Elementary and Reserve Flying Training School at Hatfield. In April, having been commissioned as an acting pilot officer, he then proceeded to No. 11 Flying Training School at Shawbury. In August, prior to completion of his six-month training course, he was transferred to the Blenheim Conversion Flight.

== Second World War ==
Storrar, who was nicknamed 'Jas', was posted to the newly formed No. 145 Squadron in October 1939. This was based at Croydon and operated the Bristol Blenheim aircraft in a day/night fighter role but in March 1940, the squadron converted to the Hawker Hurricane fighter. By this time Storrar had been confirmed in his pilot officer rank. Following the commencement of the Battle of France in May, the squadron began carrying out sorties to France, supporting the fighter squadrons there in helping to cover the retreat of the British Expeditionary Force (BEF). Storrar claimed his first aerial victory on 23 May, destroying a Messerschmitt Bf 110 heavy fighter near Saint-Omer. The following day he shot down a Dornier Do 17 medium bomber in the vicinity of Gravelines. On 27 May, he destroyed a pair of Bf 110s, both near Dunkirk.

=== Battle of Britain ===
Following the evacuation of the BEF from Dunkirk, No. 145 Squadron relocated to Tangmere and began to be involved in the aerial fighting over the English Channel during the early phase of the Battle of Britain. Storrar shot down a Heinkel He 111 medium bomber to the south of St Catherine's Point on 11 July. In an engagement to the south east of Selsey Bill on 15 July, he claimed a Do 17 as destroyed but this was unconfirmed. He shared in the destruction of a He 111 south of Bognor three days later. Flying to the south of the Isle of Wight on 27 July, he shot down a Messerschmitt Bf 109 fighter. Two days later, he combined with two other pilots to shoot down a Junkers Ju 88 medium bomber. On 8 August, again flying to the south of Isle of Wight, he shot down two Junkers Ju 87 dive bombers, and damaged a third. Four days later he claimed a Bf 110 as probably destroyed on 12 August to the west of Selsey Bill. His successes saw him awarded the Distinguished Flying Cross (DFC) on 30 August. The citation, published in The London Gazette, read:

This officer took part in the intensive fighting over Dunkirk last May, and has since been engaged in numerous successful actions. His squadron was responsible for the destruction of twenty-one enemy aircraft in one day; he personally destroyed two of these. Pilot Officer Storrar has displayed an unfailing desire to engage the enemy at all times and has shot down eight enemy aircraft.

— London Gazette, No. 34935, 30 August 1940

No. 145 Squadron was withdrawn to Drem in Scotland for a period of rest and recuperation under less strenuous conditions. Storrar's last aerial victory of the Battle of Britain was on 8 September, when he shared in shooting down a Do 17 near Montrose. This claim was deemed as a probable. Towards the end of the month, he was posted to No. 73 Squadron. Another Hurricane-equipped squadron, this was stationed at Castle Camps and operating in a night-fighter role. In October he was briefly seconded to No. 421 Flight at Gravesend, but only made one sortie with this unit before returning to No. 73 Squadron. He was promoted to flying officer later in the month.

=== Middle East ===
No. 73 Squadron relocated to the Middle East in November 1940, initially stationed at Heliopolis along with No. 274 Squadron for training. It became operational at Sidi Haneish Airfield on 1 January 1941. Storrar claimed his first aerial victory in the Western Desert campaign on 6 January, shooting down a Fiat CR.42 fighter to the west of Tobruk. He destroyed a Caproni Ca.309 reconnaissance aircraft on the ground at Apollonia Airfield on 1 February and then a few days later, while attacking Benina Airfield, shared in the destruction of eight aircraft on the ground. He damaged a Bf 110 over Benghazi on 19 February. By March the squadron was operating in defence of Tobruk, carrying out patrolling duties. Storrar destroyed a Ju 87 to the south east of Derna on 8 April but was subsequently shot down himself by a Bf 110. He walked for 32 miles to reach the Allied lines. His service with the squadron ended when he was rested later in April.

Storrar was assigned to aircraft ferrying duties, based at Takoradi. On one transport flight to Freetown, carried out on 21 June, he was flying in formation with other pilots when weather conditions forced them to make a landing in the jungle in Liberia. Unable to take off again, they had to walk for over two days to reach a rubber plantation that was 56 kilometres (35 mi) from Monrovia. During his time at Takoradi, he was occasionally called upon to attempt interceptions of Vichy French aircraft from French West Africa. Coming down with malaria, he was medically repatriated to the United Kingdom in July.

=== Later war service ===
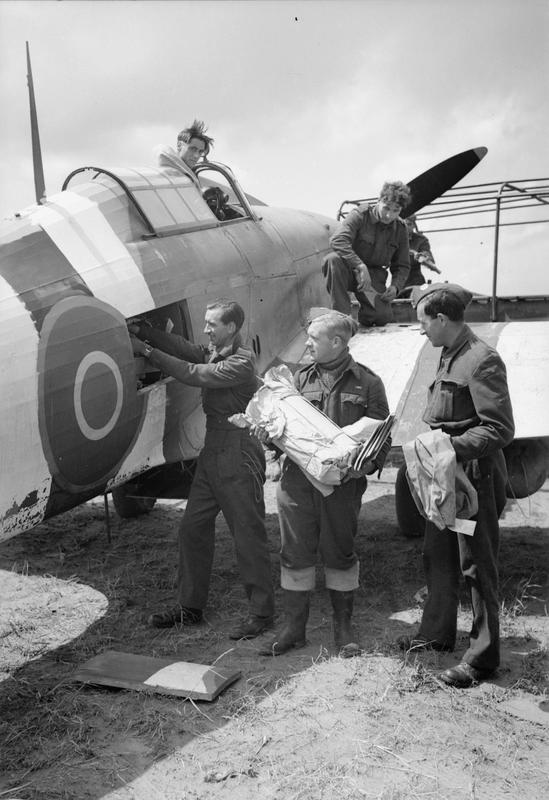
Mail being loaded into a Hawker Hurricane Mk IIC of No. 1697 (Air Despatch Letter Service) Flight at Bazenville, June 1944

Promoted to flight lieutenant on 23 October 1941, Storrar returned to duty the following month as an instructor at No. 55 Operational Training Unit (OTU) at Annan, where he was in charged of the gunnery squadron. In January 1943 he returned to operations with a promotion to acting squadron leader and a posting as commander of No. 65 Squadron. This was based at Drem and equipped with the Supermarine Spitfire Mk Vb fighter. For several weeks it was engaged in training for aircraft carrier operations, but moved to Perranporth in Cornwall in March, and then Selsey a few months later, performing bomber escort duties. Storrar was mentioned in dispatches in June. Later that month he claimed a Focke-Wulf Fw 190 fighter as probably destroyed near Le Havre. In August, the squadron began to receive upgraded Spitfire Mk. IXs, and in one of these he shot down a Bf 109 on 18 August over Cassel. He damaged a Fw 190 to the south of Dunkirk on 31 August. His last aerial victory was on 18 September, when he destroyed a Fw 190 north of Rouen. Awarded a Bar to his DFC on 29 October, his tenure as commander of No. 65 Squadron ended the following month.

Returning to instructing duties on 15 November, this time with No. 53 OTU, Storrar was initially a gunnery trainer but soon became the chief flying instructor. In late April 1944 he was posted to No. 1697 (Air Despatch Letter Service) Flight, based at Hendon. This Hurricane-equipped unit was created in anticipation of Operation Overlord, the invasion of Normandy, for the purpose of delivering secret mail from Britain to the beachhead until communication links had been established. Storrar was the commander of the unit and on 10 June, he piloted the first British aircraft to land in France since the commencement of the invasion. By the end of June, over 70 sorties to the beachhead had been made by No. 1697 Flight. Storrar later made at least one sortie to Paris for the purpose of delivering messages to the French Resistance, even before the advancing Allied forces secured the city.

From October 1944 to March 1945, Storrar held a series of squadron commands; firstly at No. 64 Squadron, then No. 165 Squadron and lastly No. 234 Squadron, overseeing the latter's conversion to the North American P-51 Mustang fighter. He led the squadron during Operation Carthage, the RAF's attack of 21 March 1945 on the Gestapo headquarters in Copenhagen, providing cover for the attacking light bombers. He was appointed acting wing commander at Hunsdon in late March and led the station's fighter wing during Operation Nestegg, the Allied reoccupation of the island of Jersey on 9 May. He later commanded fighter wings at Digby and then Molesworth. During this time his rank as squadron leader was made substantive.

When the war ended in August, Storrar was serving as a staff officer at the headquarters of No. 12 Group. He was credited with having shot down fourteen aircraft, two of which being shared with other pilots. He is also credited with one unconfirmed aerial victory, two probably destroyed with a third shared, and three damaged. He is also responsible with destroying one aircraft on the ground, and with eight others shared.

== Later life ==
Storrar remained in the RAF until April 1947, with most of his postwar service spent as commander of No. 239 Wing in Italy. Returning to civilian life, Storrar trained in veterinary science at Edinburgh University. In mid-1949, he joined the Royal Auxiliary Air Force (RAuxAF), serving with No. 603 Squadron for nearly three years. In 1954 he was appointed commander of the RAuxAF's No. 610 Squadron until it was disbanded in March 1957. During his time as leader of the squadron, the then Squadron Leader Storrar was awarded the Air Force Cross (AFC) in the 1955 New Year Honours. He relinquished his commission on 25 June 1959, thereby ending his military service.

Following completion of his university studies, Storrar joined his family's veterinary practice in Chester, which had been operating for over 150 years. A Member of the Royal College of Veterinary Surgeons, he practiced until at least 1994. He died the following year, on 29 March.
