= Jiyanklis Air Base =

Jiyanklis Air Base
- Arabic: قاعدة جيانكليس الجوية
- Kafr El Dawwar, Beheira Governorate in Egypt

Site information
- Type: Air Base
- Owner: Ministry of Defense (Egypt)
- Operator: Egyptian Air Force

Location
- Shown within Egypt
- Coordinates: 30°49′18″N 030°11′35″E

Airfield information
- Elevation: 10 metres (33 ft) AMSL
Runways
Direction	Length and surface
11/29	2,885 metres (9,465 ft) Asphalt
12/30	2,890 metres (9,482 ft) Asphalt

Jiyanklis Air Base is a Air base of the Egyptian Air Force located south of Kafr El Dawwar, Beheira Governorate, Egypt.

The base is home to 75, 77 and 79 Squadrons, all flying General Dynamics F-16C/D-40 Fighting Falcon as part of 272 Tactical Fighter Wing of 139 Air Division.

History

As RAF Gianaclis the base was home to the following Royal Air Force squadrons:

- No. 38 Squadron RAF
- No. 39 Squadron RAF
- No. 47 Squadron RAF
- No. 148 Squadron RAF
- No. 221 Squadron RAF
- No. 252 Squadron RAF
- No. 255 Squadron RAF
- No. 272 Squadron RAF
- No. 459 Squadron RAAF
- No. 512 Squadron RAF
