= Sainte-Croix-sur-Mer Airfield =

Sainte-Croix-sur-Mer Airfield Advanced Landing Ground B-3
- Sainte-Croix-sur-Mer Airfield (France)

Site information
- Type: Military Airfield
- Controlled by: Royal Air Force

Location
- Coordinates: 49°19′08″N 000°31′06″W

Site history
- In use: June–September 1944
- Battles/wars: Western Front (World War II)

Sainte-Croix-sur-Mer Airfield is a former World War II airfield, located 1 km northwest of Sainte-Croix-sur-Mer in the Normandy region, France. The airfield was located only 3.5 kilometers from the Normandy Gold landing beach, and when it opened the frontline was not much further away. Over the first month of its existence the frontline only moved to 19 kilometers (11 miles) away.

== History ==
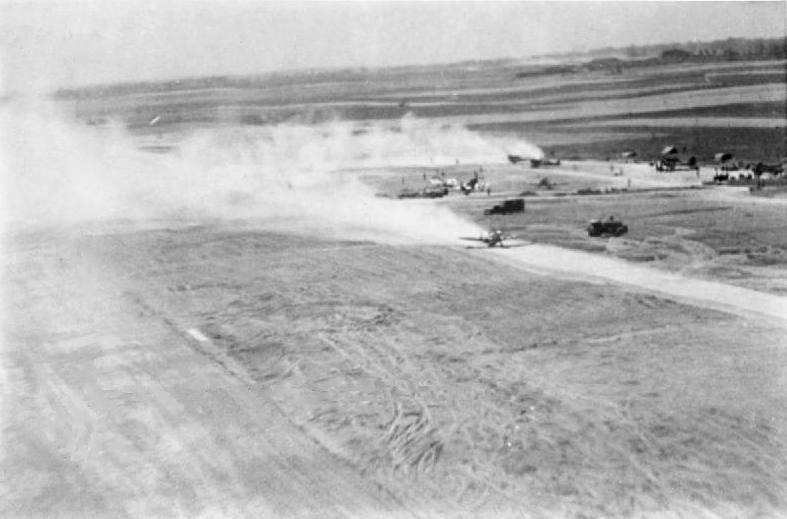
A Second Tactical Air Force Spitfire Mark IX landing at B3/Ste Croix-sur-Mer.

Sainte-Croix-sur-Mer Airfield was constructed by a Royal Engineers Airfield Construction Group just after D-Day. The group built a 3,600 foot runway and dispersal areas using SMT, while communications facilities were provided by equipment installed in vehicles. Being a temporary airfield, its facilities were basic, but adequate. A fuel and ammunition dump was located near the airfield.

It was used by RAF 144 and 146 Wing and was also used to evacuate injured soldiers, sailors and airmen to England. In addition a constant stream of other Allied squadrons used the airfield for fuel, ammunition or repair. On 23 July 1944 Prime Minister Winston Churchill paid a morale boosting visit to B.3 St. Croix-sur-Mer, flown by Air Vice Marshal Harry Broadhurst in his captured Fieseler Storch. He did a speech at the airfield, and then visited troops in the area by jeep.

The airfield was used until 4 September 1944. Afterwards the engineers moved in and dismantled all recoverable equipment along with the SMT. The land was then returned to the French farmers, and over the decades, the land has been used as agricultural fields. Today, nothing remains of the former airfield.
