= Apollonia Airfield =

Airfield near Apollonia, Libya, 1941–1943

Apollonia Airfield
- Apollonia in Libya

Site information
- Type: Military airfield
- Operator: Luftwaffe; Regia Aeronautica; Royal Air Force
- Condition: Abandoned

Location
- Shown within Libya
- Coordinates: 32°53′48″N 21°57′46″E

Site history
- In use: 1941 - 1943
- Battles/wars: North African Campaign

Apollonia Airfield, also known as Susah Airfield or Mersa Susa Airfield, was a World War II airfield located south of Apollonia in Libya. It was established in 1941 for use by the Luftwaffe, however it was later captured by Allied forces. Afterwards, it was used by the Royal Air Force in 1943.

== History ==
During 1941, Apollonia Airfield was staffed by personnel of Regia Aeronautica, and saw infrequent passes by Italian and German aircraft. Apollonia Airfield operated a grass covered gravel soil landing ground measuring 825 meters wide and 550 meters long, which was undulated and sloped eastward. The landing ground was maintained by rolling and clearing, and was marked with landing markers. Facilities included messes, 3 barracks, a single medium 2,000 m^{2} metal double hangar, and 2 small underground fuel tanks with a capacity of 7 m^{3}. There were several separate workshops located on the northwest corner, storage facilities adjacent to the east side of the hangar, dispersal facilities for up to 30 aircraft, and 3 servicing hardstands on the northern boundary.

On 1 February 1941, the airfield was strafed by 6 RAF Hurricanes, claiming that 3 Caproni Ca.309 Ghiblis and 1 Caproni Ca.310 light bomber was destroyed, while Italian records claim only 2 Ca.310s were damaged. On 4 February 1941, during Operation Compass, British forward units entered Cirene, which isolated Apollonia Airfield. On 22 October 1941, while facing fire from shore batteries, a British submarine bombarded Apollonia Airfield, hitting hangars and other buildings multiple times.

== Units ==
The following lists the units that were based at Apollonia Airfield:

Luftwaffe

Motorised Luftwaffe medical detachment, 4th unit / Medical Abteilung VII (Tropical), June 1942

Royal Air Force

- No. 94 Squadron RAF detachment, 1 April 1943 - 1 May 1943, equipped with Spitfire VC
- No. 94 Squadron RAF, 25 May 1943 - 19 June 1943, equipped with Spitfire VC
- No. 2914 Squadron RAF Regiment
- No. 2923 Squadron RAF Regiment
- No. 2926 Squadron RAF Regiment
- No. 2927 Squadron RAF Regiment
- No. 1 (ME) Rest Centre, March 1943
- No. 886 Air Ministry Experimental Station, February 1943

== Accidents & incidents ==
- On 22 December 1941, a RAF Short S.25 Sunderland registered as T9071 en route from Birżebbuġa to Abu Qir was shot down by a German fighter. It crashed off the Libyan coast near Apollonia, and all 12 crew members were rescued. Some sustained injuries, and one succumbed to their injuries a day later.
