= RAF Broadwell =

Former Royal Air Force station

RAF Broadwell
- Broadwell, Oxfordshire in England

Site information
- Owner: Air Ministry
- Operator: Royal Air Force
- Controlled by: RAF Transport Command

Location
- Shown within Oxfordshire
- Coordinates: 51°45′25″N 1°38′22″W

Site history
- Built: 1943
- In use: 1943–1947
- Battles/wars: Second World War

Airfield information
Runways
Direction	Length and surface
00/00	Concrete
00/00	Concrete
00/00	Concrete

Royal Air Force Broadwell or more simply RAF Broadwell is a former Royal Air Force station located 2 miles north of Broadwell and 3 miles southeast of Burford, Oxfordshire, and within 2 miles of RAF Brize Norton.

It opened on 15 November 1943, operating under RAF Transport Command, and closed on 31 March 1947. It had three concrete runways in a triangular configuration.

== History ==
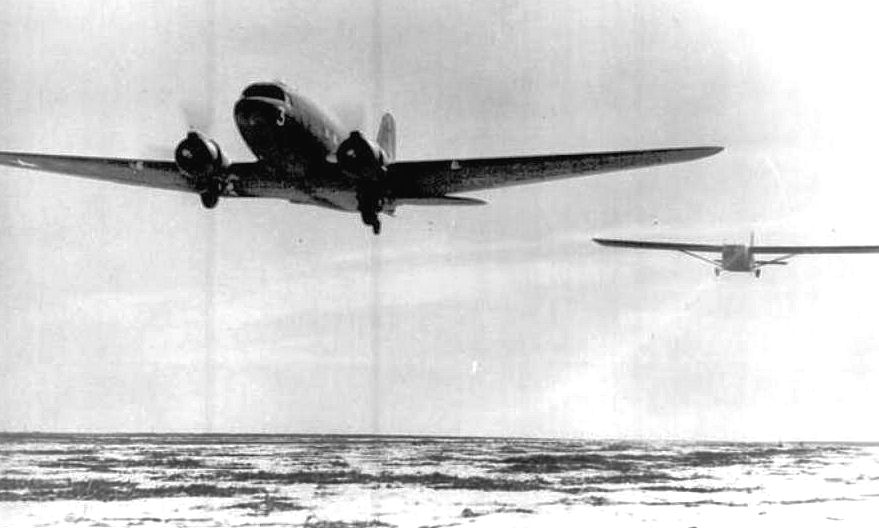
C-47 Dakota and CG-4 Glider

Summary and chronology of RAF Broadwell (PDF, 16 pages)

No. 512 Squadron and No. 575 Squadron were based here, flying the Douglas Dakota.

In February 1944, No. 512 Squadron was transferred to No. 46 Group at RAF Broadwell. It was a tactical Dakota squadron and started training glider towing and parachute dropping. Its first operation in the new role was a leaflet drop on 17 April 1944 over France; this was followed by intensive flying in and out of France.

Broadwell took part in the D-Day assaults alongside nearby RAF Down Ampney and RAF Blakehill Farm. On the eve of D-Day, No. 575 Squadron dropped 5 Para into the invasion drop zone. On D-day itself, 512 Squadron can claim that they were the first planes over Normandy, as 3 Dakotas piloted by Fl Lt Hyde, W.O. James Proctor and a C Flight Flying Officer dropped a specialist team at 00.02 on 6 June to try and disrupt the Merville Gun Battery before the main assault. Later on 6 June, it towed 21 Horsa gliders into France. In the next few weeks it started a casualty evacuation service from France back to England.

In September 1944, it was involved in operations at Arnhem including dropping parachutists as part of Operation Market Garden, where the squadron suffered severe casualties.

The airfield continued to be a terminus for long-range transport operations to Europe, the Middle East and India.

The following units were here at some point:

- No. 6 (RCAF) Casualty Air Evacuation Unit
- No. 10 Squadron RAF
- No. 21 Heavy Glider Conversion Unit RAF
- No. 76 Squadron RAF
- No. 77 Squadron RAF
- No. 91 (Forward) Staging Post
- No. 92 (Forward) Staging Post
- No. 94 (Forward) Staging Post
- No. 104 Terminal Staging Post
- No. 105 (Major) Staging Post
- No. 126 Staging Post
- No. 271 Squadron RAF
- No. 512 Squadron RAF
- No. 575 Squadron RAF
- No. 2792 Squadron RAF Regiment
- No. 2807 Squadron RAF Regiment

== Current use ==
The site has returned to farmland and has a large solar farm covering the western side of the airfield. The southern part of the runway remains discernable and a bridleway passes along part of it. f
