= No. 575 Squadron RAF =

Defunct flying squadron of the Royal Air Force

- Active: 1 February 1944 – 15 August 1946
- Country: United Kingdom
- Branch: Royal Air Force
- Type: Inactive
- Role: Transport
- Part of: No. 46 Group, RAF Transport Command
- Motto(s): The air is our path

Insignia
- Squadron Badge heraldry: A hand couped at the wrist, supporting a terrestrial globe
- Squadron Codes: I9 (Feb 1944 – Aug 1946)

No. 575 Squadron RAF was a transport squadron of the Royal Air Force during the Second World War.

== History ==
The squadron was formed at RAF Hendon on 1 February 1944 from elements of 512 Squadron. Just two weeks later it moved to RAF Broadwell to work-up as a tactical transport squadron with the Douglas Dakota, the military transport version of the Douglas DC-3 airliner. The squadron's first operations were leaflet raids on France, on the eve of D-Day it dropped the 5th Para brigade into the invasion drop zone (Operation Tonga). On 6 June it towed 21 gliders into France. In the next few weeks it started a casualty evacuation service from France back to England. In September 1944 it was heavily involved in operations at Arnhem, suffering casualties.

After the end of the war the squadron began flying to and from India from RAF Melbourne in Yorkshire and later from RAF Blakehill Farm. In January 1946 it moved to RAF Bari in Italy to operate an air service between Italy, Austria, Romania, Greece and Bulgaria. It was eventually disbanded at RAF Kabrit, Egypt on 15 August 1946.

== Aircraft operated ==
Aircraft operated by no. 575 Squadron RAF, data from
From	To	Aircraft	Version
February 1944	August 1946	Douglas Dakota	Mk.III
June 1944	May 1945	Avro Anson	Mk.I
March 1945	August 1946	Douglas Dakota	Mk.IV

== Squadron bases ==
Bases and airfields used by no. 575 Squadron RAF, data from
From	To	Base	Remark
1 February 1944	14 February 1944	RAF Hendon, Middlesex	
14 February 1944	5 August 1945	RAF Broadwell, Oxfordshire	Dets. at B.56/Evere and B.70/Deurne, Belgium
5 August 1945	16 November 1945	RAF Melbourne, Yorkshire	
16 November 1945	11 January 1946	RAF Blakehill Farm, Wiltshire	
11 January 1946	26 July 1946	RAF Bari, Italy	
26 July 1946	15 August 1946	RAF Kabrit, Egypt	

== Commanding officers ==
Officers commanding no. 575 Squadron RAF, data from
From	To	Name
February 1944	December 1944	W/Cdr. T.A. Jefferson, AFC
December 1944	July 1945	W/Cdr. E.C. Deanesly, DFC
July 1945	August 1946	W/Cdr. B.L. Duigan, DSO, DFC

== See also ==
- List of Royal Air Force aircraft squadrons
