= RAF Blakehill Farm =

Former RAF airfield in Wiltshire, England

RAF Blakehill Farm
- Cricklade, Wiltshire in England
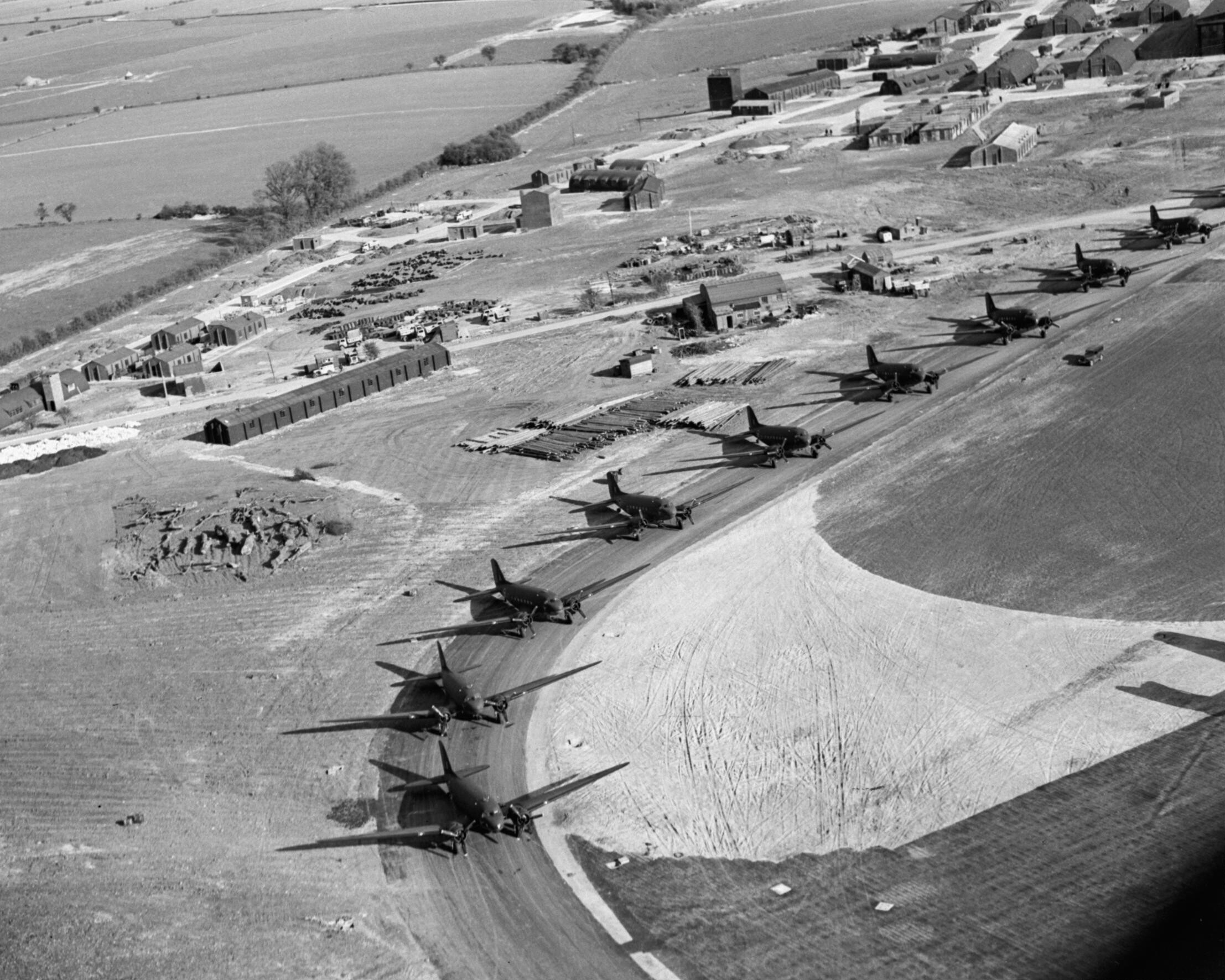
- Dakotas of No. 233 Squadron RAF lined up on the perimeter track at RAF Blakehill Farm, for an exercise with the 6th Airborne Division, 20 April 1944

Site information
- Owner: Air Ministry
- Operator: Royal Air Force
- Controlled by: RAF Transport Command

Location
- Shown within Wiltshire
- Coordinates: 51°37′20″N 1°53′20″W

Site history
- Built: 1943
- In use: 1944–1952
- Battles/wars: Second World War

Airfield information
Runways
Direction	Length and surface
00/00	Concrete
00/00	Concrete
00/00	Concrete

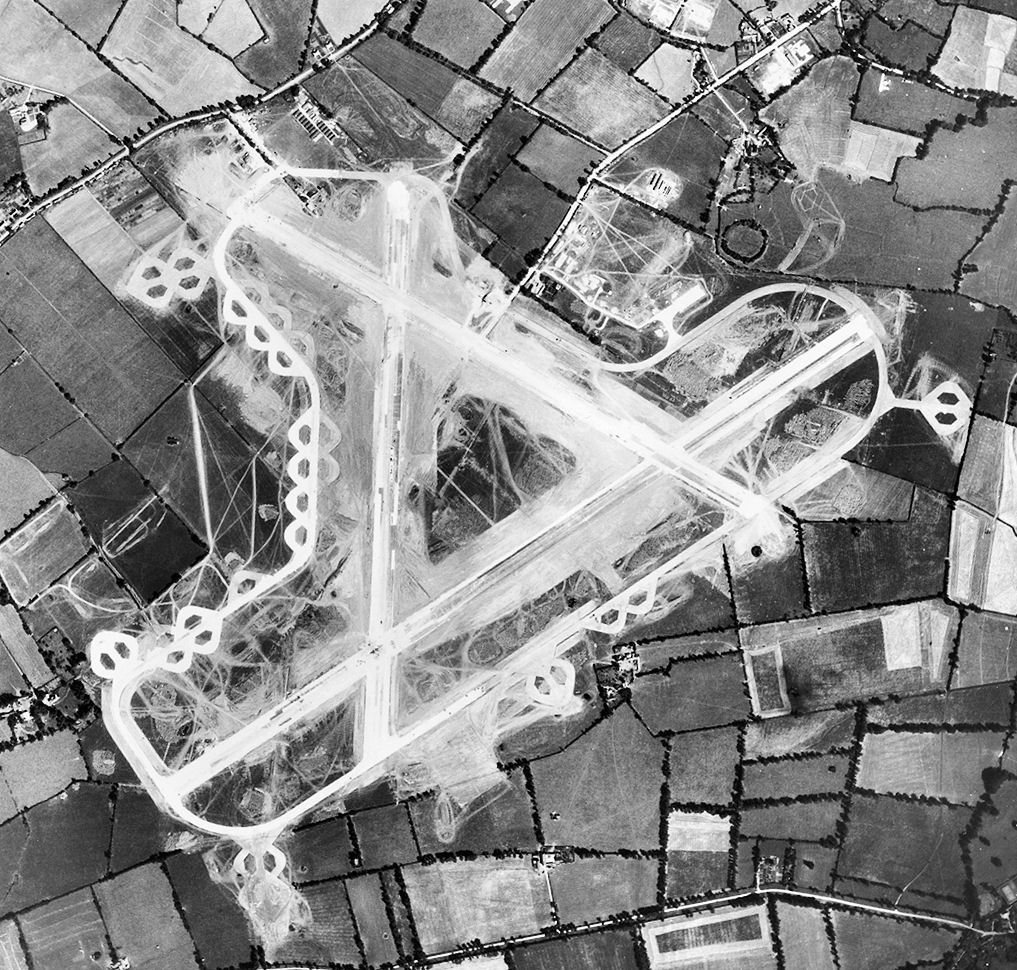
Aerial photograph of RAF Blakehill Farm, 17 July 1943. The technical and barrack sites are to the right (east) of the airfield.

Royal Air Force Blakehill Farm or more simply RAF Blakehill Farm is a former Royal Air Force station southwest of Cricklade in Wiltshire, England, operational between 1944 and 1952.

== History ==
The station was originally allocated to the United States Army Air Forces Ninth Air Force but not used. It opened in 1944 and was home for transport aircraft of No. 46 Group RAF Transport Command. In 1948 the airfield was a satellite of RAF South Cerney, and was used by training aircraft until the airfield closed in 1952 and was returned to agricultural use. The site is now a Wiltshire Wildlife Trust nature reserve.

== Units and aircraft ==
Unit	From	To	Aircraft	Variant	Notes
No. 233 Squadron RAF	5 March 1944	8 June 1945	Douglas Dakota		
No. 271 Squadron RAF	26 February 1944	10 August 1945	Douglas Dakota; Harrow		Detachment from RAF Down Ampney
No. 437 Squadron RCAF	1 September 1944	7 May 1945	Douglas Dakota		Formed here
No. 575 Squadron RAF	24 November 1945	31 January 1946	Douglas Dakota		
No. 22 Heavy Glider Conversion Unit RAF	1945	1945	Waco Hadrian	I	
No. 2 Flying Training School RAF					
No. 109 (Transport) OTU RAF					
No. 1528 (Radio Aids Training) Flight RAF					Became No. 1555 (Radio Aids Training) Flight RAF
No. 1555 (Radio Aids Training) Flight RAF					

The following units were also here at some point:

- No. 18 Terminal Staging Post
- No. 19 Terminal Staging Post
- No. 92 (Forward) Staging Post
- No. 93 (Forward) Staging Post
- No. 123 (Major) Staging Post
- No. 2748 Squadron RAF Regiment
- No. 2835 Squadron RAF Regiment

== Post-war intelligence role ==
In 1967, GCHQ set up an "experimental radio station", a secret research facility, on the site. The site was still active in some capacity until the mid-1990s, and traces of the former communications mast bases can still be seen on aerial photographs. The most remarkable object of the facility was a 240-foot (73 m) tall wooden lattice tower, which was one of the tallest objects in the United Kingdom built of wood. It is possible that this tower was a relic of the wartime Chain Home network, although its lattice pattern is of another type. The tower was demolished on 26 January 2000.

== See also ==
- List of former Royal Air Force stations
