= No. 233 Squadron RAF =

Former flying squadron of the Royal Air Force

- Active: 31 August 1918 – 15 May 1919; 18 May 1937 – 15 December 1945; 1952–1957 1 September 1960 – 31 January 1964
- Country: United Kingdom
- Branch: Royal Air Force
- Role: Reconnaissance, Transport
- Mottos: Fortis et fidelis "Strong and faithful".

Insignia
- Squadron badge heraldry: In front of a trident and sword in saltire, a star of eight points.
- Squadron codes: EY (Apr 1939 – Sep 1939); ZS (Sep 1939 – Jul 1942); 5T (Mar 1944 – Dec 1948)

No. 233 Squadron RAF was a Royal Air Force squadron that operated from 1918–1919, 1937–1945, 1952–1957 and 1960–1964. The squadron was formed from several Royal Naval Air Service (RNAS) flights and took part in the tail end of the First World War before being disbanded. The squadron was reformed with the advent of World War II. At first No. 233 Squadron flew general reconnaissance patrols before being tasked with transportation duties just prior to D-Day. Shortly after the Second World War the squadron was again disbanded, to be reformed once more in 1960. No. 233 Squadron was finally disbanded in 1964.

== History ==
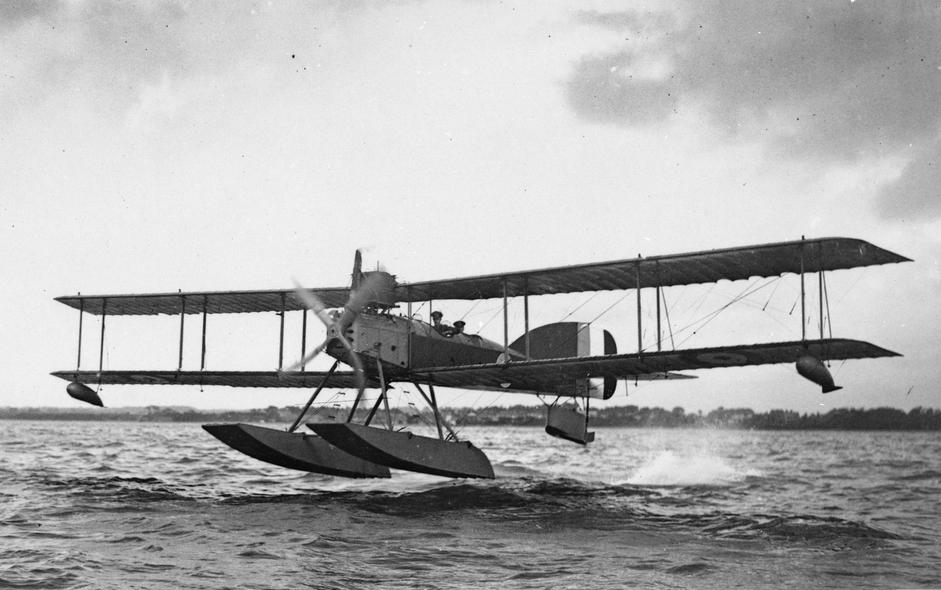
Short Type 184 seaplane. This type of aircraft was used by the squadron from August 1918 – May 1919.

=== First World War ===
The squadron was established at Dover on 31 August 1918, using flights from former RNAS stations at Dover and Walmer that had been absorbed by the RAF on 1 April 1918. Flights Nos. 407 and 491 flew anti-submarine patrols over the Strait of Dover, and No. 471 Flight at Walmer flew Sopwith Camels and was used to engage enemy fighters based in Belgium. In January 1919 Flight 491 was relocated to RAF Walmer flying DH9s and in early spring 233 Squadron was relocated to Walmer. No. 233 Squadron was disbanded on 15 May 1919.

=== Inter-war years ===
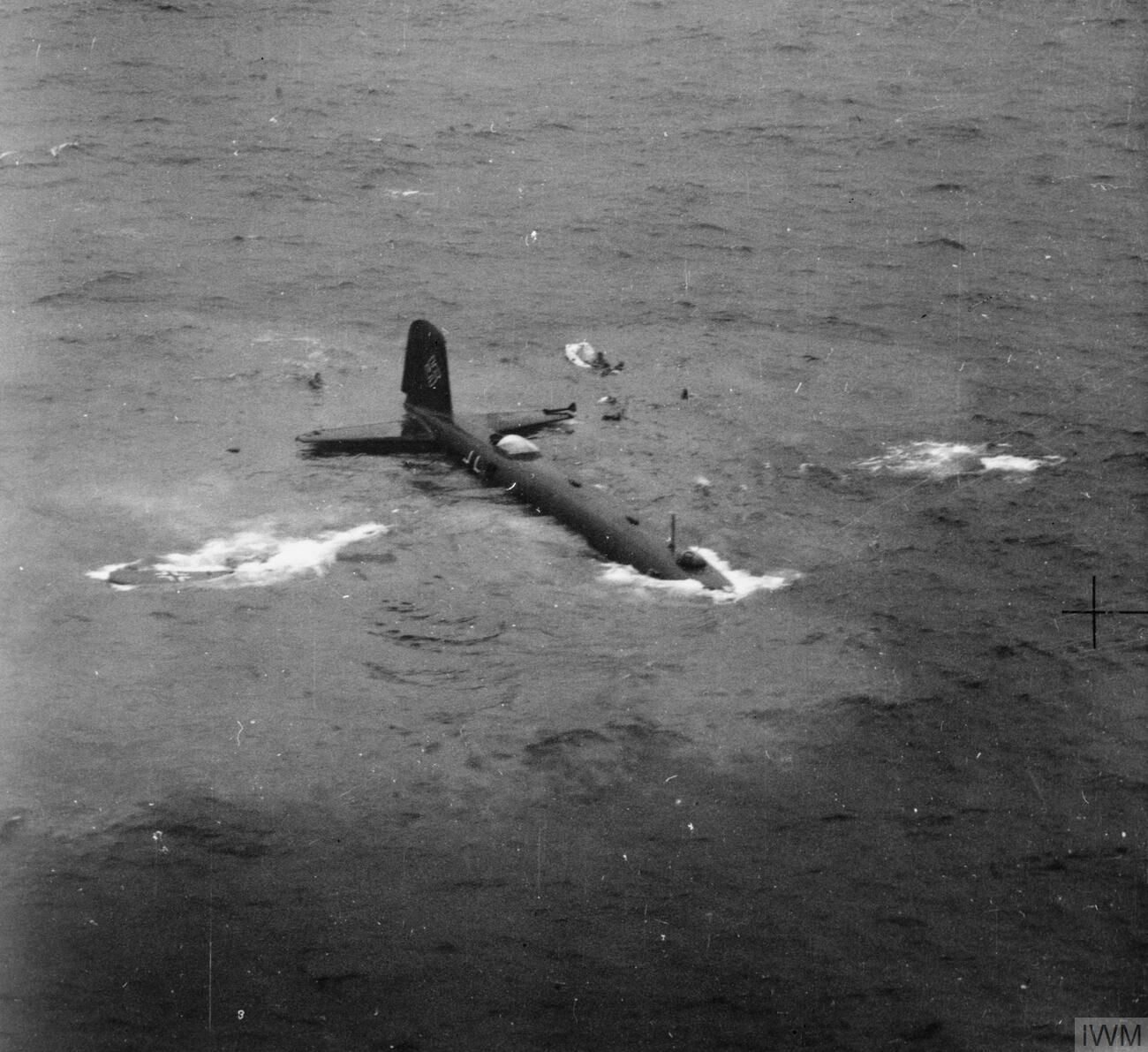
Fw-200 Condor sinking in the Atlantic Ocean, west of Ireland, after being shot down by a Lockheed Hudson of No. 233 Squadron RAF on 23 July 1941.

No. 233 Squadron was reformed on 18 May 1937 at RAF Tangmere as part of Coastal Command. It first used Avro Ansons for general reconnaissance until August 1938 when it was moved to Scotland and began converting to Lockheed Hudsons. Patrols were at first carried out by both Ansons and Hudsons, until the last flight by Ansons on 10 October 1939. By the end of October a flight of Bristol Blenheims had been added to the squadron, undertaking patrols until January 1940.

=== Second World War ===
Throughout 1940 No. 233 was one of five RAF squadrons equipped with Hudsons: Nos. 224, 233 and 269 operated over the North Sea along the Norwegian and Danish coasts, and Nos. 206 and 220 operated from the Netherlands to Denmark. When Denmark and Norway were invaded by Germany in April, Nos. 220, 224 and 233 Squadron flew attacks upon shipping and land targets, such as airfields, virtually every day. In August several detachments from Hudson squadrons began operating out of RAF Aldergrove in Northern Ireland. On 25 October 1940 three Hudsons from No. 233 engaged U-46, off the coast of Norway, seriously damaging the U-boat and forcing it to return to port. By December, No. 233 Squadron had completed its move to Aldergrove.

In May 1941 a Hudson from the squadron engaged and shot down a Heinkel He 111 bomber. Later in June the squadron damaged two U-boats, and on 23 July an aircraft from No. 233 Squadron shot down a Focke-Wulf Fw 200 Condor long-range reconnaissance bomber which was attacking a British convoy. No. 233 Squadron was moved to RAF St Eval in Cornwall in August 1941 in order to fly patrols over the Bay of Biscay. Within the first few weeks of operations out of St Eval, the squadron damaged an enemy ship and attacked four U-boats, suffering the loss of a Hudson.

==== Operations out of Gibraltar ====
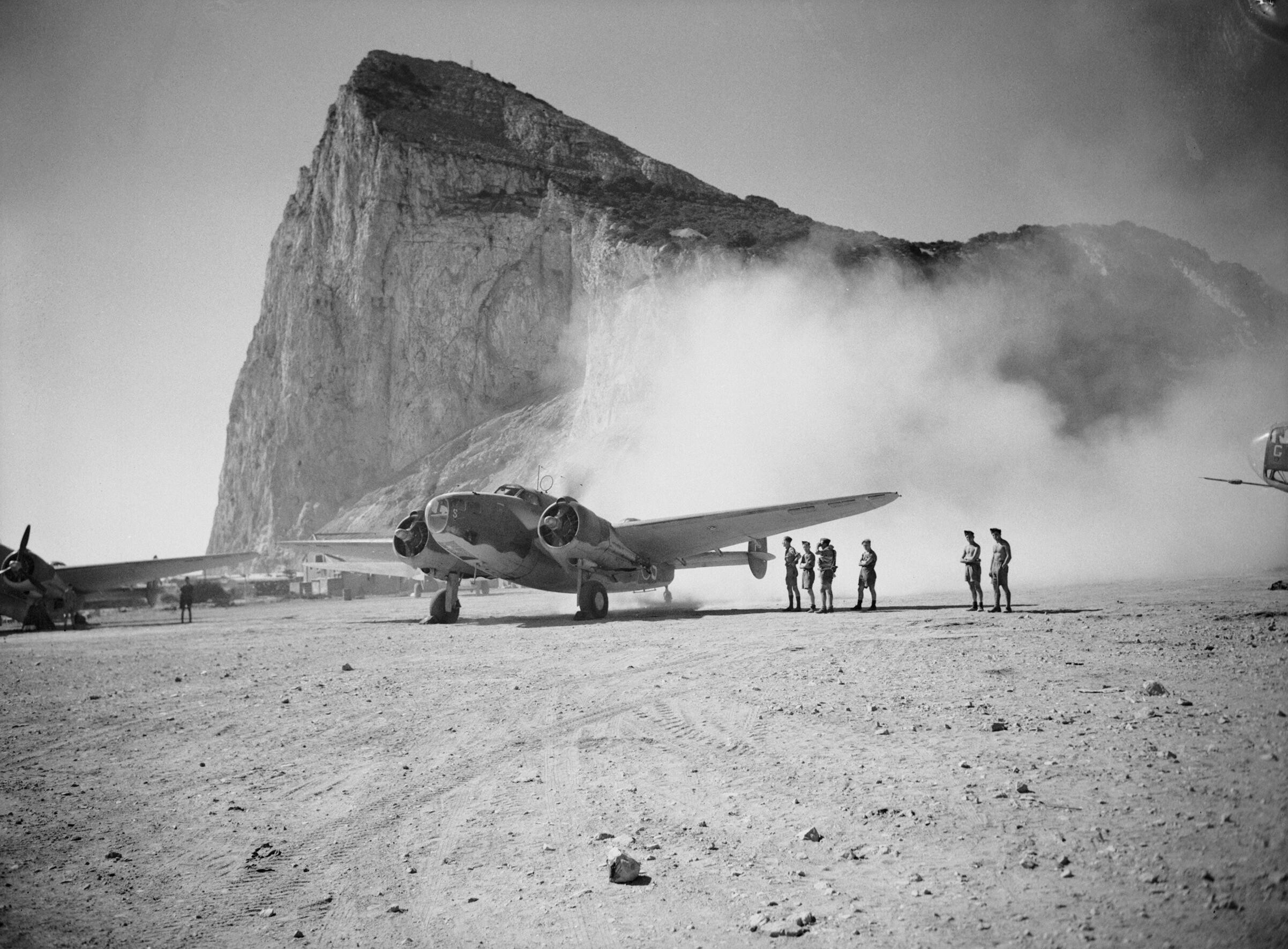
Lockheed Hudson of No. 233 Squadron RAF preparing for take-off in August 1942, with the Rock of Gibraltar in the background.

A detachment from No. 233 Squadron was sent to Gibraltar in December 1941, and gradually the rest of the unit followed (though another detachment was left at RAF Thorney Island). It was not until July 1942 that the squadron fully assembled in Gibraltar, where it remained until February 1944.

No. 233 was one of three Hudson squadrons in Gibraltar newly arrived from the UK.; it immediately took up anti-submarine operations. The squadron gained its first U-boat kill on 1 May 1942, when P/O Camacho attacked U-573, but did not seem to inflict any damage on the submarine. Later the same day, the U-boat was spotted by another Hudson, and an attack forced it to submerge, but it immediately re-surfaced and signalled its surrender. The U-boat sank later from damage that had been received in the first attack. No. 233 Squadron took part in Operation Torch, providing cover, before the Allied landings in French North Africa.

By 1943 there were four Hudson squadrons flying out of Gibraltar and Algeria: Nos. 48, 233, 500 and 608. In the early part of the year No. 233 was used in anti-submarine duties though as 1943 wore on the pace of operations began to slacken, and the units were mainly involved in escorting convoys, either by day or night, and large part of their duties were meteorological flights.

In March the squadron engaged no less than six enemy U-boats. On 28 March 1943 a Hudson from No. 48 Squadron engaged and damaged U-77 before radioing for assistance. A Hudson from No. 233 then arrived and attacked the U-boat, which returned fire with anti-aircraft guns. A depth-charge attack upon the U-boat from the No. 233 aircraft destroyed the German submarine and the kill was accredited to both No. 48 and No. 233 Squadron. On 5 April 1940 another Hudson from No. 233 Squadron attacked and damaged U-167 off the Canary Islands. It is likely that this was the same U-boat that was sunk later that day by another aircraft from the squadron. Two days later, on 7 April, U-447 was sunk by the squadron.

During the summer of 1943, No. 233 Squadron shot down at least two FW-200 Condors. Around this time the squadron's Hudsons were mounted with rockets which gave them greater firepower when engaging U-boats that remained surfaced to fight off the attacking aircraft. In December a Hudson from the squadron used its rockets to sink U-667, which had been spotted by a Vickers Wellington from No. 179 Squadron and captured in the Wellington's Leigh Light.

From October 1943 to February 1944 a detachment from No. 233 was based in the Azores until the squadron was recalled to the UK. The reduction of U-boat activity in the area, following Allied successes on land, led to Nos. 48 and 233 Squadrons returning to the UK in early 1944, to become transportation units.

==== Transport Command ====
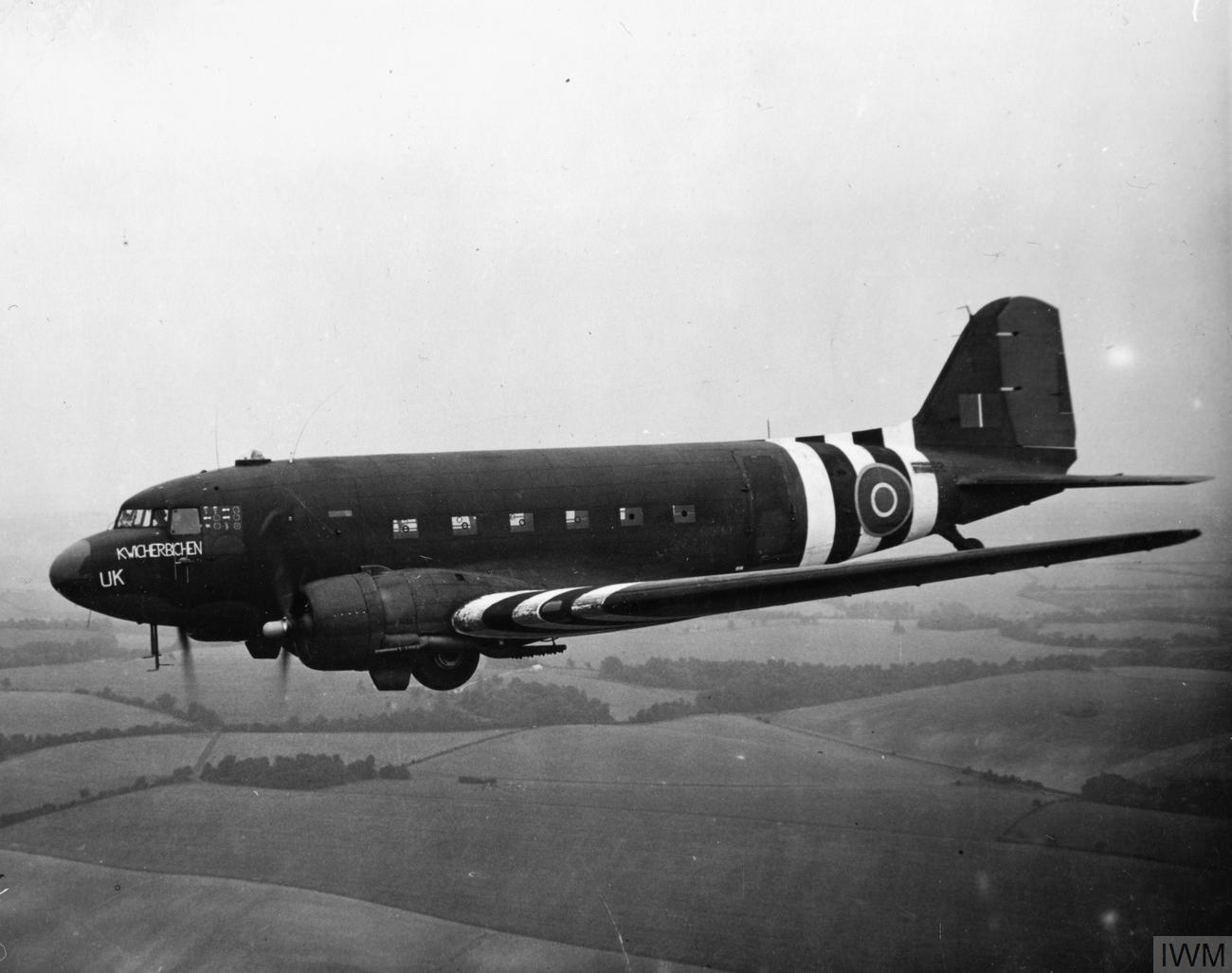
Douglas Dakota Mark III, FZ692 '5T-UK' "Kwicherbichen", of No. 233 Squadron RAF based at RAF Blakehill Farm. The aircraft is returning to the United Kingdom with wounded from the Normandy battlefront. Invasion stripes are painted on the side of the aircraft.

On its return to the UK No. 233 Squadron was equipped with Douglas Dakotas for use with airborne forces, as part of RAF Transport Command. A company of paratroops from the 1st Canadian Parachute Battalion was attached to the squadron to aid in its few months of training, On D-Day there were thirty Dakotas from No. 233, and a few Ansons. Of the Dakotas on the first lift, six were used to tow gliders, the remainder carried troops from the 3rd Parachute Brigade. Later in the day the squadron flew twenty-one supply flights, losing four aircraft. After flying evacuation missions from the beachhead, No. 233 flew thirty-seven sorties during the Arnhem airlift during its first few days. Thirty-five re-supply sorties followed in which the squadron lost three aircraft.

The squadron then flew general transport flights between the UK and occupied Europe until twenty-four Dakotas were used for the last major offensive over the Rhine in March 1945. In August No. 233 began to move to India, though the Japanese surrendered before the squadron had fully assembled there. After flying general transport sorties in South East Asia the squadron was merged with No. 215 Squadron RAF in December 1945.

==== Notable pilots ====
At least five pilots of the squadron were decorated during the Second World War. Arthur Terence Maudsley was a sergeant in the early days of the war, and was awarded the Distinguished Flying Medal before being commissioned as a pilot officer on 22 June 1940. He was then, whilst flying with 233 Squadron, awarded the Distinguished Flying Cross (DFC) on 24 December 1940. Maudsley was later promoted to flying officer and then flight lieutenant. He was a squadron leader with No. 779 Squadron RAF when he was killed on 7 September 1943.

A Canadian, Everett Large Baudoux became a pilot officer on probation in November 1939, and was confirmed in that rank in March 1940. He was promoted to flying officer on 5 November 1940, and was with 233 Squadron when he was awarded the DFC on 17 January 1941. In November that year he was promoted to flight lieutenant. Baudoux was an acting squadron leader (still with 233 Squadron) when he was awarded the Distinguished Service Order (DSO) on 20 April 1943. He transferred to the Royal Canadian Air Force on 3 May 1945.

John William Barling also started in the ranks, being a flight sergeant when he was commissioned as a pilot officer on 1 May 1942. He was awarded the DFC with 233 Squadron on 16 February 1943, having been promoted to flying officer in November 1942. He was promoted to flight lieutenant in May 1944. In 1945, by then with No. 224 Squadron RAF, Barling was awarded the DSO. After the war he took a permanent commission as a flying officer, and was promoted to substantive flight lieutenant in 1946. Promoted to squadron leader in 1951, he retired in that rank in 1963, but took a reserve commission as a flying officer in the Training Branch in 1965. He resigned this commission in 1971.

Alastair Cavendish Lindsay Mackie was commissioned as a pilot officer on probation in May 1941, and was promoted to flying officer in May 1942. In April 1943 he was awarded the DFC whilst flying with No. 178 Squadron RAF, before being promoted to flight lieutenant in May. In December 1944 he was awarded a bar to the DFC whilst flying with 233 Squadron. Mackie took a permanent commission as a flight lieutenant at the end of the war, was promoted to squadron leader in 1950. In the Coronation Honours List of 1953 he was awarded the Queen's Commendation for Valuable Service in the Air. He was promoted to wing commander in 1956, group captain in 1961, and air commodore in 1966, having also been made a Commander of the Order of the British Empire (CBE). He retired on 30 September 1968.

Peter Ian Burden was also a flight sergeant before being commissioned as a pilot officer in July 1942. Promoted to flying officer in January 1943, flight lieutenant in July 1944, he was awarded the King's Commendation for Valuable Service in the Air and the DFC (with 233 Squadron) on 29 December 1944. Burden left full-time service after the war, but remained in the Royal Air Force Volunteer Reserve, retaining his rank, he relinquished his commission on 7 September 1953.

=== Post war ===
Squadron was reformed in 1953 as an OCU Operational Conversion Squadron training pilots to convert from prop aircraft to Jet aircraft. Based in South Wales at RAF Pembrey Carmarthenshire.

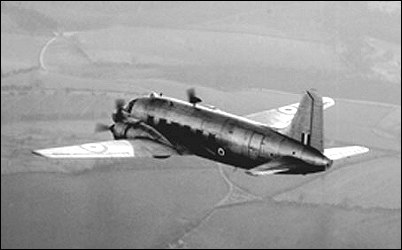
Vickers Valetta transport aircraft. This type of aircraft was used by the squadron in its last years of existence till its disbandment on 31 January 1964.

1952 – 1957 flying De Havilland Vampire Jets

No. 233 Squadron was reformed once more on 1 September 1960 when the Vickers Valetta flight of No. 84 Squadron RAF was detached to form No. 233 at Khormaksar. The squadron was then used to provide general transport for the British Army in the Aden Protectorate. During November/December 1961 the Squadron took part in the Juba River flood relief effort in Somalia, with Valettas flying the supply drops.

It was disbanded on 31 January 1964.

== Squadron bases ==
Squadron bases	Date
Dover	31 August 1918 – March 1919
RAF Walmer	March 1919-15 May 1919
RAF Tangmere	18 May 1937
Thornaby	9 July 1937
RAF Leuchars	23 September 1938
RAF Montrose	26 September 1938
RAF Leuchars	6 October 1938
RAF Aldergrove	3 August 1940
RAF Leuchars	14 September 1940
RAF Aldergrove	8 December 1940
RAF St Eval	8 August 1941
RAF Gibraltar (Detachment)	1 December 1941 – July 1942
RAF Thorney Island	2 January 1942
RAF Gibraltar	12 July 1942
Lagens, Azores	23 October 1943 – 24 February 1944
Gosport	(A) 21 February 1944 (C) 29 February 1944
RAF Bircham Newton (G)	1 March 1944
RAF Blakehill Farm	5 March 1944
RAF Odiham	8 June 1945
Move to India	15 August 1945
Tulihal RAF Pembrey	1 September 1945 – 15 December 1945 1952 - 1957
RAF Khormaksar	1 September 1960 – 31 January 1964

== Aircraft operated ==
Aircraft	Period of service
Short 184	August 1918 – May 1919
Sopwith Camel	August 1918 – November 1919
Airco DH.4 & Airco DH.9	August 1918 – May 1919
Avro Anson I	May 1937 – December 1939
Lockheed Hudson I, II, III, V	August 1939 – May 1944
Douglas Dakota III	March 1944 – December 1945
DH Vampire T11	1952 - 1957
Vickers Valetta C.1	September 1960 – January 1964

== See also ==
- List of Royal Air Force aircraft squadrons
