= RAF Down Ampney =

Former RAF station in Wiltshire, England

RAF Down Ampney
- Near Down Ampney, Gloucestershire in England
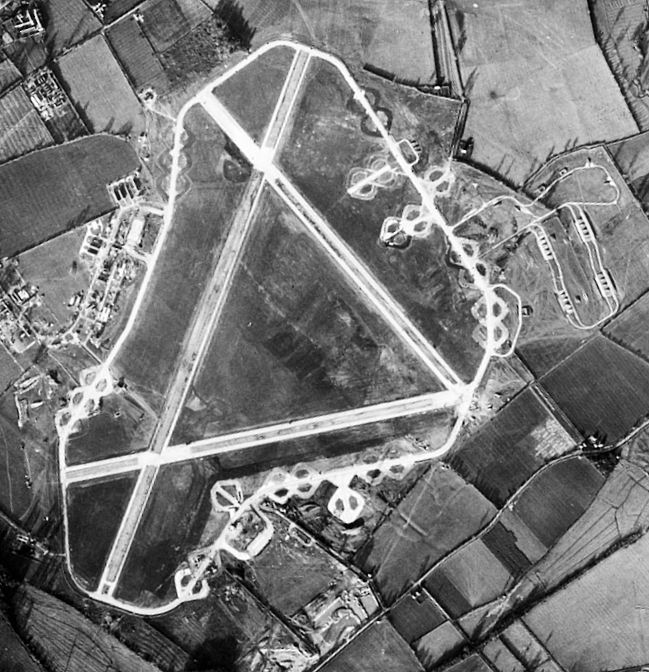
- Aerial photograph of Down Ampney airfield, 4 December 1943. The bomb dump is to the right (east) of the airfield, the technical site and barrack sites are to the left.

Site information
- Type: Royal Air Force station
- Owner: Air Ministry
- Operator: Royal Air Force
- Controlled by: RAF Transport Command

Location
- Shown within Gloucestershire RAF Down Ampney (the United Kingdom)
- Coordinates: 51°40′01″N 01°50′22″W

Site history
- Built: 1943
- In use: 1944 - 1947
- Battles/wars: European theatre of World War II

Airfield information
- Elevation: 82 metres (269 ft) AMSL
Runways
Direction	Length and surface
03/21	1,830 metres (6,004 ft) Asphalt
09/27	1,280 metres (4,199 ft) Asphalt
15/33	1,280 metres (4,199 ft) Asphalt

Royal Air Force Down Ampney or more simply RAF Down Ampney is a former Royal Air Force station located 1.8 miles (2.9 km) north east of Cricklade, Wiltshire and 3 miles (4.8 km) south west of RAF Fairford, Gloucestershire. The airfield operated during the Second World War from February 1944 until February 1947.

Down Ampney was part of a group of airfields dedicated to air transportation, alongside RAF Broadwell and RAF Blakehill Farm.

== Based units ==
No. 48 Squadron RAF and No. 271 Squadron RAF flew Douglas Dakotas on major missions. On D-Day they dropped the main elements of the 3rd Parachute Brigade in Normandy as well as towing Airspeed Horsa gliders across the English Channel. They were also active in Operation Market Garden (Arnhem) and the Rhine crossing. The same squadrons also flew Casevac flights to bring home wounded personnel from B landing grounds and airfields after the D Day landings. These flights took about 80 minutes and included RAF nurses.

== Memorial ==
A memorial has been erected at the southern end of what was the main runway. which reads:

FROM THIS AIRFIELD IN 1944-5

DOUGLAS DAKOTAS FROM 48 AND
271 SQUADRONS RAF TRANSPORT
COMMAND CARRIED THE 1ST AND 6TH
AIRBORNE DIVISIONS UNITS OF
THE AIR DESPATCH REGIMENT
AND HORSA GLIDERS FLOWN BY
THE GLIDER PILOTS REGIMENT TO
NORMANDY – ARNHEM AND ON THE
CROSSING THE RHINE OPERATIONS

WE WILL REMEMBER THEM
