= No. 512 Squadron RAF =

Defunct flying squadron of the Royal Air Force

- Active: 18 June 1943 – 14 March 1946
- Country: United Kingdom
- Branch: Royal Air Force
- Role: Transport; Airborne forces
- Mottos: Latin: Pegasus Militans (Translation: "Pegasus at war")

Insignia
- Squadron Badge heraldry: In front of a horse's head couped, a sword erect, the point upwards
- Squadron Codes: HC (Jun 1943 – Mar 1946)

No. 512 Squadron was a Second World War Royal Air Force transport squadron.

== History ==
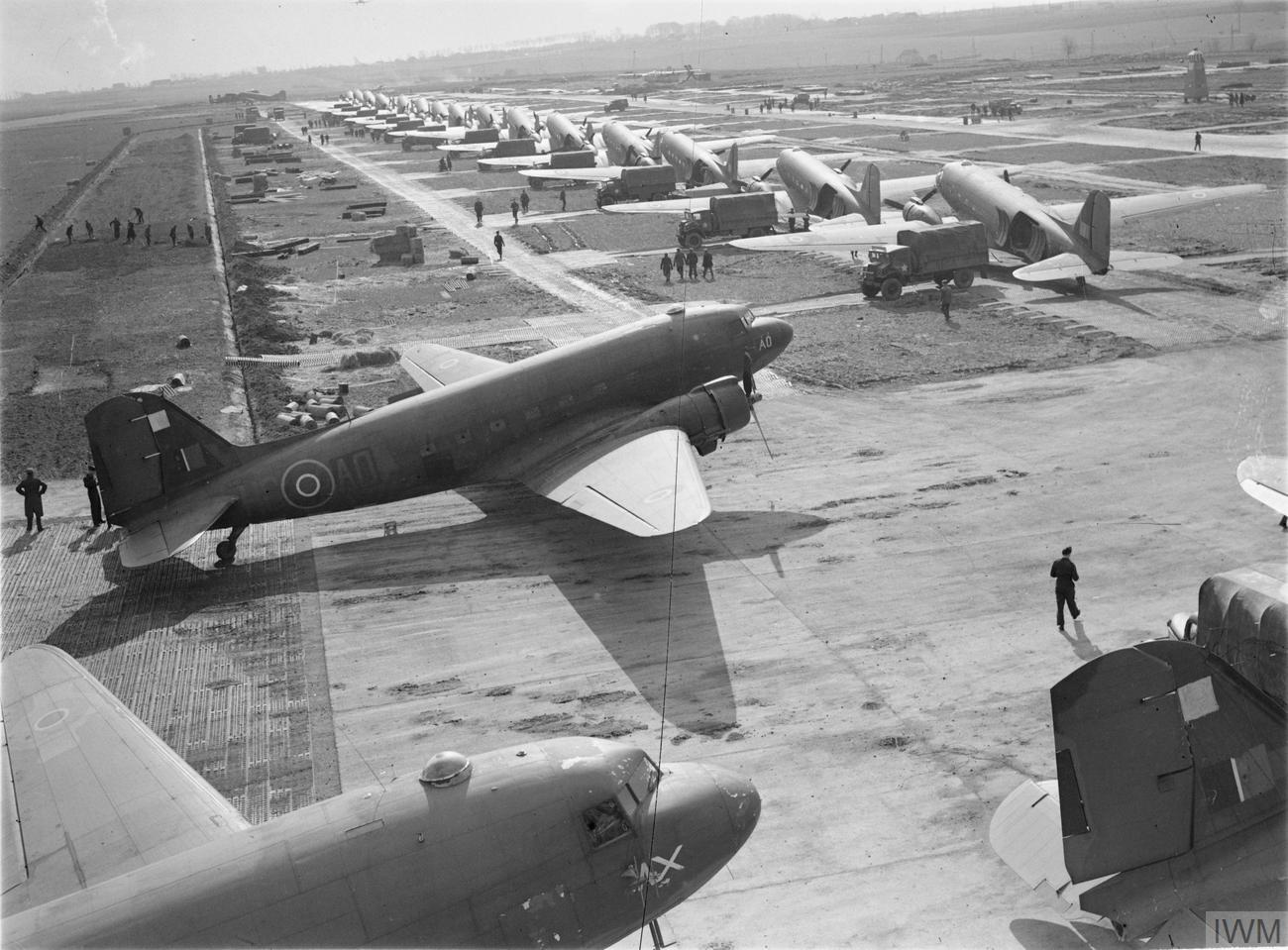
A Dakota, middle foreground, of No. 512 Squadron being unloaded at B56/Evere airfield, Belgium

No. 512 Squadron was formed on 18 June 1943 from the Dakota element of 24 Squadron at RAF Hendon. It operated on supply routes from the United Kingdom to Gibraltar and Algeria to support the campaign in North West Africa. It also flew internal routes within the United Kingdom, and to the Azores and India. In February 1944 the squadron changed role and was transferred to No. 46 Group at RAF Broadwell; it was now a tactical Dakota squadron and started training glider towing and parachute dropping. Its first operation in the new role was a leaflet drop on 5 June 1944 over France, this followed intensive flying in and out of France including dropping parachutists at Arnhem. In fact, 512 Squadron can claim that they were the first planes over on D-Day as three Dakotas piloted by Fl Lt Hyde, W.O. James Proctor and a C Flight Flying Officer dropped a specialist team at 00.02 on 6 June to try to disrupt the Merville Battery before the main assault. It suffered losses during Operation Market Garden and was withdrawn to operate a transport service from Brussels in March 1945, although it was still involved in airborne operations associated with the Rhine crossing. After VE Day in July 1945 it extended its trooping routes to Palestine and the Middle East and moved to RAF Qastina in Palestine in October 1945, moving on by the end of the month to RAF Gianaclis near Alexandria, Egypt. In December 1945 it moved to Bari, to operate scheduled flights within Italy. It returned to the United Kingdom in February 1946 and was disbanded upon arrival on 14 March 1946.

== Aircraft operated ==
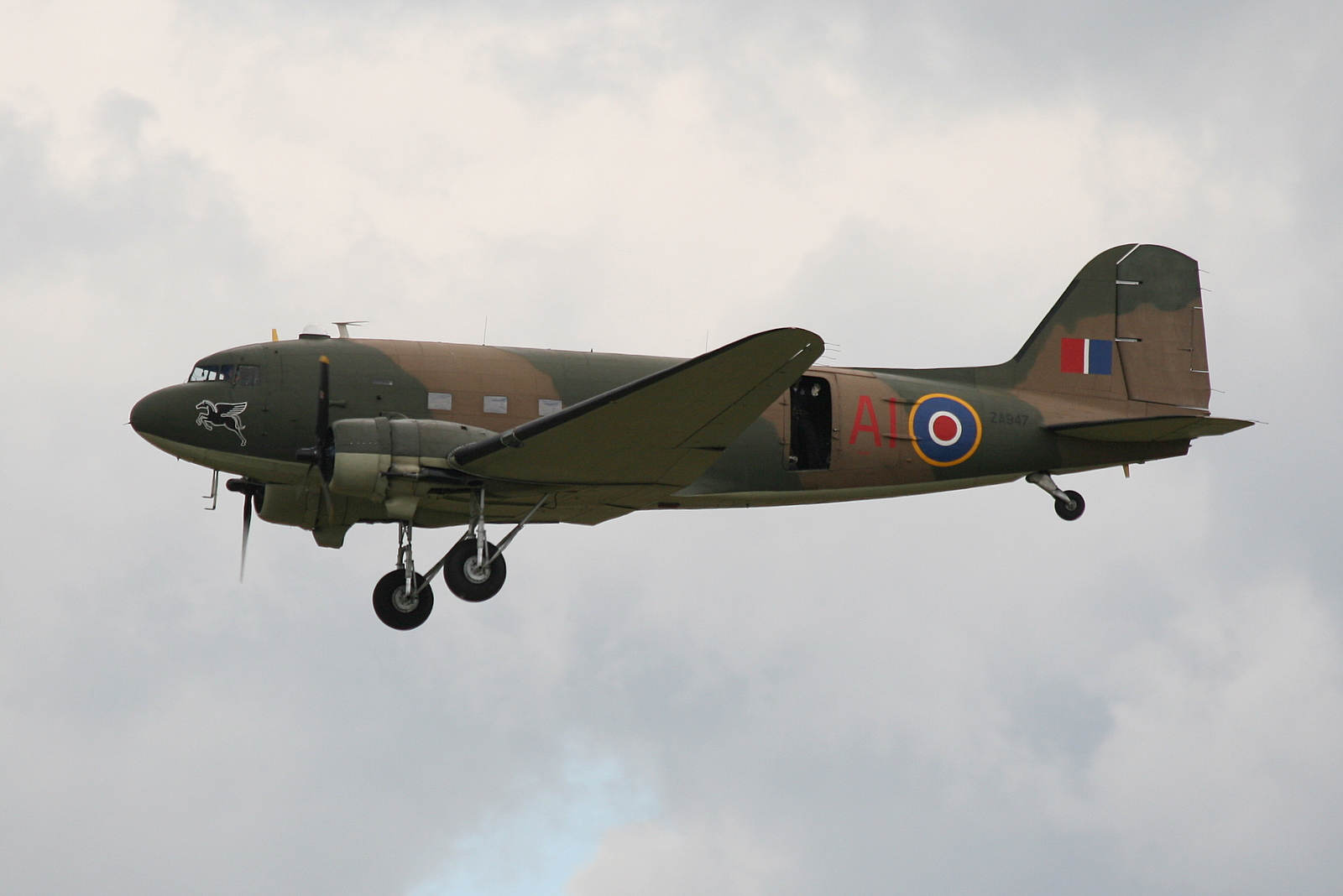
Douglas Dakota

Aircraft operated by no. 512 Squadron RAF, data from
From	To	Aircraft	Version
June 1943	September 1943	Lockheed Hudson	Mk.IIIa
June 1943	March 1946	Douglas Dakota	Mks.I, III
August 1944	1945	Airspeed Oxford, Avro Anson	
April 1945	March 1946	Douglas Dakota	Mk.IV

== Squadron bases ==
Bases and airfields used by no. 512 Squadron RAF, data from
From	To	Base	Remark
18 June 1943	14 February 1944	RAF Hendon, Middlesex	
14 February 1944	31 March 1945	RAF Broadwell, Oxfordshire	
31 March 1945	6 August 1945	B.56/Evère, Belgium	Air echelon till 5 July 1945
6 August 1945	8 October 1945	RAF Holme-on-Spalding Moor, East Riding of Yorkshire	
8 October 1945	24 October 1945	RAF Qastina, Palestine	
24 October 1945	2 December 1945	RAF Gianaclis, Egypt	
2 December 1945	23 February 1946	Bari, Italy	
23 February 1946	14 March 1946	en route to the UK	Disbanded upon arrival

== Commanding officers ==
Officers commanding no. 512 Squadron RAF, data from
From	To	Name
August 1943	September 1943	W/Cdr. M. Booth, DFC
September 1943	December 1943	W/Cdr. K.J.D. Dickson
December 1943	February 1944	W/Cdr. R.M. Blennerhassett
February 1944	January 1945	W/Cdr. B.A. Coventry, DFC
January 1945	July 1945	W/Cdr. R.G. Dutton, DSO, DFC & Bar
July 1945	December 1945	LtCol. P.G.A. McMurdock
December 1945	March 1946	S/Ldr. W.A. Mostyn-Brown

== See also ==
- List of Royal Air Force aircraft squadrons
