= No. 271 Squadron RAF =

Defunct flying squadron of the Royal Air Force

- Active: 27 Sept 1918 – 9 Dec 1918; 1 May 1940 – 1 Dec 1946
- Country: United Kingdom
- Branch: Royal Air Force
- Type: Flying squadron
- Role: Transport
- Part of: RAF Army Cooperation Command; RAF Transport Command
- Garrison/HQ: RAF Doncaster
- Mottos: Death and Life
- Equipment: Douglas Dakota

Insignia
- Squadron codes: BJ (May 1940 – Jan 1944); YS and L7 (Jan 1944 – Dec 1946)

No. 271 Squadron of the Royal Air Force was operational for two periods; a few brief months between 27 September 1918 and 9 December 1918 operating flying boats to protect shipping from German U-boats, and between 28 March 1940 and 1 December 1946 as a transport squadron.

== First World War ==
271 Squadron was formed from Flights 357, 358, and 367 based at the former Royal Naval Air Service station of Otranto in southern Italy. All had been equipped with flying boats or seaplanes, mostly the Felixstowe F.3 and possibly some Short 184s. The mission was to protect shipping from German U-boats; after the Armistice, the unit was quickly disbanded.

== Second World War ==
In May 1940, No. 271 Squadron was created from the former 1680 Flight at RAF Doncaster, in a transport role. Equipment mostly consisted of the Handley Page Harrow, supplemented with the Bristol Bombay and civil airliners impressed into military service, including the Handley Page H.P.42s from Imperial Airways.

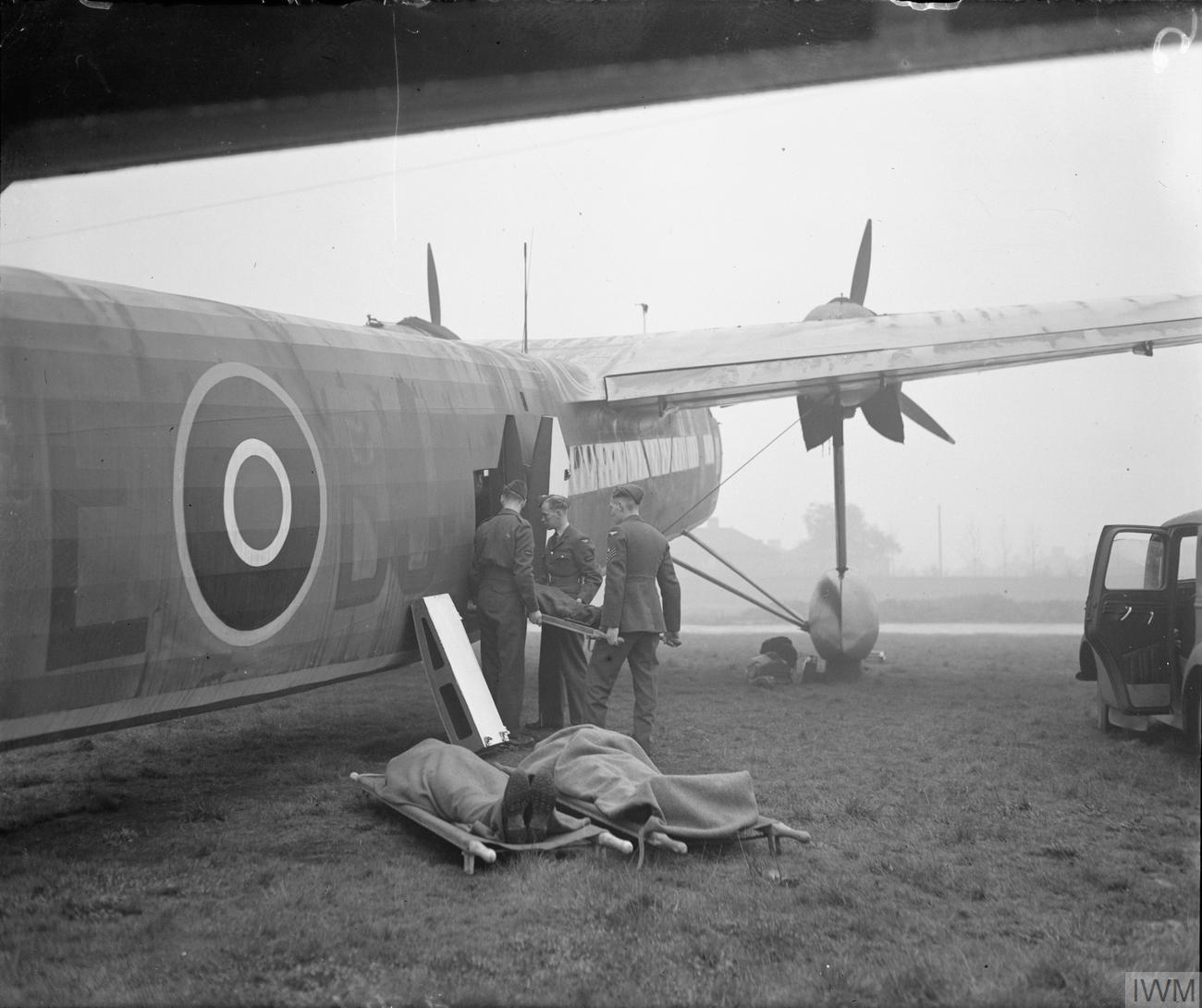
A No. 271 Squadron Handley Page Harrow air ambulance at Hendon

Among the early tasks of the squadron was the support of RAF units in France, and the evacuation of them once the fall of France became inevitable. Following that, they worked mostly within the UK, moving equipment and supplies, especially when RAF fighter squadrons moved airfields. For a while the Squadron operated a detached flight at RAF Wick running a regular service to Reykjavík in Iceland using de Havilland DH.91 Albatross aircraft, but when both were lost this was abandoned, the detached flight instead acquiring de Havilland Dominies, which were used to supply remote Scottish communities.

From 1942 they began an association with the airborne forces and this role would show an increasing prominence in the squadron's mission. Airborne training flights were a commonplace task during 1942 and 1943. The squadron was transferred to the newly formed RAF Transport Command in March 1943, and was re-equipped with Douglas Dakotas from August, although a flight of Harrows were retained as air ambulances. The squadron moved RAF Down Ampney on 29 February 1944.

The squadron took part in the invasion of Normandy in 1944; on D-Day it dropped men of the 3rd Parachute Brigade and towed Airspeed Horsa gliders. Further support for the Allied landings and the battle for France followed, including support for the Battle of Arnhem during Operation Market Garden. During this operation, one of the squadron's pilots Flight Lieutenant David Lord was awarded a posthumous Victoria Cross for gallantry in continuing his mission after his aircraft had been severely damaged and crashed soon after killing Lord and all his crew except one. This was the only award of the Victoria Cross to a member of Transport Command. Another pilot of the squadron who was awarded the Distinguished Flying Cross during Operation Market Garden was the post-war entertainer Jimmy Edwards.

After the war, the squadron continued its supply role for a time, before being renumbered as No. 77 Squadron on 1 December 1946.
