= RAF Abingdon =

Former Royal Air Force station in Oxfordshire, England

RAF Abingdon
- Near Abingdon, Oxfordshire in England
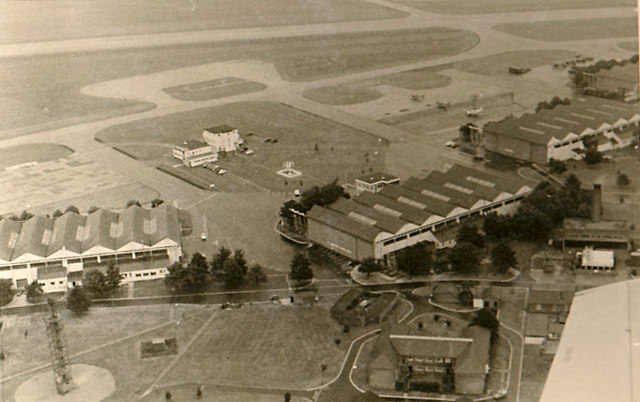
- An aerial view of RAF Abingdon circa 1972.

- Proudly

Site information
- Type: Royal Air Force station
- Code: AB
- Owner: Ministry of Defence
- Operator: Royal Air Force
- Controlled by: RAF Bomber Command * No. 6 Group RAF * No. 91 (OTU) Group RAF; RAF Transport Command
- Condition: Closed

Location
- Location in Oxfordshire
- Coordinates: 51°41′N 001°19′W
- Area: 288 hectares

Site history
- Built: 1931
- In use: September 1932 – 31 July 1992
- Fate: Transferred to the British Army and became Dalton Barracks. Airfield continued to be used as a satellite station for RAF helicopter training.
- Battles/wars: European theatre of World War II; Cold War

Airfield information
- Identifiers: IATA: ABB, ICAO: EGUD
- Elevation: 75 metres (246 ft) AMSL
Runways
| Direction | Length and surface |
|---|---|
| 18/36 | 1,802 metres (5,912 ft) Concrete |
| 08/26 | 1,067 metres (3,501 ft) Concrete |

Royal Air Force Abingdon or more simply RAF Abingdon is a former Royal Air Force station near Abingdon, Oxfordshire. It is now known as Dalton Barracks and is used by the Royal Logistic Corps.

== History ==
In 1925, a plan was approved to build an airfield near Abingdon, south west of Oxford, which would be suitable as a base for light bombers. Construction began in 1929, and the RAF station was formally opened on 1 September 1932. 40 Squadron, a light bomber squadron equipped with the Fairey Gordon arrived on 8 October that year, with Oxford University Air Squadron moving in during November. On 16 November 1933 HQ Central Area moved to RAF Abingdon. The Hawker Hart-equipped 15 Squadron reformed at Abingdon in June 1934, bringing the station up to its designed peacetime establishment of two squadrons. 40 Squadron re-equipped with Harts in 1935. In 1936, the RAF began a major expansion of its strength, with a flight of 40 Squadron being detached to form the nucleus of 104 Squadron in January, and 98 Squadron similarly created from a flight of 15 Squadron in February. Central Area was disbanded by being renamed No. 1 (Bomber) Group RAF on 1 May 1936, which became part of RAF Bomber Command on 14 July 1936.

98 and 104 Squadrons moved out of Abingdon to RAF Hucknall in August 1936, but the expansion process continued, with 52 Squadron being split off from 15 Squadron in January 1937 before moving to RAF Upwood in March, and 62 Squadron being split from 40 Squadron in May, moving to RAF Cranfield in July. In March 1938, 185 Squadron was split off from 40 Squadron, with 106 Squadron split off from 15 Squadron in June 1938. The Abingdon-based squadrons re-equipped with the Fairey Battle monoplane light bomber in July 1938, before 106 and 185 Squadrons moved to RAF Thornton in August and September that year. 103 Squadron moved to Abingdon to equip with Battles in September 1938, before transferring to RAF Benson in April 1939.

=== Second World War ===
Orders arrived on 24–25 August 1939 to mobilise the squadrons at Abingdon prior to proceeding to France as part of the Advanced Air Striking Force (AASF). On receipt of orders to move to France, Headquarters No. 1 Group became Headquarters AASF and the station headquarters and the two Fairey Battle squadrons (15 and 40 Squadrons) at Abingdon became No. 71 (Bomber) Wing RAF, departing for France on 2 September.

In September 1939, two squadrons (97 Squadron and 166 Squadron), both equipped with the Armstrong Whitworth Whitley bomber and serving as training squadrons for 4 Group's operational squadrons, moved to Abingdon. In April 1940, the two squadrons merged to form No. 10 Operational Training Unit RAF. 10 OTU was based at the airfield from April 1940 until 1946. From 1940 to 1942, Abingdon's station commander was Herbert Massey.

=== 1945–1960 ===
After the Second World War RAF Abingdon became part of RAF Transport Command, and also became the home of No. 1 Parachute Training School RAF which is now stationed at RAF Brize Norton. The Parachute Training School, and RAF Abingdon generally, featured heavily in the 1953 Alan Ladd film The Red Beret (called Paratrooper in the USA), and the Parachute Training School was used as a location for some scenes for the films Carve Her Name With Pride (1958) and Operation Crossbow (1965) as well as the French comedy Babette s'en va-t-en guerre (1959) which starred Brigitte Bardot. On 14 June 1968 Queen Elizabeth II conducted a royal review at RAF Abingdon to mark the 50th anniversary of the RAF.

About 1948–49 Headquarters No. 47 Group RAF, Transport Command, was at RAF Abingdon. The station, its personnel and aircraft (Yorks and Hastings) were involved in the Berlin Airlift.

In 1952 a ferry unit was based at RAF Abingdon. It moved Mosquito, Hornet, Meteor, Vampire and Spitfire aircraft. 15 Sabres were ferried from Canada but only 12 arrived. After checks and servicing the Sabres went to RAF Germany.

In 1953 all flying units dispersed to other units to make way for Nos. 24 and 47 Squadrons operating Handley Page Hastings Mks 1, 2 and 4. The three Mk 4 Hastings ("shiny fleet") belonged to 24 Squadron, serialled WD324, 326 and 500.

Also 1953, RAF Abingdon received the freedom of Abingdon.

On 22 April 1953 the spy George Blake arrived at RAF Abingdon, back from Korea via Moscow and Berlin.

In 1955 47 Squadron changed its Hastings for the Blackburn Beverley. Later 24 Squadron moved to RAF Colerne. It was replaced by No. 53 Squadron RAF operating the Beverley.

In 1956 in support of the R.A.F. relief efforts to Hungarian Freedom Fighters, 47 Squadron Beverley's flew medical, canteen and bedding supplies to Vienna, Austria Nov.7th 1956.

=== 1961–1992 ===
Besides London University Air Squadron, the Oxford University Air Squadron was based at RAF Abingdon. Abingdon was also the home of No. 6 AEF (Air Experience Flight) operating between 6 and 8 DHC Chipmunks for ATC/CCF Air Cadet flight experience training. 6 AEF was one of a very few locations that offered air cadets the "Air Cadet Navigator" training course, leading to the award of Cadet Navigation Wings.

In the late 1960s the Blackburn Beverleys' hangars had dormer extensions put in the roof to take the extra height of the tailplane of the Short Belfasts of No. 47 Squadron. Once the nose of the Belfast was in the hangar the nose had to be lifted to get the tail fin under the lip of the roof. The nose was then lowered and the tail fin rose up into the dormer roof for that parking position. No. 46 Squadron was also at Abingdon at this time flying Hawker Siddeley Andovers, one of their roles being to support UK MAMS (United Kingdom Mobile Air Movements). A small Army Air Dispatch unit was also supported by the airfield at this time.

From 1975 through to the 1990s, Abingdon became a maintenance field, with the AMS (Aircraft Maintenance Squadron) servicing:

- SEPECAT Jaguar; the last Jaguar to undergo major maintenance here left during April 1992.
- Hawker Hunter
- Blackburn Buccaneer from September 1987, previously at St Athan.
- BAE Hawk which were maintained by the Hawk Major Maintenance Flight, which had formed in January 1982.

In the early 80s the Battle of Britain Memorial Flight's Lancaster bomber spent a couple of winters at RAF Abingdon to undergo major refurbishment. During this period, RAF Abingdon was also home to the Field Repair Squadron (later Repair & Salvage Squadron) which included Aircraft Repair Flight, Aircraft Salvage and Transportation Flight (formerly 71 MU "Crash & Smash") and Battle Damage Repair Flight.

From 1986 to 1988 RAF Abingdon became home to the Thames Valley Police Air Support Unit, flying a helicopter on police operations. It was also the home of the University of London Air Squadron in the seventies. An annual airshow took place at RAF Abingdon until the early nineties.

From 1981 many ex-airline Vickers VC10s were stored at the station following their purchase by the MoD. By the early 1990s, the aircraft were either converted to tankers or scrapped. It was intended that the 3 Air Maintenance Support (3 AMS) unit would move from RAF Brize Norton, only a few miles away, to undertake the major servicing of the VC10 military fleet. This would have involved the modification of a number of hangars to raise the roof to allow access for the VC10 high tail section at a cost of £5m, instead this work was moved to St. Athan.

=== Closure ===
In July 1992 a white paper to review defence requirements "Option for Change" recommended the closure of RAF Abingdon and that a new hangar, known as "Twin Peaks" be built at RAF St Athan with the reforming of 3 AMS, from RAF Brize Norton to 1 AMS at RAF St Athan in August 1992.

RAF Abingdon closed on 31 July 1992, with the Oxford and London University Air Squadron and No. 6 Air Experience Flight moving to RAF Benson. The station was transferred to the British Army and it was renamed Dalton Barracks. RAF Benson continues to use Abingdon as a diversion airfield and for helicopter training.

=== Squadrons ===
| Squadron | Equipment | From | To | To | Notes |
|---|---|---|---|---|---|
| No. 15 Squadron RAF | Hawker Hart; Hawker Hind; Fairey Battle | 1 June 1934 | 2 September 1939 | Betheniville | Reformed here. |
| No. 24 Squadron RAF | Handley Page Hastings C.1/C.2/C.4 | 6 May 1953 | 1 January 1957 | RAF Colerne | |
| No. 27 Squadron RAF | No equipment | 1 November 1947 | 24 November 1947 | RAF Oakington | Reformed here. |
| No. 30 Squadron RAF | No equipment | 1 November 1947 | 24 November 1947 | RAF Oakington | Reformed here. |
| No. 30 Squadron RAF | Dakota | 27 November 1950 | 2 May 1952 | | |
| No. 30 Squadron RAF | Vickers Valetta C.1 | 27 November 1950 | 2 May 1952 | RAF Benson | |
| No. 40 Squadron RAF | Gordon; Hart (Special); Hind; Battle | 8 October 1932 | 2 September 1939 | Betheniville | Reformed here. |
| No. 46 Squadron RAF | Dakota; Hawker Siddeley Andover C.1 | 16 December 1946; 1 September 1966 | 24 November 1947; 9 September 1970 | RAF Oakington; RAF Thorney Island | Reformed here. |
| No. 47 Squadron RAF | Hastings C.2; Blackburn Beverley C.1 | 13 May 1953 | 31 October 1967 | Disbanded | |
| No. 51 Squadron RAF | Avro York C.1 | 1 December 1947 | 25 June 1949 | RAF Bassingbourn | |
| No. 52 Squadron RAF | Hind | 18 January 1937 | 1 March 1937 | RAF Upwood | Reformed here. |
| No. 53 Squadron RAF | Hastings C.1/C.2; Beverley C.1 | 1 January 1957 | 30 June 1963 | Disbanded | |
| No. 59 Squadron RAF | York C.1 | 1 December 1947 | 25 June 1949 | RAF Bassingbourn | Detachment at Wunstorf Air Base for the Berlin Airlift. |
| No. 62 Squadron RAF | Hind | 3 May 1937 | 12 July 1937 | RAF Cranfield | Reformed here. |
| No. 63 Squadron RAF | Battle; Avro Anson I | 9 September 1939 | 17 September 1939 | RAF Benson | |
| No. 97 Squadron RAF | Anson I Armstrong Whitworth Whitley II/III | 17 September 1939 | 8 April 1940 | Disbanded | |
| No. 98 Squadron RAF | Hind | 17 February 1936 | 21 August 1936 | RAF Hucknall | Reformed here. |
| No. 103 Squadron RAF | Battle | 15 June 1940 | 18 June 1940 | RAF Honington | |
| No. 104 Squadron RAF | Hind | 7 January 1936 | 21 August 1936 | RAF Hucknall | |
| No. 106 Squadron RAF | Hind; Battle | 1 June 1938 | 1 September 1938 | RAF Thornaby | Reformed here. |
| No. 147 Squadron RAF | No equipment | 1 February 1953 | 16 April 1953 | RAF Benson | Reformed here. |
| No. 166 Squadron RAF | Whitley I/III | 17 September 1939 | 6 April 1940 | Disbanded | Detachment at RAF Jurby. |
| No. 167 Squadron RAF | No equipment | 1 February 1953 | 16 April 1953 | RAF Benson | Reformed here. |
| No. 185 Squadron RAF | Hind; Battle | 1 March 1938 | 1 September 1938 | RAF Thornaby | Detachment at RAF Thornaby. |
| No. 238 Squadron RAF | Dakota | 1 December 1946 | 24 November 1947 | RAF Oakington | Detachment at Schwechat. |
| No. 242 Squadron RAF | York C.1 | 1 December 1947 | 25 June 1949 | RAF Lyneham | Detachment at Wunstorf. |
| No. 525 Squadron RAF | Dakota | 31 October 1946 | 1 December 1946 | Disbanded | Detachment at Schwecat. |

=== Units ===
The following units were also here at some point:

- No. 1 Blind Approach Training Flight RAF (January – October 1941) became No. 1501 (Beam Approach Training) Flight RAF (October 1941 – April 1943)
- No. 1 Group Pool RAF (December 1939 – April 1940)
- No. 1 Parachute School RAF (June 1950 – November 1953) became No. 1 Parachute Training School RAF (November 1953 – December 1975)
- No. 2 (Bomber) Group RAF
- No. 3 (Long-Range) Ferry Unit RAF (1952 – February 1953)
- No. 4 Group Communication Flight RAF (April 1947 – ?)
- No. 4 Group Pool RAF (September 1939 – April 1940)
- No. 4 (Transport) Group RAF (May 1947 – February 1948)
- No. 6 Air Experience Flight RAF (August 1973 – July 1992)
- No. 6 Group Communication Flight RAF (April 1940 – May 1942)
- A detachment of No. 7 Anti-Aircraft Co-operation Unit RAF (June 1940 – June 1942)
- No. 10 Operational Training Unit RAF (April 1940 – September 1946)
- No. 43 Group Communication Flight RAF (1941 – January 1946)
- No. 46 Group RAF (November 1949 – March 1950)
- No. 46 Group Air Transport Examining Unit RAF (September 1972 – October 1973)
- No. 46 Group Communication Flight RAF (November 1949 – March 1950)
- No. 47 Group Communication Flight RAF (April 1948 – November 1949)
- No. 91 Group Communication Flight RAF (May 1942 – April 1947)
- No. 130 Gliding School RAF (November 1946 – April 1951)
- No. 612 Volunteer Gliding School RAF (June 1995–)
- No. 1341 (Special Duties) Flight RAF (June 1944)
- No. 1682 Bomber (Defence) Training Flight RAF (July 1943)
- Advanced Air Striking Force (August 1939 – May 1940)
- Advanced Air Striking Force Communication Flight
- Air Movements Development Unit (November 1959 – May 1965)
- Air Support Command Examining Unit (November 1970 – September 1972)
- Air Transport Development Flight (March 1950 – June 1965) became Air Transport Development Unit (June 1965 – January 1968)
- Andover Training Flight RAF (July 1966 – September 1970)
- Ferry Training Unit RAF (August 1952 – April 1953)
- Joint Air Transport Establishment (April 1971 – July 1976)
- Overseas Ferry Unit RAF (March 1951 – February 1953)
- Oxford University Air Squadron (November 1932 – September 1939), (September 1975 – July 1992)
- Southampton University Air Squadron (April – November 1942)
- Transport Command Air Support Flight (January 1953 – September 1954) became No. 1312 (Transport Support) Flight RAF (September 1954 – April 1957)
- Transport Command Development Flight
- Transport Command Development Unit (July 1949 – February 1950)
- Transport Command Training and Development Flight (October 1951 – January 1956)
- University of London Air Squadron (July 1992 – November 1995)

== Accidents and incidents ==
The operational training unit at RAF Abingdon suffered numerous air crashes from 1939 to 1946. Many of the crashes were close to the airfield.

- On 17 January 1941 Armstrong Whitworth Whitley V N1494 was taking off from Abingdon for a night training flight despite there being a snowstorm. The aircraft crashed in Wootton Road, killing the pilot and three other members of the crew. Two other crewmen parachuted to safety. The survivors reported that ice had caused one engine to fail.
- On 5 July 1941 Armstrong Whitworth Whitley V Z6667 was on a night training flight from Abingdon when it crashed at Chiselhampton. The cause was variously attributed to either a Luftwaffe night fighter or friendly fire by a local anti-aircraft unit. All six crew were killed.
- On 22 June 1953 Handley Page Hastings WJ335 stalled and crashed on takeoff at RAF Abingdon. The elevator control locks had been left engaged. All six crew were killed.
- On 5 March 1957 a 53 Squadron Blackburn Beverley took off from the airfield but suffered fuel starvation, tried to turn back and crashed at Sutton Wick 2 miles (3 km) from the airfield. Three crew, 15 passengers (including RAF Police and six of their dogs) and two civilians on the ground were killed.
- On 6 July 1965 another RAF Handley Page Hastings took off for a parachute drop but crashed at Little Baldon, killing all 41 people aboard.
- On 23 September 1988 a Lockheed S-3 Viking failed to stop on the runway, skidded across the grass and came to a stop on Barrow road to the south of the airfield, while ferrying from USS Theodore Roosevelt. No crew members were injured.
- On 23 September 1988 a McDonnell Douglas Phantom FGR2 crashed at the airfield while practising for the annual airshow, killing both crew (Flt Lt Chris Lackman & Flt Lt Jack Thompson).
- On 14 September 1989 a Panavia Tornado crashed near the airfield.
- On 14 June 2009 an RAF Grob Tutor and a civilian glider crashed near the airfield, killing an Air Training Corps cadet and an instructor. The glider pilot parachuted from his aircraft in time and was unharmed.
- On 14 May 2017 a Silence Twister aerobatics plane crashed whilst performing a display at an airshow. The pilot was injured but made a full recovery.
