= RAF Filton =

Former RAF base in Gloucestershire, England

RAF Filton RFC Filton
- Near Filton, Gloucestershire in England

Site information
- Type: Royal Air Force station
- Owner: Air Ministry
- Operator: Royal Air Force
- Controlled by: RAF Fighter Command 1939-41 * No. 10 Group RAF * No. 11 Group RAF; RAF Transport Command 1941- * No. 44 Group RAF

Location
- Shown within Gloucestershire RAF Filton (Bristol) RAF Filton (the United Kingdom)
- Coordinates: 51°31′09″N 002°34′43″W

Site history
- Built: 1915
- In use: 1916-1957
- Battles/wars: First World War; European theatre of World War II; Cuban Missile Crisis

Airfield information
- Elevation: 64 metres (210 ft) AMSL
Runways
Direction	Length and surface
11/27	1,994 metres (6,542 ft) Concrete
00/00	Concrete

Royal Air Force Filton or more simply RAF Filton is a former Royal Flying Corps (RFC) and Royal Air Force (RAF) station located 5 miles (8 km) north of the city centre of Bristol, England.

Throughout its existence, RAF Filton shared Filton Airfield with the Bristol Aeroplane Company (later British Aircraft Corporation) whose works, now owned by BAE/Airbus, are situated on the south side of the main runway.

== History ==
=== First World War ===
The first squadron to form at the airfield during the First World War was No. 33 Squadron RFC which formed during January 1916 and was composed of elements of No. 20 Squadron RFC which flew the Royal Aircraft Factory B.E.2. The next squadron was 42 Squadron which moved to Filton during April 1916 from crews of 19 Squadron and again flew the B.E.2.

Then No. 66 (Fighter) Squadron was formed in June 1916 with Sopwith Pup biplanes before the squadron moved on to France in March 1917. The squadron was joined by 62 Squadron in August 1916 when the squadron was formed from elements of No. 7 Training Squadron which were equipped with the Bristol F.2 Fighter from May 1917.

=== Between the wars ===
No. 101 Squadron RAF was disbanded at Filton following its return from France in March 1919 where it had flown the Royal Aircraft Factory F.E.2 as a night bomber squadron. In June 1929 No. 501 (Special Reserve) Squadron RAF was formed at Filton as a day bomber squadron flying Airco DH.9A biplanes. Initially named 'City of Bristol' it was renamed 'County of Gloucester' Squadron in May 1930. It became part of the Auxiliary Air Force in 1936. The Squadron flew Hawker Harts and then the Hawker Hind light bomber from 1938.

=== Second World War ===
During the Second World War it was home to the Filton Sector Operations Room which was part of No. 10 Group RAF of RAF Fighter Command.

The first unit to use the airfield was No. 935 (County of Glamorgan) Barrage Balloon Unit (Auxiliary Air Force), which was at Filton from January 1939 with 2 Flights of 8 barrage balloons, and responsible for the defence of the Naval Yard at Plymouth as well as the airfield at Filton. The unit's allocation was increased to 24 Balloons during August 1940 as RAF Filton did not have a defensive fighter squadron attached to defend the airfield. No. 11 Balloon Centre at RAF Pucklechurch, north of Bristol, also came under the command of the RAF Filton station commander.

Squadrons stationed at RAF Filton from the beginning of the Second World War included 501 (County of Gloucester) Sqdn (Auxiliary Air Force), now flying Hawker Hurricane Ic fighters, until 10 May 1940 when the Squadron moved to France; and 263 Squadron (reformed on 2 October 1939 at Filton) taking over some of the Gloster Gladiator I biplane fighters previously with No. 605 Squadron RAF and still wearing that squadron's code letter (HE). The Squadron went on to Norway in April 1940 operating from a frozen lake.

Between May and June 1940, No. 236 Squadron was based at Filton with Bristol Blenheim twin-engined fighters, flying defensive sweeps over the Channel.

In February 1941 No. 118 Squadron RAF was reformed at Filton flying Supermarine Spitfire Is until April 1941.

Also in February 1941, Bristol University Air Squadron (UAS) was formed at Filton as part of 54 Group (along with Birmingham UAS). Initially flying the de Havilland Moth and later de Havilland Tiger Moth and North American Harvard trainers. It continued at Filton until it was disbanded in 1946.

No. 528 Squadron RAF was formed at Filton in June 1943, flying the Bristol Blenheim and de Havilland Hornet Moth in the radar calibration role.

During the Second World War the Station Warrant Officer at Filton was Alec (Tubby) Kerr. Described in the Bristol Evening World in 1957 as one of the best-known Station Warrant Officers the RAF has ever known. SWO Kerr was awarded the MBE on 13 June 1946.

The following units were also here at some point:

- No. 2 Elementary and Reserve Flying Training School RAF (1935–39) became No. 2 Elementary Flying Training School RAF (1939-??)
- No. 2 Ferry Pilots Pool RAF (1939-??)
- No. 4 (Continental) Ferry Pilots Pool RAF
- No. 4 Ferry Pilots Pool RAF
- No. 7 Radio Maintenance Unit Calibration Flight RAF (1940) became No. 7 Radio Servicing Section Calibration Flight RAF (1940–41) became No. 76 (Signals) Wing Calibration Flight RAF (1941–43)
- No. 8 Anti-Aircraft Co-operation Unit RAF
- No. 10 Elementary and Reserve Flying Training School RAF (1936–39) became No. 10 Elementary Flying Training School RAF (1939-??)
- No. 10 Group Anti-Aircraft Co-operation Flight RAF (1941) became No. 286 Squadron RAF
- No. 10 Group Target Towing Flight RAF
- No. 78 (Signals) Wing Calibration Flight RAF (1941-??)
- No. 110 (Anti-Aircraft Co-operation) Wing RAF (??-1941)
- Centaurus Flight RAF (??-1945)
- 2 Ferry Training Flight of the Ferry Training Unit RAF (1942)
- Overseas Aircraft Preparation Unit RAF (1941–42) became No. 2 Overseas Aircraft Preparation Unit RAF (1942–44) became No. 2 Aircraft Preparation Unit RAF (1944–45) became No. 15 Ferry Unit RAF (1945)

==== The Filton 'Blitz' ====
The airfield was attacked on 25 September 1940 just before mid-day by 58 Heinkel He 111 bombers with Messerschmitt Bf 110 fighter escort. The Luftwaffe raid was primarily aimed at the Bristol Aeroplane Company's works on the south side of the airfield. One of the air raid shelters on the airfield received a direct hit, five others seriously damaged and during the raid over 200 people were killed. Luftwaffe reconnaissance planes had determined that there were no fighter aircraft stationed at Filton prior to the attack but No. 504 (County of Nottingham) Squadron RAF (Auxiliary Air Force) was moved in from 26 September 1940, flying Hawker Hurricane Mk1 fighters, as a result of this raid.

=== Post war years ===
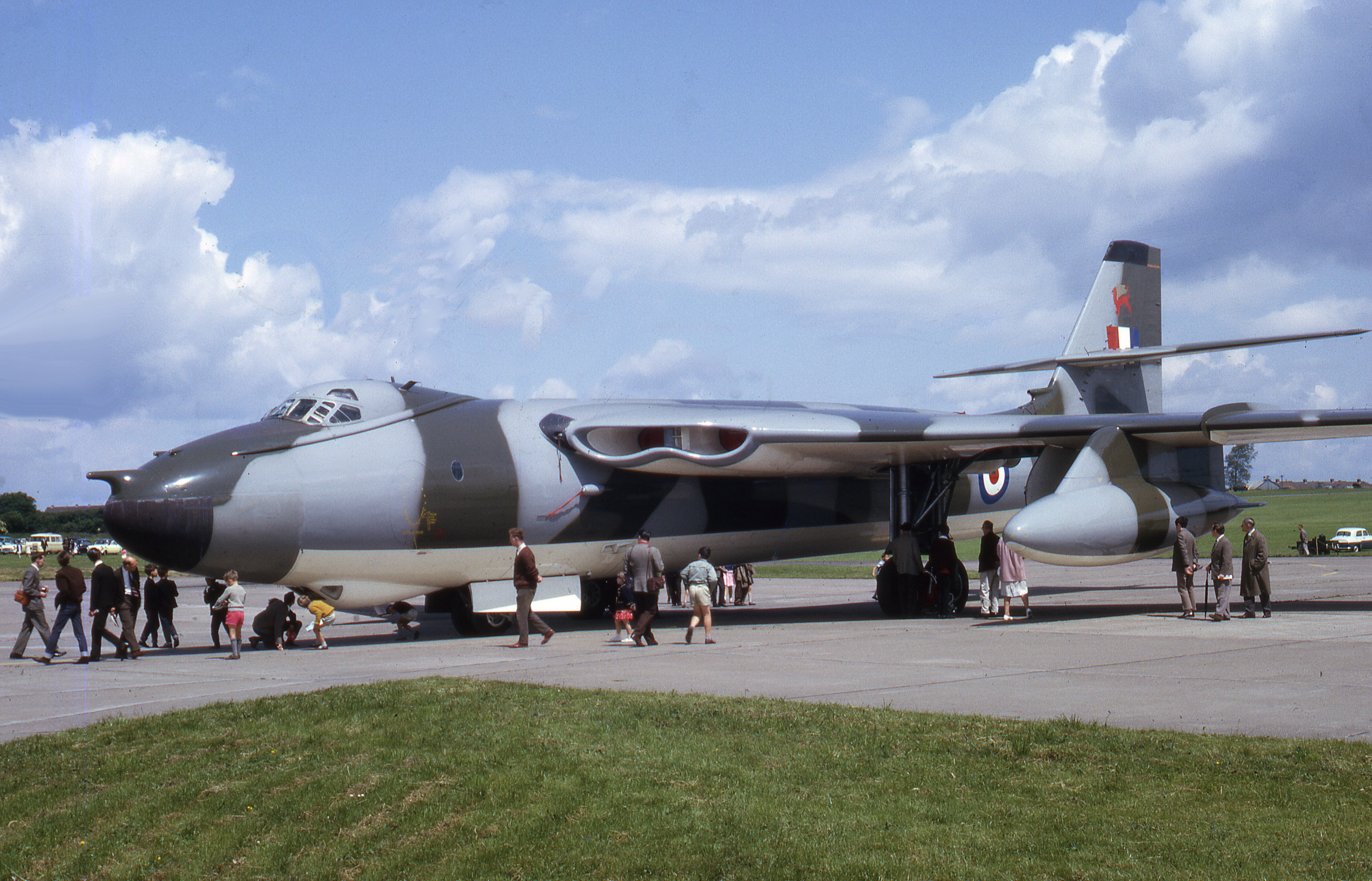
Camouflaged Vickers Valiant at Filton. Date uncertain but probably the mid-1960s

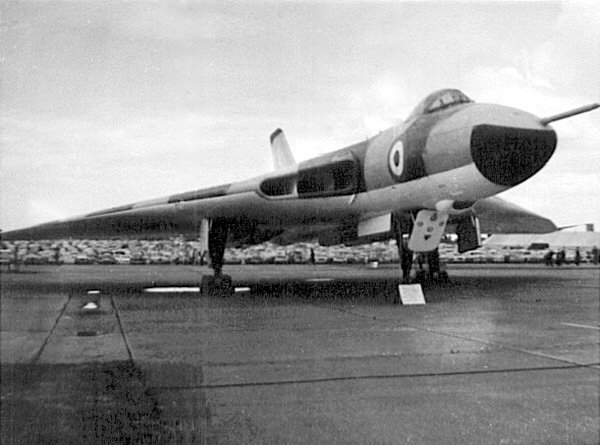
An Avro Vulcan B1A V bomber parked on one of the four rapid dispersal points at Filton during a public air display in the 1960s

After the war years Filton again became home to No. 501 Squadron RAF, which was reformed in May 1946 as a Royal Auxiliary Air Force day-fighter squadron equipped with Spitfire XVI (LF)s. These were followed in 1948 by de Havilland Vampire F1s, and the FB5 from Spring 1951. 501 Squadron continued at Filton until it was disbanded in March 1957, when the remaining Royal Auxiliary Air Force flying units were stood down.

Filton was also once again home to the Bristol University Air Squadron as part of 62 Group. Initially flying de Havilland Tiger Moth T2s, these were replaced with de Havilland Canada DHC-1 Chipmunk T10 trainers; and also No. 3 Air Experience Flight RAFVR which was formed on 8 September 1958, also with de Havilland Chipmunk trainers.

Operating out of Filton from 1948 was No. 12 Reserve Flying School RAF (RFS) equipped with six de Havilland Tiger Moths for RAF Reserve Pilot training and (from 1949) initially two (later three) Avro Ansons for Navigator training. This school was operated under special contract to the Air Ministry by the Bristol Aeroplane Company as part of the Volunteer Reserve Pilot training scheme. This continued until March 1953 when No. 12 RFS closed.

In the 1950s and early '60s, Filton was designated as a V bomber dispersal base. During the Cuban Missile Crisis (October 1962) Avro Vulcan V bombers were at Filton and kept at 'immediate readiness' status with engines idling.

== After closure ==
After closure of the RAF station, civilian use of the airfield continued as Filton Airport. The airfield is now closed and the last aircraft to operate from the site were the helicopters of the National Police Air Service and Great Western Air Ambulance Charity, which both moved to a nearby, purpose-built site at Almondsbury in October 2018. As of 2026, construction work is underway on redevelopment of the airfield as Brabazon, a new mixed-use residential neighbourhood.

In 2017, some of the former RAF buildings became home to Aerospace Bristol, an aerospace museum run by the Bristol Aero Collection Trust. A varied collection of exhibits is housed in the former RAF hangars (now grade II listed). The exhibition covers over 100 years of aviation history with emphasis on items relating to Filton, including Concorde 216, the final Concorde to be built and the last to fly, in a newly built structure.
