= No. 622 Squadron RAuxAF =

No. 622 Squadron RAF
- Active: 10 August 1943 – 15 August 1945; 15 December 1950 – 30 September 1953; 1 October 2012 – present
- Country: United Kingdom
- Branch: Royal Auxiliary Air Force
- Role: Reserve Aircrew
- Base: RAF Brize Norton
- Mottos: Latin: Bellamus Noctu ("We wage war by night")

Commanders
- Current commander: Wg Cdr D James

Insignia
- Squadron Badge heraldry: A long-eared owl volant affrontée, carrying in the claws a flash of lightning
- Squadron Codes: GI (August 1943 – April 1945)

No. 622 Squadron RAF is a reserve aircrew squadron of the Royal Auxiliary Air Force. During World War II, it operated as a bomber squadron of the Royal Air Force. Post-war it served shortly as a transport squadron in the RAuxAF.

== History ==
=== World War II ===
No. 622 Squadron was first formed at RAF Mildenhall in Suffolk on 10 August 1943, equipped with Stirling Mk.III bombers, as part of 3 Group in Bomber Command. It re-equipped with Lancaster Mk.III bombers in December, after briefly operating Lancaster Mk.Is that month. It operated in Bomber Command's Main Force as part of No 3 Group until April 1945 when it moved to humanitarian duties dropping food to the Dutch (Operation Manna), repatriating POWs (Operation Exodus) and ferrying troops home from Italy. The Squadron was disbanded at Mildenhall on 15 August 1945.

=== 1950 to 1953 ===
Unlike many of its contemporaries 622 Squadron was reformed post-war as a Royal Auxiliary Air Force transport squadron at RAF Blackbushe on 15 December 1950. It now operated Valettas and consisted of a nucleus of regular officers who would be supplemented by personnel drawn from locally-based air charter operator Airwork Ltd. This arrangement proved to be unsuccessful however, and the squadron was disbanded on 30 September 1953.

== Current role ==
Originally formed as 1359 Flight RAF, it was attached to a Hercules OCU (Operational Conversion Unit, by this time the former No. 242 Operational Conversion Unit RAF had become No. 57 Squadron RAF), based at RAF Lyneham in Wiltshire in 1994 for a 3-year trial period. After the success of the trial, its role expanded over the years to provide aircrews to all air transport and air-to-air refuelling aircraft of the RAF. It moved to RAF Brize Norton in 2011. On 1 October 2012, in recognition of its continued work with the main squadrons, the flight was authorised by the Standing Committee of the Royal Air Force to be rebadged as 622 (Reserve Aircrew) Squadron.

According to its website, the mission statement is as follows:

To provide aircrews to the Air Transport and Air-to-Air Refuelling Forces either on call-out in times of crisis and war, or to provide peacetime support to maintain the operational capability of the RAF multi-engine squadrons

== Aircraft operated ==
Aircraft operated by no. 622 Squadron RAF, data from
| From | To | Aircraft | Version |
|---|---|---|---|
| August 1943 | December 1943 | Short Stirling | Mk.III |
| December 1943 | August 1945 | Avro Lancaster | Mks.I, III |
| December 1950 | September 1953 | Vickers Valetta | C.1 |

== Squadron bases ==
Bases used by no. 622 Squadron RAF, data from
| From | To | Base |
|---|---|---|
| 10 August 1943 | 15 August 1945 | RAF Mildenhall, Suffolk |
| 15 December 1950 | 30 September 1953 | RAF Blackbushe, Hampshire |
| 1994 | June 2011 | RAF Lyneham, Wiltshire |
| June 2011 | Present | RAF Brize Norton, Oxfordshire |
