= RAF Blackbushe =

Former Royal Air Force station in Hampshire, England

RAF Blackbushe RAF Hartford Bridge
- Near Blackbushe, Hampshire in England

Site information
- Type: Royal Air Force station
- Code: XB
- Owner: Air Ministry
- Operator: Royal Air Force
- Controlled by: RAF Army Cooperation Command 1942-43 * No. 70 Group RAF; RAF Second Tactical Air Force * No. 2 Group RAF * No. 85 Group RAF; RAF Transport Command * No. 46 Group RAF

Location
- Shown within Hampshire RAF Blackbushe (the United Kingdom)
- Coordinates: 51°19′31″N 0°50′48″W

Site history
- Built: 1941/42
- Built by: Sir Alfred McAlpine Ltd
- In use: November 1942 - November 1946
- Battles/wars: European theatre of World War II

Airfield information
- Elevation: 320 feet (98 m) AMSL
Runways
| Direction | Length and surface |
|---|---|
| 00/00 | Concrete |
| 00/00 | Concrete |
| 00/00 | Concrete |

Royal Air Force Blackbushe or more simply RAF Blackbushe is a former Royal Air Force station in Hampshire, England, during the Second World War. It is now Blackbushe Airport.

== History ==
The station was opened on 1 November 1942 as RAF Hartford Bridge and it was used throughout the remainder of Second World War for reconnaissance, defence and strike operations using Supermarine Spitfires, Douglas Bostons and de Havilland Mosquitoes. It was also the home of the Free French Squadron (Lorraine).

During the construction of the airfield, the already built runways were used for glider testing, including the massive General Aircraft Hamilcar.

A number of important people used the airfield including King George VI and Queen Elizabeth, Supreme Allied Commander U.S. General Dwight D Eisenhower and British Field Marshal Bernard Montgomery.

Due to its geographical proximity to RAE Farnborough Royal Aircraft Establishment the airfield was used to develop the Fog Investigation and Dispersal Operation (FIDO) system to enable aircraft operations in heavy fog.

The station was renamed to RAF Blackbushe on 18 November 1944 and it became an airfield for the Douglas Dakotas of RAF Transport Command during the 1948 airlift during the Berlin Blockade.

The RAF Station was closed on 15 November 1946 and in February 1947 the airfield became Blackbushe Airport under the control of the Ministry of Civil Aviation. During the 1950s the airfield saw increased used as a base for US Navy transport aircraft.

Blackbushe was also considered during WWII in consultations to decide the site of London's post-war principal civil airport. It was only narrowly beaten by Heathrow; the winner was announced in 1944.

== Units and aircraft (RAF Hartford Bridge) ==
- No. 16 Squadron RAF (1943-1944) Supermarine Spitfire V and IX.
- No. 21 Squadron RAF (1943) Lockheed Ventura I and II.
- No. 88 (Hong Kong) Squadron RAF (1943-1944) Douglas Boston IIIA and IV.
- No. 107 Squadron RAF (1943-1944) Douglas Boston III and IIIA.
- No. 107 Squadron RAF (1944) de Havilland Mosquito VI.
- No. 140 Squadron RAF (1943-1944) Lockheed Ventura I, Supermarine Spitfire PRVII, XI and IX, de Havilland Mosquito XVI.
- No. 171 Squadron RAF (1942-1943) North American Mustang IA, Curtiss Tomahawk I.
- No. 226 Squadron RAF (1944) North American Mitchell II.
- No. 264 (Madras Presidency) Squadron RAF (1944) de Havilland Mosquito XIII.
- No. 305 Polish Bomber Squadron (1944) de Havilland Mosquito VI.
- No. 322 (Dutch) Squadron RAF (1944) Supermarine Spitfire XIV.
- No. 342 (GB I/20 'Lorraine') Squadron RAF (1943-1944) Douglas Boston IIIA and IV.
- No. 430 Squadron RCAF (1943) Curtiss Tomahawk I and II.
- No. 613 (City of Manchester) Squadron AAF (1944) de Havilland Mosquito VI.

== Units and aircraft (RAF Blackbushe) ==
- Detachment of No. 128 Squadron RAF (October 1945 - March 1946) with the Mosquito XVI
- No. 162 Squadron RAF (1945-1946) de Havilland Mosquito XX and XXV]
- No. 167 (Gold Coast) Squadron RAF (1944-1945) Vickers Warwick I and III.
- No. 301 Polish Bomber Squadron (1945) Vickers Warwick I and III. Free Polish Air Force Squadron.
- No. 418 Squadron RCAF (1944) de Havilland Mosquito VI.
- No. 605 (County of Warwick) Squadron AAF (1944-1945) de Havilland Mosquito VI.
- No. 622 Squadron RAuxAF (1950-1953) Vickers Valetta C.1.
- No. 2770 Squadron RAF Regiment
- No. 2773 Squadron RAF Regiment
- No. 2780 Squadron RAF Regiment
- No. 2800 Squadron RAF Regiment
- No. 2811 Squadron RAF Regiment

Units

- 2nd Tactical Air Force Communication Flight RAF (September 1943 - March 1944) became 2nd Tactical Air Force Communication Squadron RAF (March - April 1944)
- No. 34 Wing Support Unit RAF (October 1944 - July 1945)
- No. 137 Airfield Headquarters RAF (November 1943 - May 1944) became No. 137 (Bomber) Wing RAF (May - October 1944)
- No. 138 (Bomber) Wing RAF (October - November 1944)
- No. 141 Airfield Headquarters RAF (May 1944) became No. 141 (Fighter) Wing RAF (May - July 1944)
- No. 141 (Fighter Bomber) Wing RAF (November 1944 - March 1945)
- No. 142 (Fighter) Wing RAF (June - July 1944)
- No. 160 Staging Post RAF (March - November 1946)
- No. 416 Repair & Salvage Unit RAF (December 1943 - October 1944)
- Detachment for No. 1422 (Night Fighter) Flight RAF (March - July 1943)
- No. 4156 Anti-Aircraft Flight RAF Regiment
- Detachment for Air Despatch Letter Service Squadron RAF (June 1945 - January 1946)
- 'B' Flight of Airborne Forces Experimental Establishment (March 1943)

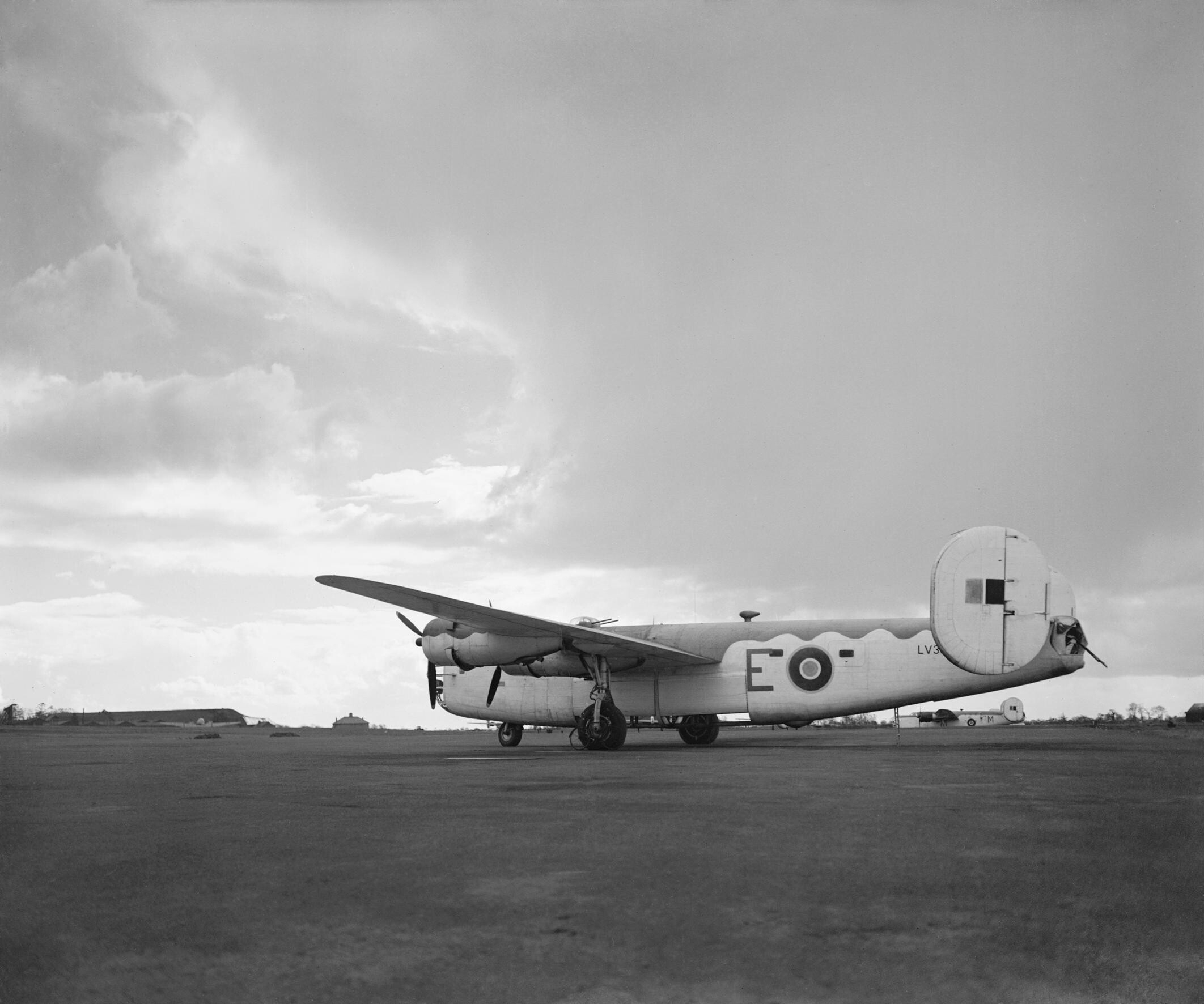
A Consolidated Liberator GR.VI of No. 200 Squadron RAF. This is the same version of Liberator as the one from 311 Squadron that took off from Blackbushe and crashed at Elvetham in 1945.

== Accidents and incidents ==
On 8 October 1945 a Consolidated Liberator GR.VI aircraft of No. 311 (Czechoslovak) Squadron RAF took off from Blackbushe on a flight to Ruzyně Airport, Prague. Five minutes later it crashed and burst into flames in a field at Elvetham, near Hartley Wintney, southwest of Blackbush. All 23 people aboard were Czechoslovak, and all were killed: five crew, 17 passengers and one stowaway. The passengers included nine women and five young children, the latter ranging from 18 months to three years old.
