= No. 525 Squadron RAF =

- Active: 1 September 1943 – 1 December 1946
- Country: United Kingdom
- Branch: Royal Air Force
- Part of: No. 44 Group, RAF Transport Command (1943–1944); No. 47 Group, RAF Transport Command (1945–1946)
- Mottos: Latin: Vinciendo Vincimus (Translation: "We link together to conquer")

Insignia
- Squadron Badge heraldry: A winged foot enfiled by a chaplet of roses and maple leaves
- Squadron Codes: 8P (Allocation confirmed, use unconfirmed); WF (Feb 1945 – Dec 1946)

Aircraft flown
- Transport: Vickers Warwick Twin-engined converted former medium bomber C-47 Skytrain Twin-engined military transport version of famous Douglas DC-3 Dakota airliner Short Stirling Four-engined converted former heavy bomber

No. 525 Squadron was a Royal Air Force transport aircraft squadron that operated during the Second World War.

== History ==
The squadron was formed on 1 September 1943 at RAF Weston Zoyland to operate the Vickers Warwick in the transport role. It first operated on the routes from England to Gibraltar and North Africa, but the Warwick was not the best aircraft for the role and it was withdrawn in 1944. The Warwick was replaced with the Douglas Dakota and one example of the Mark III transport version of the former four-engined heavy bomber, the Short Stirling. The squadron soon operated on routes throughout Europe and also became mainly manned by Canadian personnel. By the end of the war it was mainly operating routes to India. The Canadians withdrew at the end of the war, but the squadron continued with trooping flights. On 1 December 1946 the squadron was disbanded at RAF Abingdon, when it was re-numbered to 238 Squadron.

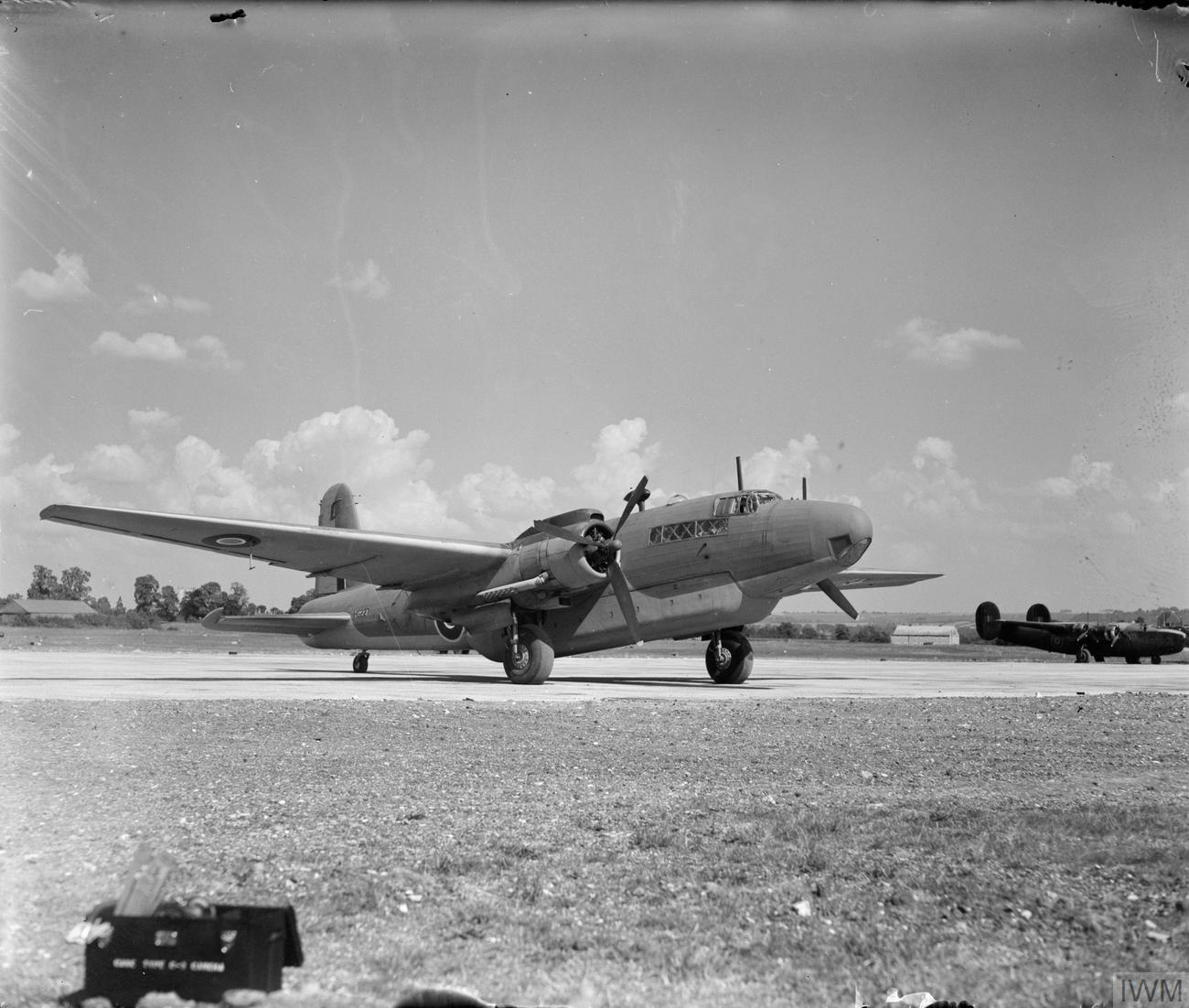
One of No. 525 Squadron's Vickers Warwick at Lyneham in Wiltshire

== Aircraft operated ==
Aircraft operated by No. 525 Squadron RAF
From	To	Aircraft	Version
September 1943	September 1944	Vickers Warwick	Mk.I
June 1944	July 1945	Douglas Dakota	Mk.III
July 1944	November 1944	Short Stirling	Mk.III
August 1944	September 1944	Vickers Warwick	Mk.III
February 1945	December 1946	Douglas Dakota	Mk.IV

== Squadron airfields ==
stations and airfields used by No. 525 Squadron RAF
From	To	Airfield	Remark
2 September 1943	6 February 1944	RAF Weston Zoyland, Somerset	
6 February 1944	15 July 1945	RAF Lyneham, Wiltshire	Det. at RAF Almaza, Egypt
15 July 1945	31 October 1945	RAF Membury, Berkshire	Det. at Vienna-Schwechat, Austria
31 October 1945	1 December 1946	RAF Abingdon, Berkshire	Det. at Vienna-Schwechat, Austria

== Commanding officers ==
Officers commanding No. 525 Squadron RAF
From	To	Name
October 1943	September 1944	W/Cdr. C.E.F. Riley
September 1944	June 1945	W/Cdr. D.R. Miller
June 1945	March 1946	W/Cdr. R.G. Dutton, DSO, DFC
March 1946	December 1946	W/Cdr. H.G. Newman

== See also ==
- List of Royal Air Force aircraft squadrons
