= List of ferry units of the Royal Air Force =

This is a List of Royal Air Force ferry units.

== Ferry ==
=== Flights ===
Unit	Formed at	Formed on	Disbanded at	Disbanded on	Notes
1 Ferry Training Flight	Lyneham	March 1942	Lyneham	3 November 1942	
2 Ferry Training Flight	Lyneham	March 1942	Filton	17 July 1942	
3 Ferry Training Flight	Lyneham	March 1942	Lyneham	20 May 1942	
10 (Polish) Ferry Flight	Kington; Langley	27 March 1941	Kington; Langley	27 July 1941	Absorbed by the Headquarters, Service Ferry Training Squadron.
1427 (Ferry Training) Flight	Thruxton	13 December 1941	Stradishall	1 April 1943	Absorbed by No. 1657 Heavy Conversion Unit RAF.
1428 (Ferry Training) Flight	Horsham St. Faith and Oulton	29 December 1941	Oulton	6 June 1942	The Ferry Training section being absorbed by No. 1444 (Ferry Training) Flight.
1442 (Ferry Training) Flight	Bicester	21 January 1942	Bicester	1 August 1942	
1443 (Ferry Training) Flight	Harwell	21 January 1942	Harwell	30 April 1943	Became No. 310 Ferry Training Unit.
1444 (Ferry Training) Flight	Horsham St. Faith	21 January 1942	Lyneham	3 November 1942	Merged with No. 1445 Flight and the Ferry Training Unit to become 'B' Flight of No. 301 Ferry Training Unit.
1445 Flight	Lyneham	27 February 1942	Lyneham	3 November 1942	Merged with No. 1444 (Ferry Training) Flight and the Ferry Training Unit to become 'C' Flight of No. 301 Ferry Training Unit.
1446 (Ferry Training) Flight	Bassingbourn	23 March 1942	Moreton-in-Marsh	1 May 1943	Became No. 311 Ferry Training Unit.
1689 (Ferry Pool Pilot Training) Flight					
Catalina Ferry Flight	Dar es Salaam, Tanganyika	June 1945	Mombasa, Kenya	July 1946	
East African Ferry Flight	Mombasa, Kenya	?	Mombasa, Kenya	31 May 1946	
Ferry Convoy Flight	Allahabad, India	21 June 1944	Mauripur, India	25 December 1944	
Ferry Flight, Cardington	Cardington	January 1939	Cardington	16 January 1939	Became No. 1 Ferry Pilot Pool and No. 2 Ferry Pilot Pool; eventually incorporated into Ferry Squadron RAF.
Ferry Flight, Santa Cruz	Santa Cruz, India	7 May 1944	Santa Cruz, India	29 June 1945	
Ferry Flight, Trichinopoly	Trichinopoly, India	27 April 1944	Trichinopoly, India	28 February 1946	
Ferry Training Flight, Bicester	Bicester	24 October 1941	Bicester	21 January 1942	Became No. 1442 (Ferry Training) Flight.
Ferry Training Flight, Docking	Docking	August 1943			
Ferry Training Flight, Dorval	Dorval, Canada	5 November 1941	Dorval, Canada	5 July 1944	Merged with No. 2 Ferry Crew Pool, the Civilian Aircrew Pool and the Allied Aircrew Pool to become No.6 Ferry Unit.
Ferry Training Flight, Harwell	Harwell	November 1941	Harwell	21 January 1942	Became No. 1443 (Ferry Training) Flight.
Ferry Training Flight, Horsham St. Faith	Horsham St. Faith	December 1941	Horsham St. Faith	21 January 1942	Became No. 1444 (Ferry Training) Flight.
Ferry Training Flight, Nassau	Nassau	?	Nassau	3 August 1943	Merged with part of the Service Aircrew Pool, Dorval to become No. 3 Ferry Crew Pool.
Ferry Transport Flight	Benson	30 December 1954	Benson	16 April 1956	

=== Units ===
Unit	Formed at	Formed on	Disbanded at	Disbanded on	Notes
1 Ferry Unit	Pershore	16 March 1944	Manston	17 May 1948	Became No. 1 (Overseas) Ferry Unit.
1 (Overseas) Ferry Unit	Pershore	17 May 1948	Abingdon	17 November 1952	Became No. 1 (Long-Range) Ferry Unit and No. 3 (Long-Range) Ferry Unit.
1 (Long-Range) Ferry Unit	Abingdon	17 November 1952	Benson	1 February 1953	Became No. 147 Squadron RAF.
2 Ferry Unit	LG.237	23 September 1944	Cairo West	1 December 1945	Absorbed by No. 5 Ferry Unit.
2 (Home) Ferry Unit	Aston Down	7 February 1952	Aston Down	1 February 1953	Became No. 187 Squadron RAF.
3 Ferry Unit	Oujda, Morocco	23 September 1944	Blida	14 January 1946	
3 (Long-Range) Ferry Unit	Abingdon	17 November 1952	Abingdon	1 February 1953	Became No. 167 Squadron RAF.
4 Ferry Unit	Catania, Sicily	23 September 1944	Capodichino, Italy	14 January 1946	
4 (Home) Ferry Unit	Hawarden	7 February 1952	Hawarden	1 February 1953	Became No. 173 Squadron RAF.
5 Ferry Unit	Heliopolis, Egypt	23 September 1944	Cairo West, Egypt	15 March 1946	
6 Ferry Unit	Dorval, Canada	5 July 1944	Dorval, Canada	30 November 1945	
7 Ferry Unit	Nassau, Bahamas	5 July 1944	Nassau, Bahamas	1 October 1945	
8 Ferry Unit	Mauripur, India	1 September 1944	Drigh Road, India	18 June 1945	
9 Ferry Unit	Bamhrauli, India	1 September 1944	Bamhrauli, India	20 June 1945	
10 Ferry Unit	Nagpur, India	1 September 1944	Trichinopoly, India	16 June 1945	
11 Ferry Unit	Talbenny	8 September 1944	Dunkeswell	15 August 1945	Merged No. 3 Aircraft Preparation Unit to become No. 16 Ferry Unit.
12 Ferry Unit	Melton; Mowbray	9 October 1944	Melton; Mowbray	7 November 1945	
14 Ferry Unit	Agartala, India	20 March 1945	Hathazari, India	13 July 1945	Absorbed by No. 209 Staging Post.
15 Ferry Unit	Filton	1 July 1945	Filton	10 October 1945	
16 Ferry Unit	Dunkeswell	15 August 1945	St Mawgan	15 November 1946	

=== Crew pools ===
Unit	Formed at	Formed on	Disbanded at	Disbanded on	Notes
1 Ferry Crew Pool	Lyneham	3 August 1943	Lyneham	16 March 1944	Merged with 301 Ferry Training Unit to become 1 Ferry Unit.
2 Ferry Crew Pool	Dorval, Canada	3 August 1943	Dorval	5 July 1944	Merged with the Civilian Aircrew Pool, Allied Aircrew Pool and Ferry Training Flight, Dorval to become 6 Ferry Unit.
3 Ferry Crew Pool	Nassau, Bahamas	3 August 1943	Nassau	5 July 1944	Became 7 Ferry Unit.

=== Pilots pools ===
Unit	Formed at	Formed on	Disbanded at	Disbanded on	Notes
1 Ferry Pilots Pool	Hucknall	16 January 1939	Hucknall	10 May 1940	
2 Ferry Pilots Pool	Filton	16 January 1939	Cardiff	April 1940	Disbanded to become 4 Ferry Pilots Pool.
4 Ferry Pilots Pool; No. 4 (Continental) Ferry Pilots Pool	Cardiff	April 1940	Kemble	7 November 1940	Disbanded to become Headquarters Service Ferry Pools.
7 (Service) Ferry Pilots Pool	Kemble	5 November 1940	Kemble	20 February 1941	Absorbed by Headquarters Service Ferry Pools.
8 (Service) Ferry Pilots Pool	Hullavington	5 November 1940	Kington Langley	27 March 1941	Absorbed by No. 10 (Polish) Ferry Flight.
9 (Service) Ferry Pilots Pool	Hawarden	1 November 1940	Hawarden	20 February 1941	Absorbed by Headquarters Service Ferry Pools.
11 (Service) Ferry Pilots Pool	Dumfries	4 April 1941	Dumfries	June 1941	Absorbed by Headquarters Service Ferry Squadron.

=== Pools ===
Unit	Formed at	Formed on	Disbanded at	Disbanded on	Notes
1 Ferry Pool	White; Waltham	3 December 1945	White; Waltham	31 March 1946	
2 Ferry Pool	Aston; Down	1 December 1945	Aston; Down	7 February 1952	Became 2 (Home) Ferry Unit.
3 Ferry Pool	Lichfield	30 November 1945	Henlow	10 September 1947	
4 Ferry Pool	Hawarden	30 November 1945	Hawarden	7 February 1952	Became 4 (Home) Ferry Unit.
5 Ferry Pool	Silloth	15 October 1945	Silloth	25 May 1950	
8 (Service) Ferry Pool	Kington; Langley	1 November 1940	Kington; Langley	27 March 1941	Became 10 (Polish) Ferry Flight.

=== Training units ===
Unit	Formed at	Formed on	Disbanded at	Disbanded on	Notes
301 Ferry Training Unit	Lyneham	3 November 1942	Lyneham	16 March 1944	Merged with No. 1 Ferry Crew Pool to become No. 1 Ferry Unit.
302 Ferry Training Unit	Loch Erne	30 September 1942	Alness	1 April 1946	
303 Ferry Training Unit	Stornoway	30 September 1942	Talbenny	8 September 1944	Became No. 11 Ferry Unit.
304 Ferry Training Unit	Port Ellen	31 December 1942	Melton; Mowbray	9 October 1944	Merged with No. 4 Aircraft Preparation Unit to become No. 12 Ferry Unit.
305 Ferry Training Unit	Errol	14 December 1942	Errol	30 April 1944	
306 Ferry Training Unit	Templeton	31 December 1942	Melton; Mowbray	15 January 1944	Absorbed by No. 304 Ferry Training Unit.
307 Ferry Training Unit	Bicester	24 December 1942	Melton; Mowbray	15 January 1944	Absorbed by No. 304 Ferry Training Unit.
308 Ferry Training Unit	Pembroke; Dock	22 March 1943	Oban	12 January 1944	Absorbed by No. 302 Ferry Training Unit.
309 Ferry Training Unit	Benson	21 April 1943	Benson	17 September 1945	
310 Ferry Training Unit	Harwell	30 April 1943	Harwell	17 December 1943	Absorbed by No. 311 Ferry Training Unit.
311 Ferry Training Unit	Moreton-in-Marsh	1 May 1943	Moreton-in-Marsh	1 May 1944	
312 Ferry Training Unit	Wellesbourne; Mountford	24 April 1943	Wellesbourne; Mountford	17 December 1943	
313 Ferry Training Unit	North Bay, Canada	1 March 1944	North Bay, Canada	18 October 1945	

=== Other units ===
- Ferry Crew Pool Unit RAF
- Ferry Training and Despatch Unit RAF
- Ferry Training Unit RAF
- Overseas Ferry Unit RAF
- Service Ferry Pilots Pool RAF

== Aircraft ==
Unit	Formed at	Formed on	Disbanded at	Disbanded on	Notes
Overseas Aircraft Despatch Flight RAF	Kemble	9 September 1940	Kemble	15 August 1941	Became Overseas Aircraft Despatch Unit
Overseas Aircraft Despatch Unit, Kemble and Portreath	Kemble	15 August 1941	Portreath	26 January 1942	Became 1 Overseas Aircraft Despatch Unit
No. 1 Overseas Aircraft Despatch Unit RAF	Portreath	26 February 1942	Portreath	10 October 1945	Disbanded
No. 2 Overseas Aircraft Despatch Unit RAF	St Mawgan	26 November 1942	St Mawgan	15 November 1946	Disbanded
No. 3 Overseas Aircraft Despatch Unit RAF	Hurn	15 January 1943	Talbenny	17 May 1945	Disbanded
No. 4 Overseas Aircraft Despatch Unit RAF	Redhill	22 May 1944	Bognor Regis	31 January 1945	Disbanded
No. 5 Overseas Aircraft Despatch Unit RAF	Aston Down	5 June 1944	Aston Down	31 January 1945	Disbanded
Overseas Aircraft Preparation Flight RAF	Kemble	5 November 1941	Kemble	1 January 1942	Became
Overseas Aircraft Preparation Unit RAF	Kemble	1 January 1942	Kemble; Filton	1 December 1942	Became 1 Overseas Aircraft Preparation Unit and 2 Overseas Aircraft Preparation Unit
No. 1 Overseas Aircraft Preparation Unit RAF	Kemble	1 December 1942	Unk	5 July 1944	Became 1 Aircraft Preparation Unit
No. 2 Overseas Aircraft Preparation Unit RAF	Filton	1 December 1942	Unk	5 July 1944	Became 2 Aircraft Preparation Unit
No. 3 Overseas Aircraft Preparation Unit RAF	Llandow	1 July 1943	Unk	5 July 1944	Became 3 Aircraft Preparation Unit
No. 4 Overseas Aircraft Preparation Unit RAF	Melton Mowbray	August 1943	Unk	5 July 1944	Became 4 Aircraft Preparation Unit
No. 1 Aircraft Preparation Unit RAF	Unk	5 July 1944	Kemble	10 October 1944	Absorbed by 1 Ferry Unit
No. 2 Aircraft Preparation Unit RAF	Unk	5 July 1944	Filton	1 July 1945	Became 15 Ferry Unit
No. 3 Aircraft Preparation Unit RAF	Unk	5 July 1944	Kirton-in-Lindsey	15 August 1945	Became 16 Ferry Unit
No. 4 Aircraft Preparation Unit RAF	Unk	5 July 1944	Melton Mowbray	9 October 1944	Became 12 Ferry Unit
No. 5 Aircraft Preparation Unit RAF	Dorval, Canada	5 July 1944	Dorval, Canada	1 October 1945	Disbanded
No. 6 Aircraft Preparation Unit RAF	Bermuda	5 July 1944	Bermuda	1 October 1945	Disbanded
No. 7 Aircraft Preparation Unit RAF	Nassau, Bahamas	5 July 1944	Nassau	1 October 1945	Disbanded
No. 11 (Landplane) Preparation and Modification Unit RAF	Thornaby	1 September 1945	Thornaby	25 May 1946	Disbanded
No. 12 (Flying Boat) Preparation and Modification Unit RAF	RAF Calshot	1 September 1945	Calshot	25 April 1946	Disbanded
No. 1 Aircraft Delivery Flight RAF	Hendon	3 March 1941	Andrews Field	9 October 1945	Disbanded
No. 2 Aircraft Delivery Flight RAF	Colerne	18 March 1941	Cranfield	31 July 1944	Disbanded
No. 3 Aircraft Delivery Flight RAF	Hawarden	10 March 1941	Catterick	22 November 1944	Disbanded
No. 4 Aircraft Delivery Flight RAF	Grangemouth	10 March 1941	Hutton Cranswick	31 October 1945	Disbanded
No. 1 Aircraft Delivery Unit RAF	Hendon	22 March 1941	Andrews Field	9 October 1945	Disbanded
No. 2 Aircraft Delivery Unit RAF	Colerne	22 March 1941	Cranfield	31 July 1944	Disbanded
No. 3 Aircraft Delivery Unit RAF	Hawarden	10 March 1941	Catterick	22 November 1944	Disbanded
No. 4 Aircraft Delivery Unit RAF	Grangemouth	10 March 1941	Hutton Cranswick	31 October 1945	Disbanded

== See also ==
Royal Air Force

- List of Royal Air Force aircraft squadrons
- List of Royal Air Force aircraft independent flights
- List of conversion units of the Royal Air Force
- List of Royal Air Force Glider units
- List of Royal Air Force Operational Training Units
- List of Royal Air Force schools
- List of Royal Air Force units & establishments
- List of RAF squadron codes
- List of RAF Regiment units
- List of Battle of Britain squadrons
- List of wings of the Royal Air Force
- Royal Air Force roundels

Army Air Corps

- List of Army Air Corps aircraft units

Fleet Air Arm

- List of Fleet Air Arm aircraft squadrons
- List of Fleet Air Arm groups
- List of aircraft units of the Royal Navy
- List of aircraft wings of the Royal Navy

Others

- List of Air Training Corps squadrons
- University Air Squadron
- Air Experience Flight
- Volunteer Gliding Squadron
- United Kingdom military aircraft serial numbers
- United Kingdom aircraft test serials
- British military aircraft designation systems
