= RAF Lyneham =

Royal Air Force station in Wiltshire, England

RAF Lyneham
- Lyneham, Wiltshire in England
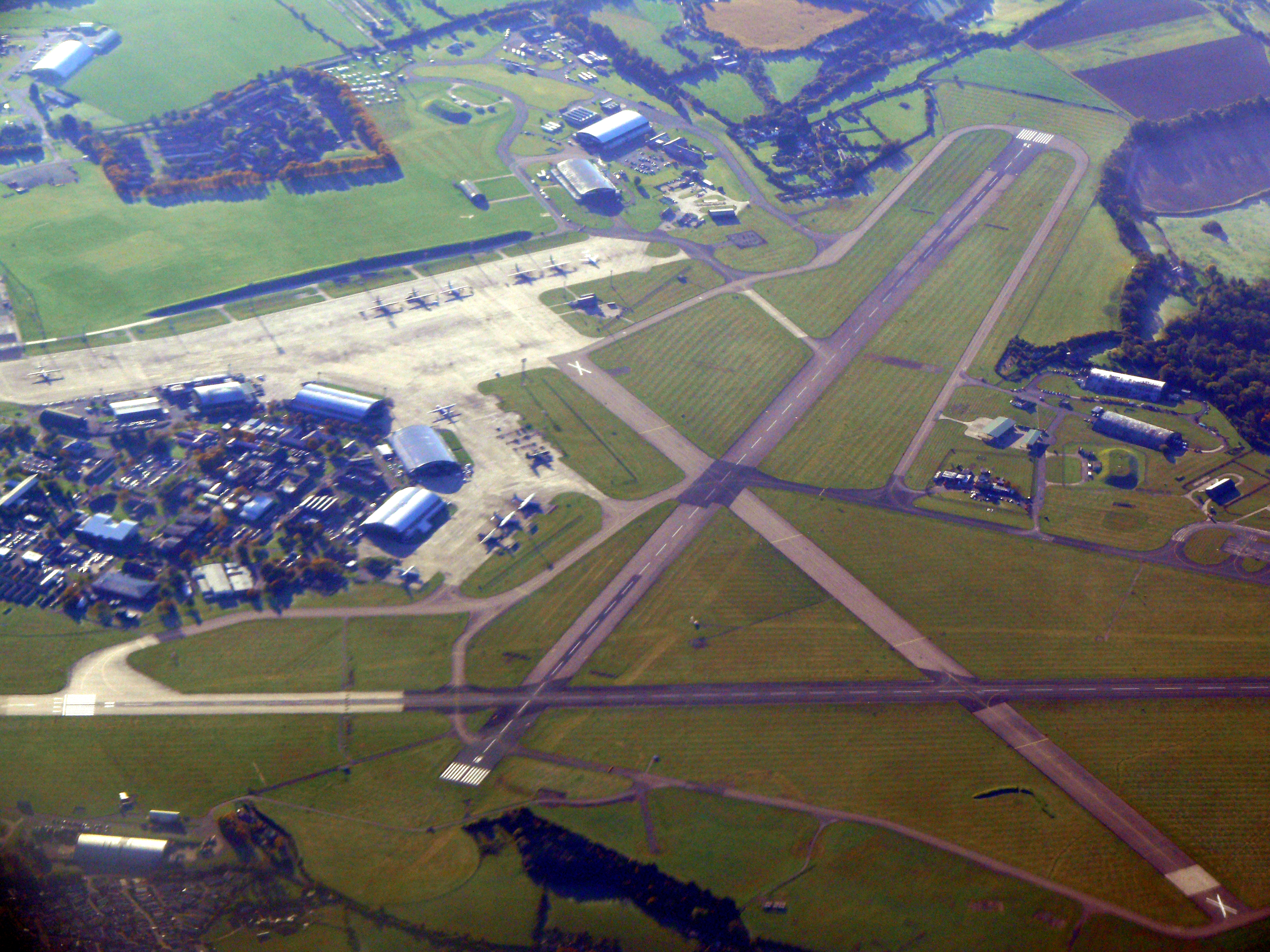
- Aerial view of RAF Lyneham in 2010

- "Support Save Supply"

Site information
- Type: Royal Air Force flying station
- Owner: Ministry of Defence
- Operator: Royal Air Force
- Condition: Closed

Location
- Shown within Wiltshire
- Coordinates: 51°30′19″N 001°59′36″W
- Area: 494 hectares

Site history
- Built: 1939
- In use: 1940–2012
- Fate: Transferred to British Army and became MoD Lyneham.

Airfield information
- Identifiers: IATA: LYE, ICAO: EGDL, WMO: 03740
- Elevation: 156 metres (512 ft) AMSL
Runways
| Direction | Length and surface |
|---|---|
| 06/24 | 2,386 metres (7,828 ft) Asphalt |
| 18/36 | 1,826 metres (5,991 ft) Asphalt |

Royal Air Force Lyneham otherwise known as RAF Lyneham (IATA: LYE, ICAO: EGDL) was a Royal Air Force station located 6 miles (10 km) northeast of Chippenham and 10 miles (16 km) southwest of Swindon in Wiltshire, England. The station was the home of all the Lockheed C-130 Hercules transport aircraft of the Royal Air Force (RAF) until they were relocated to RAF Brize Norton.

RAF Lyneham was the Royal Air Force's principal transport hub, operating the modern Lockheed Martin C-130J Hercules and the older Lockheed C-130K Hercules. The airfield was designated as a master diversion airfield: it was one of the primary airfields to which aircraft could divert in the eventuality of their home bases being closed due to weather, or other unforeseen events such as aircraft crashes.

The airfield became renowned for being the "gateway" between the United Kingdom and Afghanistan; the station was also where repatriation of British personnel killed in Iraq and Afghanistan took place. The bodies were transported through the nearby town of Royal Wootton Bassett, with crowds lining the streets to pay tribute.

The station closed on 31 December 2012 with the majority of its personnel and other assets having moved to RAF Brize Norton. On 31 May 2011, a parade was held, attended by the Princess Royal, to mark the departure of the squadrons. The final Hercules left Lyneham on 1 July 2011. Daily flying operations ceased on 30 September 2011.

The site is now known as Ministry of Defence Lyneham (or MoD Lyneham) and is home to the Defence School of Electronic and Mechanical Engineering (DSEME).

== History ==
=== Establishment ===
The airfield was built in 1939, necessitating the demolition of Lyneham Court manor house, the buildings of Cranley Farm and the village's tennis courts. The airfield itself was initially a grass landing area although the RAF always planned to lay hard runways. Hangars and other buildings were dispersed around the site to avoid creating one large target for an aerial enemy.

=== Second World War ===
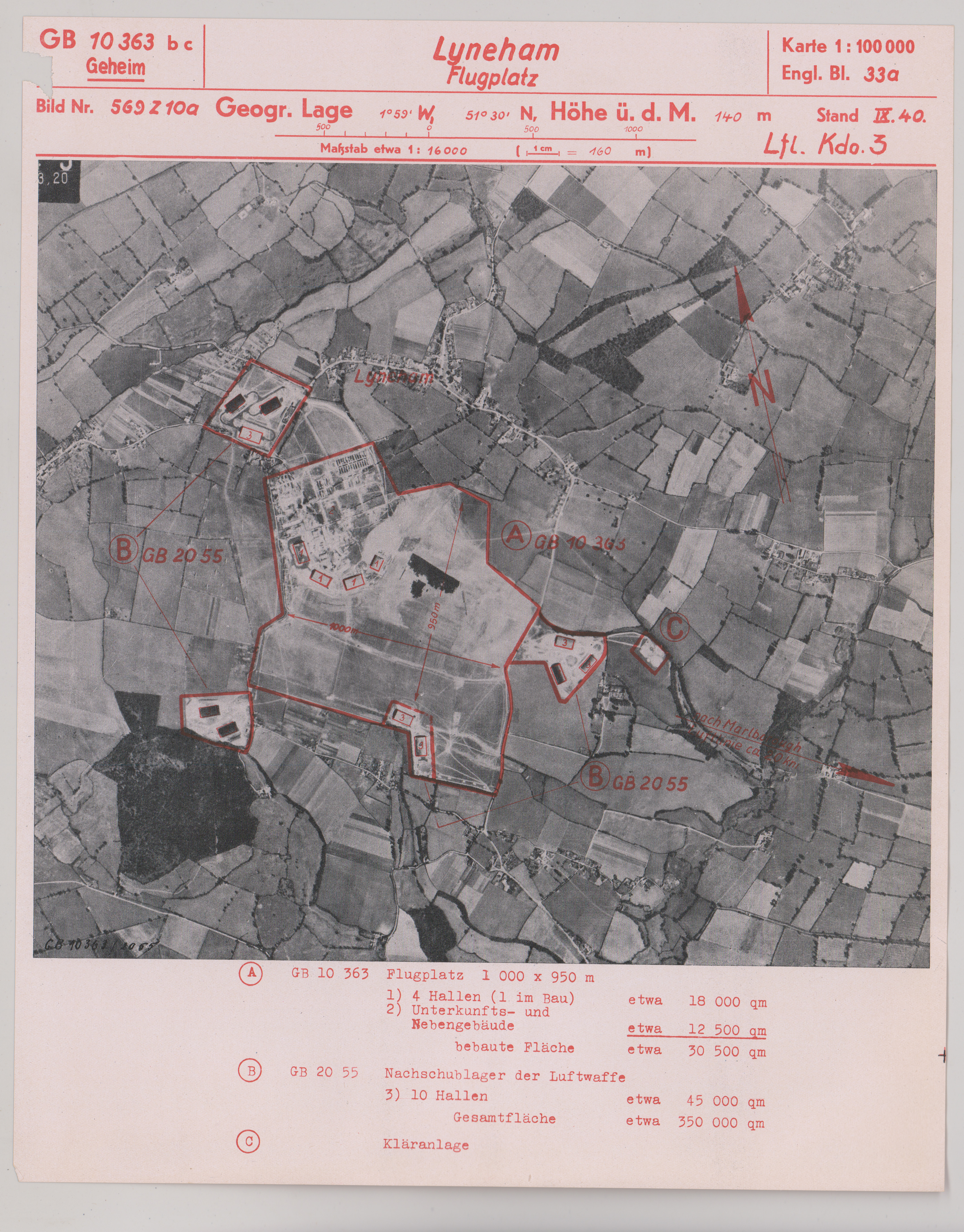
RAF Lyneham on a target dossier of the German Luftwaffe, 1940

The station was opened on 18 May 1940 as No. 33 Maintenance Unit (33MU), with no ceremony and few personnel. On the first day of operations, the personnel strength was recorded as four officers, one other rank and 15 civilians. Nine vehicles were also recorded, including two tractors, an ambulance and a Crossley fire engine. The station did not have any aircraft until the end of the month, when a de Havilland Tiger Moth and a Fairey Albacore arrived.

A single Luftwaffe aircraft attacked the station on 19 September 1940, dropping an incendiary and two high explosive bombs before strafing part of the airfield. Five civilian workmen were killed.

Lyneham's first runways were constructed during 1940 and 1941, the longest being 4,375 ft (1,334 m), the other 3,542 ft (1,080 m). During the following years these were both extended, and in 1943 the 6,000 ft (1,829 m) north–south runway was opened as well.

On 14 October 1942, No. 511 Squadron RAF (511 Sqn) was formed from No. 1425 (Communication) Flight RAF at RAF Lyneham. The squadron continued the work of the flight, operating regular transport schedules to RAF Gibraltar using the Consolidated Liberator; to extend the route from Gibraltar to Malta the squadron also operated the Armstrong Whitworth Albemarle. As the war progressed, 511 Sqn expanded its long-range transport role and was the first squadron to operate the Avro York (a transport aircraft based on the Avro Lancaster). At first the Liberators and Yorks were operated as separate flights, but the Liberator flight became No. 246 Squadron RAF (246 Sqn) in 1944. The squadron continued to fly trooping flights, particularly between the United Kingdom and India, until it was disbanded on 7 October 1946.

With the increase in air transport operations in the RAF, as opposed to ferrying, Transport Command was formed in March 1943. Lyneham, in No. 46 Group RAF, was its main airfield in the south. As well as sending its own aircraft overseas, Lyneham acted as the clearance airfield for planning, diplomatic clearance, customs and briefing purposes for transport aircraft from other stations flying abroad. It also provided facilities for aircraft being ferried overseas.

=== Post-war ===
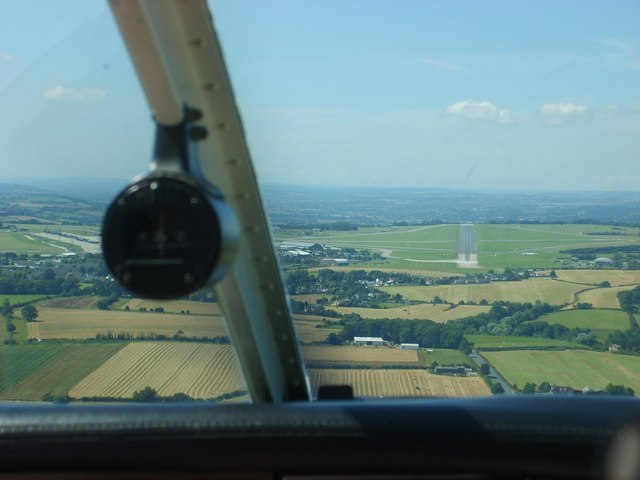
MoD Lyneham viewed on approach in 2007

No. 99 Squadron RAF (99 Sqn) re-formed on 17 November 1945 at RAF Lyneham equipped with Yorks, later operating as part of the Berlin Airlift. It continued in the transport role with the Handley Page Hastings then the Bristol Britannia from 1959 to 1976. 99 Sqn was disbanded in 1976, following the 1974 Defence White Paper. The squadron was re-formed in 2002, to operate the RAF's Boeing C-17 Globemaster IIIs from RAF Brize Norton.

On 16 October 1946, 511 Sqn was formed again as a York operator, continuing to fly the long-distance routes to India and the Far East until, like several transport squadrons, it became involved in the Berlin Airlift. The squadron then re-equipped with the Hastings and in 1957 moved to join other operators of the Hastings at RAF Colerne. A year later the squadron disbanded when it was re-numbered to No. 36 Squadron RAF (36 Sqn) on 1 September 1958.

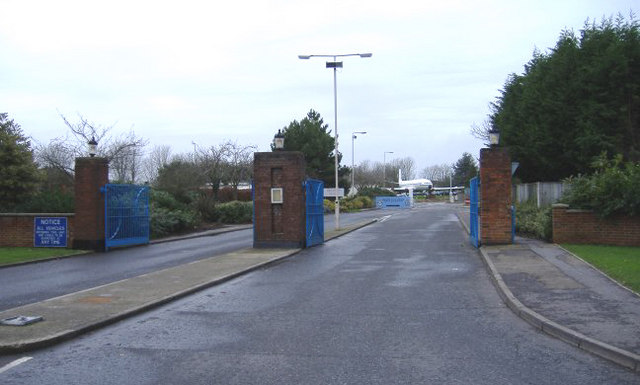
Station entrance with the de Havilland Comet gate guardian, 2006

In 1956, with the arrival of the de Havilland Comet operated by No. 216 Squadron RAF (216 Sqn), the main runway was extended from 6,000 ft (1,800 m) to its present length of 7,830 ft (2,390 m). This necessitated the demolition of two hangars on the north side of the airfield, and also the movement of the main gate from the north to the east of the station.

From 1958 Lyneham became one of the 18 stations designated as dispersal airfields for the RAF's nuclear deterrent V bomber force. A dispersal area called a "Dispersed Airfield" was built so that four Avro Vulcan or Handley Page Victor aircraft could operate from a self-contained base within Lyneham.

511 Sqn was re-formed again at Lyneham on 15 December 1959, as the second squadron to operate the Britannia on long-range trooping flights. It moved out of RAF Lyneham for RAF Brize Norton in June 1970, as Lyneham became the airfield for the newer Lockheed C-130K Hercules. The squadron was disbanded on 6 January 1976, when it was decided to withdraw the Britannia from service.

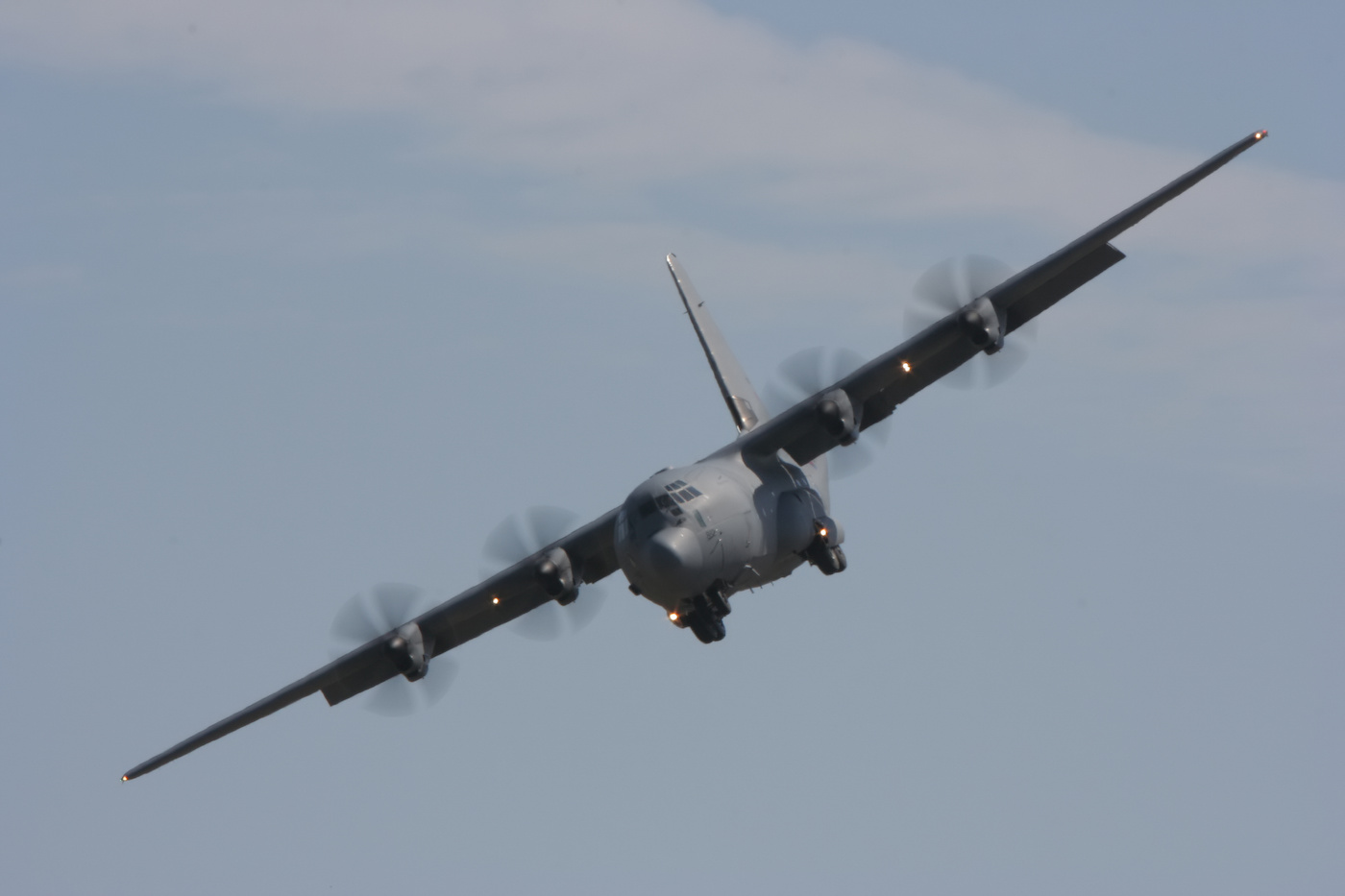
RAF Hercules in flight

No 36 Squadron RAF re-formed at Lyneham in June, 1967, with the new C-130K Hercules and was similarly followed later that year by No 24 Squadron RAF. Lyneham's position as the primary tactical transport base for the RAF was emphasised in February 1971 when No. 30 Squadron and No. 47 Squadron were transferred from RAF Fairford, followed in September by No. 48 Squadron from RAF Seletar in Singapore. This gave a total of five tactical Hercules squadrons at Lyneham, as well as the VIP transport Comet squadron, and in 1976 the station became the largest operational airfield in the RAF with the arrival from Cyprus of Hercules-equipped No. 70 Squadron RAF (LXX Sqn), bringing to seven the station's total of resident aircraft squadrons. The complement had reduced to five by 1978 with the disbandment of 36 and 48 Squadrons.

In August 1991, RAF Lyneham came under the media spotlight when John McCarthy was flown back from his five-year captivity in Lebanon to the Wiltshire base. Other famous names followed through RAF Lyneham as they were released, including Terry Waite and Jackie Mann.

In 1992, No. 242 Operational Conversion Unit RAF was renamed No. 57 (Reserve) Squadron RAF, and moved from the old airmen's hutted accommodation into a new building. There was a continuous programme of building from the mid-eighties to update and replace the original station buildings, which were not designed or built with such a long life in view in 1939 and the 1940s.

RAF Lyneham received the first of 25 new Lockheed Martin C-130J Hercules on 23 November 1999, to be operated by XXIV Sqn and 30 Sqn. The newer J-model aircraft worked side by side with 29 refurbished C-130K Hercules flown by 47 Sqn. LXX Sqn stood-down on 8 September 2010, but reformed in 2014 at Brize Norton, as the first Airbus A400M Atlas squadron, to be followed by 47 Sqn.

No. 38 Expeditionary Air Wing was formed at Lyneham on 1 April 2006, encompassing most of the non-formed unit personnel on station. The EAW did not include the flying units at the station or the other formed units i.e. Tactical Medical Wing. The station commander was dual-hatted as the Officer Commanding of the wing.

== Draw-down and closure ==
On 9 November 2001, the MOD announced a strategic review of the future roles of RAF Brize Norton, RAF Lyneham and RAF St Mawgan, in anticipation of the arrival into RAF service of the Airbus A330 Voyager (then known as the Future Strategic Tanker Aircraft) and the Airbus A400M, expected around 2010. The Minister of State for the Armed Forces, Adam Ingram, announced on 4 July 2003 that the RAF's air transport and air refuelling fleets would be consolidated at Brize Norton in order to make best use of airfield capacities and the defence estate. The decision would result in the C-130J fleet moving to Brize Norton from Lyneham, the intention being to retain Lyneham as an RAF station until 2012 when the older C-130K fleet would go out of service. If no further RAF or wider defence use could be identified for Lyneham, the site would close and be disposed of by the MOD.

In March 2006, it was revealed that Lyneham was being considered as a base for helicopters of Joint Helicopter Command (JHC) as part of Programme Belvedere, a basing review of the JHC helicopter fleets. However, the programme was abandoned in May 2009, when it was decided to retain the existing JHC basing arrangements, effectively confirming that Lyneham would close as an RAF station. At this stage, it was planned that both the C-130K and C-130J fleets would move to Brize Norton in summer of 2011, with the closure of Lyneham completed by the end of 2012. It was thought unlikely that a further military use would be identified for the site.

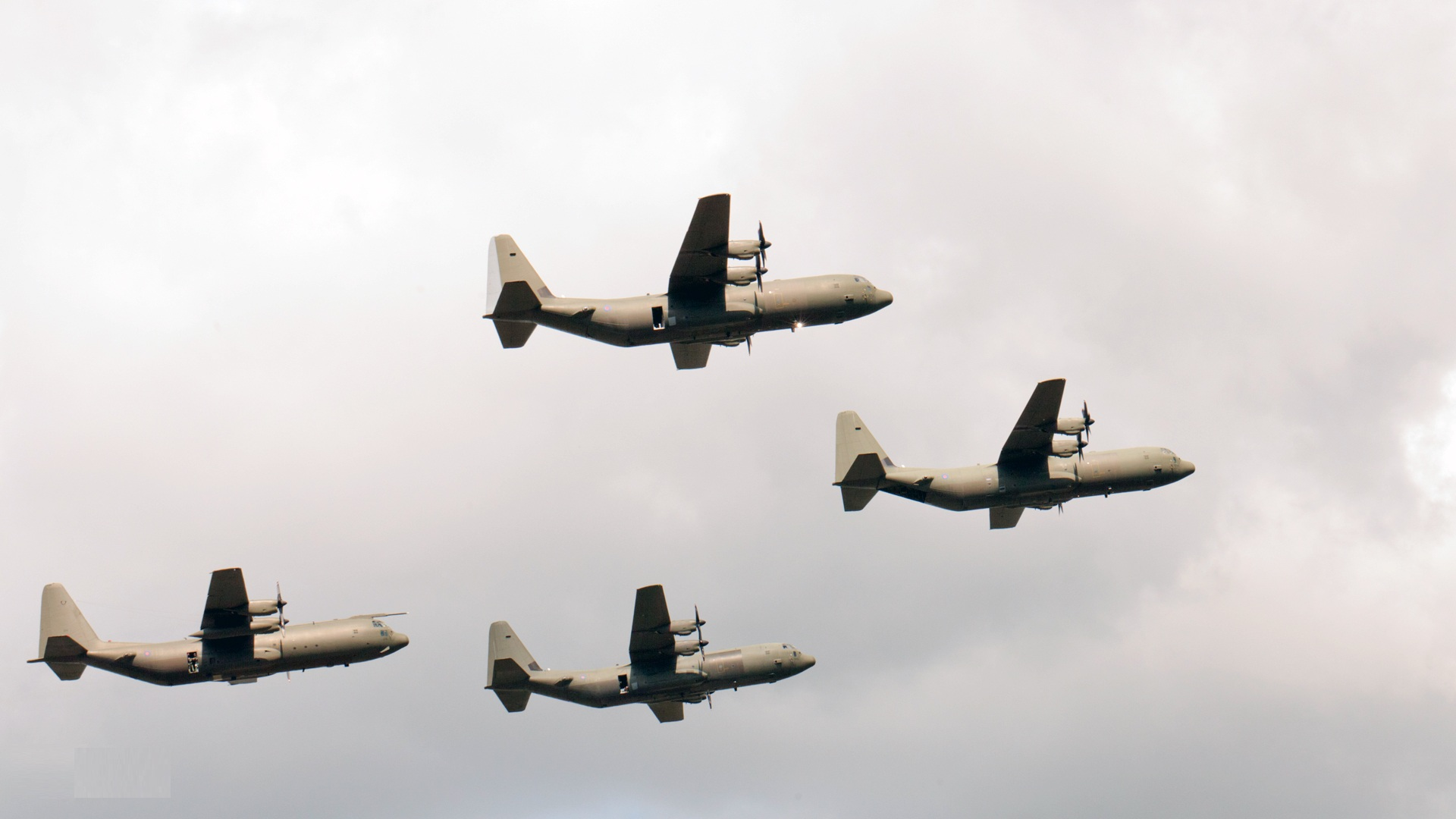
The final four C-130 Hercules aircraft en route to RAF Brize Norton on 1 July 2011

A parade attended by Princess Anne, the station's honorary air commodore, was held on 31 May 2011, to mark the departure of No. 24, No. 30 and No. 47 Squadrons. The Douglas Dakota of the Battle of Britain Memorial Flight conducted a flypast. By mid-June 2011, around 1,000 of Lyneham's 3,500 military and civilian personnel remained to complete the closure of the station. The final four Hercules departed Lyneham at 10:30 on 1 July 2011, conducting a flypast around Wiltshire before heading for their new Oxfordshire home, one of them piloted by the station commander, Group Captain John Gladstone. A ceremony attended by Prime Minister David Cameron was held at Brize Norton on 31 August to mark the formal transfer of repatriations from Lyneham. The station's air traffic control unit closed at 00:01 on 30 September 2011, at which point all flying operations ceased. As a result, the RAF Lyneham Flying Club moved to Cotswold Airport in Gloucestershire.

On 1 June 2012, an inscribed Portland stone memorial, a bench and an oak tree were unveiled on The Green within the village of Lyneham. The memorial commemorates the RAF's use of the nearby station for over 70 years.

The number of station personnel continued to drop throughout 2012 as support functions moved out. A flag-lowering ceremony took place on 17 December 2012, with Lyneham officially closing as an RAF station on 31 December 2012, after which it was handed over to the MOD's Defence Infrastructure Organisation.

== Post-RAF use ==
As part of the Defence Technical Training Change Programme, part of the wider Defence Training Review, the MOD announced on 18 July 2011 that the Defence College of Technical Training (DCTT) would be relocated to Lyneham, bringing together technical training undertaken by the British Army, the RAF and the Royal Navy. Construction work to redevelop Lyneham for its new role began in February 2014. The air force and navy withdrew from the programme and the Army's Royal Electrical and Mechanical Engineers technical training establishments at Arborfield and Bordon transferred to Lyneham in September 2015. The School of Army Aeronautical Engineering, which also moved from Aborfield, started training at Lyneham in October 2015.

== Units ==
The following squadron were here at some point:

- No. 53 Squadron RAF
- No. 159 Squadron RAF
- No. 160 Squadron RAF
- No. 206 Squadron RAF
- No. 242 Squadron RAF
- No. 525 Squadron RAF

The following units were also here at some point:

- No. 1 Air Mobility Wing RAF
- No. 1 Ferry Crew Pool RAF
- No. 1 Flight, Ferry Training Unit RAF
- No. 2 Flight, Ferry Training Unit RAF
- No. 3 Flight, Ferry Training Unit RAF
- No. 14 Service Flying Training School RAF
- No. 41 Group Test Pilots Pool RAF
- No. 91 (Forward) Staging Post
- No. 92 (Forward) Staging Post
- No. 93 (Forward) Staging Post
- No. 94 (Forward) Staging Post
- No. 150 Staging Post
- No. 301 Ferry Training Unit RAF
- No. 1359 (Transport) Flight RAF
- No. 1409 (Long Range Meteorological Reconnaissance) Flight RAF
- No. 1444 (Ferry Training) Flight RAF
- No. 1445 Flight RAF
- No. 6 Section of No. 1552 (Radio Aids Training) Flight RAF
- No. 1577 Flight RAF
- Air Despatch and Reception Unit RAF
- Casualty Air Evacuation Squadron RAF
- Ferry Training Unit RAF
- Hercules Operational Evaluation Unit RAF
- Lincoln Theseus Experimental Flight RAF
- Lyneham Transport Wing RAF
- Maintenance Command Jet Training Flight RAF

== See also ==
- List of former Royal Air Force stations
- Holden's Lightning flight
