= Joint Air Delivery Test and Evaluation Unit =

UK Joint military evaluation unit

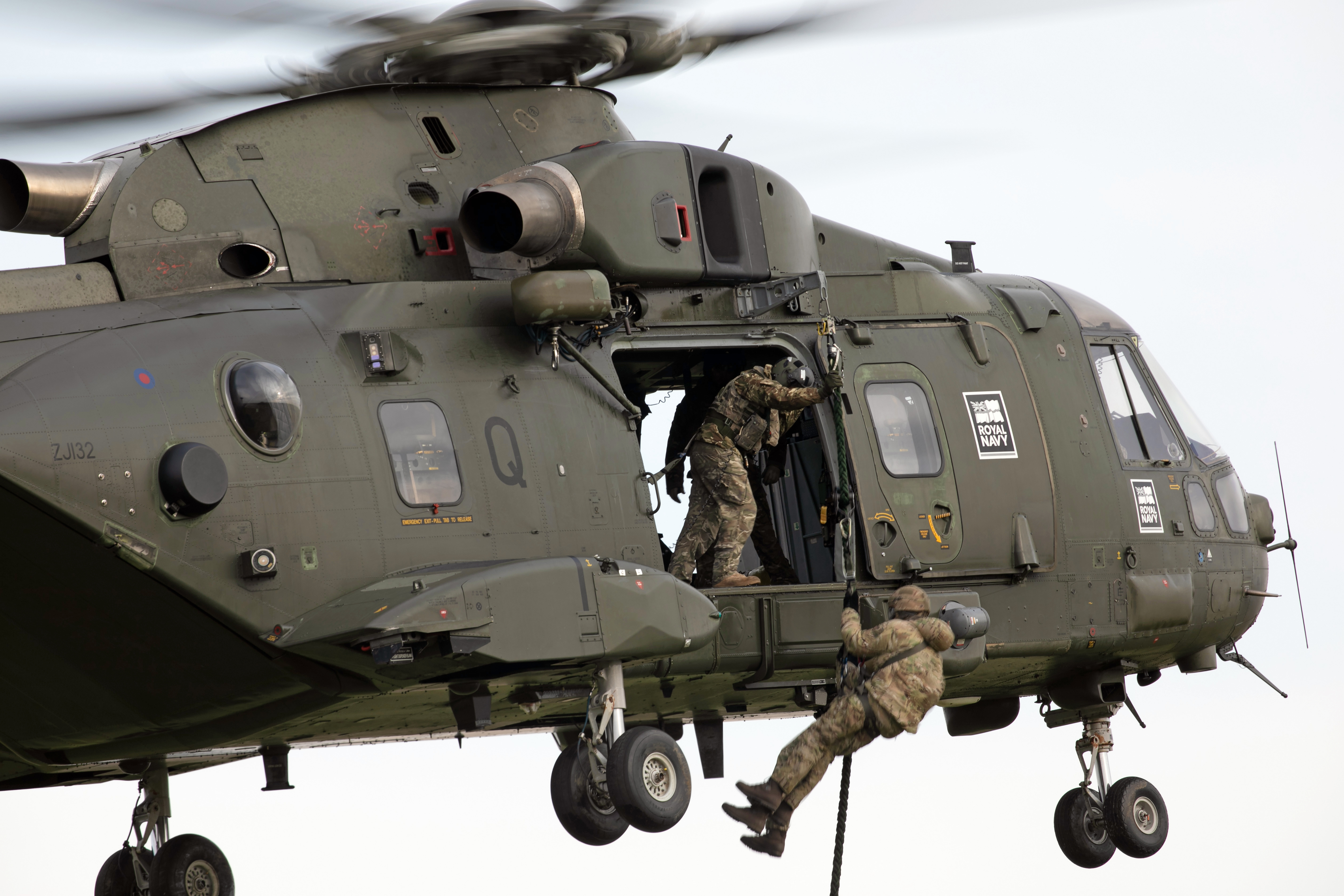
- A Royal Navy Merlin helicopter engaged in trials and training with JADTEU
- Active: 1968 – present
- Country: United Kingdom
- Branch: (United Kingdom) Royal Navy; British Army; Royal Air Force
- Role: Air testing and evaluation
- Garrison/HQ: RAF Brize Norton
- Motto: We Enable

The Joint Air Delivery Test and Evaluation Unit (JADTEU) is a tri-service Air Warfare Centre unit located at RAF Brize Norton, England. Commanded by a lieutenant colonel, it has a combined strength of approximately 115 military personnel and civil servants. Its primary role is to conduct operational trials and evaluation and to develop the delivery by air of personnel, machines and materiel on behalf of sponsors. In addition it provides advice/recommendations to MOD sponsors, other government departments, civilian industry and foreign governments on all air transport matters. It received ISO 9001 accreditation in 1997, this a requirement of holding Design Approved Organisation Scheme (DAOS) approval.

== History ==
The Joint Air Transport Establishment (JATE) has its origins in the formation of the Army's Airborne Forces Development Centre (AFDC) at Amesbury Abbey in May 1943 and the RAF's Airborne Forces Tactical Development Unit (AFTDU) at Tarrant Rushton in September 1943. These units evolved into the Army Air transport Training and Development Centre (AATDC) and the RAF's Air Transport Tactical Development Unit (ATTDU), before joining in 1968, under the tri-service banner of JATE.

Since its inception in 1968, JATE has undergone two stages of restructuring combined with moves in location. The first stage of restructuring was largely concerned with consolidation and unification, whilst the second stage was one of streamlining with further merger of resources. The transition from inception to the leaner and unified structure of today is briefly outlined in the paragraphs that follow.

=== JATE Pre History ===
AFDC's task was to develop and test equipment peculiar to parachute and glider techniques and to develop tactical glider loads for airborne operations. Loading techniques were investigated for the Horsa, Hamilcar and Hadrian gliders and were later extended to include Dakota aircraft. A large amount of work was also done on supplies packing and dropping of Army stores.

During the latter half of 1944 the growing need for air transport of the Army as a whole (as distinct from Airborne Forces) was appreciated, and in order to embrace and co-ordinate all Army air transport requirements, certain essential amendments were made and the centre re-designated the Army Airborne Transport Development Centre (AATDC).

The RAF's AFTDU was renamed Air Transport Tactical Development Unit (ATTDU) in January 1944 and moved to Netheravon; it was renamed again in August 1945 to Transport Command Development Unit (TCDU). It moved to Harwell in November 1945 and to RAF Brize Norton in January 1946.

In May 1946 the AATDC moved to RAF Brize Norton to facilitate co-operation with TCDU which provided the airlift for trial drops and exercises and which assisted in the clearance of Army loads for carriage in powered aircraft and gliders. During this period an American Airborne Detachment joined AATDC, not only for liaison purposes, but to take an active part in tests and training.

In June 1949 AATDC was renamed the Airy Air transport Training and Development Centre, (because of its training commitments), and kept the abbreviation AATDC. At the same time it moved with TCDU to RAF Abingdon. In March 1951, AATDC moved to RAF Old Sarum where it remained for over 20 years working closely with the Aeroplane and Armaments Experimental Establishment (A&AEE) at Boscome Down, Army headquarters and formations in the Salisbury Plain and the Joint Warfare Establishment also at Old Sarum.

TCDU disbanded at Abingdon on 28 February 1950 but in its place, a day later, an Air Transport Development Flight was created as part of Flying Wing RAF Abingdon. However in October 1951, this flight became a separate unit in Abingdon known as the Transport Command Development Flight (TCDF). It moved to Benson in January 1956 and was disbanded there a year later in February 1957. After a year it was decided to recreate a specialist unit and the Air Movements Development Unit (AMDU) was formed at Abingdon in March 1958 where it stayed for seven years until its disbandment on 31 May 1965 to be replaced a day later, also at Abingdon, by the Air Transport Development Unit (ATDU).

=== Inception (Old Sarum) ===
JATE (Joint Air Transport Establishment) was formed in January 1968 with its headquarters at Old Sarum, which at that time was also home of the Joint Warfare Establishment (JWE) and the Army Air transport Training and Development Centre (AATDC). The initial JATE Organization was based on a consortium of three separate units, operating under the co-coordinated control of Headquarters JATE. The three units in question comprised the Army's long serving AATDC, already located at Old Sarum, the RAF's Air Transport Development Unit (ATDU), located at RAF Abingdon, and a completely new body, formed at Old Sarum as part of the new organisation, and titled the Joint Helicopter Development Unit (JHDU). In its make up, the JHDU had absorbed the former Helicopter Section of the AATDC and, beyond that, as a tri-service unit the JHDU afforded Naval presence within the JATE organisation. At JATE Headquarters level there was a close link with JWE, with the post of Commandant JATE combined with that of Deputy Commandant JWE.

The JATE organisation continued on the above lines until 1970, when the Ministry of Defence decided that JATE should be based entirety at RAF Abingdon (already the home of the ATDU). As part of the change it was also decided that the main element of JHDU should become independent of JADTE, and remain at Old Sarum with the new title Joint Helicopter Tactical Development Unit (JHDTU). The one section of JHDU retained by JATE, made up in part of personnel of AATDC's old Helicopter Section, was the one concerned with helicopter underslung and internal load clearance work and techniques for carriage of troops by helicopter. Stemming from its JHDU background, JATE's Helicopter Section of today remains JATE's most 'Joint' section having RN, RM, Army and RAF representation.

=== Consolidation and Unification (RAF Abingdon) ===
In the second half of 1970 Headquarters JATE moved to RAF Abingdon. In the light of the move the post of Commandant JATE had ceased to be combined with that of Deputy Commandant JWE, and trials section of AATDC. The move to Abingdon was largely completed between April 1971 and February 1973.

In combination with the move a more unified structure was introduced within JATE, and by the end of 1971 the separate identities of AATDC and ATDU had been formally discarded although the various sections remained identifiable with their earlier affiliations. Under the new structure the line up of sections comprised; Heavy Drop, Air Dispatch, Air Portability, Infantry/Signals and Training Sections (all ex-AATDC), together with Air Logistics and Aircraft Engineering sections (ATDU background), Helicopter Section (JHDU/AATDC background) and Flying Section (Hercules aircraft) which was special to JATE.

=== Relocation and Streamlining (RAF Brize Norton) ===
JATE continued with its work at Abingdon until 1974. As a result of a Government Defence Review it was decided to move JATE to RAF Brize Norton (which, in passing had had association with an earlier predecessor of ATDU and with the old AATDC). The move from Abingdon started in November 1975 and was completed in February 1976, with 31 December 1975 as the date on which Headquarters JATE was formally established at Brize Norton.

The move also led to further restructuring within JATE, resulting in the merger of certain sections with a common role and thereby leading to a more streamlined organisation with savings in manpower. Thus the Heavy Drop and Air Despatch Sections merged to form the Aerial Delivery Section and the Airportability and Logistics Sections merged under the common title of Airportability Section; at the same time the Infantry/Signals Section became simply Infantry Section, whilst retaining a signals specialist. By the end of the 1970s the Aircraft Engineering Section had shortened its title to that of Engineering Section and in due course was to include an Army Project Officer within its make up. With the entry of the Chinook helicopter into RAF service, the responsibility for helicopter internal load clearance work was transferred from the Helicopter Section to Airportability Section (hitherto concerned only with fixed-wing aircraft loads).

Finally since the start of the 1980s the post of Commandant JATE, which used to rotate between the Royal Air Force and the Army, is now permanently provided by the Army. Similarly the post of Deputy Commandant, which used to rotate on a Lt Col/Wg Cdr basis, is now held permanently by a Wing Commander of the GD Flying Branch.

=== Change in Command and Control (RAF Brize Norton) ===
In the 1990s the MoD instigated a JATE study through VCDS. One of the recommendations was that the command of JATE should be moved from the Director of Commitments to the Air Warfare Centre (AWC) under HQ Air Command.

On 1 April 1998, as a result of that study, JATE came under full command and control of AWC, RAF Waddington. To bring JATE in line with other AWC sub-units (as an Evaluation Unit not an Establishment), Commandant AWC decided that JATE would be retitled as Joint Air Transport Evaluation Unit (JATEU) with effect from 1 June 1998.

The first significant change to JATE was the downgrading in rank of the Commandant and Deputy Commandant post from Colonel to Lt Colonel and Wing Commander to Squadron Leader respectively. The two posts were retitled Commanding Officer (CO) and Second in Command (2IC). The second significant change was as part of the reorganisation the JATE Flying Section left to become part of the Hercules Operational Evaluation Unit (HOUE) at RAF Lyneham.

=== Change of Name ===
In 2007 after the results of the TESD audit, the Airborne Trails Section at the Aircraft Test and Evaluation Centre (ATEC) merged with the Airborne Trials Section at JATEU. This was done to reflect the newer Air Delivery Test and Evaluation and extant Operational Test and Evaluation roles. As a result of the merger of the two sections, JATEU changed its name to JADTEU (Joint Air Delivery Test and Evaluation Unit).

== Mission Statement ==
JADTEU's mission is "To enable the delivery by air of personnel, machines and materiel through development, trials and training, in order to enhance Defence Capability.”

== Function in the MoD ==
=== JATE's Original Function ===
JATE is responsible for the study, development and service testing of techniques and equipment for airborne assault and air transported operations. The establishment is also tasked to train instructors and key personnel of the Royal Marines, the Army and the Royal Air Force in these techniques and those connected with the ground handling of helicopters. JATE is a joint establishment controlled by, and directly responsible to, the Central Staffs of the Ministry of Defence

=== JATEU/JADTEU's Current Function ===
JADTEU is responsible for the study, development, and service testing of techniques and equipment for air transport operations and airborne assault, and also has an important function as an advisory service with regards to design criteria for projected new equipment which may have the requirement of being air transportable (fixed wing or rotary), or of being air droppable. Other responsibilities include the day-to-day management and printing, or preparation to 'ready for printer' stage, of material for a wide range of Air Transport Operations Manuals; also drafting Army Equipment Support Publications (AESPs) for the aerial delivery range of equipment. Responsibilities also extend to the investigation of malfunctions (MALDROPS) and associated defects of parachute and air drop equipment, together with investigation of all reported aerial delivery equipment defects. In addition, when required by the MoD, JADTEU will assist with the investigation of accidents and malfunctions involving helicopter underslung loads. Finally, JADTEU is also tasked to train instructors and key personnel of the Services in the techniques and equipment involved with air transport operations, airborne assault and the use of helicopters.

== Organisation ==
Its chain of command is through the development division of the RAF Air Warfare Centre which comes under Chief of Staff Operations (COS(Ops)) HQ Air Command. The unit is parented for administration purposes by RAF Brize Norton.

JADTEU is manned by Personnel drawn from all three services, and a substantial number of Civilian Personnel. The Unit is broken down into a number of Lead and Support section, each of which contribute to the output of JADTEU.

Lead Sections

Air Portability:

The Airportability Section provides a trials environment and military advisory service to Service establishments, Industry and Defence Sales, on all aspects concerning the internal carriage of passengers, cargo (including dangerous air cargo), wheeled and tracked vehicles, weapons, helicopters, small aircraft and boats in fixed-wing and rotary transport aircraft.

Airportability clearances for single equipments are published as tie-down schemes in the Air Transport Operations Manual, Topic 11B, for the particular transporting aircraft. Composite Standard Load Schemes are also prepared for publication for aircraft carrying passengers with equipments as tactical loads, to assist the planning staffs in operational and exercise deployment.

The Section also conducts studies into air cargo handling techniques including palletisation of loads, the suitability of air cargo handling and aircraft role equipment, air movements documentation, together with the trials, development and suitability of cargo restraint equipments

Aerial Delivery (Historical):

The Aerial Delivery Section is responsible for the Service trials and development of systems (including parachutes) for the air dropping of equipment and supplies as required by the three Services. 5 Airborne Brigade must have tactical loads such as vehicles, guns, engineer plant and combat supplies delivered safely and reliably on to the DZ, and must have the capability to de-rig them and be in action within minutes. The Medium Stressed Platform (MSP) Reefed Mains Extraction parachute system enables us to drop 2x 18000lb loads as low as 550ft from Hercules C Mk1 or C Mk3 aircraft. The Heavy Stressed Platform (HSP) is used to drop engineer equipment up to 30000lb from a minimum drop height of 700ft, and a single platform can be carried in a Hercules C mk1. A wide range of smaller items can be air-dropped in simple containers; such loads may include ammunition, clothing, engineer stores, food and water, and even fresh eggs. Using the Hercules C Mk1 or C Mk3, a total of 20 tonnes can be dropped in one pass over a DZ.

The Section, in conjunction with Flying Section, is responsible for the Ultra Low Level Airdrop (ULLA) system whereby 21 tonnes can be dropped from 15ft above ground level. Additionally, a close liaison is maintained with the Personal Parachute Test Team when there is a requirement for parachutists to follow an airdrop of equipment such as the Gemini inflatable raiding craft, Rigid Inflatable Boats or when using the Wedge. Other responsibilities of the Section include malfunction and defect investigation, the day-to-day management of COSA A4 (i.e. Catalogue of Ordnance Stores and Ammunition -Airborne Equipment Section) and the drafting of Army ESPs. Courses are provided on the MSP together with training Aerial Delivery and Helicopter Load Slinging Equipment Inspectors

Aerial Delivery (Current):

Aerial Delivery (AD) Section is responsible for conducting operational test and evaluation on methods and systems for air dropping equipment and supplies. Through a DAOS approved Test & Evaluation Management Process, the section devises methods for delivering vehicles, boats and light stores under parachute as well as the modification of existing systems to improve effectiveness. Work in AD section also includes the investigation of air drop malfunctions and drafting AD publications such as rigging schemes, installation and despatch procedures for each specific load and aircraft type.

AD Sect is the only all Army section within JADTEU comprising RLC Air Despatchers and REME Artificers. The Heavy Drop sub-section, manned by REME artificers, is responsible for all equipments airdropped within the 18,000 lb envelope of the Medium Stressed Platform. The Light Drop sub-section is responsible for all other airdrop delivery systems. Airworthiness advice is provided by an embedded Aero-systems engineer from Engineering Sect.

AD Section can provide SME advice to all three armed services, allied foreign militaries, MOD sponsors, government agencies and affiliated civilian industry.

Helicopter Section:

The Helicopter Section's primary task is to produce formal clearances for helicopter external or underslung loads. These underslung load clearances, which are published in the manual "Carriage of Cargo by Helicopter", enable ground support personnel to rig military equipment and vehicles in preparation for helicopter lift. All loads undergo static lifting trials under the JADTEU gantry before flight trials are conducted to determine the load's flight characteristics and maximum safe flight performance.

In addition, the Section carries out one-off uncleared load tasks. Recent examples include the recovery of crashed aircraft and assistance to local government in the Gloucester and Cumbria floods.

The Section is also responsible for the trialling and development of new items of underslung load equipment and will provide assistance in the investigation of incidents involving the inadvertent release or irregular behaviour of loads.

Parachute Test Team:

The Parachute Test Team (PTT) at JADTEU operates as the primary military trials agency for airborne forces equipment for the MOD. More specifically this relates to all personnel parachutes and the ancillary equipment used in support of the airborne task. The PPTT frequently works in conjunction with QinetiQ, Boscombe Down, for the provision of Developmental testing as tasked by the relevant Platform Project Team. These tasks are conducted under the auspices of the Aircraft Test and Evaluation Centre (ATEC) in order to best utilise the appropriate skill sets available to the MOD. Falling out of the Developmental testing and, of course, inextricably linked to it, are the drills and procedures required for the introduction of tested equipment to the front line and this forms the cradle to grave philosophy and modus operandi of the PTT.

The PTT is commanded by a RAF Parachute Jumping Instructor (PJI) Squadron Leader, with an experienced PJI Flight Lieutenant as second in command, and primarily comprises experienced SNCO PJIs from the Physical Training Instructor (PTI) branch of the RAF, along with an RAF Safety Equipment Fitter (SE Fitt), a Special Forces liaison SNCO and a Parachute Regiment Medic. All members of the PPTT (except the medic and SE Fitt) are Test Parachutists and as such are highly experienced in all aspects/disciplines of military static line and freefall parachuting.

Historical Lead Sections

Flying Section (Became part of the Herc Operational Evaluation Unit in 1998):

This section carries out all JATE fixed-wing flight trials. It is manned by aircrew qualified to fly the C Mk1 and C Mk3(Stretched) Hercules. A Hercules is allocated to JATE from Lyneham on a continuous basis.In addition to providing the airlift capability for JATE, the Section is involved in projects such as evaluation and improvement of Dropping Zone acquisition aids, making recommendations for and producing amendments to Standard Operating Procedures for Transport Support (TS) Operations and Training, producing tables for Computer Air Release Points (CARP) and advising generally on the aircrew aspects of Hercules operations. The JATE Operations Room is part of the Flying Section.The Section maintains a continuous and close liaison with both Headquarters 38 Group and Tactical Transport Squadrons.

Support Sections

Engineering:

Engineering Section consists of Trial Engineering Officers, Workshops and the Design Drawing Office. The roles of Engineering Section are to provide engineering airworthiness advice for all lead sections as well as develop, manufacture and test equipment and hardware required in support of JADTEU trials. Additionally, the Section provides an engineering support service that covers all technical aspects of air transportation both within the Unit as well as to OEMs, other Service establishments and MOD branches.

The Trial Engineering Section works alongside Trial Officers from other sections to ensure compliance with engineering airworthiness standards throughout the trial process. Its responsibilities include assessing the suitability, strength and dimensions of equipment lifting and tie-down points for air transportability, as well as providing specialist engineering advice to industry.

The section is supported by an in-house workshop facility that manufactures prototype equipment for trials. Its capabilities include complex manufacturing and computer numerical control (CNC) machining. The workshops also support Project Teams (PTs) through small production runs and one-off manufacturing tasks, helping reduce project costs.

The DAOS accredited Engineering Drawing Office (EDO) is entirely civilian manned and provides a comprehensive and important support service for the majority of JADTEU work. The more detailed aspects of EDO work include assistance in engineering design and development of equipment to support JADTEU tasking in the fields of Air Portability (internal carriage and restraint of loads), Aerial Delivery and Helicopter Underslung Loads. This includes:

- Assessment and design of equipment for production

- Assistance in stress calculations, material selection and investigation, budgeting, costing and quotations

- Provision of Post Design services for equipment development at JADTEU and for which JADTEU remains the Design Authority

Training:

The Training Section is tasked to train Defence Helicopter Handling Instructors, Fast Roping Instructors and Heli Abseiling Instructors. In addition the section provides SME advice and trials work for all roping activities.

== Commandants/Commanding Officers ==
=== Commandant JATE ===
JAN 68 - FEB 68: Air Vice Marshal B P T Hasley CBE MVO AFC

FEB 68 - SEPT 68: Col T A K Savage MBE

SEPT 68 - JUL 70: Brigadier T ST G Caulfield MBE

JUL 70 - JUN 72: Air Commodore E W Merriman CBE DFM

JUN 72 - NOV 72: Brigadier G R Flood MC ADC

NOV 72 - DEC 74: Brigadier J G Bagnall OBE MC

DEC 74 - OCT 76: Air Commodore D A Trotman AFC

OCT 76 - JAN 79: Colonel S M W Hicky MRAeS

JAN 79 - FEB 80: Group Captain F Scott MBE

FEB 80 - DEC 80: Colonel A F R Evans MBE

DEC 80 - JAN 83: Colonel D C Whitten BSc (ENG)

JAN 83 - APR 85: Colonel M R W C Vernan-powell

APR 85 - JAN 90: Colonel G R Owens

JAN 90 - MAY 93: Colonel S A S Hill

MAY 93 - DEC 96: Colonel R M A Joy

DEC 96 - MAY 98: Colonel T R Bradwell

=== Commanding Officer JATEU ===
MAY 98 - AUG 99: Wing Commander C M Eames RAF

AUG 99 - AUG 01: Lieutenant Colonel T Mills REME

AUG 01 - AUG 03: Lieutenant Colonel A D Teare REME

AUG 03 - APR 06: Lieutenant Colonel M Oakes REME

APR 06 - APR 07: Lieutenant Colonel T A Gyorffy REME

=== Commanding Officer JADTEU ===
APR 07 - OCT 09: Lieutenant Colonel Teskey REME

OCT 09 - MAY 12: Lieutenant Colonel D H Crook REME

MAY 12 - SEPT 14: Lieutenant Colonel P S Marie REME BSc (Hons) MSc MA CEng MRAeS FiMechE

SEPT 14 - MAY 17: Lieutenant Colonel C Sweeting REME

MAY 17 - DEC 19: Lieutenant Colonel R Kolczak REME

DEC 19 - JUL 22: Lieutenant Colonel S J Allinson REME

JUL 22 - JAN 25: Lieutenant Colonel S Dutton REME

JAN 25 - Present: Lieutenant Colonel K Tait REME
