= No. 147 Squadron RAF =

Defunct flying squadron of the Royal Air Force

- Active: 17 October 1941 – 15 February 1943; 15 September 1944 – 15 September 1946; 1 February 1953 – 15 September 1958
- Country: United Kingdom
- Branch: Royal Air Force
- Mottos: Assidue portamus Latin: We carry with regularity

Insignia
- Squadron Badge: A shuttle in front of a staff
- Squadron Codes: RT (Apr 1939 – Sep 1939)

No. 147 Squadron RAF was a Royal Air Force Squadron that was a transport unit in World War II.

== History ==
=== Formation and World War II ===
Plans for formation of the squadron in World War I never came to fruition. It was formed on 17 October 1941 and deployed to Egypt as a bomber unit but was attached to other units due to a lack of aircraft and disbanded on 15 February 1943.

On 5 September 1944 it formed as a Transport Command unit equipped with Douglas Dakotas. Avro Ansons were added and operated until the squadron disbanded on 13 September 1946. It reformed on 1 February 1953 as an overseas ferry unit moving aircraft such a Sabres and Hunters before final disbandment upon merger with No. 167 Squadron RAF on 15 September 1958.

Became the Ferry Squadron.

== Aircraft operated ==
Aircraft operated by No. 147 Squadron RAF
From	To	Aircraft	Variant
Oct 1941	Sep 1942	Douglas Dakota	
Mar 1942	May 1942	Avro Anson	XII
Mar 1942	May 1942	Avro Anson	C.19
