= RAF Transport Command =

Former command of the Royal Air Force

Royal Air Force Transport Command
- RAF Transport Command badge
- Active: 25 March 1943–1 August 1967
- Country: United Kingdom
- Branch: Royal Air Force
- Type: Command
- Role: Controlling transport aircraft
- Headquarters: RAF Upavon; Previously Harrow
- Mottos: Latin: Ferio Ferendo ("I Strike by Carrying")
- Engagements: Second World War; Cold War

Insignia
- Badge heraldry: A golden griffon in front of a globe

RAF Transport Command was a Royal Air Force command that controlled all transport aircraft of the RAF. It was established on 25 March 1943 by the renaming of the RAF Ferry Command, and was subsequently renamed RAF Air Support Command in 1967.

== History ==
=== Second World War ===
During the Second World War, it at first ferried aircraft from factories to operational units and performed air transport. Later it took over the job of dropping paratroops from Army Cooperation Command as well. Transport Command was the only RAF command in to which aircrew originating in the Caribbean were not posted due to the fact that they might be required to fly to the United States where racial discrimination was legally entrenched at the time.

In June 1944 the Command was made up of No. 38 Group RAF; No. 44 Group RAF; No. 45 Group RAF; No. 46 Group RAF; No. 216 Group RAF; No. 229 Group RAF; No. 114 Wing RAF, and No. 116 Wing RAF at RAF Hendon.

No. 44 Group RAF - HQ at Gloucester

- "In the early days of the North Atlantic route, there was ..at the eastern end ..the Overseas Air Movements Control Unit (OAMCU) which in August 1941 was up-rated to become No. 44 Group, thus becoming the second piece of the Transport Command jigsaw. With its Headquarters at Barnwood (near RAF Innsworth) in Gloucester, [the group] organised the receipt of all aircraft arriving from across the Atlantic, as well as the despatch of those going out to the Mediterranean and the Far East; it also co-ordinated the massive influx of USAAF aircraft and crews under Operation Bolero."
- Controlled airfields such as Bramcote (where 105 Operational Training Unit was located), Filton, Hendon, Hurn, Kemble, Llandow, Lyneham, Melton Mowbray, Pershore, Portreath, Prestwick, St Mawgan and Talbenny

No. 44 (Ferry) Group RAF was formed on 15 August 1941 at Eastern Avenue, Barnwood, Gloucester within RAF Ferry Command. It moved to Transport Command on 25 March 1943 and controlled non-operational aircraft moving to and from the UK to the south or west. It was disbanded on 14 August 1946 and absorbed into No. 46 Group.

- April 1942 - HQ at Gloucester
  - RAF Prestwick = No. 1527 (Beam Approach Training) Flight RAF
  - RAF Kemble = No. 1 Overseas Aircraft Preparation Unit RAF & No. 2 Overseas Aircraft Preparation Unit RAF
  - RAF Filton = No. 3 Overseas Aircraft Preparation Unit RAF & No. 4 Overseas Aircraft Preparation Unit RAF
  - RAF Honeybourne = Ferry Training Unit RAF
  - RAF Hurn = No. 1425 (Communication) Flight RAF
  - RAF Lyneham = No. 1445 Flight RAF

No. 45 Group RAF - HQ at Dorval in Canada, (the former Atlantic Ferry Organization)

- No. 112 Wing at Dorval
- No. 113 Wing at Nassau
- became No. 45 Wing for a short time before disbanding

No. 46 Group RAF - HQ at Harrow Weald

- Controlled airfields such as Blakehill Farm
- Units included Nos 233, 512 575 Squadrons

No. 216 Group RAF HQ in Egypt

No. 229 Group RAF HQ at Delhi, India (formed 1943–44); controlled No. 177 Wing

No. 114 Wing RAF - HQ at Accra in the Gold Coast,

- Controlled airfields such as Heliopolis
- Units included No. 284 Wing

No. 116 Wing RAF at RAF Hendon, which supervised scheduled services to India.

On 17 February 1945 No. 87 Group RAF was formed in Paris to control units in Paris and southern France. It was disbanded by being reduced to No. 87 Wing RAF on 15 July 1946.

==== Accidents ====
Operating as it did under wartime conditions, Transport Command had a relatively high accident rate. Prominent accidents included a July 1943 crash at Gibraltar, killing the Polish leader General Sikorski and several other senior figures in the exile government; a February 1945 crash in the Mediterranean, killing eleven members of the British delegation to the Yalta Conference; and a March 1945 disappearance over the North Atlantic involving the aircraft formerly used as a private transport by Winston Churchill.

Following these and other losses, in April 1945, concerns were raised in Parliament about the experience of crews and the maintenance of aircraft within Transport Command. One frequent issue reported was that VIP passengers were said to put pressure on crews to fly in difficult conditions; the Air Ministry reported that it had tried to put in place orders to prevent this.

=== Post war ===
As the Second World War ended, on 7 May 1945, No. 4 Group RAF was transferred into the command, from Bomber Command, but disbanded in early 1948; No. 44 Group disbanded by being amalgamated into No. 46 Group on 14 August 1946; No. 48 Group RAF was established, but then disbanded on 15 May 1946; and No. 216 Group was transferred to RAF Mediterranean and Middle East. On 1 November 1949, No. 47 Group RAF disbanded by being renumbered 46 Group.

Overseas, two groups had been formed in India and Australia towards the end of the war. No. 232 Group RAF disbanded, now in Singapore on 15 August 1946, and 300 Group (24 April 1946 – 7 November 1946) in Sydney.

The Command took part in several big operations, including the Berlin Airlift in 1948, which reinforced the need for a large RAF transport fleet. The Handley Page Hastings, a four-engined transport, was introduced during the Berlin Airlift and continued as a mainstay transport aircraft of the RAF for the next 15 years. In 1956, new aircraft designs became available, including the de Havilland Comet (the first operational jet transport), and the Blackburn Beverley. In 1959, the Bristol Britannia was introduced, with No. 99 Squadron RAF. No. 511 Squadron RAF was re-formed again at RAF Lyneham on 15 December 1959, as the second squadron to operate the Britannia on long-range trooping flights.

During the 1960s the command was divided into three different forces:

- Strategic Force which operated the Comets, Britannias, VC-10s and Belfasts. Deliveries of the Vickers VC10 to No. 10 Squadron RAF began in December 1966 and ended in August 1968.
- Medium Range Force which operated Beverleys, Hastings and Argosys
- Short Range Force which operated helicopters such as the Bristol Belvedere, Westland Whirlwind and Westland Wessex and fixed wing aircraft such as Scottish Aviation Pioneers, Scottish Aviation Twin Pioneers and Hawker Siddeley Andovers.

During the 1950s and 1960s Transport Command evacuated military personnel from the Suez Canal Zone prior and after the Suez Crisis of October–November 1956; evacuated casualties from South Korea during the Korean War and from the Malaya during the Malayan Emergency; moved essential supplies to Woomera, South Australia, and ferried personnel and supplies out to Christmas Island for the UK's atomic bomb tests. In addition, Transport Command ran scheduled routes to military staging posts and bases in the Indian Ocean region, Southeast Asia and the Far East, to maintain contact between the UK and military bases of strategic importance. It also carried out special flights worldwide covering all the continents bar Antarctica. Many varied tasks were undertaken during the 1950s.

The 1960s saw a reduction of the RAF and a loss of independence of the former functional commands. Transport Command was renamed Air Support Command in 1967.

=== Other tasks in the 1950s ===
Operation Becher's Brook was a major operation of Transport Command – the ferrying of 400 Canadair Sabre fighters from North America to the UK, circa 1952. This required pilots and ground crew to be transported to Canada. The Sabres were flown via Keflavik (Iceland) on to Shetland and from there to mainland Scotland.

Transport Command also supported the British North Greenland expedition a research expedition from 1952–54 on the Greenland ice.

== Structure ==
=== Groups ===
No. 47 (Transport) Group RAF was formed on 1 January 1945 at The Hall, Milton Ernest, Bedfordshire within Transport Command. It reabsorbed No. 48 (Transport) Group on 1 April 1946, No. 47 moved to RAF Abingdon on 15 April 1948 and was redesignated No. 46 Group on 1 November 1949.

No. 48 (Transport) Group was formed on 29 October 1945 out of No. 47 Group at The Hall, Milton Ernest, Bedfordshire within Transport Command. It was disbanded into No. 47 Group on 15 May 1946.

=== Wings ===
During its existence the command supervised a number of wings:

- No. 87 Wing RAF
- No. 107 Wing RAF
- No. 108 Wing RAF
- No. 109 Wing RAF
- No. 110 Wing RAF
- No. 111 Wing RAF
- No. 115 Wing RAF
- No. 116 Wing RAF
- No. 117 Wing RAF
- No. 118 Wing RAF
- No. 177 Wing RAF
- No. 282 Wing RAF
- No. 283 Wing RAF
- No. 284 Wing RAF
- No. 341 Wing RAF
- No. 342 Wing RAF
- No. 900 Wing RAF

=== Units ===
Units included:

- The Airborne Forces Tactical Development Unit was formed at RAF Tarrant Rushton on 1 December 1943 and was disbanded on 14 January 1944 to become the Air Transport Tactical Development Unit. This new unit was then disbanded on 31 August 1945 at RAF Netheravon to become the Transport Command Development Unit. This unit was disbanded at RAF Abingdon on 28 February 1950 to become the Air Transport Development Flight, this new unit was disbanded on 14 October 1951 still at Abingdon to become the Transport Command Development Flight. This unit was disbanded on 8 February 1957 at RAF Benson.
- The Transport Command Aircrew Examining Unit was previously the Aircrew Testing and Grading Unit and was formed on 1 November 1945 at RAF Melbourne. It used a variety of transport aircraft until it was disbanded on 7 August 1946 at RAF Bramcote to become the Transport Command Examining Unit. This unit continued the work of the previous unit until it was disbanded on 23 June 1964 at RAF Benson, the unit then became the Transport Command Examining Staff until 1 August 1967 while still at RAF Benson became the Air Support Examining Unit
- Transport Command Air Support Flight was formed on 1 February 1953 at RAF Abingdon but was shortly disbanded on 14 September 1954 to become No. 1312 (Transport Support) Flight
- Transport Command Communication Flight was initially 'C' Flight of the Metropolitan Communication Squadron RAF and was separated doing May 1946 when it moved to RAF Upavon. At some point it became the Transport Command Communication Squadron and was disbanded on 1 April 1964 and was absorbed by the Western Communication Squadron RAF at RAF Upavon

== Aircraft operated ==
- Airspeed Oxford
- Armstrong Whitworth Argosy
- Armstrong Whitworth Albemarle
- Avro Anson
- Avro Lancastrian
- Avro York
- Beagle Basset
- Beechcraft Expeditor
- Blackburn Beverley
- Bristol Belvedere
- Bristol Blenheim
- Bristol Bombay
- Bristol Britannia (99 Sqn and 511 Sqn)
- Bristol Sycamore
- Consolidated Catalina
- Consolidated Coronado
- Consolidated Liberator
- de Havilland Canada DHC-1 Chipmunk
- de Havilland Comet (with 216 Sqn 1956–1967; Comet C2 and C4))
- de Havilland Dominie
- de Havilland Devon
- de Havilland Flamingo
- de Havilland Heron
- de Havilland Mosquito
- de Havilland Tiger Moth
- Douglas Boston
- Douglas DC-2
- Douglas Dakota
- Douglas Skymaster (1945–1946)
- Fairchild Argus
- Grumman Goose
- Handley Page Harrow
- Handley Page Halifax
- Handley Page Hastings
- Hawker Siddeley Andover
- Hawker Hunter
- Hawker Siddeley Kestrel
- Lockheed 12
- Lockheed C-130 Hercules
- Lockheed Electra
- Lockheed Hudson
- Lockheed Lodestar
- Martin Marauder
- Miles Mentor
- North American Mustang
- Percival Pembroke
- Percival Prentice
- Percival Proctor
- Scottish Aviation Pioneer
- Scottish Aviation Twin Pioneer
- Short Belfast
- Short Scion Senior
- Short Stirling
- Spartan Executive
- Stinson Reliant
- Stinson Sentinel
- Supermarine Spitfire
- Vickers Valetta
- Vickers VC10
- Vickers Varsity
- Vickers Viking
- Vickers Warwick
- Vickers Wellington
- Westland Dragonfly
- Westland Whirlwind
- Westland Wessex

== Commanders-in-Chief ==
Commanders-in-Chief included:

- 25 March 1943 – Air Chief Marshal Sir Frederick Bowhill
- 15 February 1945 – Air Marshal Sir Ralph Cochrane
- 24 September 1947 – Air Marshal Sir Brian Baker
- 31 March 1950 – Air Marshal Sir Aubrey Ellwood
- 1 January 1952 – Air Vice Marshal Robert Blucke
- 3 June 1952 – Air Vice Marshal Sir Charles Guest
- 15 March 1954 – Air Vice Marshal Sir George Beamish
- 15 October 1955 – Air Marshal Sir Andrew McKee
- 16 May 1959 – Air Marshal Sir Denis Barnett
- 30 April 1962 – Air Marshal Sir Edmund Hudleston
- 1 December 1963 – Air Marshal Sir Kenneth Cross
- 27 January 1967 – Air Marshal Sir Thomas Prickett

== See also ==
- List of aircraft of the Royal Air Force
- Royal Air Force station
- List of Royal Air Force commands
