= No. 167 Squadron RAF =

Defunct flying squadron of the Royal Air Force

No. 167 (Gold Coast) Squadron RAF
- Active: 1918-19; 1942-43; 1944-46; 1953-58
- Country: United Kingdom
- Branch: Royal Air Force
- Nickname: Gold Coast

No. 167 Squadron RAF is a former Royal Air Force squadron.

== History ==
=== Inter-war years ===
167 Squadron was formed on 18 November 1918 just after the Armistice of the First World War at RAF Bircham Newton as a heavy bomber squadron in No. 27 Group RAF with Handley Page V/1500 four-engined planes. The squadron was disbanded on 31 May 1919 still at Bircham Newton.

=== Second World War ===
The squadron was reformed on 6 April 1942 at RAF Scorton flying Supermarine Spitfire VA & VB's alongside a small number of de Havilland Tiger Moths. 167 initially moved to Castletown then Ludham where the VB mark of Spitfire was introduced to the squadron. On 1 March 1943 it moved to Kidlington then throughout early 1943 it moved to five more RAF stations for shipping reconnaissance and intruder missions over the Low Countries before being disbanded at RAF Woodvale on 12 June 1943 to become No. 322 (Dutch) Squadron RAF.

No. 167 Squadron was reformed at RAF Holmsley South on 1 October 1944 flying Vickers Warwick I & III's until it moved to RAF Blackbushe on 30 March 1945 where the Avro Anson XII was introduced. In July the Warwick's were taken out of service for technical problems to be solved, crews in the meantime flying Douglas Dakotas from No. 147 Squadron until the Warwick's resumed operating in September.

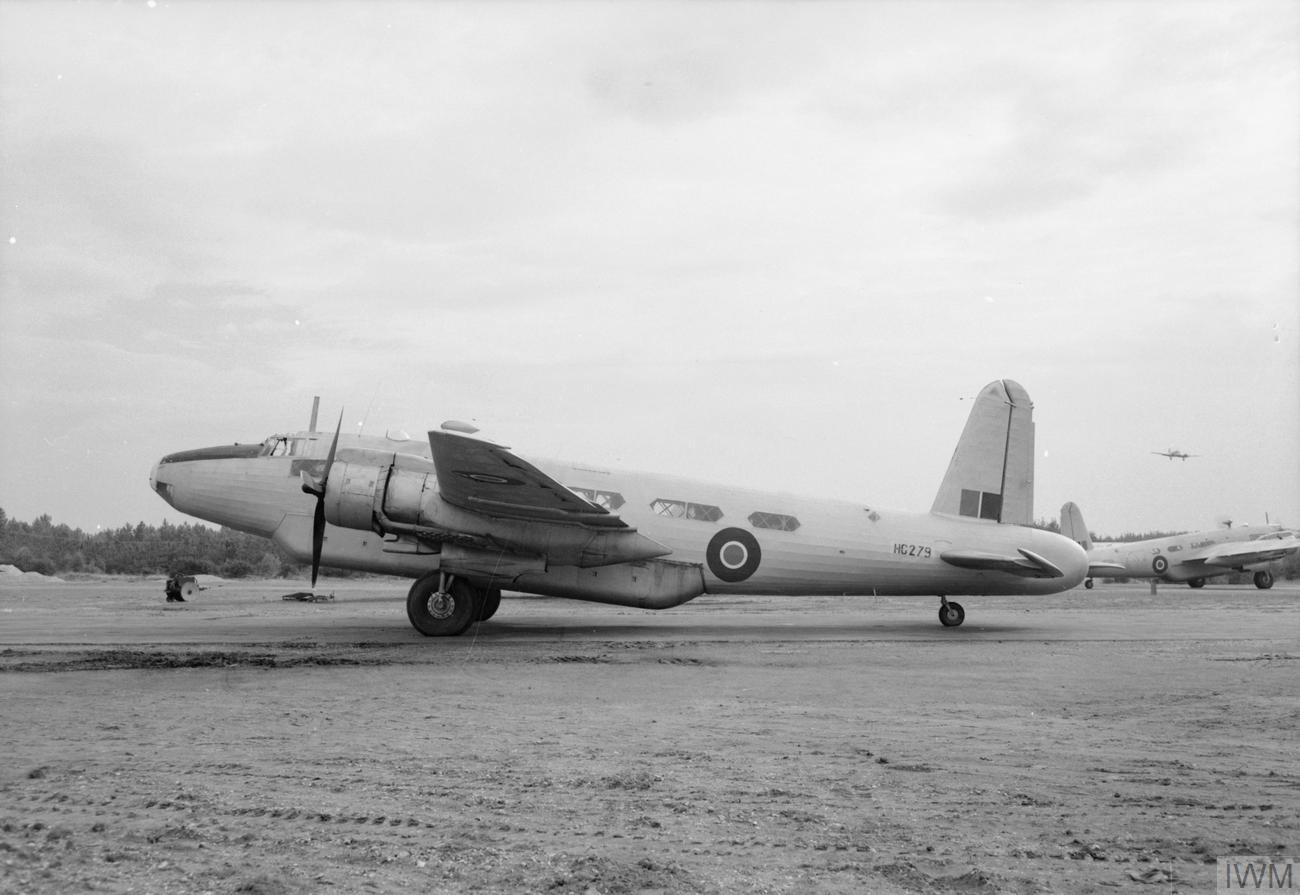
One of No. 167 Squadron's Vickers Warwick aircraft at RAF Blackbushe in Hampshire

On 1 February 1946 the squadron disbanded at RAF Blackbushe.

=== Post war ===
On 1 February 1953, No. 3 (Long-Range) Ferry Unit RAF at RAF Abingdon was redesignated 167 Squadron. It was engaged in ferrying aircraft until it merged with 147 Squadron to form the Ferry Squadron on 15 September 1958.
