= Ferry Squadron RAF =

Royal Air Force squadron, 1956–1958

Ferry Squadron
- Active: 16 April 1956 – 1 December 1958
- Country: United Kingdom
- Branch: Royal Air Force
- Role: Ferrying aircraft

Ferry Squadron is a former Royal Air Force squadron which operated between 1956 and 1958 at RAF Benson, the squadron was formed by the replacements, disbandments and mergers dating back to 1943.

== History ==
Firstly the Ferry Crew Pool Unit was formed at Filton Airport on 7 March 1943, it was then disbanded and became No. 1 Ferry Crew Pool at RAF Lyneham. On 16 March 1944 the pool was merged with No. 301 Ferry Training Unit to become No. 1 Ferry Unit at RAF Pershore, it was then disbanded at RAF Manston on 17 May 1948 to become No. 1 (Overseas) Ferry Unit. Back at RAF Pershore the unit was renamed No. 1 (Overseas) Ferry Unit during September 1950. The unit was disbanded on 17 November 1952 at RAF Abingdon to become No. 1 (Long Range) Ferry Unit and No. 3 (Long Range) Ferry Unit.

No. 1 (Long Range) Ferry Unit was formed at Abingdon and disbanded at RAF Benson on 1 February 1953 to become No. 147 Squadron RAF. Similarly No. 3 (Long Range) Ferry Unit was also formed at Abingdon and was disbanded on 1 February 1953 still at Abingdon to become No. 167 Squadron RAF.

On 16 April 1956 the Ferry Support Squadron was formed at Benson replacing the Ferry Transport Flight. The Support Squadron's name was changed to the Ferry Squadron on 1 January 1958. The squadron absorbed Nos 147 and 167 Squadrons on 15 September 1958 and was disbanded at Benson on 1 December 1958.

== Aircraft types ferried ==
Ferry Crew Pool Unit
- Vickers Wellington II's

No. 1 Ferry Crew Pool

- Vickers Wellington II's
- de Havilland Mosquito III's
- Vickers Warwick I's

No. 1 Ferry Unit

- Bristol Beaufort I
- Lockheed Hudson I
- de Havilland Dominie I
- Lockheed Ventura II
- Miles Master II & III
- Douglas Boston IIIa & IV
- North American Mitchell III
- Vickers Warwick I & V
- Airspeed Oxford I & II
- Bristol Beaufighter I, VI, X and XI
- Percival Proctor III & IV
- Douglas Dakota III & IV
- Handley Page Halifax II, III, V, VI, VII & IX
- Vickers Wellington X, XIII & XIV
- de Havilland Mosquito III, VI, XIII, XVI, XIX, FB.26, NF.30 and PR.34
- Avro Lancaster III
- Miles Martinet I
- Hawker Tempest VI
- North American Harvard IIB
- Supermarine Spitfire VB, IX & F.22
- Avro Anson I, X, XI, XII & XIX
- de Havilland Hornet F.1
- Bristol Buckmaster I
- Bristol Brigand B.1
- Gloster Meteor T.7

1 (Overseas) Ferry Unit

- North American Harvard IIB
- Douglas Dakota IV
- Vickers Wellington X
- Hawker Tempest V
- de Havilland Mosquito III, VI, XVI and PR.34
- Avro Anson T.20
- Bristol Buckmaster I
- de Havilland Vampire F.3 & FB.5
- Gloster Meteor T.7 & F.8
- Vickers Valetta C.1
- de Havilland Hornet F.3

No. 1 (Long-Range) Ferry Unit

No ferry aircraft known

No. 3 (Long-Range) Ferry Unit

- Canadair Sabre F.4

No. 147 Squadron

- Canadair Sabre
- de Havilland Vampire FB.9
- de Havilland Venom FB.1
- Supermarine Swift
- Hawker Hunter

No. 167 Squadron

No ferry aircraft known

Ferry Support Squadron/Ferry Squadron

- Gloster Meteor F.8 & NF.11
- de Havilland Vampire FB.9 & T.11
- Vickers Varsity T.1
- Boulton Paul Balliol T.2
- de Havilland Venom FB.4
- Percival Provost T.1
- Auster AOP.9
- Gloster Javelin FAW.4 & FAW.9
- Supermarine Swift FR.5 & F.7
- Hawker Hunter T.7
- Scottish Aviation Pioneer CC.1
- English Electric Canberra B(I).8
