= Ferry Training Unit RAF =

Ferry Training Unit
- Active: 5 August 1952 – 1 December 1958
- Country: United Kingdom
- Branch: Royal Air Force
- Role: Training ferry personnel

Ferry Training Unit is a former Royal Air Force unit which operated between 1952 and 1958 to train ferry flight pilots. The unit was formed by a series of replacements, disbandments and mergers dating back to 1939.

== History ==
- Ferry Flight, Cardington
- No. 2 Ferry Pilots Pool
- No. 4 Ferry Pilots Pool
- Headquarters Service Ferry Pools/Squadron
- Service Ferry Training Squadron
- Ferry Training Unit
- Ferry Training and Despatch Unit
- Ferry Training Unit

== Aircraft types ferried ==
Ferry Flight, Cardington
- Avro Anson I

No. 2 Ferry Pilots Pool

- Handley Page Heyford III
- Hawker Demon
- Avro Anson I
- Bristol Blenheim I
- Westland Lysander II
- North American Harvard I
- Lockheed Hudson I

No. 4 Ferry Pilots Pool

- Hawker Hector I
- Avro Anson I
- Bristol Beaufort I
- Hawker Hurricane I
- Handley Page Hampden I
- Fairey Battle Trainer
- Airspeed Oxford II
- Armstrong Whitworth Whitley V
- Bristol Blenheim IV
- Heston Phoenix II
- de Havilland Leopard Moth

Headquarters Service Ferry Pools/Squadron

- No ferry aircraft known

Service Ferry Training Squadron

- Bristol Blenheim
- Hawker Hurricane
- Curtiss Tomahawk
- Martin Maryland

Ferry Training Unit

- Airspeed Oxford I
- Bristol Bombay
- de Havilland Dominie I
- Heston Phoenix II
- Miles Monarch
- Bristol Blenheim I, IV & V
- Hawker Hurricane I & X
- Vickers Wellington IA, IC & XIII
- Bristol Beaufighter I
- Curtiss Tomahawk IIB
- Miles Master II & III
- Martin Maryland I
- Bristol Beaufort I
- de Havilland Mosquito II
- Lockheed Hudson III & IIIA
- Lockheed Ventura I
