= List of aircraft structural failures =

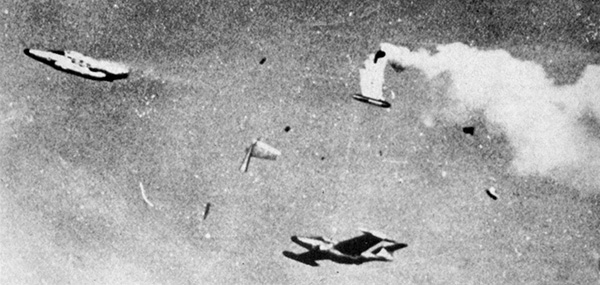
1952 International Aviation Exposition: Northrop F-89 Scorpion wing failure during flypast.

The list of aircraft accidents and incidents caused by structural failures summarizes notable accidents and incidents such as the 1933 United Airlines Chesterton Crash due to a bombing and a 1964 B-52 test that landed after the vertical stabilizer broke off. Loss of structural integrity during flight can be caused by:

- faulty design
- faulty maintenance
- manufacturing flaws
- pilot error
- weather conditions
- sabotage (e.g., an airliner bombing or takeover by a skyjacker).

List of aircraft accidents and incidents caused by structural failure
Date	Accident/incident	Location	Aircraft	Cause	Fatalities	Notes
1913-08-07	Death of S F Cody	United Kingdom	Cody Floatplane	"inherent structural weakness"	2	Broke up
1919-08-02	Airliner crash at Verona	Italy	Caproni Ca.48	Wing flutter followed by wing collapse	14, 15, or 17 (sources vary)	The crash killed all aboard
1921-08-23	1921 Humber crash	UK: Hull	R38 (ZR-2)	Weather combined with weakened hull	44	Deformation followed by fire & explosion
1925-09-03	Crash of the USS Shenandoah	Caldwell, Ohio, United States	USS Shenandoah (ZR-1)	Severe weather	14	Torn apart by turbulence
1930-07-23	Meopham air disaster	Meopham, Kent	Junkers F.13	Overload/metal fatigue	6	Tailplane weakened by turbulence and flutter
1933-10-10	United Airlines Chesterton Crash	Indiana, United States	Boeing 247	Bombing	7	Explosion severed tail section
1935-02-12	Loss of USS Macon (ZRS-5)	off California, United States	Akron class airship	Weather combined with unrepaired damage	2	Wind shear caused structural failure of the tail which damaged gas cells
1943-08-01	1943 Lambert Field CG-4A crash	St. Louis, United States	Waco CG-4 (Note: Accident aircraft 42-78839 had been built under license by contractor Robertson Aircraft Corporation.)	Manufacturing flaw	10	Loss of right-hand wing due to failure of defective wing strut fitting
1947-10-24	United Airlines Flight 608	USA: about 1.5 Miles southeast of Bryce Canyon Airport	Douglas DC-6	Pilot error and design flaw	52	Fire caused by failure of pilots to stop fuel transfer and design flaw. Fire eventually lead to an in-flight breakup.
1952-08-30	1952 F-89 airshow crash	Detroit, Michigan, United States	F-89 Scorpion	Design flaw	2	Wing broke off during flypast
1952-09-06	1952 Farnborough Airshow DH.110 crash	Farnborough, Hampshire, United Kingdom	de Havilland DH.110	Design flaw	31	Leading edge aeroelastic flutter caused the aircraft to breakup and crash into the crowd
1953-02-05	BOAC Flight 783	Jagalgori, near Calcutta, India	de Havilland Comet	Severe weather	43	Crashed following structural failure in severe turbulence
1953-02-06	National Airlines Flight 470	Gulf of Mexico	Douglas DC-6	Severe weather	46	Loss of control and structural failure in severe turbulence
1954-01-10	BOAC Flight 781	Mediterranean Sea	de Havilland Comet	Design flaw	35	Near Elba: roof fatigue fracture lead to decompression
1954-04-08	South African Airways Flight 201	Mediterranean Sea	de Havilland Comet	Design flaw	21	Near Naples: decompression due to fatigue
1955-11-01	United Air Lines Flight 629	Longmont, Colorado, United States	Douglas DC-6B	Bombing	44	Bomb placed in suitcase caused in-flight breakup
1957-04-17	1957 Aqaba Valetta accident	Near Aqaba, Jordan	Vickers Valetta	Severe weather	27	Design strength of left-hand wing exceeded during probable loss of control in severe clear-air turbulence
1957-05-31	1957 McNabs Island RCN Banshee crash	Near Halifax, Nova Scotia, Canada	F2H-3 Banshee	Manufacturing flaw	1	Loss of outer starboard wing due to improperly manufactured fittings in folding wing mechanism
1958-09-20	1958 Vulcan crash at RAF Syerston	RAF Syerston, United Kingdom	Avro Vulcan prototype	Pilot error	7	Flew too fast during low pass exceeded g-limit of leading edge structure, aircraft disintegrated
1959-10-01	1959 Lightning crash	Irish Sea, United Kingdom	Lightning T.4 (first aircraft)	Fin collapse due to inertia coupling during high speed tests	0	first supersonic ejection by a UK pilot (M 1.7) Fin enlarged
1963-01-24	1963 Elephant Mountain B-52 crash	Maine, United States	B-52 Stratofortress	Unknowingly exceeded design capability	7	Loss of vertical stabilizer
1963-01-30	1963 B-52 crash in New Mexico	New Mexico, United States	B-52 Stratofortress	Unknowingly exceeded design capability	2	Near Mora: loss of vertical stabilizer
1964-01-04	1964 B-57 crash	Dayton, United States	NRB-57 Canberra	Mis-management of fuel system, causing CofG to be beyond its safe rearward limit	2	Both wings failed
1964-01-10	B-52 flight test of vertical stabilizer	New Mexico, United States	B-52 Stratofortress	Unknowingly exceeded design capability	0	Loss of vertical stabilizer, landed safely
1964-01-13	1964 Savage Mountain B-52 crash	Maryland, United States	B-52 Stratofortress	Unknowingly exceeded design capability	3	Loss of vertical stabilizer
1964-01-04	1964 USAF Thunderbird crash	Hamilton Field, California, United States	F-105 Thunderchief	Design flaw	1	Spine failure during 6G pitch-up at air show
1965-07-06	1965 Little Baldon Hastings accident	RAF Abingdon, Oxfordshire, United Kingdom	Handley Page Hastings	Design flaw	41	Right-hand elevator became uncontrollable due to metal fatigue-related failure of two bolts in elevator system
1966-03-05	BOAC Flight 911	Mount Fuji, Japan	Boeing 707-436	Severe weather	124	Severe clear-air turbulence, gust load over design limit lead to in-flight breakup
1966-08-06	Braniff Airways Flight 250	Nebraska, United States	BAC One-Eleven 203AE	Severe weather	42	Horizontal and vertical stabilizers detached in severe turbulence
1967-03-05	Lake Central Flight 527	Ohio, United States	Convair CV-580	Propeller manufacturing defect	38	Propeller broke apart; one of the blades punctured the fuselage, causing the forward section to break away
1967-06-23	Mohawk Airlines Flight 40	Pennsylvania, United States	BAC One-Eleven 204AF	Mechanical failure	34	Valve in the auxiliary power unit suffered a complete failure, spreading fire to the tailplane and causing a loss of pitch control
1967-11-15	X-15 Flight 3-65-97	Edwards AFB, United States	North American X-15	Pilot error	1	Loss of control followed by airframe failure
1968-05-03	Braniff Airways Flight 352	Near Dawson, Texas, United States	Lockheed L188A-Electra	Severe weather	85	Controlled flight into thunderstorm with severe turbulence causing in-flight breakup
1970-07-05	Air Canada Flight 621	Brampton, Ontario, Canada	McDonnell Douglas DC-8	Pilot error	109	Hard landing caused by crew error, causing engine No.4 and pylon to separate; further damage to the right wing caused leaking fuel to ignite and explode, causing the wing to break up and lead to the crash
1971-03-05	BEA Flight 706	Belgium	Vickers Vanguard	Inadequate maintenance: undetected corrosion	63	Near Aarsele: rear pressure bulkhead failure caused loss of tailplane
1972-06-12	American Airlines Flight 96	Detroit, Michigan, United States	MD DC-10	Design flaw	0	Cargo door locking mechanism failed causing door to separate from the aircraft and causing further damage; landed safely
1973-05-18	Aeroflot Flight 109	Chita, Soviet Union	Tupolev Tu-104	Terrorist bombing	81	Bomb put on board by hijacker
1974-03-03	Turkish Airlines Flight 981	Picardy, France	MD DC-10	Design flaw	346	Cargo door locking mechanism failed allowing door to separate from the aircraft; cabin floor collapsed, control cables severed, crashed into a forest
1976-04-14	Yacimientos Petroliferos Fiscales	Argentina: near Cutral-Co	Hawker Siddeley 748	Improper maintenance: undetected metal fatigue	34	Starboard wing failed outboard of engine
1977-05-14	1977 Dan-Air Boeing 707 crash	Near Lusaka Airport, Lusaka, Zambia	Boeing 707	Metal fatigue and aircraft design flaw	6	Structural failure of the right horizontal stabiliser due to metal fatigue and aircraft design flaw
1978-06-26	Helikopter Service Flight 165	North Sea, Norway	Sikorsky S-61	Fatigue	18	Rotor blade loosened after fatigue to the knuckle joint: crashed into the sea
1979-05-25	American Airlines Flight 191	Chicago, United States	MD DC-10	Improper maintenance	271 + 2 on ground	No.1 engine broke off due to faulty maintenance procedure; slats retracted, leading the plane to stall and crash
1981-06-02	NLM CityHopper Flight 431	Moerdijk, Netherlands	Fokker F28 Fellowship	Severe weather	17	Starboard wing detached from airframe due to loads exceeding design limits after the aircraft entered a tornado.
1982-03-11	Widerøe Flight 933	Gamvik, Norway	de Havilland Canada Twin Otter	Severe weather	15	Vertical stabilizer and rudder failed during clear-air turbulence
1985-06-23	Air India Flight 182	Atlantic Ocean off County Cork	Boeing 747	Terrorist bombing	329	Terrorist bomb placed in cargo hold
1985-08-12	Japan Airlines Flight 123	Mount Osutaka, Japan	Boeing 747SR	Improper maintenance	520	Faulty repair after same plane suffered a tailstrike: the rear bulkhead failed which caused the tail fin to fall off and rupture all four hydraulic systems. The crash remains the deadliest single-aircraft accident in aviation history.
1987-11-28	South African Airways Flight 295	Indian Ocean, 134 nautical miles (248 km) north-east of Mauritius,	Boeing 747	Fire	159	Catastrophic and contained cargo fire in rear cargo deck lead to the separation of tail section, an in-flight break up and a high-speed dive into ocean
1988-04-28	Aloha Airlines Flight 243	Hawaii, United States	Boeing 737	Improper adhesive bonding of fuselage lap joints	1	Corrosion and fatigue: 18 ft of roof separated from fuselage
1988-12-21	Pan Am Flight 103	Lockerbie, United Kingdom	Boeing 747	Terrorist bombing	259 + 11 on ground	Terrorist bomb in the forward luggage hold
1989-02-24	United Airlines Flight 811	Hawaii, United States	Boeing 747	Dirt on microswitch/short circuit	9	Cargo door opened (electrical fault), causing surrounding structure to fail leaving large hole; landed safely
1989-09-08	Partnair Flight 394	18 km north of Hirtshals, Denmark	Convair 580	Improper maintenance: use of counterfeit aircraft parts	55	Highest death toll involving a Convair 580; loosening of vertical stabilizer due to excessive wear on mounting bolts
1989-09-19	UTA Flight 772	Sahara Desert, Ténéré, Niger	McDonnell Douglas DC-10	Terrorist bombing	170	Bomb hidden in forward cargo hold detonated at 35,000 feet leading to in-flight break-up scattering debris over a wide area across the Sahara
1990-04-12	Widerøe Flight 839	Værøy, Norway	de Havilland Canada Twin Otter	Severe weather	5	Rudder and tailplane cracked during extreme winds
1990-06-10	British Airways Flight 5390	Didcot, United Kingdom	BAC One-Eleven	Faulty maintenance	0	Window separated from plane causing the pilot to be sucked out. First Officer successfully landed the plane in Southampton
1991-02-06	1991 Gulf War Boeing KC-135 accident	Near Jeddah, Saudi Arabia	Boeing KC-135 Stratotanker	Severe weather and wake turbulence	0	Due to excess maneuvering, the airframe was pushed to its limits. Two out of the four engines detached from the aircraft. The plane executed an emergency landing
1991-05-26	Lauda Air Flight 004	Phu Toei National Park, Amphoe Dan Chang, Thailand	Boeing 767-300ER	Manufacturing error: faulty thrust reverser	223	Thrust reverser in No.1 engine unexpectedly deployed while cruising at 35,000 ft causing it to bank sharply to the left and enter a high-speed dive and breaking up at roughly 4000 ft scattering wreckage over a wide area
1991-09-11	Continental Express Flight 2574	Texas, United States	Embraer 120 Brasilia	Improper maintenance	14	Failure of the horizontal stabilizer during flight due to misunderstanding during maintenance
1992-10-04	El Al Flight 1862	Bijlmermeer, Netherlands	Boeing 747	Corrosion in pylon fuse pin leading to metal fatigue	4 on board, 39 on ground	Engine No.3 separated from its pylon which caused the adjacent engine No.4 to also fall off, taking the slats with them; stall and crash on attempted landing
1996-07-17	TWA Flight 800	Moriches Inlet, near East Moriches, New York, United States	Boeing 747	Fuel tank explosion	230	Exploded, broke up, and crashed off the coast of Long Island 30 minutes after taking off from New York bound for Paris due to a catastrophic central fuel tank explosion resulting in the forward fuselage section, which included the main flight deck first class and a portion of business class, separating and causing the remaining section to climb, abruptly stall, and enter a high speed dive, causing the left wing to also separate and plunge into the Atlantic Ocean in flames
1997-06-26	Helikopter Service Flight 451	Norwegian Sea, Norway	Eurocopter AS 332L1 Super Puma	Fatigue	12	The accident was caused by a fatigue crack in the spline, which ultimately caused the power transmission shaft to fail. The helicopter crashed into the sea.
1997-12-19	SilkAir Flight 185	Musi River, Palembang, Indonesia	Boeing 737-300	Pilot suicide (disputed by NTSC)	104	Entered a high-speed vertical dive and broke up on its way down into the Musi River
1999-10-31	EgyptAir Flight 990	Atlantic Ocean, 100 km (62 mi) S of Nantucket	Boeing 767-300ER	Pilot suicide (disputed)	217	Abruptly descended rapidly before rapidly climbing before finally entering a high-speed dive, causing the No.1 engine and portions of the wings to break off on its way down towards the ocean
2000-01-31	Alaska Airlines Flight 261	Pacific Ocean near Anacapa Island	McDonnell Douglas MD-83	Maintenance intervals extended beyond safe limit	88	Lack of lubrication causing structural failure of the jackscrew on the horizontal stabiliser resulting in aircraft descending inverted into sea
2001-11-12	American Airlines Flight 587	Queens, New York City, United States	Airbus A300	Pilot error	265	Overuse of rudder leading to loss of vertical stabilizer
2002-04-30	2002 Eglin Air Force Base F-15 crash	Gulf of Mexico	F-15 Eagle	Undetected corrosion	1	Near Eglin AFB: port fin leading edge failed during test dive
2002-05-25	China Airlines Flight 611	Taiwan Strait near Penghu Islands, Taiwan	Boeing 747	Faulty maintenance, metal fatigue	225	Tailstrike leading to faulty repair: tail section broke off, causing aircraft to disintegrate
2003-02-01	Space Shuttle Columbia disaster	Texas, United States	Space Shuttle	Design flaw	7	Damaged TPS during launch, breakup during reentry
2005-12-19	Chalk's Ocean Airways Flight 101	Miami Beach, Florida, United States	Grumman Turbo-Mallard	Improper maintenance	20	In-flight wing failure due to metal fatigue
2007-01-01	Adam Air Flight 574	Makassar Strait off Majene, Sulawesi, Indonesia	Boeing 737-400	Pilot error	102	Spatial disorientation, inertial reference system (IRS) malfunction gradually banked to the left and entered a high-speed dive and broke up on its way down
2008-05-30	Pilatus EC-JXH crash	Spain	Pilatus PC-6		2	Wing failure
2014-10-31	VSS Enterprise crash	Near the Mojave Desert, California, United States	Scaled Composites Model 339 SpaceShipTwo	Pilot error and design flaw	1	Premature activation of the air brake device used for atmospheric re-entry lead to an in-flight breakup
2015-10-31	Metrojet Flight 9268	North Sinai Governorate, Egypt	Airbus A321-200	Terrorist bombing	224	Bomb that was smuggled into rear cargo hold disguised as a soft drink can contained four packs of dynamite, causing the tail section to separate and lead to an in-flight break up, scattering the wreckage in the Sinai Desert
2016-05-19	EgyptAir Flight 804	Mediterranean Sea	Airbus A320-200	Explosion/fire caused by oxygen leak	66	Accident was caused by oxygen leak in the cockpit; the following combustion and explosion ignited by the pilot's cigarette caused a fire and the break-up of the airplane into the Mediterranean Sea
2017-10-07	2017 United States Marine Corps KC-130 crash	Leflore County, Mississippi, United States	Lockheed KC-130T Hercules	Improper maintenance	16	Accident was caused by improper repairs conducted in 2011 on a corroded propeller blade
2025-11-04	UPS Airlines Flight 2976	Louisville, Kentucky, United States	McDonnell Douglas MD-11F	Under investigation	15	Left engine detached during takeoff roll. Under investigation
2025-11-10	2025 Turkish Air Force Lockheed C-130 crash	Rustavi, Georgia	Lockheed C-130 Hercules	Under Investigation	20	The aircraft broke into three pieces, accident is still under Investigation.

== See also ==
- List of building and structure collapses
- List of airliner shootdown incidents
