= 1963 in aviation =

This is a list of aviation-related events from 1963.

== Events ==
- Violating a 1959 requirement that all aircraft operating from the aircraft carrier Minas Gerais - which never has operated aircraft - belong to the Brazilian Air Force, the Brazilian Navy establishes an air group of its own for the carrier and smuggles aircraft purchased abroad into the country for the air group. Air force reconnaissance aircraft discover the naval carrier aircraft, causing tension between the two services.
- The North Vietnamese Air Force and Air Defense Force merge to form a unified Air and Air Defense Force.

=== January ===
- January 2 – The Battle of Ap Bac in South Vietnam is the first time that Viet Cong forces stand and fight against a major South Vietnamese attack. At the outset, Viet Cong ground fire shoots down a United States Army UH-1 attack helicopter and four U.S. Army CH-21 transport helicopters as they arrive at their landing zone. Republic of Vietnam Air Force C-123 Provider transport planes drop about 300 South Vietnamese paratroopers later in the day.
- January 7 – Aeroflot launches service from Moscow to Havana, Cuba, using Tupolev Tu-114 turboprop airliners.
- January 24 – A United States Air Force B-52C Stratofortress loses its vertical stabilizer in turbulence and crashes on Elephant Mountain, in Piscataquis County, Maine, killing seven of the nine-man crew.

=== February ===
- The rules of engagement for American armed helicopter crews in South Vietnam are relaxed to allow them to fire at clearly identified Viet Cong forces who are threatening American helicopters without waiting for the Viet Cong to fire first. Previously, they had been permitted to open fire on Viet Cong forces only if the Viet Cong fired first.
- Commercial airline flights between the United States and Cuba are "temporarily" suspended. They will not resume until August 2016.
- February 1
  - Descending to land at Esenboğa International Airport in Ankara, Turkey, Middle East Airlines Flight 265 – a Vickers 754D Viscount (registration OD-ADE) flying to Ankara from Nicosia, Cyprus – collides with a Turkish Air Force Douglas C-47 Skytrain, slicing off the C-47's left horizontal stabilizer with its No. 3 propeller. The collision tears the Viscount's right side open, and some passengers aboard the Viscount are sucked out of the aircraft. Both planes crash in a residential area of Ankara, killing all 14 people on the Viscount, all three people aboard the C-47, and 87 people on the ground.
  - The United States Army activates the 11th Air Assault Division (Test) to test the concept of helicopter assault by ground forces.
- February 3 – A Slick Airways Lockheed L-1049H Super Constellation (N9740Z) on a ferry flight with a limited complement of avionics due to maintenance issues, hits runway approach lights at San Francisco International Airport southeast of San Francisco, California during an instrument approach. It crashes, causing killing two of its three crew members and two of its five non-revenue passengers. The accident investigation finds that the crew continued an instrument approach "after adequate visual reference was lost below authorized minimums" and that inadequate safety briefings likely contributed to the number of injuries and deaths.
- February 8 – The Royal Navy conducts the world's first experimental trials of a vertical take-off and landing fixed-wing aircraft aboard an aircraft carrier, testing the Hawker Siddeley P.1127 prototype aboard HMS Ark Royal.
- February 12 – Northwest Airlines Flight 705, a Boeing 720-051B, breaks up in mid-air during a severe thunderstorm and crashes into the Florida Everglades west of Miami, Florida, shortly after takeoff from Miami International Airport, killing all 43 people on board.
- February 14 – The Indian Air Force receives its first batch of Soviet fighters, Mikoyan-Gurevich MiG-21s (NATO reporting name "Fishbed").

=== March ===
- The U.S. Army completes a six-month test of the Bell UH-1 Iroquois helicopter (the "Huey") in an armed escort role, evaluating the operations of the Utility Tactical Transport Helicopter Company's operations escorting CH-21C Shawnee transport helicopters in South Vietnam, concluding that the value of attack helicopters in suppressing enemy fire during the landing phase of a helicopter operation justified the fielding of attack helicopter units.
- March 5 - Country music performers Patsy Cline, Cowboy Copas, and Hawkshaw Hawkins are among four people killed in the crash of a Piper PA-24 Comanche near Camden, Tennessee.
- March 18 - The Dassault Balzac makes its first transitions from vertical to horizontal flight and back
- March 29 – Alisarda is founded. It operates initially as an air taxi and general charter airline.

=== April ===
- Air Djibouti is founded. It will begin flight operations in April 1964.
- April 13
  - United States Marine Corps UH-34 Seahorse transport helicopters based at Da Nang, South Vietnam, airlift 435 South Vietnamese troops to attack a suspected Viet Cong stronghold in mountains along the Thu Bồn River. For the first time, Marine Corps helicopters receive attack helicopter escort in the form of United States Army UH-1B gunships.
  - Americans Don Piccard and Ed Yost become the first people to cross the English Channel in a hot-air balloon. The 3¾-hour flight from Rye, England, to Gravelines, France, reaches an altitude of 13,000 feet (4,000 meters).
- April 22 – The United States Supreme Court rules in Colorado Anti-Discrimination Commission v. Continental Airlines that Continental Airlines unlawfully discriminated against African-American pilot Marlon Green when it rejected him for employment in 1957 and hired five less-qualified white applicants. The ruling paves the way for the hiring of ethnic minority members as commercial airline pilots in the United States. Continental eventually hires Green in 1965.
- April 27-May 20 - U.S. Marine Corps transport helicopters are heavily involved in airlifting South Vietnamese troops during Operation Bach Phuong XI, a South Vietnamese offensive against Viet Cong forces near Do Xa, South Vietnam.
- April 27 - The U.S. Marine Corps loses its first aircraft to enemy action in Vietnam, a UH-34D transport helicopter shot down by Viet Cong ground fire near Do Xa, South Vietnam.
- April 30 – Delayed since her planned departure on April 25 by bad weather, Betty Miller, a flight instructor dubbed "the flying housewife" by the press, takes off from Oakland, California, in a Piper PA-23-160 Apache H, beginning a flight across the Pacific Ocean to deliver the plane to its owner in Australia. She completes the first leg of the flight later in the day, arriving at Honolulu, Hawaii, after a flight of about 2,400 miles (3,860 km) in 17 hours 3 minutes. She becomes the first woman to make a solo flight from Oakland to Honolulu.

=== May ===
- The Israeli Air Force acquires its first 25 Dassault Mirage IIICJ fighters.
- May 13 – Delivering a Piper PA-23-160 Apache H to its owner, Betty Miller arrives at Eagle Farm Airport in Brisbane, Australia, completing a flight from Oakland, California, begun on April 30. She becomes both the first woman to complete a solo transpacific flight and the first pilot to fly across the Pacific Ocean without a navigator. During her trip — in addition to her flight on April 30 of about 2,400 miles (3,860 km) in 17 hours 3 minutes to Honolulu, Hawaii, where she is delayed for four days by radio repairs — she has made a 1,700-mile (2,740 km) flight from Honolulu to Canton Island in 13 hours 6 minutes and a 1,250-mile (2,010 km) flight from Canton Island to Fiji in 8 hours 27 minutes. During her planned final leg from Fiji to Brisbane, she had diverted to Nouméa, New Caledonia, to avoid severe weather before completing the journey with a Nouméa–Brisbane flight. During her 13-day trip she has flown about 7,400 miles (11,900 km), spending 51 hours 38 minutes in the air and averaging 140 mph (225 km/h).
- May 28 – Standard Airways Flight 388C, Lockheed L-1049G Super Constellation registration N189S on a military charter flight, impacted the ground short of the runway at Manhattan Municipal Airport in manhattan, Kansas, United States when, just before landing, reverse pitch engaged on the number three engine, dipping the right wing which made contact with the ground. The aircraft was destroyed by fire but only after the six crew and 64 passengers safely evacuated. No crew and only one passenger were seriously injured. The cause was traced to "improper maintenance practices and inspection procedures."

=== June ===
- June 3 – Northwest Airlines Flight 293, a Douglas DC-7C, crashes in the Pacific Ocean west-southwest of Annette Island, Alaska, off the coast of British Columbia, Canada, killing all 101 people on board.
- June 5 – President John F. Kennedy announces during a speech at the United States Air Force Academy that the United States Government would team with private industry to quickly develop "the prototype of a commercially successful supersonic transport superior to that being built in any other country," a reference to the British-French Concorde and the Soviet Tupolev Tu-144 (NATO reporting name "Charger"). His statement gives rise to the Boeing 2707 ("SST") project.
- June 7 – Middle East Airlines merges with Air Liban, giving Air France a 30 percent ownership stake in the merged airline, which becomes known as Middle East Airlines–Air Liban.
- June 8 – The National Museum of Naval Aviation opens at Naval Air Station Pensacola in Pensacola, Florida.
- June 14 – Flying a Dassault Mirage IIIR, French aviator Jacqueline Auriol sets a women's world speed record of 1,266.78 mph (2,038.68 km/h). It is her fifth women's world speed record since 1951 and her final one.
- June 21 – After his F-8 Crusader fighter catches fire during in-flight refueling from a U.S. Air Force KC-97 Stratofreighter tanker aircraft over the Pacific Ocean during a flight from California to Hawaii, United States Marine Corps First Lieutenant Cliff Judkins ejects. His main parachute fails to open, and he falls 15,000 feet (4,600 meters) into the ocean. Although he suffers several serious injuries, he survives and is rescued.
- June 23 – Piloted by United States Air Force Major Robert A. Rushworth, a North American X-15-3 reaches the threshold of space, achieving an altitude of 285,000 feet (87,000 meters).

=== July ===
- July 2 – Mohawk Airlines Flight 121, a Martin 4-0-4, crashes on takeoff into a heavy thunderstorm at Rochester, New York, in the United States, killing seven of the 43 people on board and injuring all 36 survivors.
- July 3
  - National Airways Corporation Flight 441, a Douglas DC-3C, flies into a vertical rock face in New Zealand's Kaimai Ranges near Mount Ngatamahinerua, killing all 23 people on board.
  - The Peruvian Navy reestablishes a naval air arm, Peruvian Naval Aviation.
- July 19 – Joe Walker flies a North American X-15 to a record altitude of 106,010 metres (347,800 feet) on X-15 Flight 90. Exceeding an altitude of 100 km (62.1 statute miles, 54 nautical miles), this flight qualifies as a human spaceflight under international convention.
- July 20 – The U.S. Air Force C-47 Skytrain Extol Pink evacuates wounded Vietnamese at night under heavy fire. Its six-man crew receives the MacKay Trophy for the flight.
- July 27 – United Arab Airlines Flight 869, a de Havilland Comet 4C, crashes into the Arabian Sea on approach to Bombay-Santa Cruz Airport in Bombay, India, in heavy rain and turbulence, killing all 63 people on board. Among the dead are 26 Boy Scouts from the Philippines on their way to the 11th World Scout Jamboree in Greece.

=== August ===
- August 21 – An Aeroflot Tupolev Tu-124 ditches in the Neva River at Leningrad in the Soviet Union without a single injury or fatality.
- August 23 – National Aeronautics and Space Administration (NASA) research pilot Joseph A. Walker flies the third North American X-15 into space, setting a world altitude record for aircraft of 354,200 feet (67.08 miles (107.95 km). It is Walker's second suborbital X-15 flight, making him the first person to reach space twice.
- August 27 – Jamaica Air Service Ltd. is founded, jointly owned by the Government of Jamaica, the British Overseas Airways Corporation (BOAC), and British West Indian Airways (BWIA). BWIA's employees in Jamaica transfer to the new airline.
- August 28 – Two U.S. Air Force KC-135 Stratotankers collide over the Atlantic Ocean and crash.
- August 31 – South Korea establishes the Ministry of Construction and Transportation's Aviation Bureau as its national civil aviation authority.

=== September ===
- September 1 – Sued over its name for trademark violation by the West German airline Lufthansa – which had purchased the rights to the name of the defunct pre-1945 airline Deutsche Luft Hansa in August 1954 – and as a result unable to join the International Air Transport Association, the East German national airline Deutsche Lufthansa (DLH) is liquidated. Its staff, fleet, and route network are transferred to Interflug, which takes over as East Germany's national airline.
- September 4 – Shortly after takeoff from Zurich-Kloten Airport in Kloten near Zürich, Switzerland, Swissair Flight 306, a Sud Aviation SE-210 Caravelle III, catches fire, leading to hydraulic failure and a loss of control. The plane crashes near Dürrenäsch, Switzerland, killing all 80 people on board. Among the dead are 43 people – one-fifth of the population – of the village of Humlikon, Switzerland, traveling together to visit a farm test site at Geneva.
- September 14 – The Tokyo Convention – officially the "Convention on Offences and Certain Other Acts Committed on Board Aircraft" – is concluded in Tokyo, Japan. It establishes that at least one state, specifically the one in which the aircraft is registered, will take jurisdiction over the suspect in the event of an in-flight criminal offense that jeopardizes the safety of an aircraft or people on an aircraft during international air navigation or an intention to commit such an offense, and it provides for situations in which other states may also have jurisdiction. It also recognizes certain powers and immunities of the pilot in command, who on international flights may restrain any person or persons he or she has reasonable cause to believe is committing or is about to commit an offense liable to interfere with the safety of persons or property on board the aircraft or who is jeopardizing good order and discipline aboard the aircraft, the first time this has been recognized in international aviation law. The convention will go into force on December 4, 1969.

=== October ===
- In an exercise named Operation Big Lift, the United States Air Force airlifts an entire armored division of 15,000 troops to Europe within five days.
- October 1 – The French airlines Transports Aériens Intercontinentaux (TAI) and Union Aéromaritime de Transport (UAT) merge to form the new airline Union de Transports Aériens (UTA).
- October 2 – Second British Short SC.1 VTOL research aircraft, XG905, flying from Belfast Harbour Airport, crashes due to a control malfunction, killing the test pilot, J. R. Green.
- October 16 – In Operation Greased Lightning, an unmodified B-58 Hustler bomber of the U.S. Air Force's 305th Bombardment Wing named Greased Lightning sets a new speed record by flying nonstop from Tokyo to London nonstop, passing over via Alaska, Canada, and Greenland, and covering the 14,850-kilometer (9,230-mile); 8,028-nautical mile) distance in 8 hours, 35 minutes, 20.4 seconds, at an average speed of 938 mph (1,510 km/h), despite having to slow five times for aerial refueling. The B-58 flies at Mach 2 for most of the flight – maintaining an average cruise speed over a five-hour period of 2,276 km/h (1,414 mph; 1,229 kn) at an altitude of 16,160 meters (53,020 feet) – throttling back to subsonic speeds only for the last hour after losing an afterburner; the reduction in speed in the flight's late stages results in an average speed for the entire trip of about Mach 1.5. In addition to the Tokyo-London speed record, the flight also sets speed records for the leg from Tokyo to Anchorage, Alaska, which the B-58 covers in 3 hours, 9 minutes, 42 seconds at an average speed of 1,093.4 mph (1,759.7 km/h), and for the leg from Anchorage to London, which it covers in 5 hours, 24 minutes, 54 seconds at an average speed of 826.9 mph (1,330.8 km/h). As of 2017, the Tokyo-Anchorage leg of the flight remains the longest supersonic flight in history. The flight is the last record-setting attempt by a B-58, which has set 19 recognized speed and altitude world records, the most in history by any combat aircraft.
- October 22 – During its flight development program, the BAC One-Eleven airliner prototype, G-ASHG, crashes, killing the entire crew of seven, including test pilot M. J. Lithgow. The investigation of the accident reveals that it resulted from a deep stall caused by the aircraft assuming an unexpected and dangerously high angle of attack, and remedial measures will be of great use worldwide in designing aircraft that have a T-tail and rear-mounted engine configuration.
- October 28 – Belfast Aldergrove opens as the principal airport for Northern Ireland, civilian facilities transferring from Nutts Corner.

=== November ===
- November 8 – Finnair aircraft OH-LCA, Aero Flight 217, crashes before landing at Mariehamn Airport in Åland
- November 22 – In the aftermath of the assassination earlier in the day of President John F. Kennedy, the Vice President, Lyndon B. Johnson, is sworn in as his successor aboard the Air Force One aircraft SAM 26000, a Boeing VC-137C Stratoliner, on the ground at Dallas Love Field in Dallas, Texas, the only U.S. president to be sworn in aboard an aircraft. As he is sworn in, the aircraft is starting its engines for a flight to carry Kennedy's body and Johnson to Andrews Air Force Base in Maryland.
- November 28 – Six hijackers armed with machine guns take over an Avensa airliner – either a Convair CV-340 or Convair CV-440 – with 17 people on board during a domestic flight in Venezuela from Ciudad Bolívar to Caracas and force it to circle over Ciudad Bolívar while they drop propaganda leaflets urging Venezuelans not to vote in the upcoming national elections. They then force the airliner's crew to fly them to Port of Spain on Trinidad in Trinidad and Tobago, where they surrender to the authorities.
- November 29 – Five minutes after takeoff from Montreal/Dorval Airport in Montreal, Quebec, Canada, Trans-Canada Air Lines Flight 831, a Douglas DC-8-54CF, crashes near Ste-Thérèse-de-Blainville, Quebec, killing all 118 people on board. Among the dead is Donald Turnbull, the son of inventor Wallace Rupert Turnbull. It is the deadliest aviation accident ever to occur in Canada at the time.

=== December ===
- Aero Trasporti Italiani (ATI) is founded as a subsidiary of Alitalia to take over secondary domestic routes in Italy operated by the Alitalia subsidiary Società Aerea Mediterranea (SAM). ATI will begin flight operations in June 1964.
- December 8 – Lightning strikes the Pan American World Airways Boeing 707-121 Clipper Tradewind, operating as Flight 214, igniting fuel vapor and causing an explosion which blows part of the left wing off the aircraft. The plane crashes near Elkton, Maryland, killing all 81 people on board. As a result of the tragedy, the U.S. Federal Aviation Administration orders the installation of lightning discharge wicks or static dischargers on all commercial jets flying inside U.S. airspace.
- December 9 – By royal decree of King Hussein, Alia – the future Royal Jordanian – is established as the flag carrier of Jordan.
- December 15 – Alia – the future Royal Jordanian – begins flight operations, offering service between Amman, Jordan, and Kuwait City, Kuwait, Beirut, Lebanon, and Cairo, Egypt, using a fleet of two Handley Page Dart Heralds and a Douglas DC-7.

== First flights ==
=== January ===
- January 2 - Ilyushin IL-62
- January 9 - Yakovlev Yak-36 - 1st tethered hover
- January 17 - Short SC.7 Skyvan
- January 21 – Fairchild Hiller FH-1100
- January 27 - Aero Commander 1121 Jet Commander
- January 26 - Hiller OH-5

=== February ===
- February 9 - Boeing 727
- February 25 - Transall C.160
- February 27 – Hughes OH-6 Cayuse

=== March ===
- March 10 – Dabos JD.24P D'Artagnan
- March 26 - Hunting H.126

=== April ===
- April 10 - EWR VJ 101
- April 18 – Northrop X-21

=== May ===
- May 4 – Dassault Falcon 20
- May 27 – McDonnell F-4C Phantom II, first United States Air Force version of the F-4 Phantom II

=== June ===
- June 29 - Saab 105

=== July ===
- July 11 – Bede BD-1
- July 29 – Tupolev Tu-134 (NATO reporting name "Crusty")

=== August ===
- August 1 – PZL-104 Wilga (Wilga 2 prototype)
- August 7 – Lockheed YF-12
- August 16 – NASA M2-F1
- August 20 – BAC One-Eleven prototype G-ASHG

=== September ===
- September 14 – Mitsubishi MU-2

=== October ===
- October 2 – Short SC.7 Skyvan - turboprop powered second prototype
- October 7 - Learjet 23 prototype, the very first Learjet built.

=== December ===
- December 17 - C-141 Starlifter
- December 17 – Matra Jupiter
- December 21 - Hawker Siddeley Andover

== Entered service ==
- Champion Lancer
- Lim-6bis in the Polish Air Force
- Early 1963 – Westland Scout with the British Army′s Army Air Corps

=== February ===
- A-6A Intruder with VA-42 Green Pawns of US Navy

=== August ===
- Bell UH-1D Iroquois (Bell Model 205) with United States Army 11th Air Assault Division

=== September ===
- Antonov An-24 ("Coke") with Aeroflot (passenger service)

=== November ===
- McDonnell F-4C Phantom II with the United States Air Force

== Retirements ==
- SUMPAC (Southampton University Man-Powered Aircraft)

== Deadliest crash ==
The deadliest crash of this year was Trans-Canada Air Lines Flight 831, a Douglas DC-8 which crashed shortly after taking off from Montreal, Quebec, Canada on 29 November, killing all 118 people on board.
