= Structural integrity and failure =

Ability of a structure to support a designed structural load without breaking

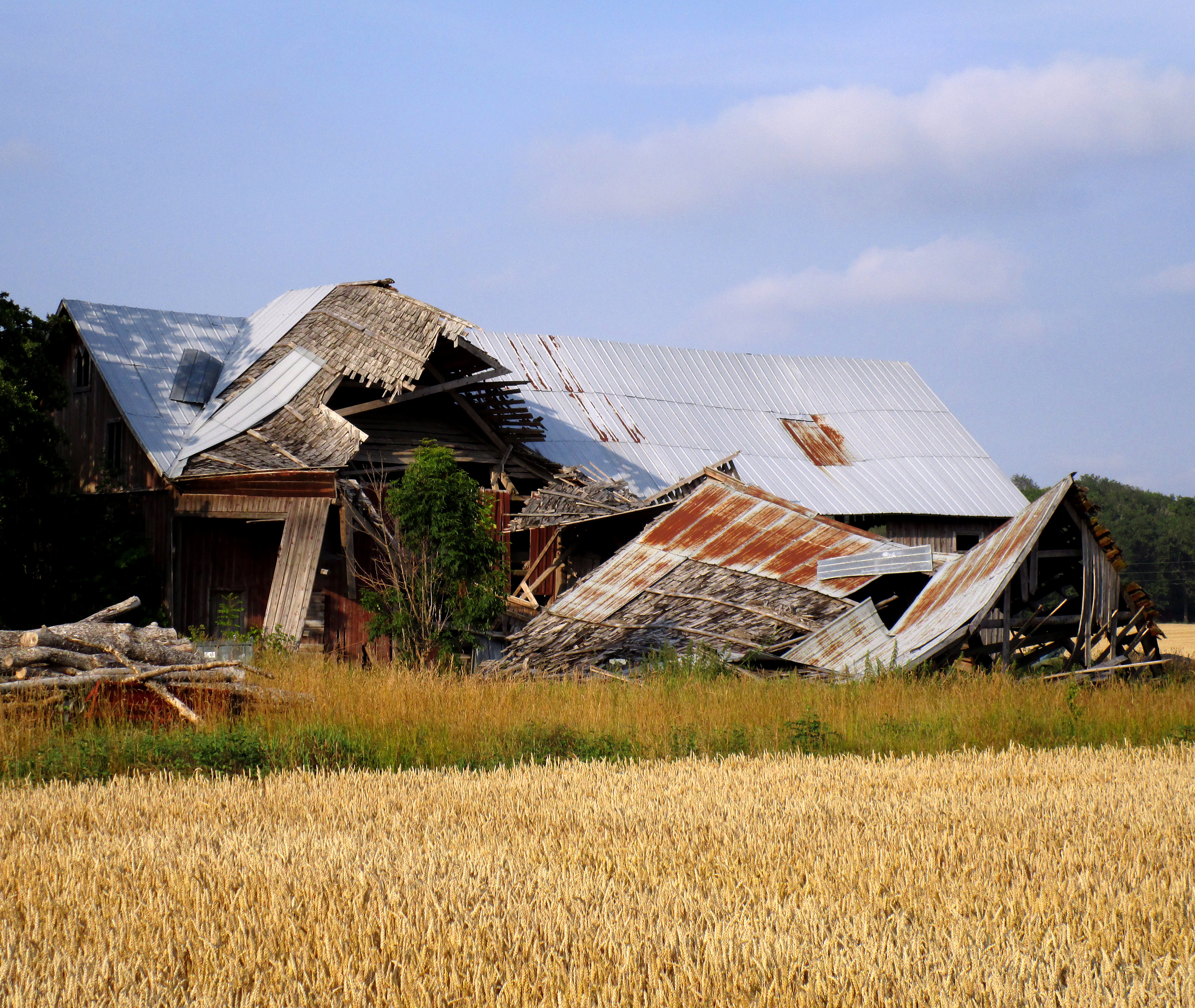
A collapsed barn at Hörsne-Bara on the Swedish island of Gotland.

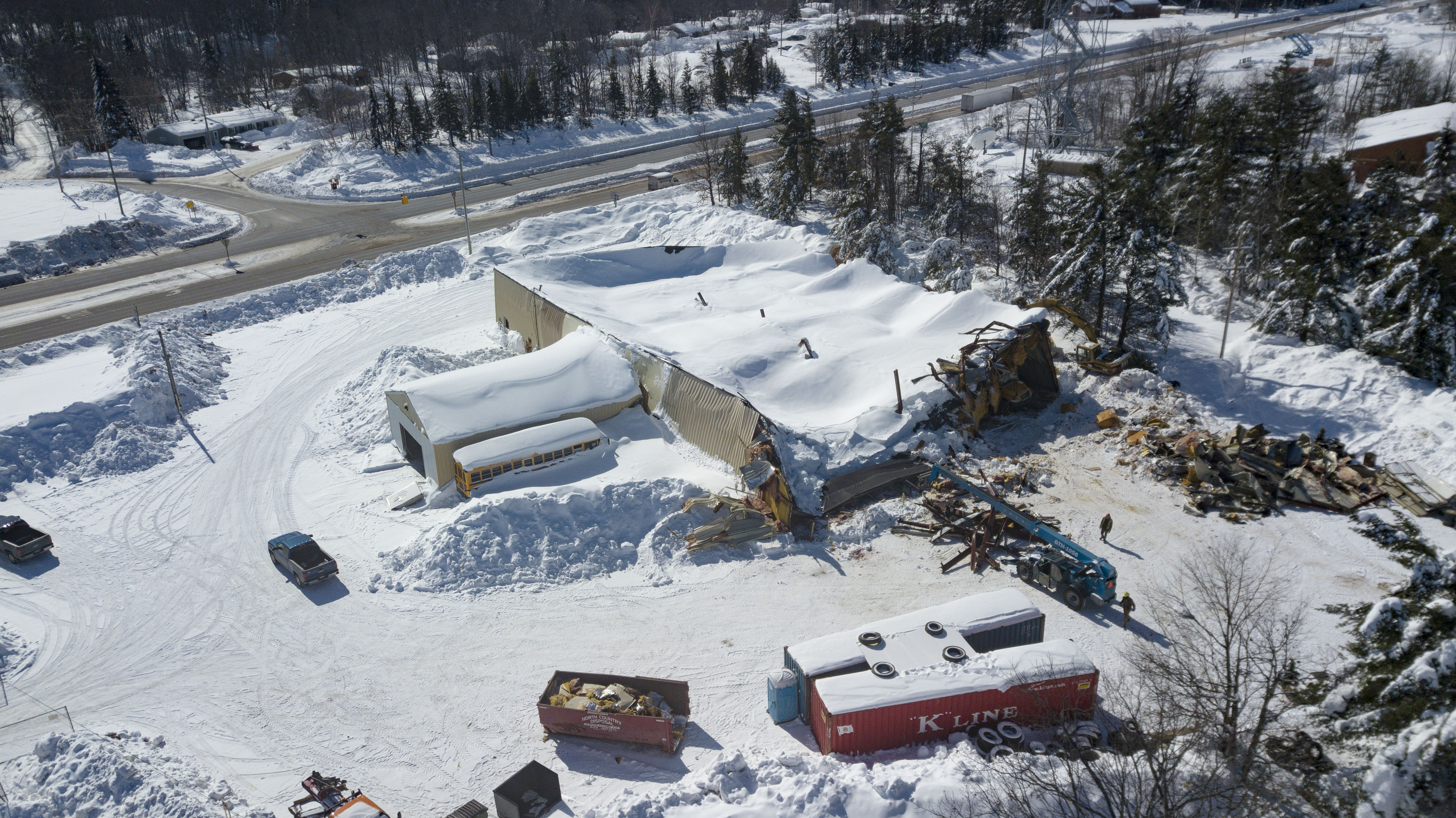
A building collapse due to the weight of accumulated snow in Negaunee, Michigan, United States.

Structural integrity and failure is an aspect of engineering that deals with the ability of a structure to support a designed structural load (weight, force, etc.) without breaking, and includes the study of past structural failures in order to prevent failures in future designs.

Structural integrity is the ability of an item—either a structural component or a structure consisting of many components—to hold together under a load, including its own weight, without breaking or deforming excessively. It assures that the construction will perform its designed function during reasonable use, for as long as its intended life span. Items are constructed with structural integrity to prevent catastrophic failure, which can result in injuries, severe damage, death, and/or monetary losses.

Structural failure refers to the loss of structural integrity, or the loss of load-carrying structural capacity in either a structural component or the structure itself. Structural failure is initiated when a material is stressed beyond its strength limit, causing fracture or excessive deformations; one limit state that must be accounted for in structural design is ultimate failure strength. In a well-designed system, a localized failure should not cause immediate or even progressive collapse of the entire structure.

== Overview ==
Structural integrity is the ability of a structure to withstand an intended load without failing due to fracture, deformation, or fatigue. It is a concept often used in engineering to produce items that will serve their designed purposes and remain functional for a desired service life.

To construct an item with structural integrity, an engineer must first consider a material's mechanical properties, such as toughness, strength, weight, hardness, and elasticity, and then determine the size and shape necessary for the material to withstand the desired load for a long life. Since members can neither break nor bend excessively, they must be both stiff and tough. A very stiff material may resist bending, but unless it is sufficiently tough, it may have to be very large to support a load without breaking. On the other hand, a highly elastic material will bend under a load even if its high toughness prevents fracture.

Furthermore, each component's integrity must correspond to its individual application in any load-bearing structure. Bridge supports need a high yield strength, whereas the bolts that hold them need good shear and tensile strength. Springs need good elasticity, but lathe tooling needs high rigidity. In addition, the entire structure must be able to support its load without its weakest links failing, as this can put more stress on other structural elements and lead to cascading failures.

== History ==
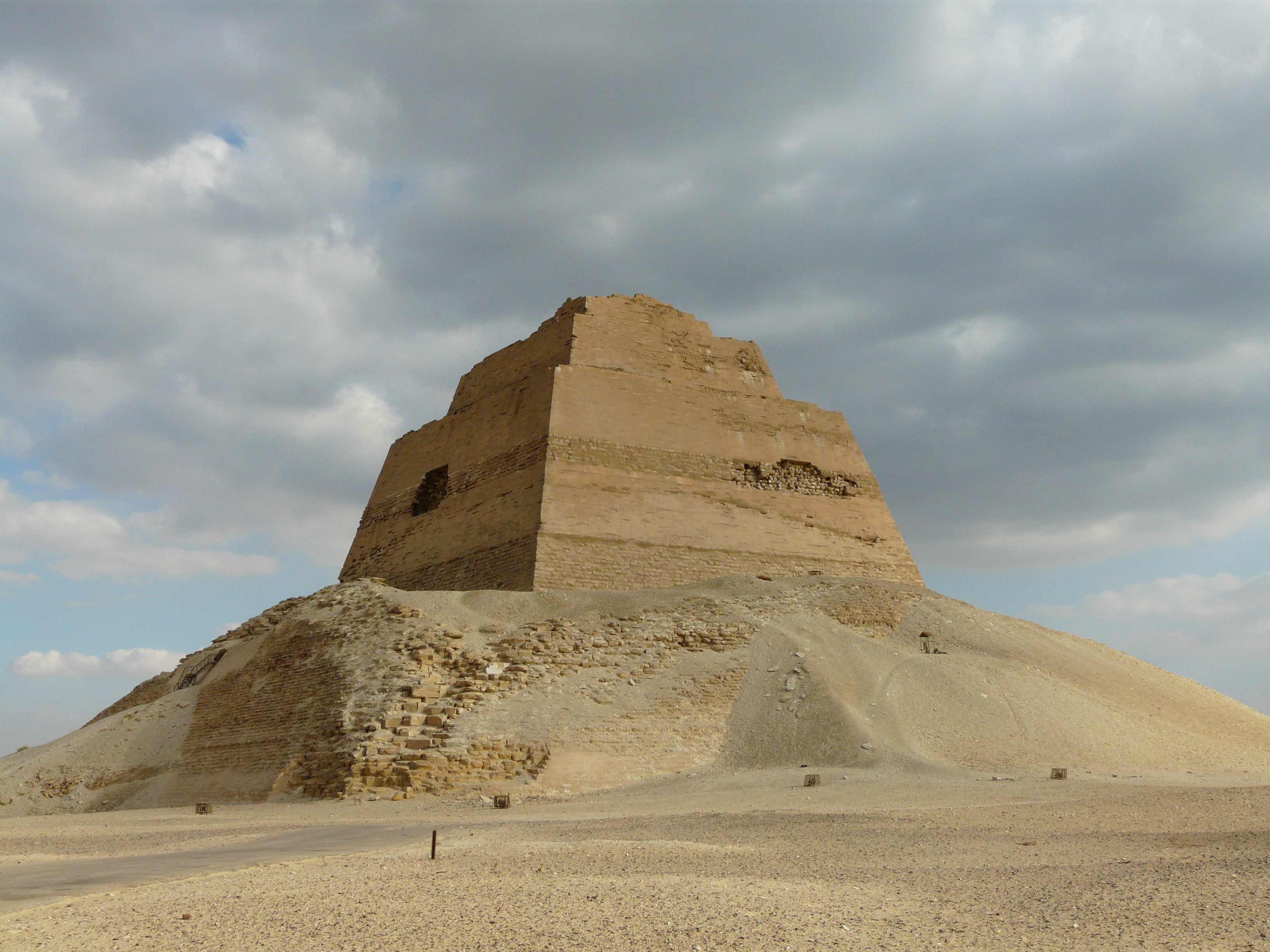
The Pyramid at Meidum was the second built by the ancient Egyptians around 2600 BC. It suffered from many structural defects, causing it to collapse during construction and leaving the inner core standing in a pile of rubble, which provided one of the earliest known lessons in large-scale building.

The need to build structures with integrity goes back as far as recorded history. Houses needed to be able to support their own weight, plus the weight of the inhabitants. Castles needed to be fortified to withstand assaults from invaders. Tools needed to be strong and tough enough to do their jobs.

In ancient times there were no mathematical formulas to predict the integrity of a structure. Builders, blacksmiths, carpenters, and masons relied on a system of trial and error (learning from past failures), experience, and apprenticeship to make safe and sturdy structures. Historically, safety and longevity were ensured by overcompensating, for example, using 20 tons of concrete when 10 tons would do. Galileo Galilei was one of the first to take the strength of materials into account in 1638, in his treatise Dialogues of Two New Sciences. However, mathematical ways to calculate such material properties did not begin to develop until the 19th century. The science of fracture mechanics, as it exists today, was not developed until the 1920s, when Alan Arnold Griffith studied the brittle fracture of glass.

Starting in the 1940s, the infamous failures of several new technologies made a more scientific method for analyzing structural failures necessary. During World War II, over 200 welded-steel ships broke in half due to brittle fracture, caused by stresses created from the welding process, temperature changes, and by the stress concentrations at the square corners of the bulkheads. In the 1950s, several De Havilland Comets exploded in mid-flight due to stress concentrations at the corners of their squared windows, which caused cracks to form and the pressurized cabins to explode. Boiler explosions, caused by failures in pressurized boiler tanks, were another common problem during this era, and caused severe damage. The growing sizes of bridges and buildings led to even greater catastrophes and loss of life. This need to build constructions with structural integrity led to great advances in the fields of material sciences and fracture mechanics.

== Types of failure ==
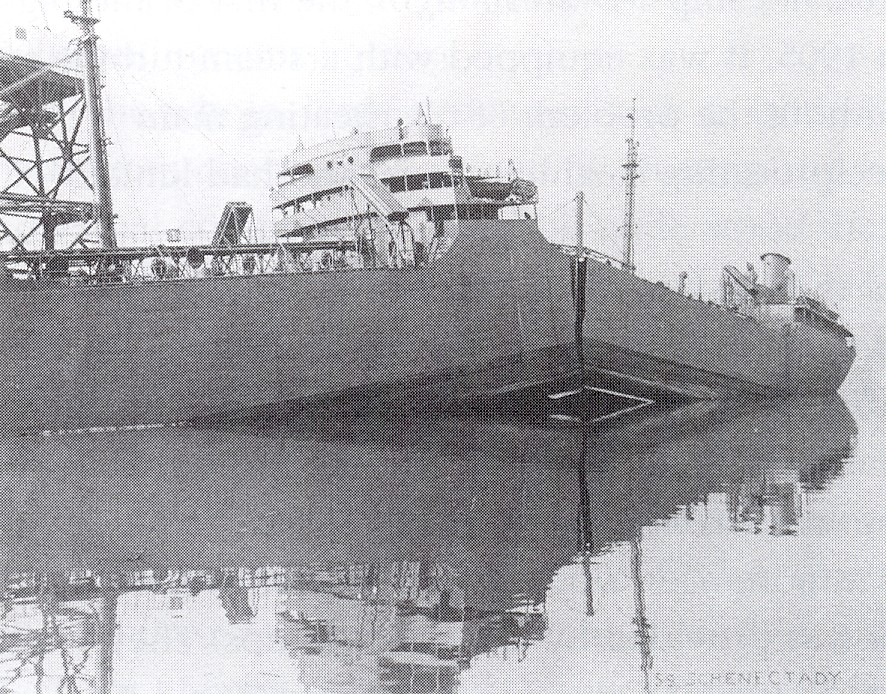
The American oil tanker SS Schenectady split in half in 1943 while sitting in a calm harbor, with a bang that could be heard "a mile away". The failure was attributed to weld stresses in the vicinity of squared bulkheads.

Structural failure can occur from many types of problems, most of which are unique to different industries and structural types. However, most can be traced to one of five main causes.

- The first is that the structure is not strong and tough enough to support the load, due to either its size, shape, or choice of material. If the structure or component is not strong enough, catastrophic failure can occur when the structure is stressed beyond its critical stress level.
- The second type of failure is from fatigue or corrosion, caused by instability in the structure's geometry, design or material properties. These failures usually begin when cracks form at stress points, such as squared corners or bolt holes too close to the material's edge. These cracks grow as the material is repeatedly stressed and unloaded (cyclic loading), eventually reaching a critical length and causing the structure to suddenly fail under normal loading conditions.
- The third type of failure is caused by manufacturing errors, including improper selection of materials, incorrect sizing, improper heat treating, failing to adhere to the design, or shoddy workmanship. This type of failure can occur at any time and is usually unpredictable.
- The fourth type of failure is from the use of defective materials. This type of failure is also unpredictable, since the material may have been improperly manufactured or damaged from prior use.
- The fifth cause of failure is from lack of consideration of unexpected problems. This type of failure can be caused by events such as vandalism, sabotage, or natural disasters. It can also occur if those who use and maintain the construction are not properly trained and overstress the structure.

== Notable failures ==
=== Bridges ===
==== Dee bridge ====
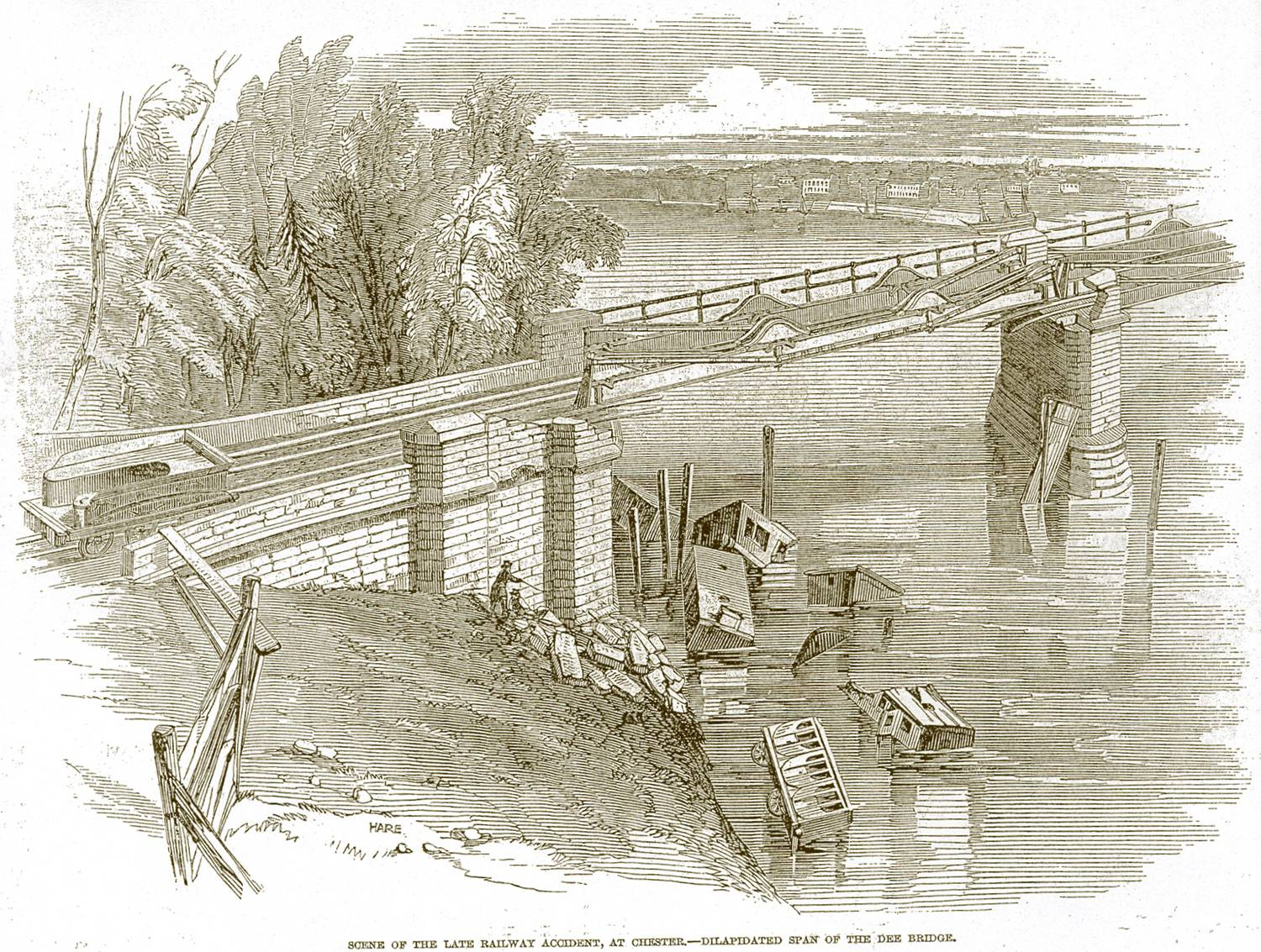
The Dee Bridge after its collapse

The Dee Bridge in Chester, England, was designed by Robert Stephenson, using girders of cast iron reinforced with struts of wrought iron. On 24 May 1847, it collapsed as a train passed over it, killing five people. Its collapse was the subject of one of the first formal inquiries into a structural failure. This inquiry concluded that the design of the structure was fundamentally flawed, as the wrought iron did not reinforce the cast iron, and that the casting had failed due to repeated flexing.

==== First Tay Bridge ====
The First Tay bridge disaster was followed by a number of cast iron bridge collapses, including the collapse of the first Tay Bridge across the Firth of Tay in Scotland on 28 December 1879. Like the Dee Bridge, the Tay collapsed when a train passed over it, killing 75 people. The bridge failed because it was constructed from poorly made cast iron, and because the engineer Thomas Bouch failed to consider wind loading on it. Its collapse resulted in cast iron being replaced by steel construction, and a complete redesign in 1890 of the Forth Bridge, which became the first bridge in the world made entirely of steel.

==== First Tacoma Narrows Bridge ====
The 1940 collapse of the original Tacoma Narrows Bridge in Washington, United States, is sometimes characterized in physics textbooks as a classic example of resonance, although this description is misleading. The catastrophic vibrations that destroyed the bridge were not due to simple mechanical resonance, but to a more complicated oscillation between the bridge and winds passing through it, known as aeroelastic flutter. Robert H. Scanlan, a leading contributor to the understanding of bridge aerodynamics, wrote an article about this misunderstanding. This collapse, and the research that followed, led to an increased understanding of wind/structure interactions. Several bridges were altered following the collapse to prevent a similar event occurring again. The only fatality was a dog.

==== I-35W Bridge ====
Security camera images show the I-35W collapse in animation, looking north.

The I-35W Mississippi River bridge (officially known simply as Bridge 9340) was an eight-lane steel truss arch bridge that carried Interstate 35W across the Mississippi River in Minneapolis, Minnesota, United States. The bridge was completed in 1967, and its maintenance was performed by the Minnesota Department of Transportation. The bridge was Minnesota's fifth–busiest, carrying 140,000 vehicles daily. The bridge catastrophically failed during the evening rush hour on 1 August 2007, collapsing to the river and riverbanks beneath. Thirteen people were killed and 145 were injured. Following the collapse, the Federal Highway Administration advised states to inspect the 700 U.S. bridges of similar construction after a possible design flaw in the bridge was discovered, related to large steel sheets called gusset plates which were used to connect girders together in the truss structure. Officials expressed concern about many other bridges in the United States sharing the same design and raised questions as to why such a flaw would not have been discovered in over 40 years of inspections.

=== Buildings ===
==== Thane building collapse ====
On 4 April 2013, a building collapsed on tribal land in Mumbra, a suburb of Thane in Maharashtra, India. It has been called the worst building collapse in the area; (Note: It has also been called the worst building collapse disaster in the past 10 years within the state of Maharashtra, and the worst in the country in 20 years.) 74 people died, including 18 children, 23 women, and 33 men, while more than 100 people survived.

The building was under construction and did not have an occupancy certificate for its 100 to 150 low- to middle-income residents; its only occupants were the site construction workers and their families. The building was reported to have been illegally constructed because standard practices were not followed for safe, lawful construction, land acquisition and resident occupancy.

By 11 April, a total of 15 suspects were arrested including builders, engineers, municipal officials, and other responsible parties. Governmental records indicate that there were two orders to manage the number of illegal buildings in the area: a 2005 Maharashtra state order to use remote sensing and a 2010 Bombay High Court order. Complaints were also made to state and municipal officials.

On 9 April, the Thane Municipal Corporation began a campaign to demolish illegal buildings in the area, focusing on "dangerous" buildings, and set up a call center to accept and track the resolutions of complaints about illegal buildings. The forest department, meanwhile, promised to address encroachment of forest land in the Thane District.

==== Savar building collapse ====
On 24 April 2013, Rana Plaza, an eight-storey commercial building, collapsed in Savar, a sub-district in the Greater Dhaka Area, the capital of Bangladesh. The search for the dead ended on 13 May with the death toll of 1,134. Approximately 2,515 injured people were rescued from the building alive.

It is considered to be the deadliest garment-factory accident in history, as well as the deadliest accidental structural failure in modern human history.

The building contained clothing factories, a bank, apartments, and several other shops. The shops and the bank on the lower floors immediately closed after cracks were discovered in the building. Warnings to avoid using the building after cracks appeared the day before had been ignored. Garment workers were ordered to return the following day and the building collapsed during the morning rush-hour.

==== Sampoong Department Store collapse ====
On 29 June 1995, the five-story Sampoong Department Store in the Seocho District of Seoul, South Korea, collapsed, resulting in the deaths of 502 people, with another 1,445 being trapped.

In April 1995, cracks began to appear in the ceiling of the fifth floor of the store's south wing due to the presence of an air-conditioning unit on the weakened roof of the poorly built structure. On the morning of 29 June, as the number of cracks in the ceiling increased dramatically, store managers closed the top floor and shut off the air conditioning, but failed to shut the building down or issue formal evacuation orders as the executives themselves left the premises as a precaution.

Five hours before the collapse, the first of several loud bangs was heard emanating from the top floors, as the vibration of the air conditioning caused the cracks in the slabs to widen further. Amid customer reports of vibration in the building, the air conditioning was turned off but, the cracks in the floors had already grown to 10 cm wide. At about 5:00 p.m. local time, the fifth-floor ceiling began to sink, and at 5:57 p.m., the roof gave way, sending the air conditioning unit crashing through into the already-overloaded fifth floor.

==== Ronan Point ====
On 16 May 1968, the 22-story residential tower Ronan Point in the London Borough of Newham partially collapsed when a relatively small gas explosion on the 18th floor caused a structural wall panel to be blown away from the building. The tower was constructed of precast concrete, and the failure of the single panel caused one entire corner of the building to collapse. The panel was able to be blown out because there was insufficient reinforcement steel passing between the panels. This also meant that the loads carried by the panel could not be redistributed to other adjacent panels, because there was no route for the forces to follow. As a result of the collapse, building regulations were overhauled to prevent disproportionate collapse and the understanding of precast concrete detailing was greatly advanced. Many similar buildings were altered or demolished as a result of the collapse.

==== Oklahoma City bombing ====
On 19 April 1995, the nine-story concrete framed Alfred P. Murrah Federal Building in Oklahoma City, United States, was struck by a truck bomb causing partial collapse, resulting in the deaths of 168 people. The bomb, though large, caused a significantly disproportionate collapse of the structure. The bomb blew all the glass off the front of the building and completely shattered a ground floor reinforced concrete column (see brisance). At second story level a wider column spacing existed, and loads from upper story columns were transferred into fewer columns below by girders at second floor level. The removal of one of the lower story columns caused neighbouring columns to fail due to the extra load, eventually leading to the complete collapse of the central portion of the building. The bombing was one of the first to highlight the extreme forces that blast loading from terrorism can exert on buildings, and led to increased consideration of terrorism in structural design of buildings.

==== Versailles wedding hall ====
The Versailles wedding hall (Hebrew: אולמי ורסאי), located in the Talpiot neighbourhood of Jerusalem, is the site of the most fevered civil disaster in Israel's history. At 22:43 on Thursday night, 24 May 2001 during the wedding of Keren and Asaf Dror, a large portion of the third floor of the four-story building collapsed, killing 23 people. The bride and the groom survived.

==== World Trade Center Towers 1, 2, and 7 ====
In the September 11 attacks, two commercial airliners were deliberately crashed into the Twin Towers of the World Trade Center in New York City. The impact, explosion and resulting fires caused both towers to collapse within less than two hours. The impacts severed exterior columns and damaged core columns, redistributing the loads that these columns had carried. This redistribution of loads was greatly influenced by the hat trusses at the top of each building. The impacts dislodged some of the fireproofing from the steel, increasing its exposure to the heat of the fires. Temperatures became high enough to weaken the core columns to the point of creep and plastic deformation under the weight of higher floors. The heat of the fires also weakened the perimeter columns and floors, causing the floors to sag and exerting an inward force on exterior walls of the building. 7 World Trade Center also collapsed later that day; the 47-story skyscraper collapsed within seconds due to a combination of a large fire inside the building and heavy structural damage from the collapse of the North Tower.

==== Champlain Towers ====
On 24 June 2021, Champlain Towers South, a 12-story condominium building in Surfside, Florida, United States, partially collapsed, causing dozens of injuries and 98 deaths. The collapse was captured on video. One person was rescued from the rubble, and about 35 people were rescued on 24 June from the uncollapsed portion of the building. Long-term degradation of reinforced concrete-support structures in the underground parking garage, due to water penetration and corrosion of the reinforcing steel, has been considered as a factor in—or the cause of—the collapse. The issues had been reported in 2018 and noted as "much worse" in April 2021. A US$15 million program of remedial works had been approved at the time of the collapse.

=== Aircraft ===
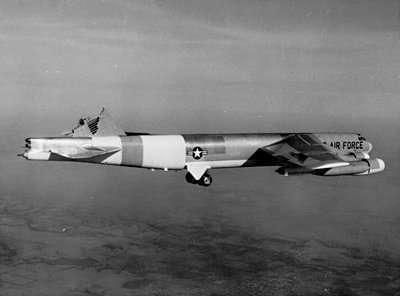
A 1964 B-52 Stratofortress test demonstrated the same failure that caused the 1963 Elephant Mountain & 1964 Savage Mountain crashes.

Repeat structural failures on the same type of aircraft occurred in 1954, when two de Havilland Comet C1 jet airliners crashed due to decompression caused by metal fatigue, and in 1963–64, when the vertical stabilizer on four Boeing B-52 bombers broke off in mid-air.

=== Other ===
==== Warsaw Radio Mast ====
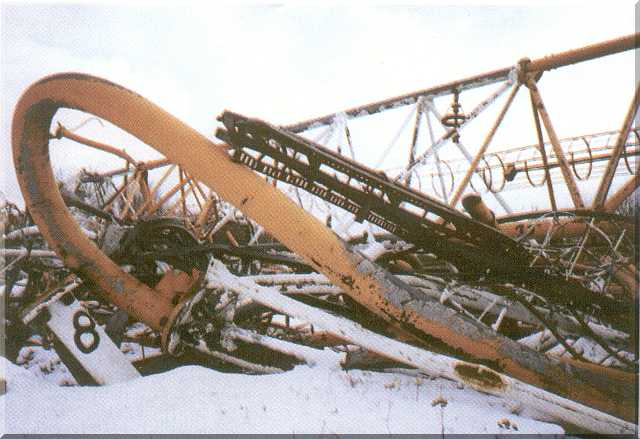
The Warsaw radio mast after collapse

On 8 August 1991, at 16:00 UTC, the Warsaw radio mast near Gąbin, Poland, the tallest man-made object ever built before the erection of Burj Khalifa, collapsed as a consequence of an error in exchanging the guy-wires on the highest stock. The mast first bent and then snapped at roughly half its height. It destroyed at its collapse a small mobile crane of Mostostal Zabrze. As all workers had left the mast before the exchange procedures, there were no fatalities, in contrast to the similar collapse of the WLBT Tower in 1997.

==== Hyatt Regency walkway ====
Design change on the Hyatt Regency walkways

On 17 July 1981, two suspended walkways through the lobby of the Hyatt Regency in Kansas City, Missouri, United States, collapsed, killing 114 and injuring more than 200 people at a tea dance. The collapse was due to a late change in design, altering the method in which the rods supporting the walkways were connected to them, and inadvertently doubling the forces on the connection. The failure highlighted the need for good communication between design engineers and contractors, and rigorous checks on designs and especially on contractor-proposed design changes. The failure is a standard case study on engineering courses around the world, and is used to teach the importance of ethics in engineering.

== See also ==
- Structural analysis
- Structural robustness
- Catastrophic failure
- Earthquake engineering
- Porch collapse
- Forensic engineering
- Progressive collapse
- Seismic performance
- Serviceability failure
- Structural fracture mechanics
- Collapse zone
- Engineering disasters
- Tofu-dreg project
- Urban search and rescue
- List of structural failures and collapses
