= 1954 Aldbury Valetta accident =

British Royal Air Force training accident

Coordinates: 51°47′49.36″N 0°35′39.76″W

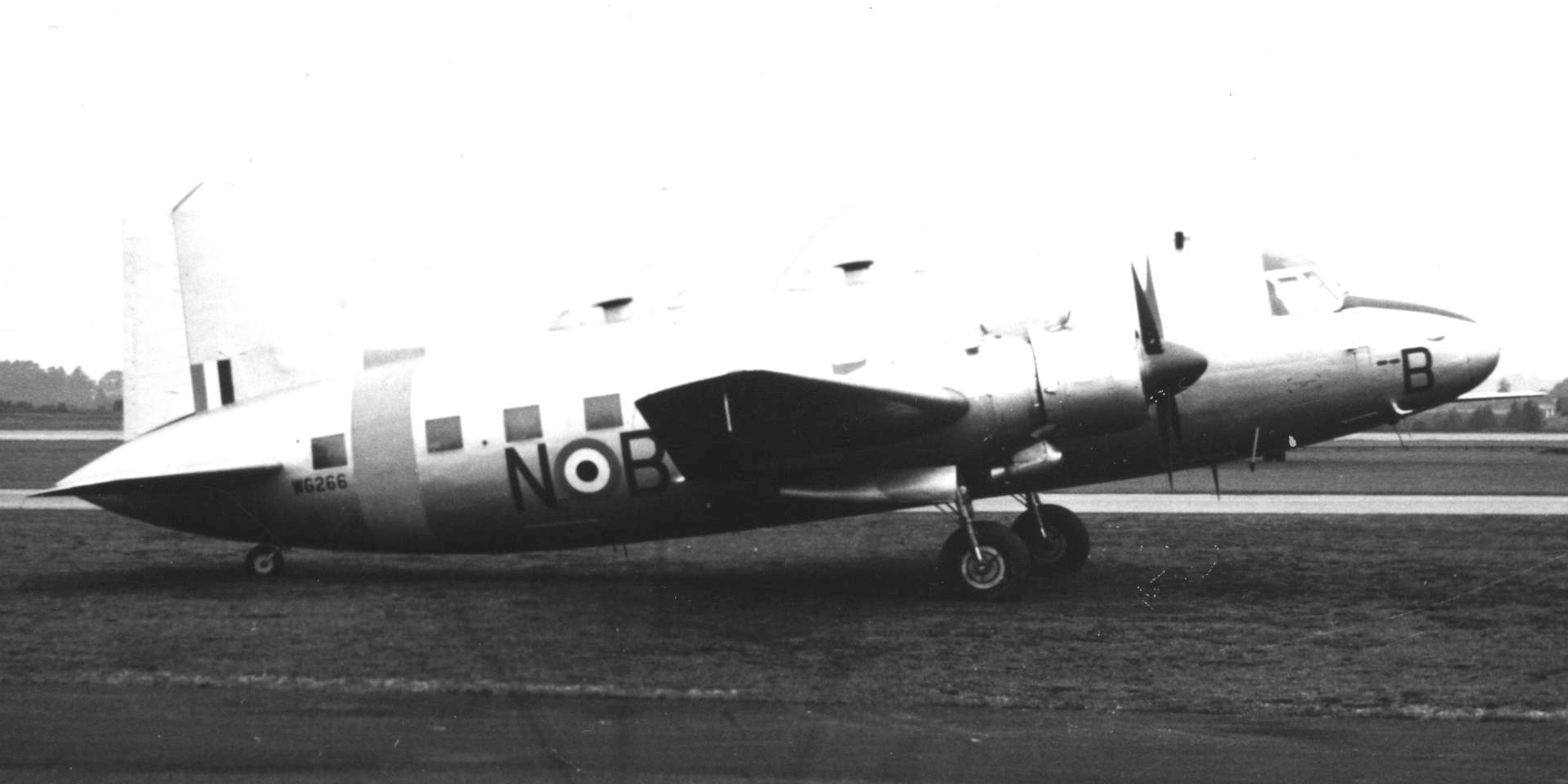
- A Valetta T3 similar to WJ474

Accident
- Date: 6 January 1954
- Site: Aldbury, Hertfordshire, England, United Kingdom

Aircraft
- Aircraft type: Vickers Valetta T3
- Operator: Royal Air Force
- Registration: WJ474
- Flight origin: RAF Bovingdon, England
- Destination: RAF Thorney Island, England
- Passengers: 13
- Crew: 4
- Fatalities: 16
- Survivors: 1

On 6 January 1954 WJ474 a twin-engined Vickers Valetta training aircraft of No. 2 Air Navigation School Royal Air Force crashed near RAF Bovingdon just after takeoff in bad weather.

== Accident ==
The Valetta was authorised to carry out a pilot and navigation exercise from RAF Thorney Island to RAF Bovingdon and return. The flight was also to be used to transport a rugby team for a match at RAF Halton.

The aircraft had completed the first leg from Thorney Island to Bovingdon with 16 passengers without incident. For the return flight an extra passenger was carried although the aircraft had only 16 passenger seats. The pilot had not played in the rugby match but the other crew members had. The Valetta took off at 17:16 with a visibility of 1200 yards in snow. The Valetta was seen to climb to about 400 feet then during a turn to the left it hit a tree five miles north of the airfield and crashed near Tom's Hill, Aldbury, on part of the Ashridge Park estate of the National Trust. The aircraft crashed onto a wooded slope when both engines were torn off. The fuselage continued for another 100 yards with a debris trail of wreckage and bodies.

== Rescue and aftermath ==
The wreckage was spread over two miles, with a cold north wind and ice and snow on the ground combined with a narrow access road made rescue difficult. The fire brigade station officer said it had taken them half an hour to find the wreckage. The National Trust chief ranger with four of his staff were first on the scene reported "Ten bodies were scattered about and we found two men alive. One was outside the aircraft and did not seem to be very badly hurt. The other was pulled from inside the smashed fuselage and was only semi-conscious." Two passengers were rescued but one died in hospital later; all the others on board were killed. The location was close to the same spot a Boeing B-17 Flying Fortress had crashed during World War II.

== Investigation ==
The cause of the accident was not established, but the extra passenger and weather at takeoff did not contribute to the crash. It was assumed that the pilot was trying to keep in eye contact with the ground in the poor visibility. Verdicts of accidental death were returned for the sixteen victims at the coroner's inquest held at Berkhamsted. The sole survivor,Wg Cdr Patrick Cliff,said at the inquest he could not remember anything after boarding the aircraft at Bovingdon. The coroner said that before the aircraft departed "certain things were not done which should have been done. But the question of taking off was entirely a matter for the pilot to decide." "For some reason height was lost – no one knows why, no one will ever know. That caused the unfortunate crash. There was nothing wrong with the engines."

== See also ==
- List of aviation accidents and incidents with a sole survivor
