= 1953 Mediterranean Sea mid-air collision =

Accident
- Date: 15 January 1953
- Summary: Mid-air collision
- Site: over the Strait of Sicily
- Total fatalities: 26
- Total survivors: 0

First aircraft
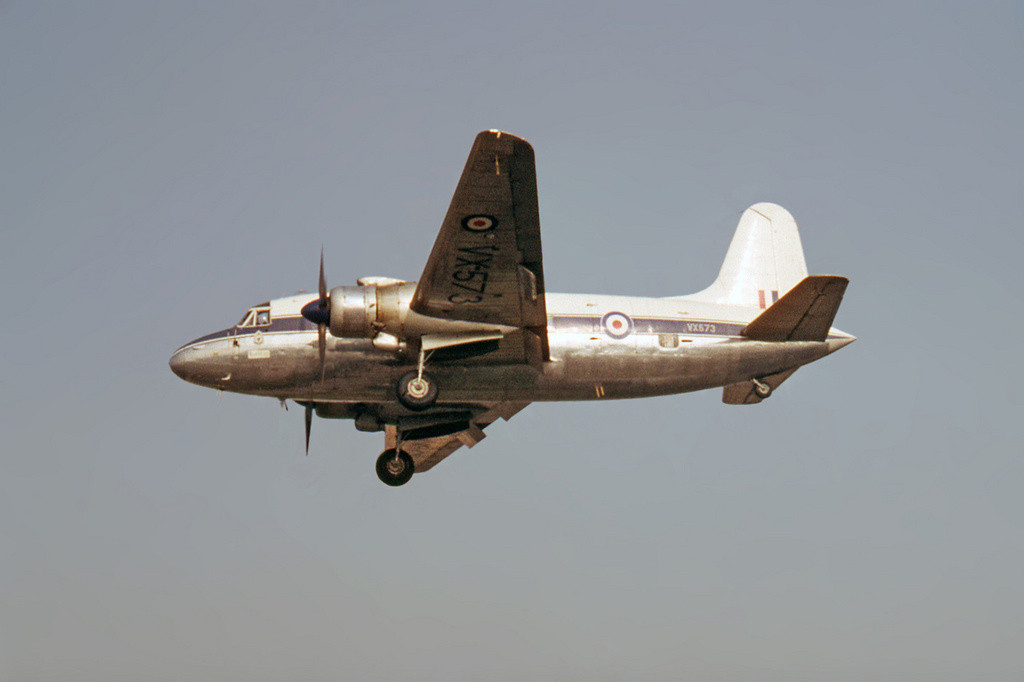
- A Vickers Valetta similar to the accident aircraft
- Type: Vickers Valetta C1
- Operator: Royal Air Force
- Registration: VX562
- Flight origin: RAF Luqa
- Passengers: 16
- Crew: 3
- Fatalities: 19
- Survivors: 0

Second aircraft
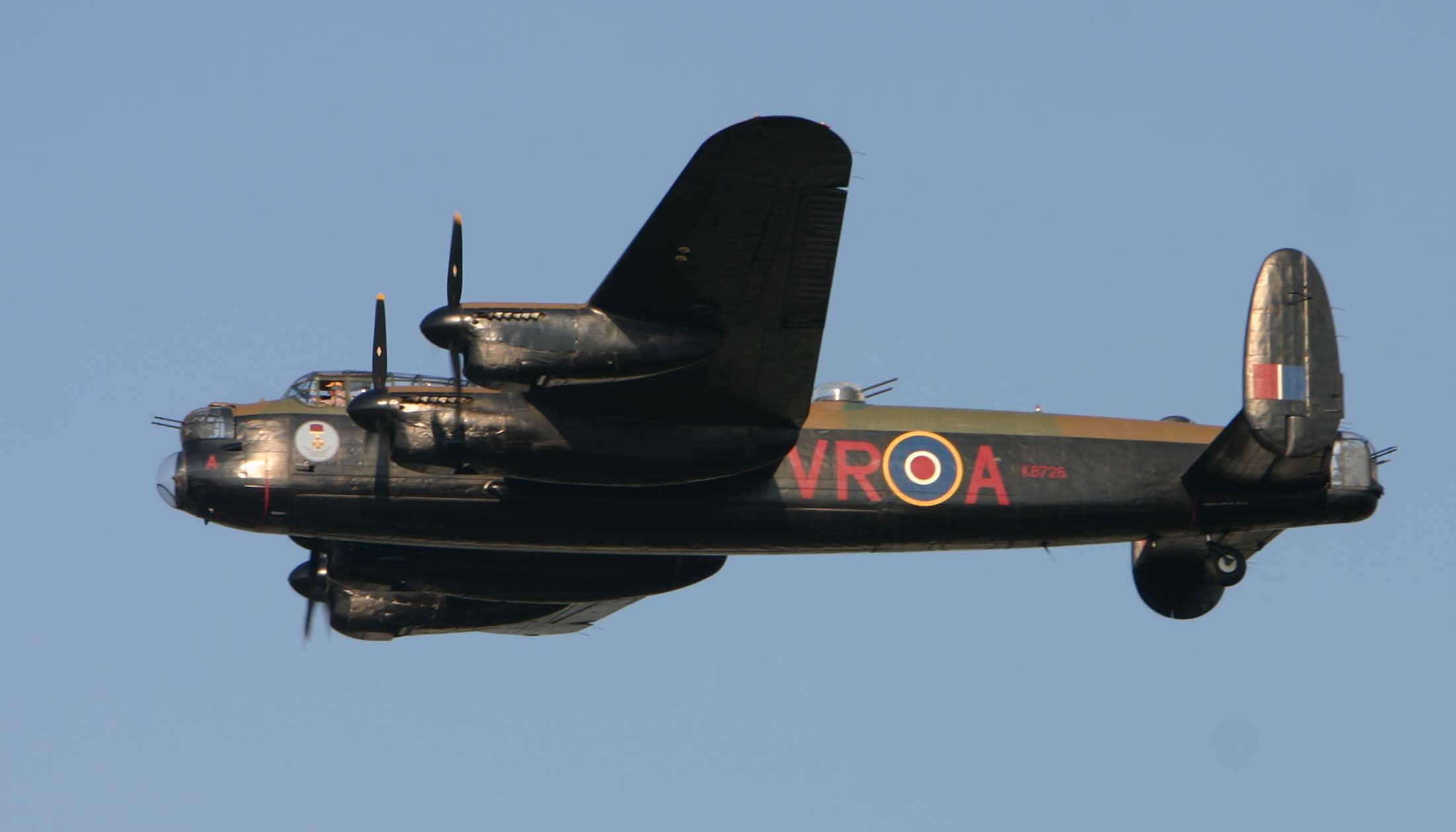
- An Avro Lancaster similar to the accident aircraft
- Type: Avro Lancaster GR3
- Operator: Royal Air Force
- Registration: TX270
- Crew: 7
- Fatalities: 7
- Survivors: 0

On 15 January 1953, a twin-engined Vickers Valetta transport aircraft of the Royal Air Force (RAF), serial number VX562, collided over the Mediterranean Sea with a four-engined RAF Avro Lancaster maritime patrol aircraft. All 26 people on board both aircraft were killed.

== Accident ==
The Valetta had departed RAF Luqa with 16 passengers (15 airmen and one Royal Navy (RN) sailor) on a return flight to the United Kingdom. Just before 05:00, the Valetta was between Pantelleria and Sicily when it collided with the Lancaster in poor visibility and heavy rain.

The Lancaster from No. 38 Squadron RAF was following HMS Gambia and other RN ships on an anti-submarine exercise. The seven crew on the Lancaster and all on board the Valetta were killed.

== Rescue and aftermath ==
HMS Gambia and other ships were used to search the scene for survivors, but only wreckage was found. Later the destroyer HMS Chieftain was dispatched to search east of Pantelleria after a note case belonging to one of the Lancaster crew was found, without success. The only body recovered was that of Sgt Victor Ronald Chandler RAF (age 32) who was buried in Imtarfa Military Cemetery in Malta.

== Investigation ==
The court of inquiry decided that the weather conditions at the time were a factor with localized thunderstorms, heavy rain and hail and no blame could be attached to any individual. Evidence did reveal that although the Malta Flight Information Centre was not in possession of full information on the Lancaster's sortie, it was not a contributory cause.
