= Collapse zone =

Area around a structure that may suffer structural collapse

A collapse zone is the dangerous area around a structure (usually a burning structure) that is in danger of structural collapse. A collapse zone affects firefighters working on the exterior of a structure.

== Signs of structural failure ==
The first indicator of possible structural failure is the type of wall. The material of the wall may provide clues, as well as the structural significance. A free-standing wall has a higher collapse risk than a non-bearing wall.

Other indicators include:

- smoke from mortar joints
- bowing walls
- other areas of structural failure

After an interior collapse, the risk of an exterior collapse, and therefore the need for a collapse zone, rises significantly.

== Structural failure ==
A wall may collapse in three general manners.

=== 90° angle collapse ===
This is the most common type of structural collapse. It is similar to a falling tree. The wall falls straight out and the top hits the ground at a distance equal to the height of the wall.

=== Curtain-fall collapse ===
This type of collapse generally occurs with a masonry wall. It collapses like a curtain dropping from the top, creating a pile of debris at the base of the wall.

=== Inward/outward collapse ===
A wall leaning inward may not necessarily fall inward. The lower or upper portion may slide or "kick" outward.

== Establishing a collapse zone ==
Collapse zones are traditionally established by a commanding officer. The collapse zone itself should be as wide as the structure and as tall, plus half the height. The reason for this increase in height is that the worst-case scenario (and the most common), a 90° Angle Collapse, must be assumed. A collapse zone should be established with barricade tape and should be enforced if necessary.

== Obstacles ==
A collapse zone can easily limit the access of hose lines. Hose lines should operate outside the zone, on the sides. A secured (and unattended) deluge nozzle can also be put into operation, with caution. An aerial fire apparatus may be required. In this case, the collapse zone should be considered a three-dimensional arc, and aerial ladders may not operate in that arc.
