= 1957 Aqaba Valetta accident =

Aviation accident in Jordan

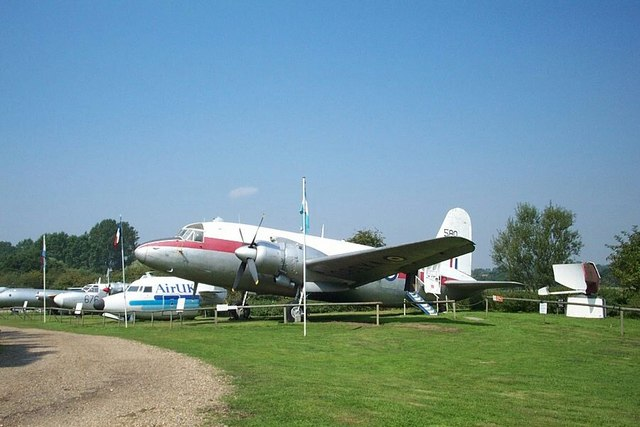
- A Vickers Valetta C.2 similar to the accident aircraft

Accident
- Date: 17 April 1957
- Summary: Structural failure in clear-air turbulence
- Site: 20 miles from Aqaba Airport, Jordan; 29.8°N 35.31667°E

Aircraft
- Aircraft type: Vickers Valetta C.1
- Operator: Royal Air Force
- Registration: VW832
- Flight origin: Aqaba Airport, Jordan
- Destination: RAF Habbaniya, Iraq
- Occupants: 27
- Passengers: 24
- Crew: 3
- Fatalities: 27
- Survivors: 0

On 17 April 1957, a Vickers Valetta C.1 transport aircraft, serial number VW832, of 84 Squadron, Royal Air Force crashed and was destroyed after departing from Aqaba Airport in Jordan following wing failure due to turbulence. The crash is the deadliest air disaster in the history of Jordan.

== Accident ==
The Valetta was returning British Army troops from Jordan to the United Kingdom following the end of the Anglo-Jordanian Treaty. The Valetta had three crew and most of the 24 passengers were from the 10th Royal Hussars. The aircraft departed Aqaba at 10:23, bound for a stop at Mafraq Airport in North Jordan and then RAF Habbaniya in Iraq. At about 10:30 the aircraft hit turbulence causing the wing to fail, the aircraft spun into the ground 20 miles North North West of Aqaba, it burned and was destroyed killing all on board.

The bodies were returned to RAF Habbaniya and were buried with full military honours in the RAF/CWGC cemetery on 27 April 1957. The bodies lie in Plot 5 Row B Graves 1–7. The personnel who died were 3 RAF crew, 18 10th Hussars troops, 5 REME soldiers and 1 Army Catering Corps soldier.

== Investigation ==
The Board of Inquiry found the accident was due to the failure of the port main spar of the outer wing which had resulted in the disintegration of the wing round the fracture and damage to the rear fuselage and tail. The board also said it found that spar failure was due to over-stressing and they suggested this was due to the extreme air turbulence which was known to have existed in the area at the time. The board said they had found no sign of a fatigue failure.
