= 1963 Elephant Mountain B-52 crash =

Aviation accident in Maine, United States

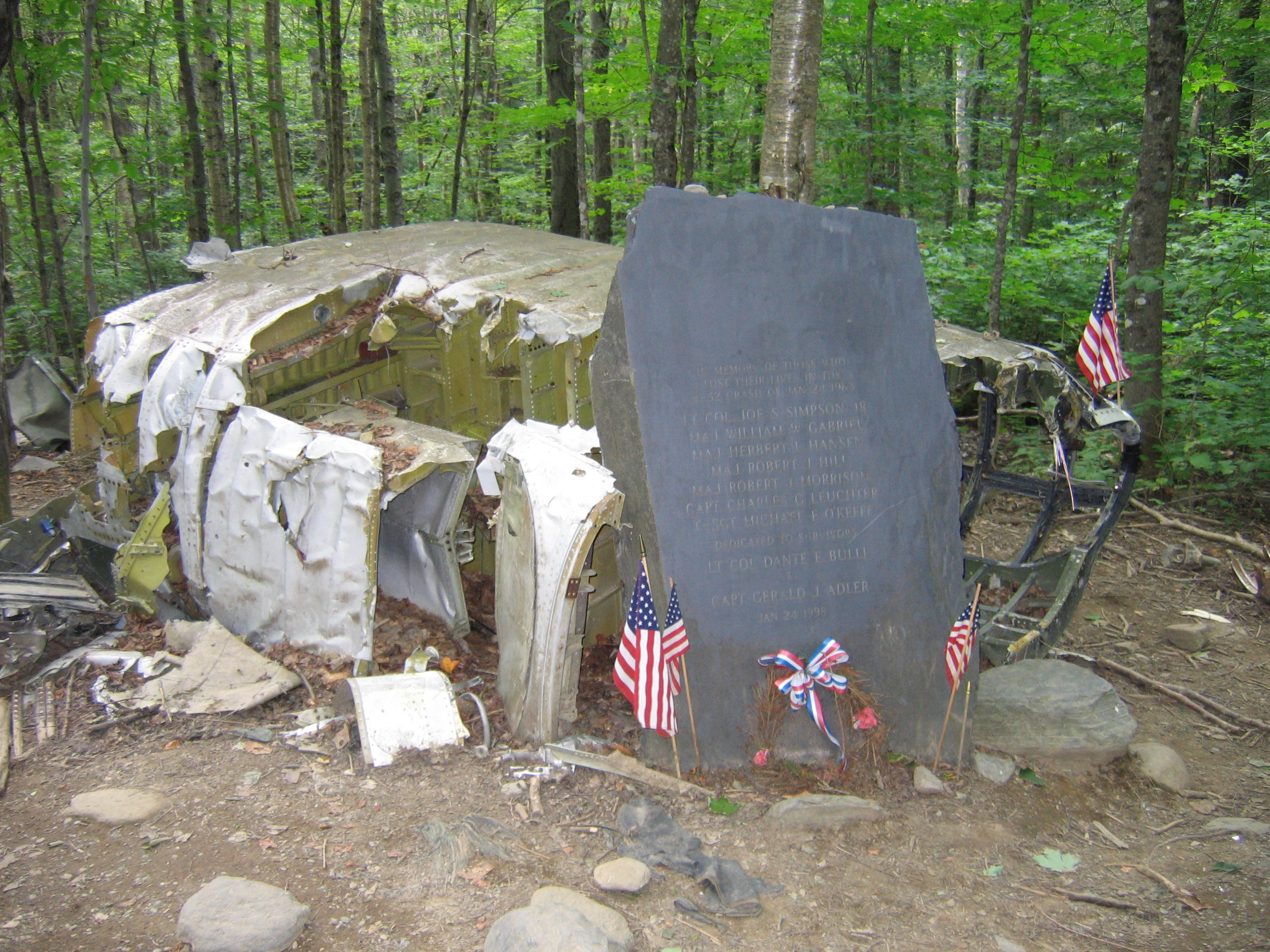
- Memorial and wreckage of B-52 on Elephant Mountain

Accident
- Date: 24 January 1963
- Summary: Structural failure
- Site: Elephant Mountain, Maine, United States; 45°31′40″N 69°26′5″W

Aircraft
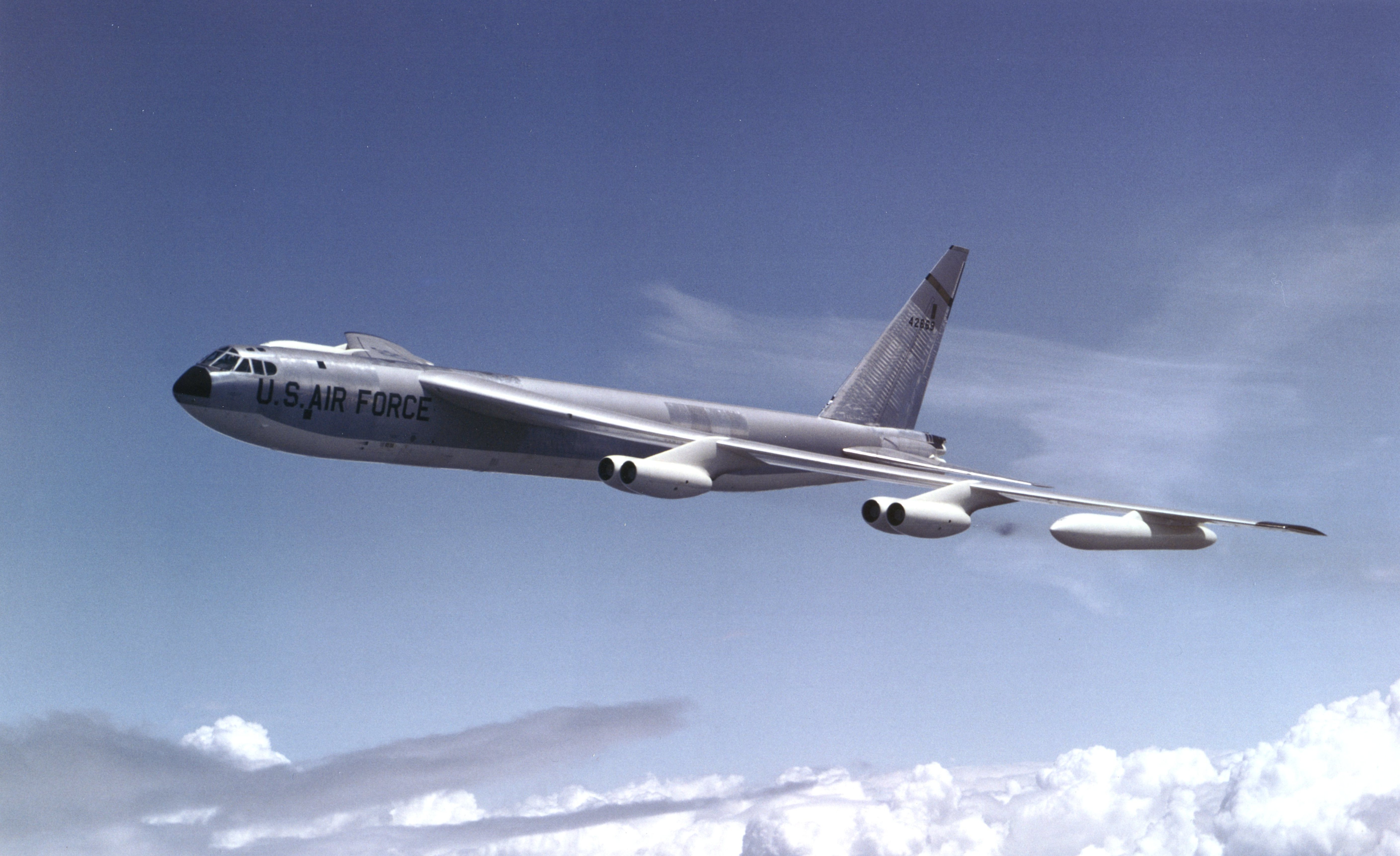
- A Boeing B-52 Stratofortress similar to the aircraft involved
- Aircraft type: B-52C Stratofortress
- Operator: Strategic Air Command, United States Air Force
- Registration: 53‑0406
- Flight origin: Westover AFB near Springfield, Massachusetts
- Passengers: 3
- Crew: 6
- Fatalities: 7
- Injuries: 2
- Survivors: 2

On 24 January 1963 a United States Air Force Boeing B-52C Stratofortress with nine crew members on board lost its vertical stabilizer due to buffeting stresses during turbulence at low altitude and crashed on Elephant Mountain in Piscataquis County, Maine, United States, six miles (9.7 km) from Greenville. The pilot and the navigator survived the accident.

== Training mission ==
The crew's training mission was called a Terrain Avoidance Flight to practice techniques to penetrate Advanced Capability Radar (ACR) undetected by Soviet air defense during the Cold War. ACR training flights had already been made over the West Coast of the United States on Poker Deck routes. This was to be the first low-level navigation flight, utilizing terrain-following radar, in the Eastern United States.

The crew, consisting of two 99th Bombardment Wing Standardization Division crews based at Westover Air Force Base, Massachusetts, and two instructors from the 39th Bombardment Squadron, 6th Strategic Aerospace Wing at Walker Air Force Base, New Mexico, was briefed for six hours the day before the accident. They had the choice of flying over either the Carolinas or Maine.

The B-52C departed Westover AFB at 12:11 p.m. on Thursday, 24 January 1963, and was scheduled to return to Westover at 5:30 p.m.

The crew spent the first 95 minutes of the flight calibrating their equipment. Upon receiving updated weather information for both available routes, they chose the northern one. They were supposed to begin their low-level simulated penetration of enemy airspace just south of Princeton, Maine, near West Grand Lake. From there, they would head north to Millinocket and fly over the mountains in the Jo-Mary/Greenville area. They planned to turn northeast near Seboomook Lake and southeast near Caucomgomoc Lake to proceed through the mountains of northern Baxter State Park. After crossing Traveler Mountain, the aircraft was supposed to climb back to altitude over the Houlton VOR Station.

== Accident ==
Maine, USA

One hour later, around 2:30 p.m. the Stratofortress crossed the Princeton VOR, descended to 500 feet (150 m) and started its simulation of penetrating enemy airspace at low altitude with an airspeed of 280 knots (520 km/h; 320 mph). The outside temperature was −14 °F (−26 °C) with winds gusting to 40 knots (74 km/h; 46 mph) and 5 feet (1.5 m) of snow on the ground.

Approximately 22 minutes later, just after passing Brownville Junction in the center of Maine, the aircraft encountered turbulence. When the pilot and crew commander, Westover's Most Senior Standardization Instructor Pilot, started to climb above it, the vertical stabilizer came off the plane with a "loud noise sounding like an explosion". Having suffered severe damage, the B-52C went into a 40-degree right turn, with nose pointed downward. The pilot gave the order to abandon the aircraft when he could not level it.

Only the upper flight deck crew members of the B-52C have ejection seats that eject them upwards. The seats of the pilot, copilot, and electronic warfare officer (a navigator also trained in electronic warfare) function at any altitude, as long as the airspeed is at least 90 knots (170 km/h; 100 mph), which is the minimum required to inflate their blast propelled parachutes. The lower-deck crew members eject on a downward track. Hence, the navigator and radar navigator cannot safely eject at altitudes less than 200 feet (61 m). Spare crew members do not have an ejection seat at all. They must use parachutes and either jump out of the navigators' hatch after the navigators have ejected or drop out of the aircraft's door. The tail gunner has his own unique escape option: he can sever the tail gun and jump aft out the resulting hole in the rear.

The navigator, who was operating as electronic warfare officer, ejected first. He was followed by the pilot and the copilot; there was neither enough altitude nor time for the six lower-deck crew members to escape before the aircraft crashed into the west side of Elephant Mountain at 2:52 p.m.

The copilot suffered fatal injuries, striking a tree 1 mile (1.6 km) away from the main crash site. The pilot landed in a tree 30 feet (9.1 m) above the ground. He survived the night, with temperatures reaching almost −30 °F (−34 °C), in his survival-kit sleeping bag atop his life raft. The navigator's parachute did not deploy upon ejection. He impacted the snow-covered ground before separating from his ejection seat about 2,000 feet (610 m) from the wreckage with an impact estimated at 16 times the force of gravity. He suffered a fractured skull and three broken ribs. The force bent his ejection seat and he could not get his survival kit out. He survived the night by wrapping himself in his parachute.

A grader operator on a remote woods road witnessed the final turn of the Stratofortress and saw a black smoke cloud after impact. Eighty rescuers from the Maine State Police, the Maine Inland Fish and Game Department, the Civil Air Patrol, as well as Air Force units from Dow Air Force Base in Bangor, Maine, along with others from New Hampshire and Massachusetts and other volunteers, went to work. Search aircraft were on the scene, but they searched too far south and east to locate the wreckage before nightfall.

After the crash site was located the next day, Scott Paper Company dispatched plows from Greenville to clear 10 miles (16 km) of road of snow drifts up to 15 feet (4.6 m) deep. The rescuers had to use snowshoes, dog sleds and snowmobiles to cover the remaining mile to the crash site. At 11 a.m. the two survivors were airlifted to a hospital by a helicopter.

== Accident investigation ==
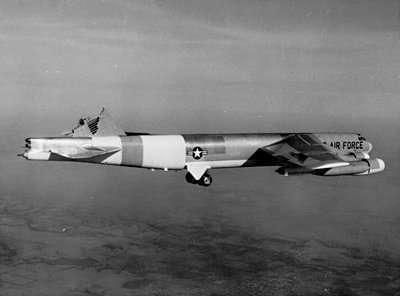
B-52H (61-023), configured at the time as a testbed to investigate structural failures, still flying after its vertical stabilizer sheared off in severe turbulence on 10 January 1964. The aircraft eventually landed safely and remained in service until 2008.

The crash was caused by turbulence-induced structural failure. Due to buffeting stresses, the stabilizer shaft broke and the B-52's vertical stabilizer came off the plane. It was found 1.5 miles (2.4 km) from where the plane struck the mountain side. With the loss of the vertical stabilizer, the aircraft had lost its directional stability and rolled uncontrollably.

Originally, the B-52 was designed to penetrate Soviet airspace at high altitude around 35,000 feet (11 km) and high speed around 450 knots (830 km/h; 520 mph) to drop nuclear weapons. When the US intelligence realized that the Soviets had implemented a sophisticated, layered and interconnected air defense system with radar controlled surface-to-air missiles (SAMs), the US Air Force decided the B-52 would have to penetrate the Soviet airspace at low altitude (around 500 feet or 150 metres) and high speed to stay underneath the radar. However, low altitude, high speed flight operations put enormous stress on an aircraft's structure, especially when flying near mountains, up and down ridges and through valleys due to lee waves. The B-52 was not designed for this kind of operation. 56-0591, a B-52D, took off from Larson AFB, Washington, on 23 June 1959 and experienced a horizontal stabilizer turbulence-induced failure at low level and crashed. The modification process of the B-52 series began in 1961.

B-52C 53-0406, which crashed on Elephant Mountain, was the second high-tailed B-52 to suffer such a fatal structural failure. After extensive testing and another three similar failures (two with fatal crashes) within 12 months of the Elephant Mountain crash, Boeing determined that turbulence would over-stress the B-52's rudder connection bolts, causing first a rudder and subsequently a tail failure. The bolts were strengthened throughout the fleet, fixing the problem.

== Aftermath ==
Of the two survivors, the pilot returned to active duty after spending three months in the hospital and the navigator, whose feet were frostbitten, contracted double pneumonia, became unconscious for five days and his leg had to be amputated because frostbite and gangrene had set in.

Most of the remains of 53–0406 are still at the crash site, owned by Plum Creek Timber Co. They improved the foot trail so visitors can view the wreckage. Although the site has signs posted asking viewers to show due respect while there, it has been vandalized with names carved in the wreckage or marked with permanent marker.

In the late 1970s, a retired military pilot and president of the Moosehead Riders Snowmobile Club initiated the annual memorial snowmobile ride in honor of those aboard the B-52. The annual crash site ceremony is attended by representatives from the Maine Air National Guard, the American Legion, the Civil Air Patrol, Maine Warden Service and members of the snowmobile club. There is a color guard, the laying of a wreath, the reading of the names of those who died, a prayer by a military chaplain and the playing of Taps. One engine and the navigator's ejection seat can be viewed at the Clubhouse.

In 1993, a special commemorative service was sponsored by the Moosehead Riders Snowmobile Club. The navigator attended the event and was honored at several ceremonies. He went to the crash site for the first time since being evacuated thirty years earlier.

In 2011, a Maine Forest Service employee found an ejection seat from the aircraft near an overgrown logging road while hunting. In May 2012 he returned to the site to take photos and record identification numbers to confirm it came from the ill-fated B-52. A recovery team retrieved the mostly intact ejection seat. Researchers claim that it is most likely the pilot's seat and remarkably similar to the seat at the snowmobile clubhouse in Greenville. It is the third seat recovered from the crash and preserved for public viewing. The other is in a Bangor museum.

In 2013, 50 years after the crash, the Snowmobile Club held the annual remembrance at the crash site and the retired pilot gave a rare interview. Navigator Gerald Adler came face-to-face with his rescuer for the first time in 50 years during a Memorial Day event on 25 May 2013.

== See also ==
- 1964 Savage Mountain B-52 crash
- List of aircraft structural failures
