= 1964 Savage Mountain B-52 crash =

Nuclear bomber accident

Savage Mountain B-52 crash
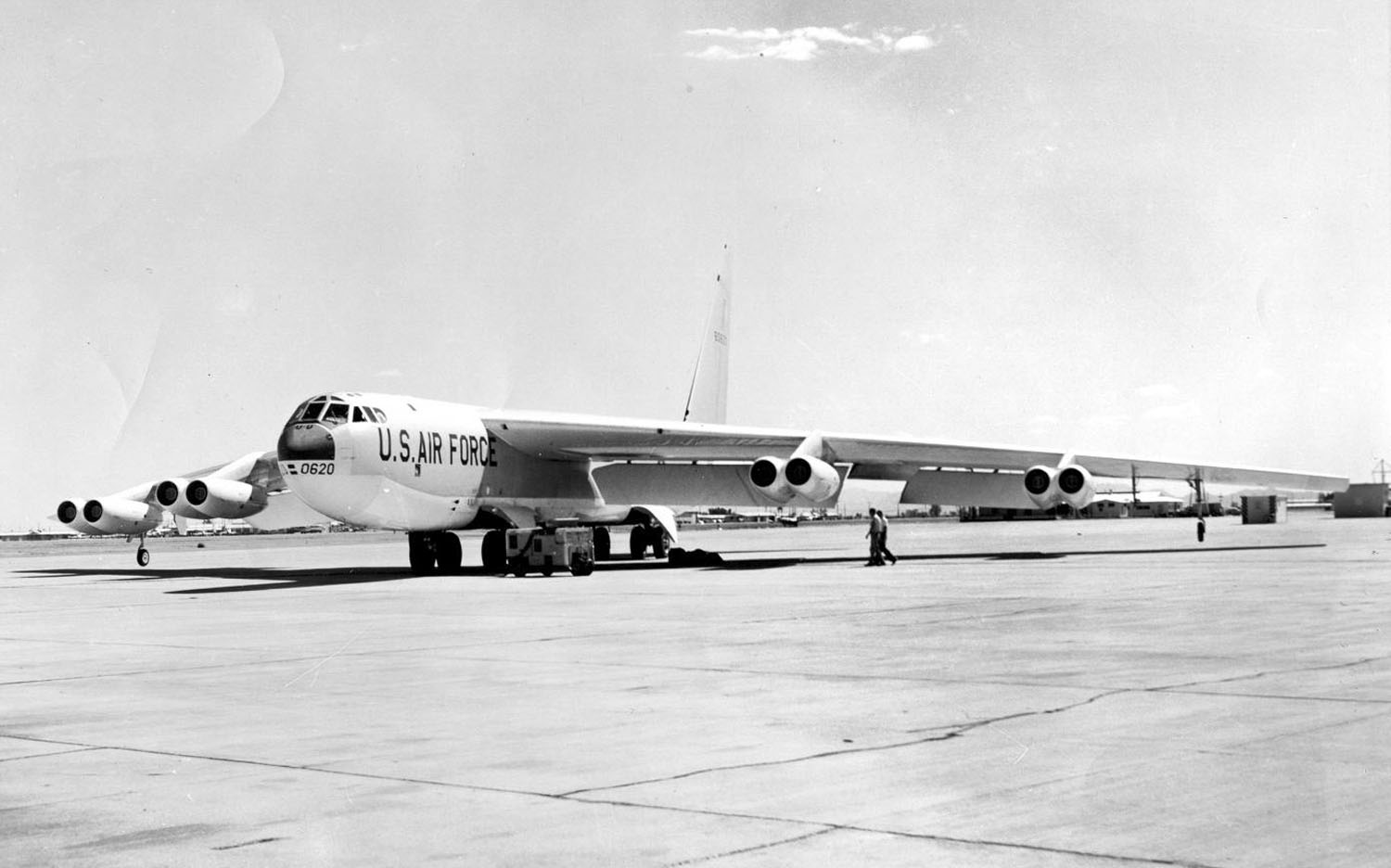
- A Boeing B-52D, similar to the accident aircraft

Accident
- Date: 13 January 1964
- Summary: Structural failure
- Site: Savage Mountain, Garrett County (near Frostburg, Maryland); 39.565278°N 79.075833°W

Aircraft
- Aircraft type: Boeing B-52D Stratofortress
- Operator: 484th Bombardment Wing, Heavy (SAC, United States Air Force)
- Registration: 55-0060 (c/n 464012, call sign "Buzz 14")
- Flight origin: Westover Air Force Base
- Destination: Turner Air Force Base Crash site in Maryland
- Crew: 5: Pilot: Maj Thomas W. McCormick; Co-pilot: Capt Parker C. Peedin; Radar bombardier: Maj Robert J. Townley; Navigator: Maj Robert Lee Payne; Tail gunner: TSgt Melvin F. Wooten
- Fatalities: 3
- Survivors: 2 (Pilot, copilot)

The 1964 Savage Mountain B-52 crash was a U.S. military nuclear accident in which a Cold War bomber's vertical stabilizer broke off in winter storm turbulence. The two nuclear bombs being ferried were found "relatively intact in the middle of the wreckage", according to a later U.S. Department of Defense summary, and after Fort Meade's 28th Ordnance Detachment secured them, the bombs were removed two days later to the Cumberland Municipal Airport. Three of the five crew members died.

== Accident description ==
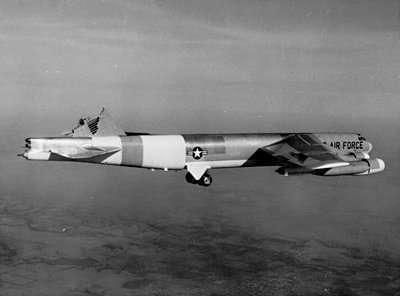
Three days prior the Savage Mountain accident, a similar incident occurred in which a B-52H lost its vertical stabilizer over New Mexico. The crew was able to maintain control and landed safely.

The B-52D was returning to Georgia from Massachusetts after an earlier Chrome Dome airborne alert to Europe. It carried two B53-0 Y1 nuclear bombs in ferry configuration, with no electrical connections between the bombs and the aircraft. Near Meyersdale, Pennsylvania, on a path east of Salisbury, Pennsylvania; and after altitude changes to evade severe turbulence; the vertical stabilizer broke off. The aircraft was left uncontrollable as a result; the pilot ordered the crew to bail out, and the aircraft crashed. The wreckage of the aircraft was found near the Pennsylvania-Maryland border on the Stonewall Green farm. Today, the crash site is in a private meadow of Elbow Mountain within Savage River State Forest, along the public Savage Mountain Trail just north of the Pine Swamp Road crossing.

While the official DOD description of the accident says that the two weapons "were relatively intact in the approximate center of the wreckage area," an account from William L. Stevens, a safety engineer at Sandia National Laboratories, says that "both bombs broke apart on impact." Stevens further said that an Explosive Ordnance Demolition team from the military was planning to remove the bombs quickly "to reduce media coverage", under the protest of Sandia engineers who felt it was unsafe to do so until the state of the bombs was fully known. The U.S. Atomic Energy Commission eventually developed a "carefully considered process" for removing the bomb pieces to an AEC facility.

Later accounts by residents, and at least one local media account from the time, indicate that the bombs were removed from the site using construction equipment supplied from local businesses to the municipal airport.

== Crew ==
As the only crew member who did not eject, the radar bombardier died in the crash and was not located until more than 24 hours afterward. The navigator and tail gunner died of exposure in the snow. The navigator's frozen body was found two days after the accident, 6 miles (10 km) from the crash and 3 miles (5 km) away from where his orange parachute was found high in a tree near Poplar Lick Run. Unable to disentangle his chute he released the Koch fittings and fell over thirty feet (9.1 m) through the tree, suffering injuries from the branches; his survival tent and other gear remained in the tree. He then attempted to find shelter and "meandered", eventually falling down a steep slope in the dark into a river basin. After landing in the "Dye Factory field", the tail gunner trekked in the dark with a broken leg and other injuries over 100 yards (90 m) to the embankment of Casselman River – in which his legs were frozen when his body was found five days later, 800 yards (700 m) from a Salisbury street light.

The pilot parachuted onto Maryland's Meadow Mountain ridge near the Mason–Dixon line and, after being driven to the Tomlinson Inn on the National Road in Grantsville, notified the United States Air Force of the crash. The co-pilot landed near New Germany Road, remained where he landed, and stayed "cozy warm" until rescued.

== See also ==
- 1961 Goldsboro B-52 crash
- 1963 Elephant Mountain B-52 crash
- American Airlines Flight 587
- List of aircraft structural failures
