= Vickers Valetta =

British military transport aircraft, 1947

Valetta
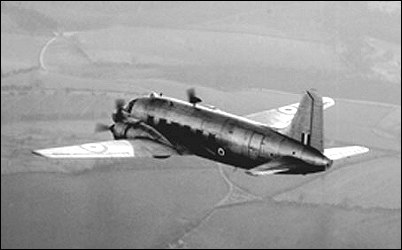

General information
- Type: Military transport aircraft
- Manufacturer: Vickers-Armstrongs Ltd
- Primary user: Royal Air Force
- Number built: 262

History
- First flight: 30 June 1947
- Developed from: Vickers VC.1 Viking
- Variant: Vickers Varsity

The Vickers Valetta is a twin-engine military transport aircraft developed and produced by the British manufacturing company Vickers-Armstrongs Ltd. Developed from the Vickers VC.1 Viking compact civil airliner, it was an all-metal mid-wing monoplane with a tailwheel undercarriage.

Development of the Valetta commenced during immediate postwar years as a consequence of Royal Air Force (RAF) interest in a military transport model of the Viking. Amongst the requirements stipulated for the aircraft was the need for it to rapidly alternate between various different roles, including those of a troop transport, air ambulance, freighter, glider tug, and paratroop carrier. To accommodate these various roles, many of the aircraft's furnishings were designed to be rapidly removed and replaced by alternative configurations. Further design changes from the Viking included the adoption of more powerful Bristol Hercules 230 radial engines, a reinforced cabin floor, and a strengthened undercarriage.

Having performed its maiden flight on 30 June 1947, the Valetta was quickly introduced to RAF service during the following year. The type promptly became a major element of Transport Command's activities and participated in various British military operations conducted during the 1950s and 1960s, including the Suez Crisis, Aden, and the Malayan Emergency. It was further developed into multiple variants, including a VIP model, and multiple training models. Most extensively, the Valetta was the basis for the Vickers Varsity, a dedicated military trainer aircraft.

== Development ==
=== Background ===
The origins of the Valetta are closely associated with the aircraft from which it was derived, the Vickers VC.1 Viking, a civil-orientated airliner which had in turn been derived from the Second World War-era Vickers Wellington medium bomber. During the latter stages of the Viking's development, it underwent extensive evaluations by the Royal Air Force (RAF). Several officials took an interest in seeing the type procured as a dedicated military transport variant with which to equip RAF Transport Command, using the aircraft as a quick replacement for numerous worn-out transport aircraft that had served in the Second World War.

It was on the basis of this interest that the Air Ministry decided to formalise the requirement, issuing Specification C.9/46 with Vickers' design specifically in mind. The aviation author C. F. Andrews observed that the specification was relatively forward-looking for the era, particularly as it required the aircraft to be rapidly convertible for performing various roles, including as a troop carrier, air ambulance, freighter, glider tug, and for air-dropping both paratroopers and supplies.

=== Into flight ===
The first prototype, Valetta, which had originally been built as a standard Viking (c/n 158), was completed during the first half of 1947. On 30 June 1947, this prototype performed the type's maiden flight from Brooklands, piloted by Vickers' test pilot Mutt Summers.

Although the Valetta was named after the Maltese capital Valletta, the aircraft's name is spelt with only a single "l". The Viking and Valetta provided the basis of the Varsity. The Varsity, although similar, was slightly larger and had a tricycle undercarriage arrangement and was equipped with a distinctive under-fuselage pannier for accommodating a bomb-aimer and up to 24 practice bombs.

== Design ==
The Vickers Valetta was a twin-engine military transport aircraft. The fundamental differences between the Valetta and its Viking predecessor consisted of the fitting of more powerful engines, the installation of a strengthened cabin floor, and the presence of a sizable pair of reinforced double-doors on the side of the fuselage for loading and unloading cargoes. The use of more powerful engines was largely necessitated by the aircraft's roughly 2,000 lb increase in all-up weight over that of the Viking. The engines fitted to the Valetta were a pair of Bristol Hercules 230 radial engines, each capable of providing up to 2,000 hp.

To best accommodate its use as a transport aircraft, Valetta was designed to accommodate various-sized military cargoes, even relatively bulky ones; thus the interior floor was designed to support as much as 1,500 lb being exerted upon any single focused point of contact; this floor was lined with anchoring points from which to secure cargoes to. Furthermore, many of the interior furnishings were designed to be quickly-removable, enabling the aircraft to quickly be converted between roles; these furnishings included multiple styles of seating, a loading winch, vehicle ramps, floor rollers, glider-towing apparatus, additional fuel tanks, and side-wall soundproofing measures. As a troop transport, up to 34 fully-equipped soldiers could be carried by a single Valetta, while up to 20 stretcher-bound personnel, along with two medical attendants, could be transported in the air ambulance layout; the paratroop configuration accommodated a maximum of 20 paratroopers along with nine 350 lb air-droppable supply containers.

Several external provisions for handling various payloads were present, such as the carriage of supply containers upon twin racks installed under the centre fuselage. To enable gliders to be towed, the rear fuselage featured a pyramid-shaped structure that was used for the anchoring point and release mechanism alike. For extended range operations, optional flexible bag-like tanks could be installed. To accommodate higher weight payloads that had been anticipated in the Viking's operations and to better withstand rougher landings, the undercarriage was reinforced considerably.

== Operational history ==
During 1948, the Valetta C.1 entered service with the RAF. Its arrival in quantity led to the rapid replacement of the wartime Douglas Dakotas within RAF Transport Command, including the numerous transport squadrons stationed across the Middle East and Far East. The Valetta was used over active conflict zones, such as to perform numerous parachute drops over Egypt during the 1956 Suez Crisis. The type was frequently in its transport capacity to support a number of other British military operations throughout the 1950s and 1960s, including during the Malayan Emergency, and Aden.

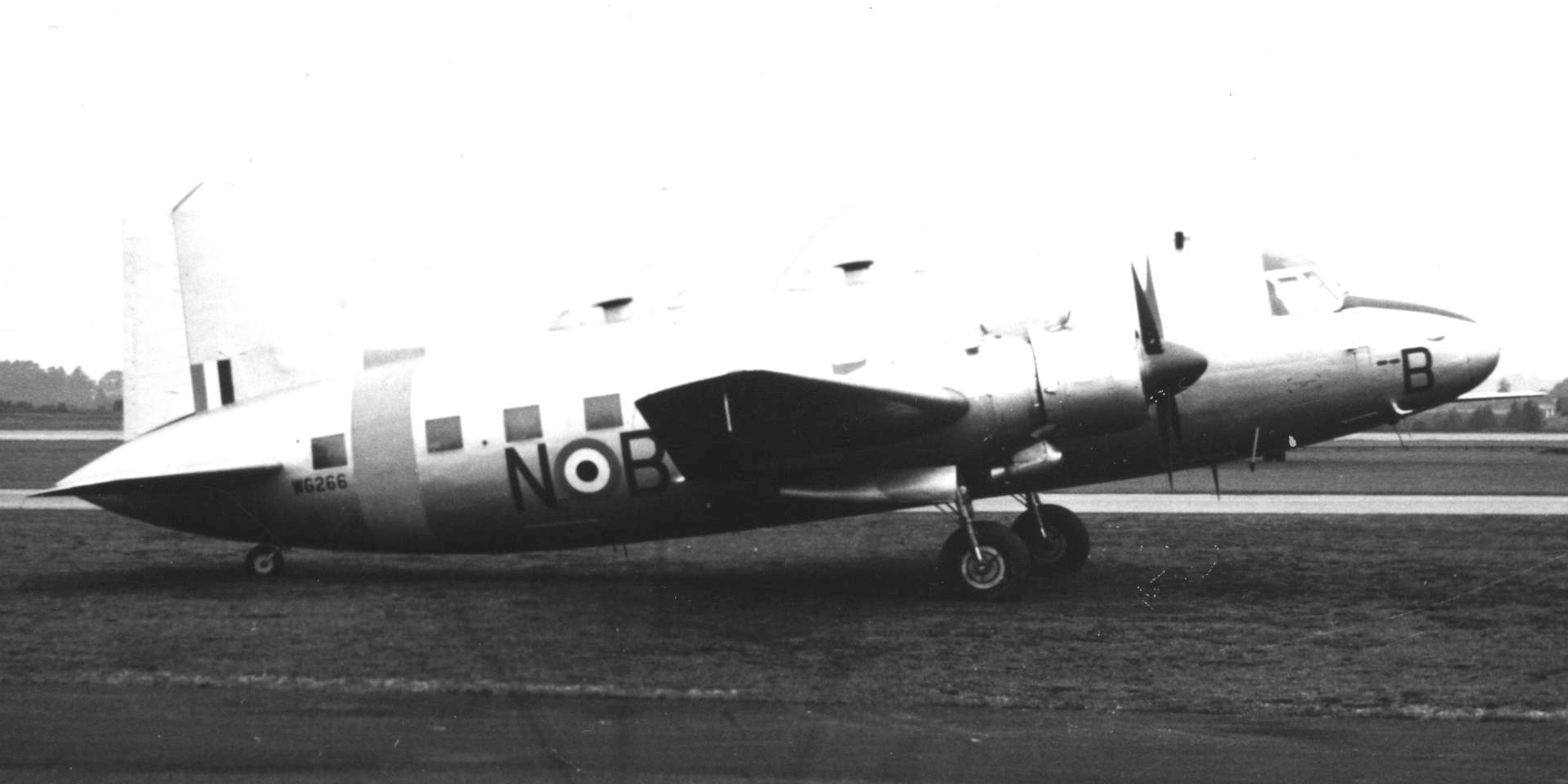
Vickers Valetta T.3 of the RAF College at Blackbushe airport in September 1956. Note the cabin-top astrodomes and aerials for navigational training

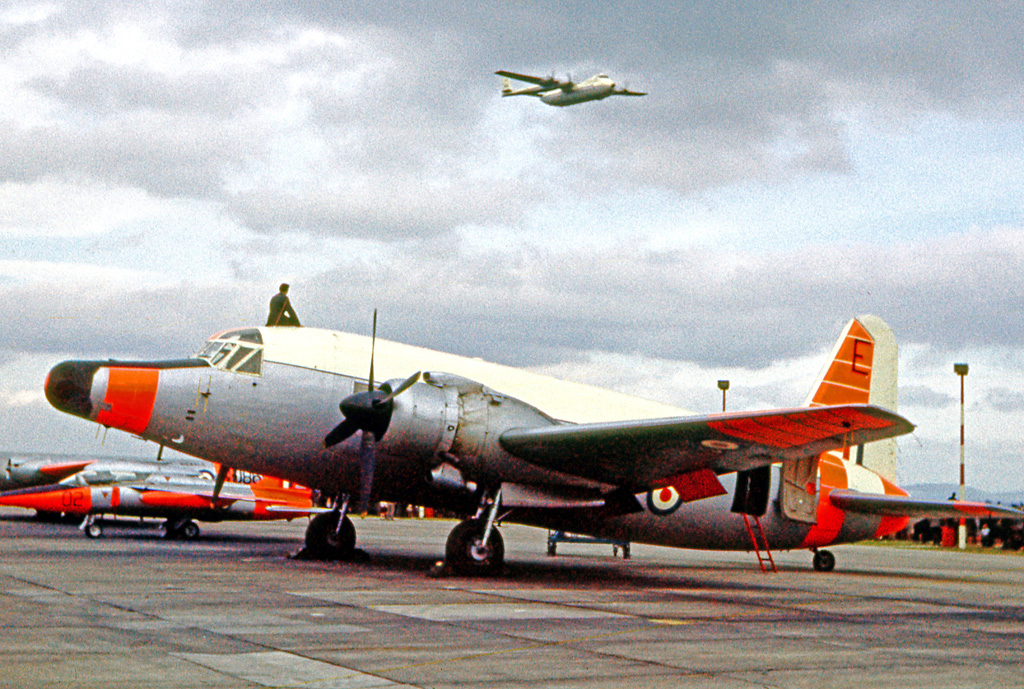
Valetta T.4 of No.2 ANS with extended radar nose

While the vast majority of Valettas were of the C.1 standard, there were several specialised variants inducted as well. The Valetta C.2 was a dedicated VIP passenger transport; its performance was largely similar save for its extended range capabilities.

The Valetta T.3 was built to provide a navigational trainer for service with the RAF College at RAF Cranwell and with No.1 and No.2 Air Navigation Schools. They could be visually distinguished from prior variants by the presence of numerous astrodomes across the top of its fuselage. 40 aircraft were delivered from August 1951, with the last being WJ487 in September 1952. A total of 18 Valetta T.3s were subsequently converted to the T.4 standard, which featured an enlarged nose that accommodated a radar unit, enabling the model to be used for the training of personnel in the aircraft interception (AI) role.

Several individual Valettas were modified under various experimental programmes performed by Vickers. Various alternative undercarriages were trialled, although these reportedly displayed little change in ground handling performance when compared against the standard configuration.

== Variants ==
- Valetta C.1 - transport, 211 built
- Valetta C.2 - VIP transport, 11 built
- Valetta T.3 - aircrew trainer, 40 built.
- Valetta T.4 - converted from T.3 with radar fitted in nose.

== Operators ==
United Kingdom

- Royal Air Force

Squadron	From	To	Location(s)	Notes
No. 30 Squadron RAF	November 1950	May 1957	RAF Abingdon; RAF Benson; RAF Dishforth	
No. 48 Squadron RAF	June 1950 May 1951	September 1950 December 1957	RAF Changi	
No. 52 Squadron RAF	June 1951	April 1966	RAF Changi; RAF Kuala Lumpur; RAF Butterworth	
No. 70 Squadron RAF	January 1950	January 1956	RAF Kabrit; RAF Fayid; RAF Nicosia	
No. 78 Squadron RAF	April 1950	September 1954	RAF Kabrit; RAF Fayid	Disbanded
No. 84 Squadron RAF	February 1953	December 1956	RAF Fayid; RAF Abu Sueir; RAF Nicosia	Disbanded
No. 84 Squadron RAF	December 1956	August 1960	RAF Khormaksar	Reformed
No. 110 Squadron RAF	October 1951	December 1957	RAF Changi	
No. 114 Squadron RAF	September 1949	December 1957	RAF Kabrit; RAF Fayid; RAF Abu Sueir; RAF Nicosia	Disbanded
No. 115 Squadron RAF	August 1963	May 1964	RAF Tangmere; RAF Watton	
No. 204 Squadron RAF	May 1949	February 1953	RAF Kabrit; RAF Fayid	Disbanded
No. 216 Squadron RAF	November 1949	November 1955	RAF Kabrit; RAF Fayid	
No. 233 Squadron RAF	September 1960	January 1964	RAF Khormaksar	Reformed then disbanded
No. 622 Squadron RAF	November 1950	September 1953	RAF Blackbushe	Reformed then disbanded
No. 683 Squadron RAF	November 1950	November 1953	RAF Fayid; RAF Kabrit; RAF Eastleigh; RAF Khormaksar; RAF Habbaniya	
Royal Air Force College Cranwell			RAF Cranwell	
No. 1 Air Navigation School RAF	March 1957	August 1970	RAF Topcliffe; RAF Stradishall	
No. 2 Air Navigation School RAF			RAF Thorney Island	
No. 3 Air Navigation School RAF	March 1952	April 1954	RAF Bishops Court	
No. 5 Air Navigation School RAF	March 1951	November 1952	RAF Lindholme	
No. 6 Air Navigation School RAF	February 1952	December 1953	RAF Lichfield	
No. 228 Operational Conversion Unit RAF	October 1956	1961	RAF North Luffenham; RAF Leeming	
Overseas Ferry Unit RAF			RAF Abingdon	

== Accidents and incidents ==
- On 18 February 1951, an RAF Valetta made a forced belly landing near Stockholm-Bromma Airport following the failure of one engine and radio problems. Airframe icing compounded the situation. Of the 22 passengers and crew, one person was killed. The aircraft was totally destroyed.
- On 15 January 1953, Valetta C.1 VX562 collided in mid-air over the Mediterranean Sea with a RAF Lancaster, all 19 on the Valetta and seven Lancaster crew were killed.
- On 11 November 1953, VX490 disappeared while on air test after departing RAF Changi. All 7 on board died. It is thought the plane broke up in a thunderstorm.
- On 6 January 1954, Valetta T.3 WJ474 crashed near Aldbury, Hertfordshire on takeoff in bad weather from RAF Bovingdon. The aircraft was carrying a rugby team, and 17 on board were killed, with one survivor.
- On 21 February 1954, Valetta C.1 WJ494 Inbound from Hong Kong, crashed 2.4 km (1.5 mi) from Singapore's Changi RAF base during a single engine approach. It was alleged that the pilot feathered the wrong faulty engine whilst approaching the runway. The aircraft lost height and hit trees, bursting into flames; of the twelve occupants, three lost their lives.
- On 17 April 1957, Valetta C.1 VW832 crashed at Queria, Jordan, five minutes after taking off from King Hussein International Airport, when the left wing separated after encountering turbulence. All 26 people on board were killed.
- On 22 August 1957, RAF Valetta VX491 'Y' crashed in the jungle near Tanjong Malim, Malaya. Three RAF crewmen were killed, four 55 Coy RASC AD servicemen survived and were rescued Possible cause - engine failure.

== Aircraft on display ==
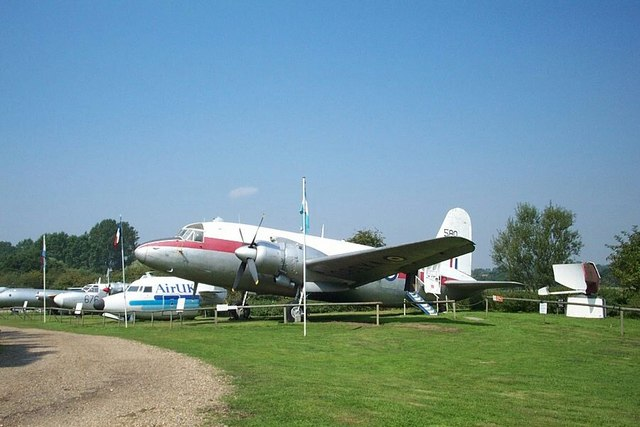
A Valetta C.2 preserved at the Norfolk and Suffolk Aviation Museum

- VX573 – Valetta C.2 on display at Blackbushe Airport in the care of the Blackbushe Heritage Trust after 40 years in storage at the Royal Air Force Museum Cosford in Cosford, Shropshire.
- VX580 – Valetta C.2 on static display at the Norfolk and Suffolk Aviation Museum in Flixton, Suffolk.
- A Valetta T.3 cockpit is displayed at the South Yorkshire Aircraft Museum, Doncaster. While there is no certain identification of the cockpit, it is assumed that it belonged to WJ476.

== Specifications (Vickers Valetta C.1) ==
Data from Vickers Aircraft since 1908

General characteristics

- Crew: 4
- Capacity: 34 troops or 20 paratroops
- Length: 62 ft 11 in (19.18 m)
- Wingspan: 89 ft 3 in (27.20 m)
- Height: 19 ft 7 in (5.97 m) (tail down)
- Wing area: 882 sq ft (81.9 m^{2})
- Empty weight: 24,980 lb (11,331 kg)
- Gross weight: 36,500 lb (16,556 kg)
- Fuel capacity: 724 imp gal (869 US gal; 3,290 L)
- Powerplant: 2 × Bristol Hercules 230 14-cylinder radial piston engine, 2,000 hp (1,500 kW) each
- Propellers: 4-bladed de Havilland (or Rotol) four-bladed constant-speed, 13 ft 3 in (4.04 m) diameter

Performance

- Maximum speed: 258 mph (415 km/h, 224 kn) at 10,000 ft (3,000 m)
- Cruise speed: 172 mph (277 km/h, 149 kn) at 10,000 ft (3,000 m)
- Range: 1,460 mi (2,350 km, 1,270 nmi) at 10,000 ft (3,000 m) and 211 mph (183 kn; 340 km/h)
- Service ceiling: 21,500 ft (6,600 m)
- Rate of climb: 1,275 ft/min (6.48 m/s)
- Take-off distance to 50 ft (15 m): 3,750 ft (1,140 m)
- Landing distance from 50 ft (15 m): 4,275 ft (1,303 m)

== Notable appearances in media ==
A long sequence in the 1957 film High Flight shows the Valetta T3 used as a flying navigation classroom at RAF College Cranwell.

== See also ==
Related development

- Vickers Varsity
- Vickers VC.1 Viking

Aircraft of comparable role, configuration, and era

- Ilyushin Il-12
- Sud-Ouest Bretagne
