= Elephant Mountain (Piscataquis County, Maine) =

Mountain in Maine

- Location within Maine

Highest point
- Elevation: 2,650 ft (810 m)
- Prominence: 980 ft (300 m)
- Coordinates: 45°30′56″N 69°25′32″W

Geography
- Location: Piscataquis County, Maine, U.S.
- Topo map(s): USGS Four Mountain, Maine

Elephant Mountain is a mountain located in Bowdoin College Grant West (Maine Township 8, Range 10, NWP) Piscataquis County, Maine. It is about 5 miles (8 km) southeast of Moosehead Lake, 2 miles southwest of Baker Mountain, and 5 miles west of White Cap Mountain.

Elephant Mountain stands within the watershed of the Piscataquis River, which drains into the Penobscot River, and into Penobscot Bay. The west side of Elephant Mtn. drains into North Brook, thence into Upper Wilson Pond, Lower Wilson Pond, Big Wilson Stream, Sebec Lake, the Sebec River, and the Piscataquis River. The south and southeast faces of Elephant Mtn. drain into South Brook, thence into Upper Wilson Pond. The northeast faces of Elephant Mtn. drains into Baker Brook, thence into Mountain Pond, Mountain Pond Brook, the West Branch of the Pleasant River, and into the Piscataquis River.

On January 24, 1963, a United States Air Force B-52 plane crashed on the mountain. There are pieces of the wreckage still on the mountain. A hiking trail leads visitors to the area of the crash, where a memorial is located.

== See also ==
- List of mountains in Maine
- The B-52 Crash on Elephant Mountain, Maine
