= Serviceability failure =

In engineering, a serviceability failure occurs when a structure does not collapse, but rather fails to meet the required specifications. For example, severe wind may cause an excess of vibration at a pedestrian bridge making it impossible to cross it safely or comfortably. Similar excessive vibrations can be caused by pedestrians due to their walking, running, or jumping. Similarly, storm conditions may cause water to spill over a coastal structure, so that boats are not safe behind the structure.

Examples of serviceability failures include deformations, vibration, cracking, and leakages.
