= Norman Haggett =

English cricketer, Royal Air Force officer, and educator

Personal information
- Full name: Norman Louis Haggett
- Born: 8 July 1926; Lee, London, England
- Died: 22 February 2018 (aged 91); Oxford, Oxfordshire, England
- Batting: Right-handed
- Bowling: Right-arm slow

Career statistics
Competition	First-class
Matches	4
Runs scored	204
Batting average	25.50
100s/50s	–/1
Top score	71
Catches/stumpings	4/–
- Source: Cricinfo, 19 February 2019

Norman Louis Haggett, MBE (8 July 1926 – 22 February 2018) was an English first-class cricketer, Royal Air Force (RAF) officer and educator. Initially working as a school teacher after briefly serving with the Royal Navy in the latter years of the Second World War, Haggett joined the RAF to play for the Royal Air Force cricket team, following the recommendation of a squadron leader. His career with the RAF saw him become a member of the RAF Falcons parachute display team. After leaving the RAF in 1981, he returned to teaching, only retiring aged 91 in 2017.

== Early life and Royal Air Force ==
The son of a butcher, Haggett was born at Lee, London, on 8 July 1926. He was educated at The John Roan School, but was evacuated during the start of the Second World War to a family in Wales. He served in the Royal Navy during the final year or two of the war. Following the end of the war, he left the navy and trained as a physical education teacher at St. Pauls, Cheltenham. Shortly after completing his training he returned to London and taught at his old school. It was here that he was introduced to his wife, Beryl, who was a student at Goldsmiths College. The couple married in 1953 and moved to Bromley. A keen cricketer, Haggett's skills were spotted by a wing commander in the Royal Air Force (RAF), who encouraged him to sign up so he could play for the Royal Air Force cricket team.

Following the suggestion, he enlisted in the RAF as a flying officer in the Physical Fitness Branch in August 1956, with promotion to flight lieutenant coming in August 1960. He moved about with his wife, and by this point daughter, living in Abingdon and Boscombe Down, with a son following. He played first-class cricket for the Combined Services cricket team, playing two matches against Cambridge University and Ireland in 1962, followed up by two further appearances in 1964 against Cambridge University and Oxford University. He scored 204 runs across his four matches, with a high score of 71 and a batting average of 25.50. He also played minor matches for the RAF, including one match against an LC Stevens' XI featuring Gary Sobers; during the match Sobers was caught by Haggett off the bowling of Tony Buss.

Haggett was promoted to squadron leader in December 1967. He was a parachute instructor at the Parachute Training School at RAF Brize Norton, teaching Charles, Prince of Wales to jump. His role also included testing new parachute designs, with the failure of one such parachute leaving him with serious injuries. Nevertheless, he recovered and became a member of the RAF Falcons display team. Haggett retired from the RAF in 1981, at which point he was appointed a Member of the Order of the British Empire (MBE) in the 1981 Birthday Honours.

== Later life ==
After retiring Haggett continued his association with the RAF as a liaison officer, before switching back to teaching. He taught math and cricket at Cothill House in Oxfordshire, before joining Radley College on a voluntary basis in 1996 to coach cricket; his wife had been teaching at Radley since 1974. He soon moved back into the classroom, teaching history, before returning to math. He finally retired from teaching at Radley in 2017, aged 91 and just months before his death.

In later life, Haggett was the chairman of the West Oxfordshire Conservative Party and was a keen gardener. He died at Oxford on 22 February 2018, and was survived by his wife and two children.
