= The John Roan School =

Location
- Maze Hill; Greenwich, Greater London, SE3 7UD; England; 51.4785°N 0.0068°E

Information
- Type: Comprehensive; Academy
- Motto: Honore et labore
- Established: 1677; 349 years ago
- Founder: John Roan
- Local authority: Greenwich
- Trust: United Learning
- Department for Education URN: 147439 Tables
- Ofsted: Reports
- Headteacher: Jennie Sanderson
- Gender: Co-educational
- Age: 11 to 18
- Enrolment: 1115
- Former name: John Roan Boys' Grammar School
- Website: http://www.thejohnroan.greenwich.sch.uk/

The John Roan School is a co-educational comprehensive secondary school and sixth form located in Greenwich, south-east London, England.

== History ==
=== Grammar schools ===
The current school was originally two grammar schools. The boys' school was founded in 1677 and the girls' school in 1877 through a charitable endowment by John Roan, Yeoman of Harriers to King Charles I, who left a substantial amount in his Will:

"to bring up so many poor town-born children of Greenwich at school, that is to reading, writing, and cyphering, and each of them forty shillings per annum towards their clothing until each of them shall accomplish the age of fifteen years. The said poor children shall wear on their upper garment the cognisance or crest of me, John Roan."

The stag's head badge – derived from John Roan's coat-of-arms – has been worn by Roan schoolchildren ever since. The first chairman of the governors of the school was Dr Thomas Plume, the vicar of Greenwich.

For much of the 18th century, the school was in the charge of the Herringham family who provided four successive headmasters from 1702 to 1785. The first headmaster of the boys' school from 1877, when it opened in Eastney Street, was Mr C.M. Ridger who held the post for 33 years. He was succeeded by Mr T.R.N. Crofts (1911–1919), Mr A.H. Hope (1919–1930), Mr W.J. Potter (1931–1938), Mr H.W. Gilbert (1938–1958), Mr W.L. Garstang (1959–1974) and Dr A J Taylor (1974 to turning comprehensive in 1980, continuing as the head into the 80's) all of whom made significant contributions to the grammar school. The Hope Memorial Camp at Braithwaite, near Keswick, Cumbria was established in Mr Hope's memory shortly after he died in 1930. The first headmistress of the Roan Girls' School was Miss M.M. Blackmore (until 1895) followed by Miss M.S. Walker (1895–1919), Miss M.K. Higgs (1919–1944), Miss M.E. Barnsdale (1944–1962), Miss M.S. Chamberlain (1962–1968) and Mrs M.J. Barber (1968–1980).

=== Second World War ===
In 1940 the school was evacuated to Ammanford and Llandybie in Wales, being educated at Amman Valley County School (now Ysgol Dyffryn Aman) in the afternoons.

=== Comprehensive ===
It became a comprehensive in 1980, the new building in Westcombe was opened on 1 September 1980. The former closure of the Boys school, Girls school and Charlton school took place on 31 August 1980 and the new school began on 1 September as The John Roan School. The head of the boys school, Dr Taylor was appointed the new head of The John Roan in 1977, took all three schools through amalgamation.

It was intended that the new intake of 180 pupils would go straight into westcombe park in the 1st September 1980 but the school wasn't ready in time so the girls stayed in Devonshire Drive and the boys remained at Maze Hill. In 1981 the first new cohort started at Westcombe Park and the 1980 year group joined.

=== Potential relocation ===
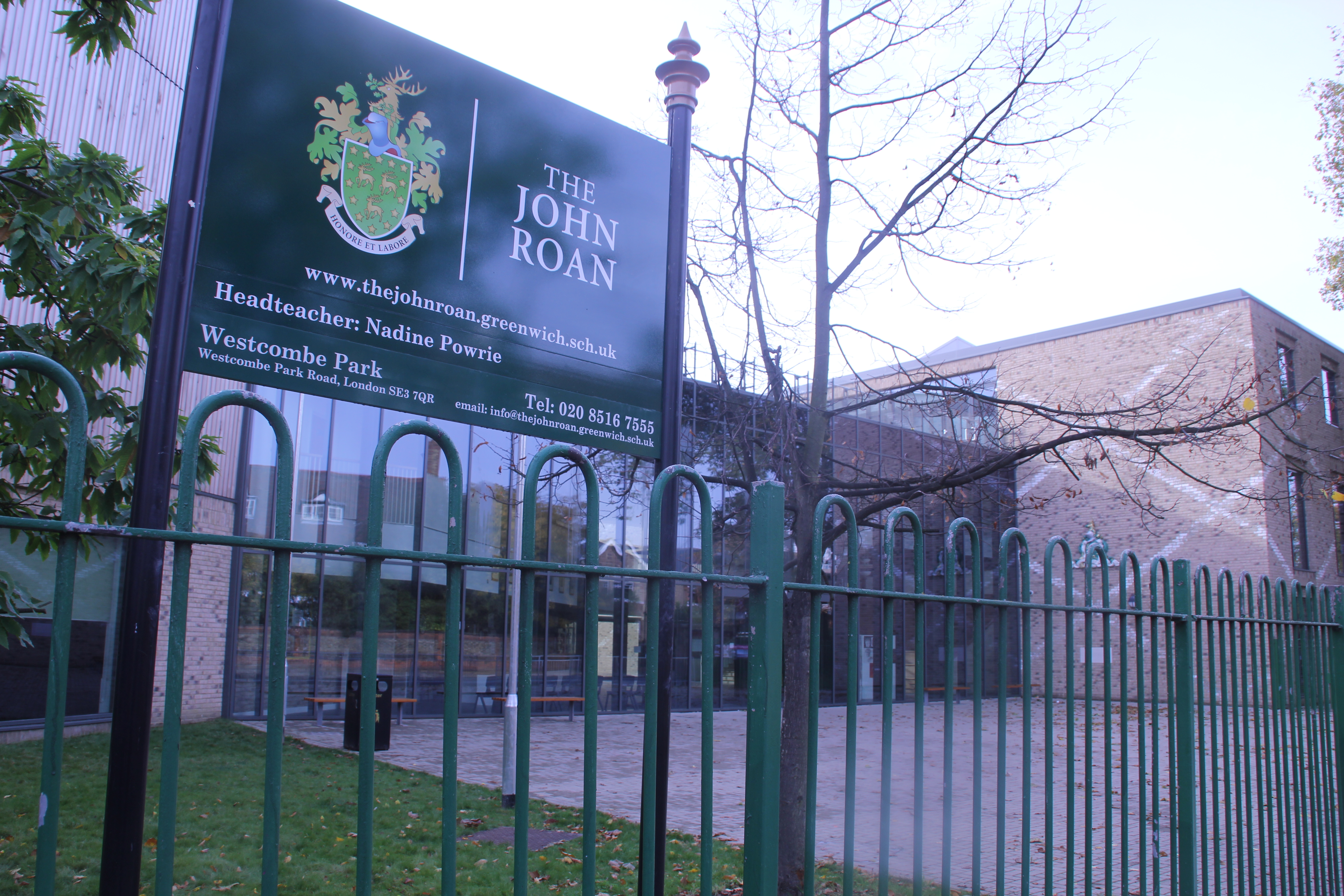
John Roan School sign and school, Westcombe Park Road (2015)

During the first decade of the 21st century, the local council proposed to relocate the school to the Greenwich Peninsula, but, facing growing local opposition, it eventually scrapped the plans. Critics among parents and local residents argued that the current sites were good, and that money should instead be invested to refurbish the current sites. The proposed site was also near to an old gasometer, which would need to be dismantled at considerable cost for safety reasons, and alongside the busy A102 Blackwall Tunnel southern approach road.

With relocation ruled out, the Westcombe Park buildings were demolished in the summer of 2012 prior to construction of replacement buildings (completed in 2014), and the Maze Hill site was refurbished and remodelled; both phases used funding originally granted when the school was due to move to the Peninsula.

=== Academisation ===
The John Roan School was inspected by Ofsted in March 2018; the resulting report, published on 8 June 2018, rated the school "Inadequate" and said it had "serious weaknesses". On 12 June 2018, the school was issued with an Academy Order. The following day, parents and staff received a letter from the University Schools Trust stating that the Regional Schools Commissioner had nominated UST to be the preferred sponsor. Some parents organised protests, seeking to get the Ofsted report withdrawn and to halt the academisation process. Teachers also organised a series of strikes (eight up to 7 November 2018) in protest at the academisation process; over 1,000 people signed a petition and 300 families raised concerns about UST finances and suitability with the school's chair of governors; but more than 100 signed a separate letter supporting the improvement plans and criticising the teachers' industrial action. On 14 November, a Greenwich Council decision about academisation of John Roan was deferred to a meeting in December 2018. On 30 August 2019, the academy plan was finally forced through, John Roan, the voluntary controlled school was closed and it was refactored as The John Roan School, a converter academy sponsored by the United Learning Trust.

== Location ==
Since 1928 the school has been located east of Greenwich Park and south-east of Greenwich town centre, having moved there from Victorian purpose-built premises in Eastney Street (now Feathers Place).

The school is currently split over two campuses — Maze Hill, where the 1920s grade II listed neo-Georgian building (architects Percy Boothroyd Dannatt and Sir Banister Fletcher) stands, and Westcombe Park — named after the roads on which they lie (respectively Maze Hill and Westcombe Park Road).

The foundation stone of the Maze Hill buildings was laid by Sir George Hopwood Hume MP, local politician and chairman of London County Council, in 1926. The school had two opening ceremonies: one in 1927, by Herbert Fisher MP, and another following completion in 1928.

The John Roan Playing Fields are located approximately two miles (3 km) to the south, in Kidbrooke Park Road, west of Sutcliffe Park.

== Motto and house teams ==
The school's motto is "With honour and hard work" (Latin: Honore et labore).

For much of its history, the school has run a house system.

As of 2025, there are four houses: Chichester, Flynn, Lawrence and Salter. The houses take their names from individuals with a special significance to either the school or the Greenwich area: Francis Chichester, Claire Flynn, Stephen Lawrence and Alfred Salter.

Until 2017, the houses were named Seacole, Da Vinci, Darwin and Stopes, named after Mary Seacole, Leonardo da Vinci, Charles Darwin and Marie Stopes. Two tutor groups per year were in the same house team. There were also house leaders and competitions amongst the four houses.

In his ‘History of the Roan School and its Founder’ [1929] Mr J W Kirby lists eight houses: School House, Drake, Collingwood, Grenville, Nelson, Raleigh, Rodney, Wolfe. In the 1950s and 1960s, the houses were named after four British naval or military figures, all connected with Greenwich, viz. Drake (house colour: green), Nelson (red), Rodney (Blue) and Wolfe (yellow).

== Notable former pupils ==
See also Category:People educated at the John Roan School.

- Ebou Adams, professional footballer at Portsmouth Football Club
- Asad Ahmad, London BBC news presenter
- Dave Berry, former MTV presenter
- Alison Blake, diplomat and Governor of the Falkland Islands
- Marc Bola, professional footballer at EFL Championship club Watford
- Eberechi Eze, professional footballer at Arsenal
- David Hillier, former Arsenal footballer
- Ivan Thomas, cricketer

=== Roan School for Girls ===
- Maria Dawson (b. 1875), botanist

=== Roan Boys' Grammar School ===
- Ralph Dean, Archbishop of Cariboo from 1971 to 1973 (Bishop from 1957)
- Harry Denford (born 1968), comedian, playwright and actor
- Sir Jack Drummond, biochemist who separated Vitamin A, and declared the chemicals that are now known as Vitamins A, B & C, and was murdered in France in 1952
- Norman Haggett (1926–2018), RAF officer, member of the RAF Falcons display team and first-class cricketer
- Peter Guy Ottewill, RAF pilot awarded George Medal for bravery
- Hugh Phillips, orthopaedic surgeon and President from 2004 to 2005 of the Royal College of Surgeons of England and of the British Orthopaedic Association from 1999 to 2000
- Montague Phillips, Chemist who first synthesised the antibiotic sulphapyradine in 1937
- John Regis, athlete, Olympic medalist
- Gavin Hunter Reid, Bishop of Maidstone from 1992 to 2001
- Ian Rickson, artistic director, Royal Court Theatre, London 1998–2006. Inter alia directed Jez Butterworth's Jerusalem(2009)
- Steve Rider, TV sports presenter
- Alfred Salter (1873–1945), Member of Parliament for Bermondsey West
- Arthur Smith, comedian
- Richard Smith, Chief Executive from 2004 to 2009 of UnitedHealth Europe, Editor from 1991 to 2004 of the BMJ, and former TV doctor for BBC Breakfast from 1983 to 1987, and brother of Arthur Smith
- Anthony Trewavas, Professor of Plant Biochemistry since 1990 at the University of Edinburgh
- Ewen Adair Whitaker (1922–2016) was a scholarship student of the Roan Grammar School.
- Peter Whittle, (born 1961) British politician, author, journalist and broadcaster
- Alan Lee Williams OBE, Labour MP (1966 to 1970, 1974 to 1979) for Hornchurch
