= Harry Denford =

British comedian

Harry Denford (born in Greenwich, London, England) is a stand up comedian, playwright, theatre director and actor.

== Education and early career ==
Harry Denford attended The John Roan School in Blackheath, London, and then went to Hendon Police College in 1986 before retraining as a commercial pilot ATPL and became a stand-up comedian. He then spent two years studying drama at London's City Literary Institute ('City Lit').

== Career ==
=== Stand-up comedy ===
Denford started on the comedy circuit in 1997, becoming noted for his loud, 'Saff' London geezer on-stage persona. Within six months of performing his first ever open mike spot, he was given his first paid spot at Jongleurs in Camden.

He performed at major comedy clubs around the UK and in 2008 was asked to become head coach for 'The London Comedy Course'.

=== Playwriting ===
Denford's best-known work to date is the aviation comedy Club Class, which since 2005 has played over 180 UK theatres including The Lowry in Manchester, Derby Playhouse, Yvonne Arnaud Theatre Guildford and the Hawth Theatre in Crawley. It has been delivered by both professional casts and amateur theatre productions and had the comic Sara Pascoe in one of the professional touring productions of the play.

While a student at City Lit, Denford wrote his first play, Sunday Supplement, which was first performed in 2004 at the Barons Court Theatre in London. In 2006 he wrote the comedy The Bridge, performed in London that year and also in 2008 at the Rosemary Branch Theatre.

In 2007 he wrote the play Joy Division about Nazi sex workers commissioned for the 'Branching Out' season in London where established writers have to produce a new theatre play on a subject they have no previous knowledge of. The play was staged again in London in 2008 and in Belfast in 2009 and 2010. In 2014 it was selected for the RADA festival performing at the Garrick Theatre and also translated into Polish and played The London Theatre.

He also co-wrote the musical The Legion with Dee Gaynor which various theatres around the UK.

In 2008 he wrote Rose Without a Thorn for The Rose Theatre on London's Bankside. This looked at the life of Catherine Howard and was the first fully costumed new full-length play to be performed at this theatre for over 400 years.

In 2009 he co-wrote the comedy He's Behind You for the Kenton Theatre in Henley which looks behind the scenes of a pantomime.

In 2014 wrote the play 'A Letter from a Ponygirl' which in 2018 a well known film studio secured the rights to for a major film production to be filmed in South Africa.

=== Theatre direction ===
Denford has directed numerous UK professional theatre productions, with performances at theatres including The Lowry in Manchester and The Rose in London. His directed works include:

- Shakers by John Godber at Barons Court Theatre in London
- The Cherry Orchard at The Stag Theatre, Sevenoaks
- Midsummer Night's Dream for Shakespeare's The Rose, Bankside (2009).

In June 2011 he became the artistic director for The London Theatre and associate director for 'Shakespeare in the Park'. At The London Theatre, he promoted several plays performed in Russian, Italian, German and French by visiting international theatre companies.
