= Patrick Hall =

Patrick Hall may refer to:

- Patrick Hall (politician) (born 1951), British Labour Party politician
- Patrick Hall (singer), contestant on season 5 of American Idol
- Patrick Hall (cricketer) (1894–1941), English cricketer
- Patrick Hall (artist) (1906–1992), British artist
- Patrick Hall (astronomer) (born 1968), Canadian-American astronomer
