= John Roan =

17th-century English benefactor

John Roan (circa 1600/1602 - 1644) was a landowner in Greenwich, London who left his estate for the founding of The John Roan School.

== Life ==
The Greenwich branch of the Roan Family came from Northamptonshire and owned land in Greenwich. They were a family of servants of the Royal Household. His father was John Roan, a Sergeant of the Scullery to James I in the Palace of Placentia. His uncle was Thomas Roane, Yeoman of the Scullery, whose son was Thomas Roane, Sergeant of the Poultry. Roan's brother was Robert Roane, father of Charles “The Immigrant” Roane of Virginia. His wife was Elizabeth.

Roan became Yeoman of His Majesty's Harriers for King Charles I of England, and/or Yeoman of His Majesty's Greyhounds.

Roan accumulated substantial land holdings. However, he was stripped of his possessions during the Civil War by Parliamentarians, having been arrested for recruiting for the King's army. Roan is buried in St Alfege Church, Greenwich. In his will, Roan left part of his estate for the education of "poor town-bred children of Greenwich", and this resulted in the founding of The John Roan School.
