= Patrick Hall (artist) =

English painter (1906-1992)

- Born: 16 December 1906; York, England
- Died: 10 June 1992 (aged 85); Ashford, Kent
- Education: York School of Art; Northampton School of Art
- Known for: Painting

For other people named Patrick Hall, see Patrick Hall (disambiguation).

William Patrick Hall (16 December 1906 – 10 June 1992), was a British artist, who mostly worked in watercolours and specialised in landscapes and town scenes.

== Biography ==
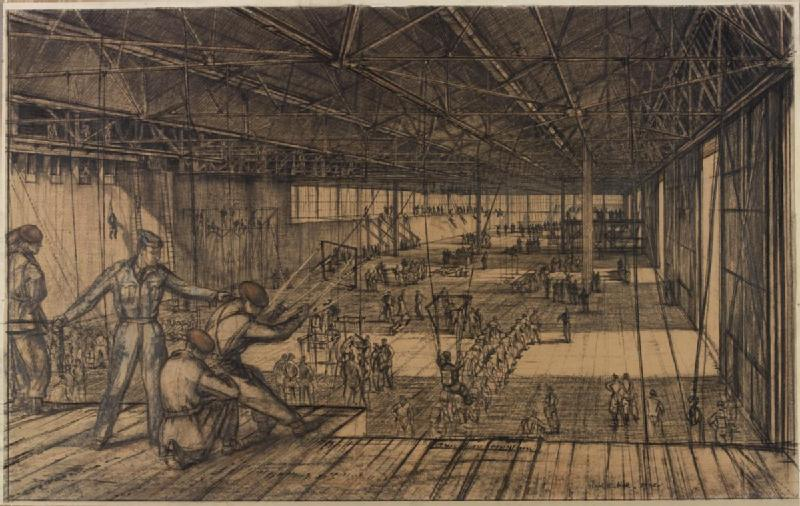
Parachute Training at Ringway (1945) (Art.IWM ART LD5635)

Hall was born in York. While still a teenager, Hall worked on a conservation project restoring the stained glass windows of York Minster. For a time, Hall worked in the family tanning business at Earswick while studying art on a part-time basis. He studied part-time at both the York and Northampton Art Schools and showed an early aptitude for etching and drypoint work.

During World War Two, the War Artists' Advisory Committee commissioned Hall to produce a number of watercolours depicting the training of paratroopers at the Parachute Training School at RAF Ringway in Cheshire. After the war Hall moved to London and set up a studio and worked full-time as an artist. He had a number of solo exhibitions, mainly focusing on landscapes and town scenes, at the Waddington Gallery, Gilbert Parr Gallery and at the Marjore Parr Gallery. He also showed works at the Royal Academy, the New English Art Club and the Paris Salon. Works by Hall are held in the collection of the Guildhall in London, the Imperial War Museum and the National Gallery of Australia. For the last twenty years of his life, Hall lived in Sellindge. He died at Ashford in Kent.
