= No. 4626 Squadron RAuxAF =

No. 4626 (County of Wiltshire) Aeromedical Evacuation Squadron
- Active: 9 September 1983 – Present
- Country: United Kingdom
- Branch: Royal Auxiliary Air Force
- Role: Casualty evacuation
- Part of: No. 38 Group Tactical Medical Wing
- Garrison/HQ: RAF Brize Norton
- Mottos: Tute Domum ("Safely Home")

Insignia
- Squadron Badge: A Wyvern Or grasping in the Dexter claw a Rod of Aesculaius proper and resting the Sinister claw on a Cross Gules.The Wyvern was an ancient animal reputedly from Wiltshire and was used on the badge of RAF Hullavington base, where 4626 were based between 1986 and 1995. The rod and red cross denote the medical role of the squadron

No. 4626 (County of Wiltshire) Aeromedical Evacuation Squadron is a unit of the British Royal Auxiliary Air Force, which manages, maintains and trains its personnel for operational readiness in support of RAF requirements for Aeromedical Evacuation and Pre-Hospital Emergency Care, Primary Healthcare (PHC) (Role 1) and individual augmentees to other military healthcare capabilities, in times of conflict or crisis (under the provision of the Reserve Forces Act 1996).

== Role ==
4626 Squadron provides additional air evacuation (patient care pathway) of military and civilian personnel from many front line locations around the world, and is the only Aeromedical Evacuation Squadron in the Auxiliary Air Force. It has recently grown into wider areas of responsibility, including Pre-Hospital Emergency Care and Primary Healthcare. The Squadron comprises Ground Handling Flights (involved in ground-based patient care) and Aeromedical Flights (qualified to fly with patients), the Aeromedical Staging Unit (ASU) and the provision of Individual Augmentees to deployable medical capabilities of the RAF Medical Services (such as Role 1 PHC). Besides its regular staff of doctors, nurses and other medical personnel, 4626 also supplies paramedics for deployment on MERT (Medical Emergency Response Team) and specialist medical personnel for CCAST (Critical Care Air Support Team).

== Operational history ==
4626 Squadron was formed on 9 September 1983. It was initially based at RAF Wroughton, then from 1986 at RAF Hullavington, before moving to RAF Lyneham in 1995. Since Lyneham's closure in December 2012 it has been based at RAF Brize Norton.

The Squadron was mobilized in 1991 to support Operation Granby during the First Gulf War, based in Saudi Arabia. Following Granby, members of the Squadron were deployed on Operation Provide Comfort, a humanitarian mission to aid displaced Kurds. The Squadron was later involved in operations in the Balkans and Sierra Leone.

The Squadron was again fully mobilised in January 2003 to support operations in Operation Telic, the British part of the invasion of Iraq. Based in Cyprus, Kuwait, Iraq and the UK, the squadron flew more than 75 missions in three months, and evacuated more than 2,000 casualties.

From May 2006 until the drawdown of UK military personnel in 2014, the squadron provided support to Operation Herrick in Afghanistan, mainly in the aeromedical role, though members of the squadron have also served in the medical facilities at Camp Bastion, and as combat paramedics.
