= RAF Brize Norton =

Royal Air Force station in England

RAF Brize Norton
- Near Carterton, Oxfordshire in England
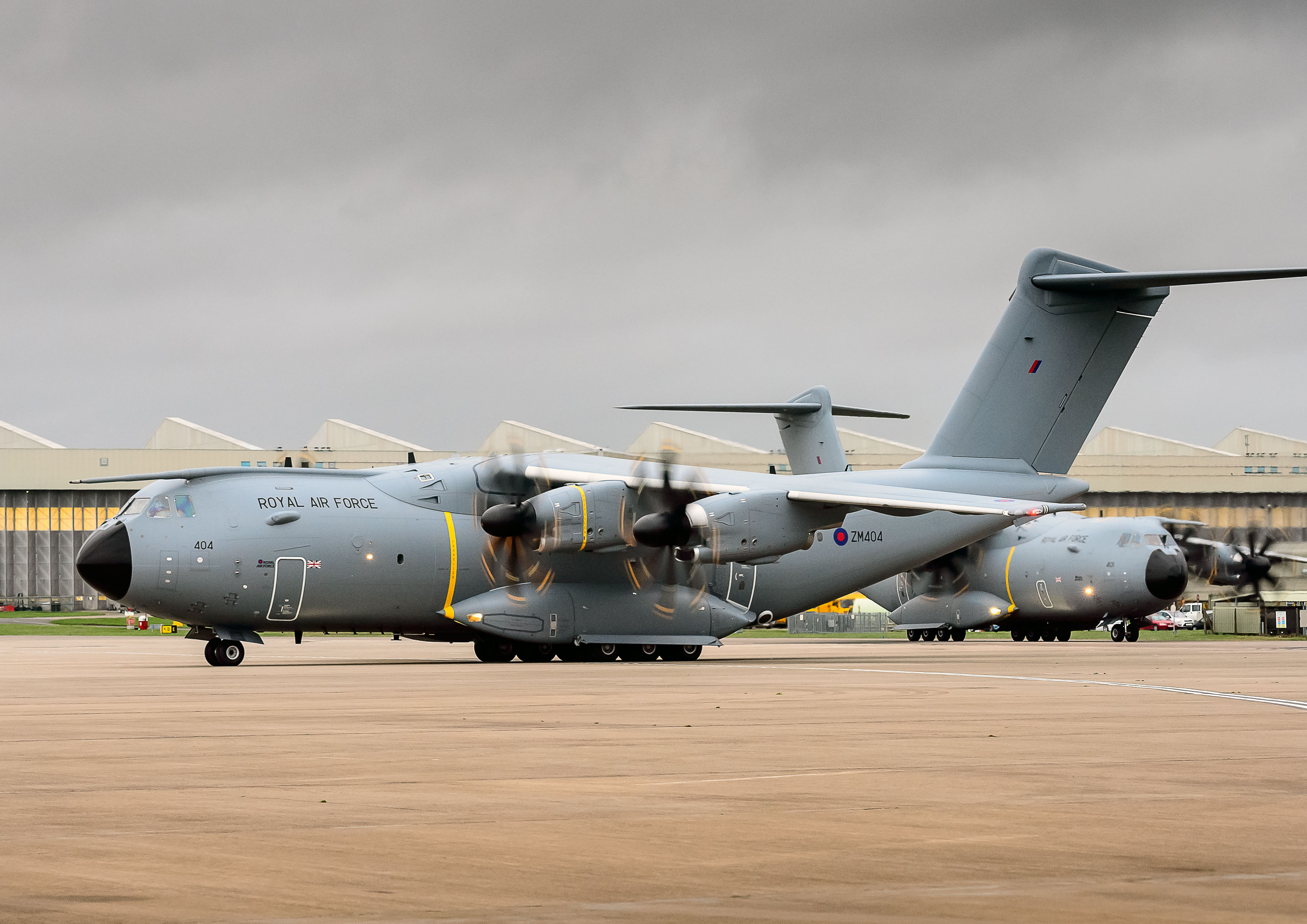
- An A400M Atlas at RAF Brize Norton

- Transire Confidenter (Latin for 'Move with confidence')

Site information
- Type: Main Operating Base
- Owner: Ministry of Defence
- Operator: Royal Air Force
- Controlled by: No. 2 Group (Air Combat Support)
- Condition: Operational
- Website: www.raf.mod.uk/our-organisation/stations/raf-brize-norton/

Location
- Shown within Oxfordshire
- Coordinates: 51°45′00″N 001°35′01″W
- Grid reference: SP295060
- Area: 4.81 square kilometres (1,190 acres)

Site history
- Built: 1935
- In use: 1937 – present

Garrison information
- Current commander: Group Captain Louise Henton
- Occupants: No. 10 Squadron; No. 24 Squadron; No. 30 Squadron; No. 70 Squadron; No. 99 Squadron; No. 101 Squadron; No. 206 Squadron; See Based units section for full list.

Airfield information
- Identifiers: IATA: BZZ, ICAO: EGVN, WMO: 03649
- Elevation: 287 feet (87 m) AMSL
Runways
Direction	Length and surface
07/25	3,050 metres (10,007 ft) Asphalt
- Source: RAF Brize Norton Defence Aerodrome Manual

RAF Brize Norton (/braɪz/, IATA: BZZ, ICAO: EGVN) is the largest station of the Royal Air Force in the United Kingdom. It is located in Oxfordshire, approximately 75 miles (121 km) west-northwest of London, near the village of Brize Norton and the towns of Carterton and Witney.

The station is the base for air transport, air-to-air refuelling and military parachuting, with the Boeing C-17 Globemaster III, Airbus A400M Atlas and Airbus Voyager operating from the station.

Major infrastructure redevelopment began in 2010, ahead of the closure of RAF Lyneham in 2012, and Brize Norton became the sole air point of embarkation for British troops.

== History ==
=== Royal Air Force ===
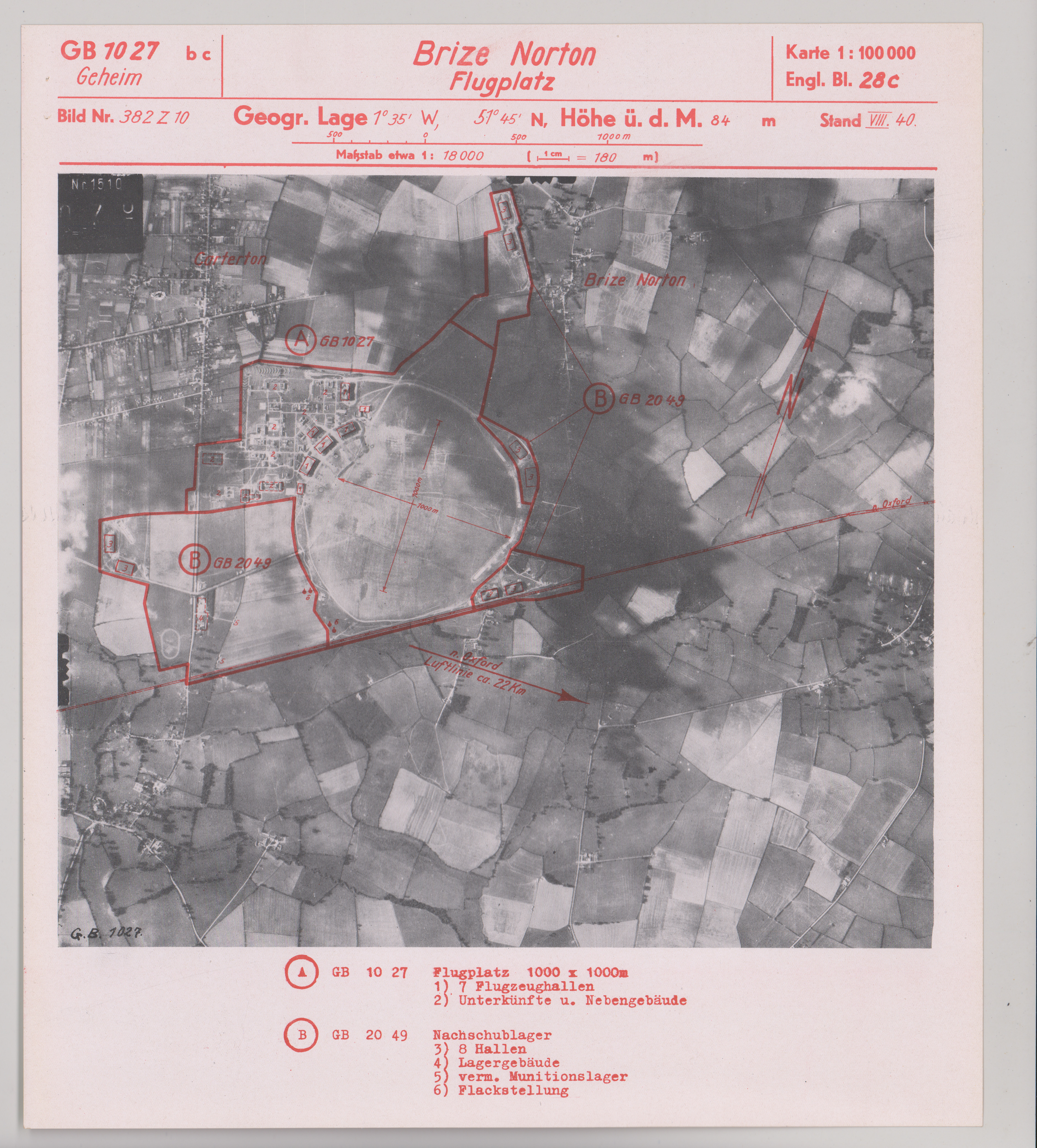
RAF Brize Norton on a target dossier of the German Luftwaffe, 1940

Construction of RAF Brize Norton began in 1935 with the official opening taking place on 13 August 1937. The station was originally to be named RAF Carterton, given its proximity and relationship with the town of the same name, but was instead named RAF Brize Norton to avoid possible confusion with RAF Cardington in Bedfordshire. The station's first unit, No. 2 Flying Training School (No. 2 FTS) transferred from RAF Digby in Lincolnshire on 7 September 1937. On 10 October 1938, No. 2 FTS was joined by No. 6 Maintenance Unit (No. 6 MU).

One of the first operational squadrons to use the airfield was a detachment of No. 110 Squadron which operated from Brize Norton from June 1939 with the Bristol Blenheim Mk.1 and IV. No. 2 FTS was renamed No. 2 Service Flying Training School (No. 2 SFTS) in September 1939, when it re-equipped with the Airspeed Oxford. No. 16 Service Training School, equipped with the North American Harvard, moved to Brize Norton in June 1940. On 16 August, the airfield was attacked by Luftwaffe bombers, with thirty-five Oxfords and eleven Hawker Hurricanes destroyed. No. 16 SFTS left later that year, but No. 2 SFTS and No. 6 MU continued to use the airfield, with No. 1525 Beam Approach Training Flight arriving in February 1942.

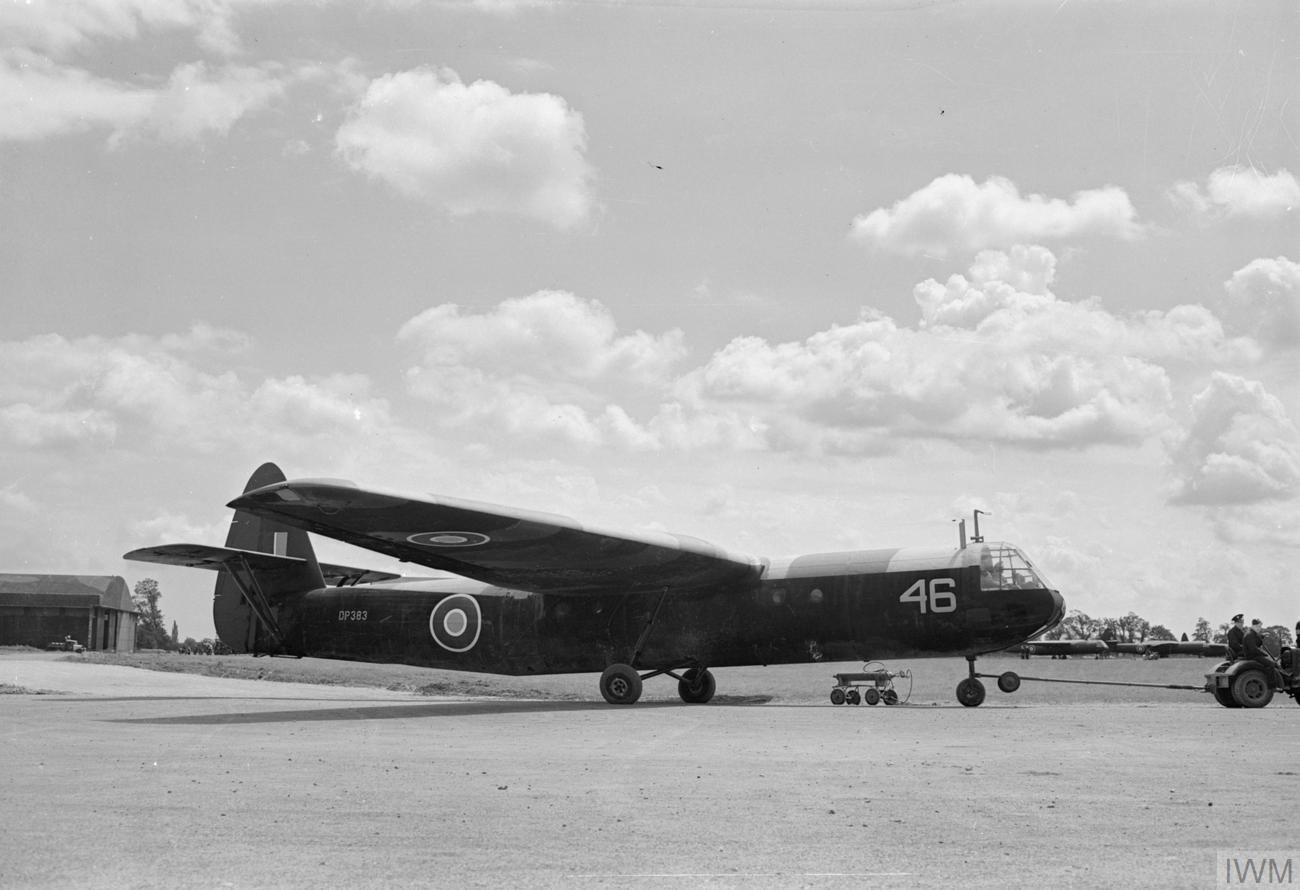
An Airspeed Horsa Mk.1 of the Heavy Glider Conversion Unit at Brize Norton during the Second World War

The No. 110 Squadron detachment left Brize Norton on 17 March 1942, when the squadron departed for Asia. The two flying training units left on 16 July 1942 to make way for a new user, the Heavy Glider Conversion Unit (HGCU), equipped with Whitley glider tugs and Airspeed Horsa gliders. No. 296 Squadron and No. 297 Squadron both moved in on 14 March 1944 with their Armstrong Whitworth Albemarles, displacing the Heavy Glider Conversion Unit, which moved to RAF North Luffenham. The two Squadrons took part in the Invasion of France on 6 June 1944 and Operation Market Garden in September 1944, before No. 296 Squadron added the Handley Page Halifax Mk.V to their inventory and moved to RAF Earls Colne on 29 September 1944. No. 297 Squadron also moved there a day later.

The HGCU (soon renumbered No. 21 HGCU) returned on 15 October 1944, remaining at Brize Norton until 31 December 1945. The Transport Command Development Unit (TCDU) moved in during 1946, operating a variety of equipment until it departed in June 1949. No. 297 Squadron returned after the Second World War ended, on 5 September 1946 with the Halifax Mk.A.7 and A.9 from RAF Tarrant Rushton, before leaving on 21 August 1947 for RAF Fairford. After the TCDU left in June 1949, No, 2 Squadron of the Central Flying School, equipped with the Harvard, moved in, followed by No. 204 Advanced Flying School, equipped with the de Havilland Mosquito, staying at Brize Norton until March and June 1950 respectively.

=== United States Air Force ===
By 1950, elements of the United States Air Force's (USAF) Strategic Air Command (SAC) were based at RAF Lakenheath, RAF Marham, and RAF Sculthorpe. The increasing tension of the Cold War led to a re-evaluation of these deployments. In 1953, SAC bombers began to move further west, behind RAF fighter forces, to Brize Norton, RAF Greenham Common, RAF Upper Heyford, and RAF Fairford. As with the other stations it occupied, SAC invested heavily in extending the runway (6,000 to 9,000 ft (1,829 to 2,743 m)), taxiways and dispersals, and constructing accommodation and weapons handling facilities. This work was completed in April 1951.

In December 1952, command of the station was transferred from U.S. Air Forces in Europe (USAFE) to SAC. The 30th Air Depot Wing became the 3rd Air Force unit responsible for control of all personnel at Brize Norton, upon receipt of instructions to control base functions. The station was assigned to the 7th Air Division and operated by the 3920th Air Base Group, which was renamed as the 3920th Combat Support Group, and then the 3920th Strategic Wing in 1964. The 3920th ceased operations in 1965.

June 1952 saw the first major USAF deployment, of twenty-one Convair B-36 Peacemaker strategic bombers of the 11th Bomb Wing for eight days. Boeing B-29 Superfortress and the KB-29 air-air tankers of the 301st Bombardment Wing were based at Brize Norton on temporary duty from December 1952 to April 1953.

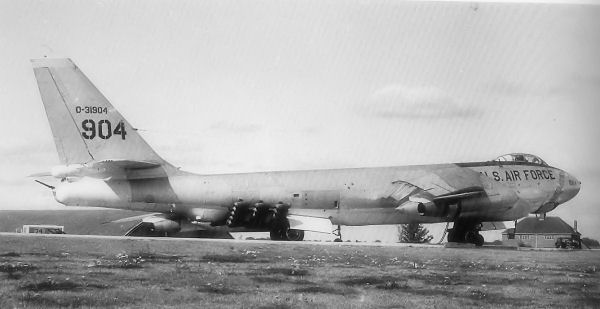
A US Air Force B-47 Stratojet at Brize Norton in 1954

From September 1953, units equipped with the Boeing B-47E Stratojet six-engined bombers began to be deployed to Brize Norton on 90-day temporary deployments, with boom-equipped Boeing KC-97G Stratofreighters deployed in support from December 1954. In 1956, Brize Norton was closed for runway repairs. Later deployments included KC-97 and Boeing KC-135 Stratotanker, and the first Convair B-58 Hustler and Boeing B-52 Stratofortress bombers to land in the United Kingdom.

From 1958, B-47 deployments changed from 90-day temporary deployments to 30-day Operation Reflex alerts, in which the aircraft did little flying, but were held at a high degree of readiness, armed with nuclear bombs, on special aprons on the south side of the airbase. In September 1964, the USAF announced that Reflex operations would cease and that Brize Norton would be returned to the RAF.

=== Back to Royal Air Force control ===
With RAF Lyneham, the home of RAF Transport Command's Bristol Britannia and De Havilland Comet fleets operating at capacity, the planned introduction to RAF service of the Vickers VC10 and Short Belfast created a requirement for an additional major strategic transport airfield. The planned withdrawal of the USAF, its long runway and close proximity to army bases in the south of England, resulted in Brize Norton being selected for the role in 1963.

The base was formally returned to the RAF on 1 April 1965. The last SAC aircraft, a B-47E of the 380th Bombardment Wing left the base on 3 April. USAF personnel left on 31 May.

In May 1967, No. 10 Squadron, equipped with the Vickers VC10 C.1 jet transport and No. 53 Squadron equipped with the Short Belfast C.1 heavy lift turboprop freighter moved from RAF Fairford. As facilities at Brize Norton were still unfinished, they used RAF Lyneham as a passenger terminal until October 1968.

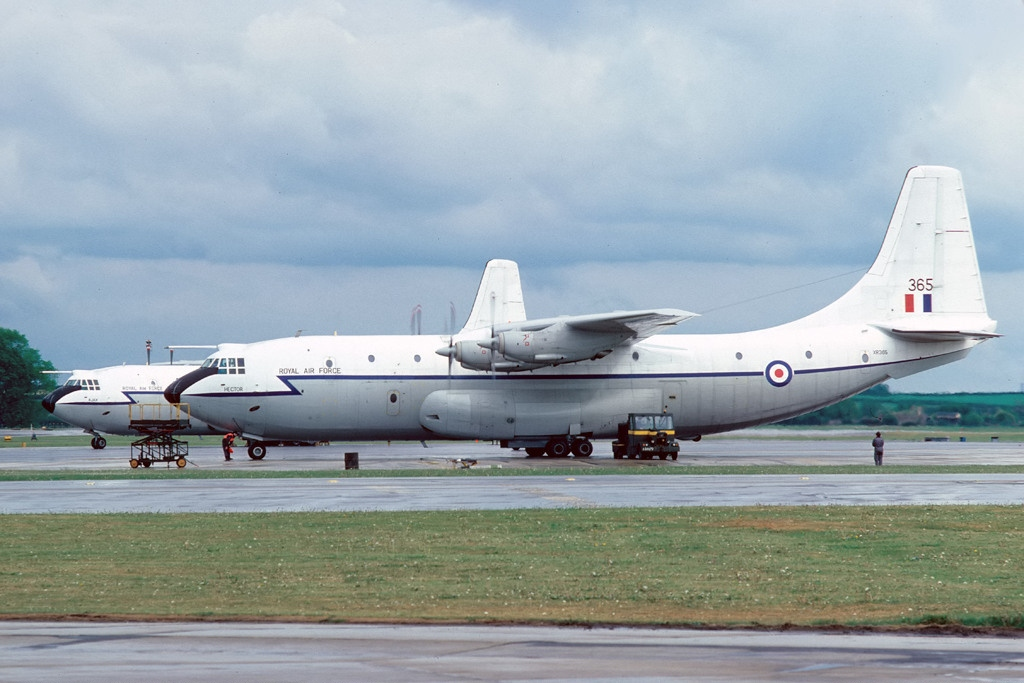
No. 53 Squadron operated the Short Belfast C.1 from Brize Norton in the 1960s and 1970s

In 1970, two squadrons No. 99 Squadron and No. 511 Squadron operating the Bristol Britannia moved from RAF Lyneham. Both squadrons were disbanded in 1976, along with No. 53 Squadron, operating the Short Belfast C.1 In the same year, No. 115 Squadron moved from RAF Cottesmore, operating the Hawker Siddeley Andover in the radar calibration role. The squadron moved to RAF Benson in 1983.

In May 1984, No. 101 Squadron reformed at Brize Norton, flying the converted former civil VC-10, heavily modified and updated by British Aerospace for military service as aerial refuelling tankers between 1983 and 1993. Of the thirty-nine airline aircraft acquired by the RAF, thirteen were converted, while the remainder were cannibalised for spare parts. These converted VC-10s were all three-point tankers, capable of refuelling one aircraft, typically another large aircraft, using the main hose or two smaller aircraft using the underwing pods. The variants were designated K.2, K.3 and K.4.

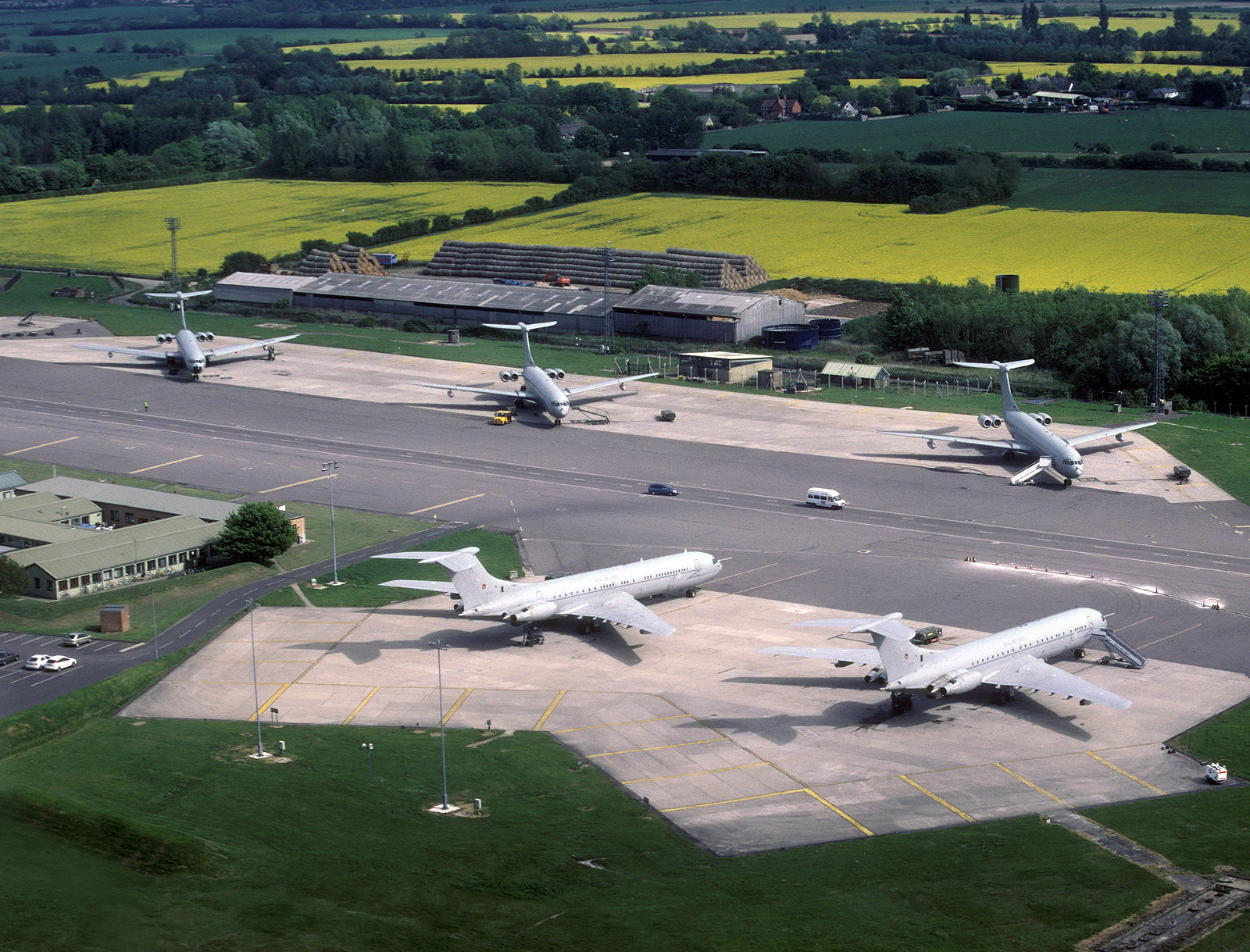
Vickers VC-10 aircraft parked at Brize Norton in 2003. The aircraft was operated by the RAF from the 1960s to 2013

Following the Falklands War, the RAF found itself lacking in the strategic transport capabilities required to sustain the expanded military presence there. As a result, No. 216 Squadron was reformed at Brize Norton in November 1984, initially flying six ex-British Airways Lockheed L-1011 TriStars, followed by three more from Pan-Am.

In August 1995, the Air Traffic Control Centre reopened following works to the radar and associated equipment costing £1.2 million.

In May 2001, the RAF's first C-17A Globemaster III arrived at Brize Norton, one of eight to be delivered to No. 99 Squadron. In October 2005, No. 10 Squadron was disbanded, the aircrew and aircraft being merged with No. 101 Squadron.

Like other UK military bases, for example RAF Fairford, Faslane Naval Base, RAF Lakenheath, and Menwith Hill, RAF Brize Norton has been subject to limited protests by peace demonstrators. During the 2003 Iraq War, four anti-war protesters managed to access the main runway in an attempt to prevent aircraft taking off. A peace camp was held at the station from 21 to 25 April 2005, along with a demonstration in nearby Carterton. On 12 August 2006, campaigners restricted access at the main entrance for several hours in a protest against British foreign policy in the Middle East.

In April 2007, work to repair and upgrade the runways commenced, and repatriation of British personnel was transferred to RAF Lyneham at the same time. With the closure of RAF Lyneham taking place in late 2011, the repatriation transferred back to Brize Norton on 8 September 2011. To accommodate the repatriation services, a purpose-built centre was constructed, and an exit gate was refurbished and named the Britannia Gate.

=== Redevelopment as a transport base ===
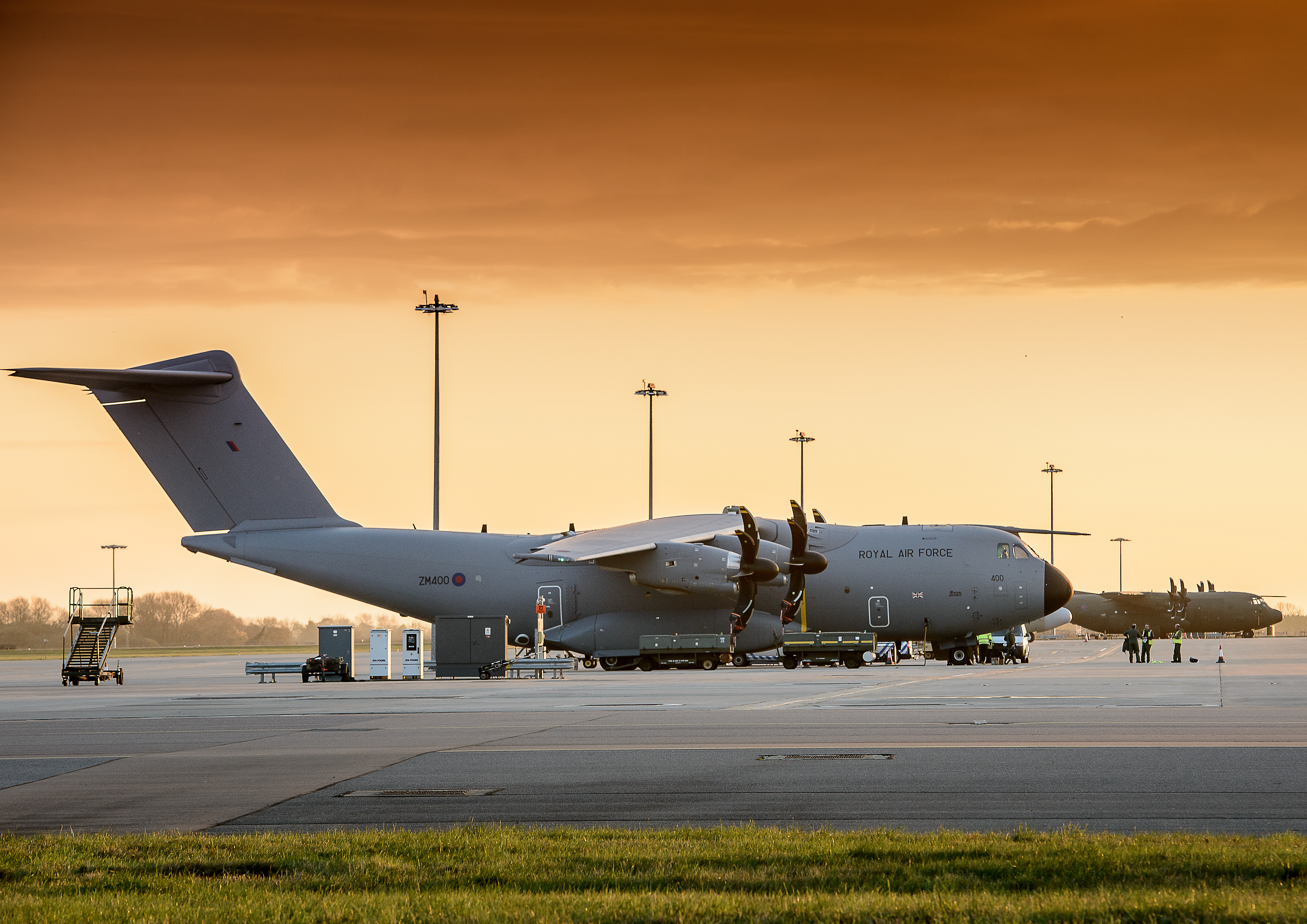
An A400M Atlas C1 at Brize Norton in 2014

Brize Norton was redeveloped as the major airbase for the RAF's transport fleet. The end of flying from RAF Lyneham in September 2011 made Brize Norton the sole "Air Point of Embarkation", the main operating base for RAF air transport and in-air refuelling aircraft, and home to 15% of RAF uniformed manpower. All the RAF's fixed wing transport assets were consolidated at Brize Norton, with the transfer of the entire C-130 Hercules force, together with the entry into service of the Airbus A400M and the A330 Voyager.

To accommodate this expansion, with the number of aircraft stationed at Brize Norton increasing from twenty-eight to sixty-seven, a major infrastructure redevelopment, "Programme Future Brize" was established in 2009. The project involved the overhaul of virtually every element of the airfield's infrastructure, including IT, engineering, housing and personnel.

In January 2011, a new station chapel and chaplaincy centre was opened by the RAF Chaplain-in-Chief, The Venerable (Air Vice Marshal) Ray Pentland.

By March 2011, seventy buildings had been refurbished on the station. As part of work to prepare for the introduction of A330 Voyager aircraft into active service, a new hangar and office complex was opened in the same month.

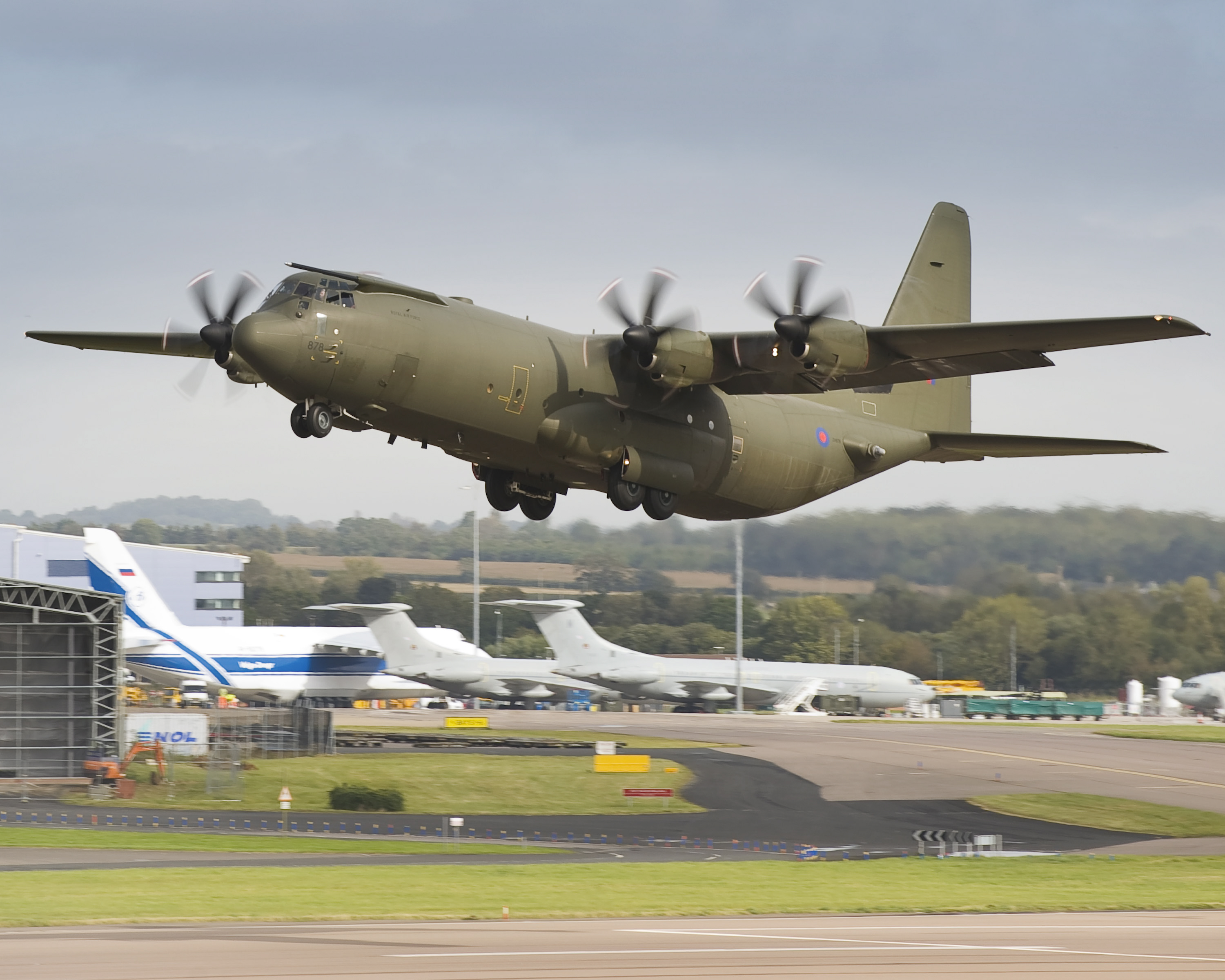
A RAF C-130J Hercules C4 taking off from Brize Norton in 2012

The C-130 Hercules fleet at RAF Lyneham moved to Brize Norton in July 2011. The final four aircraft flew to the station, conducting a flypast over Wiltshire. Group Captain John Gladstone, Station Commander of RAF Lyneham, flew the lead Hercules, which carried the standards of the Hercules squadrons. These were presented to the Station Commander of RAF Brize Norton, Group Captain Dom Stamp in a welcoming ceremony.

In February 2012, work started on converting a Second World War era hangar, located north of the main airfield site, into new accommodation for the RAF Tactical Medical Wing (TMW) and No. 4626 (County of Wiltshire) Aeromedical Evacuation Squadron (RAuxAF). The work, which cost £15 million, included a single storey temperature controlled facility within the hangar for the TMW's operational stores facilities, office accommodation, a training building and external training area. The facilities opened in July 2013 and allowed the TMW and No. 4626 Squadron to move to Brize Norton from RAF Lyneham.

In February 2014, a Voyager flying from the base suffered an accident. A Voyager with the registration ZZ333 was conducting a ferrying flight from Brize Norton, Carterton to Camp Bastion, Afghanistan. On 9 February 2014, the aircraft operating the route, an Airbus A330 MRTT (A330-243MRTT) had an incident occur over Turkey with multiple nonfatal casualties, forcing the captain to divert the flight to Incirlik Air Base in southern Turkey. The cause of the accident was a combination of mismanagement in the military commercial flight space regarding permittance of loose article in the cockpit, limits on the time that a flight can be left with a single pilot during flight, and an atmosphere of boredom and inattentiveness during similar flights due to low workload. There were no deaths but the captain received harsh military punishments and was dismissed from service for his negligence in the incident.

In August 2017, the station's Air Movements Squadron subordinated to No. 1 Air Mobility Wing (1AMW), a high readiness unit providing early entry air movements support, forming part of the RAF's A4 Force which specialises in logistic support for expeditionary air operations.

In February 2018, a new maintenance hangar capable of accommodating three A400M Atlas aircraft was opened by Minister for Defence Procurement Guto Bebb. The hangar, located on the eastern side of the airfield, cost approximately £70 million and provides 24,000 square metres of floor space.

In September 2018, No. 2 Squadron RAF Regiment, which provides protection to the Air Mobility Force, moved to the station from RAF Honington in Suffolk. No. 30 Squadron reformed in September 2021 to operate the A400M Atlas, becoming the second frontline Atlas unit.

In June 2023, after 56 years of RAF service, the C-130 Hercules was retired from and No. 47 Squadron disbanded, with the tactical air transport capability transitioning to the A400M Atlas.

In June 2025 it was announced that the Ministry of Defence intended to award a £170 million contract to AirTanker Services Limited for a major upgrade to the Voyager tanker aircraft fleet. The upgrade, known as the Voyager Operating System Evolution (VOSE), would cover the design, development, certification, and through-life support of a new mission system for the RAF’s Future Strategic Tanker Aircraft (FSTA). The work is expected to be carried out at RAF Brize Norton.

=== 2025 protest and Brize Norton 6 ===
On 20 June 2025, activists associated with Palestine Action entered the airbase without authorization and damaged two Airbus Voyager aircraft by spraying red paint into their engines and across parts of the airfield. The group released video footage of the action and stated that it was intended as a direct action protest against the United Kingdom's military support for Israel during the Gaza war.

The Ministry of Defence condemned the incident as an act of vandalism and launched a review of security arrangements across the defence estate. Prime Minister Keir Starmer described the breach as "disgraceful", while Defence Secretary John Healey ordered an investigation into how the activists had gained access to one of the UK's most important military installations. The RAF stated that operations at the base continued following the incident.

Counter Terrorism Policing led the criminal investigation, citing the potential implications for national security. On 3 July 2025, four individuals were charged with conspiracy to enter a prohibited place for a purpose prejudicial to the safety or interests of the United Kingdom under the National Security Act 2023, as well as conspiracy to commit criminal damage. The fifth and sixth suspects were charged and remanded in custody in August 2025 and May 2026 respectively, pending trial.

The incident prompted wider political and legal consequences. On 23 June 2025, Home Secretary Yvette Cooper announced the government's intention to proscribe Palestine Action under the Terrorism Act 2000. The proposal was subsequently approved by Parliament, making the organization a proscribed terrorist group under UK law. The decision generated debate over the distinction between direct action protest and national security while also prompting renewed scrutiny of security at UK military installations.

The group released a statement that RAF flights to Cyprus aid the Gaza genocide. "Flights depart daily from the base to RAF Akrotiri in Cyprus," the group said on X accompanied by video footage. "From Cyprus, British planes collect intelligence, refuel fighter jets and transport weapons to commit genocide in Gaza."

== Role and operations ==
=== Transport operations ===
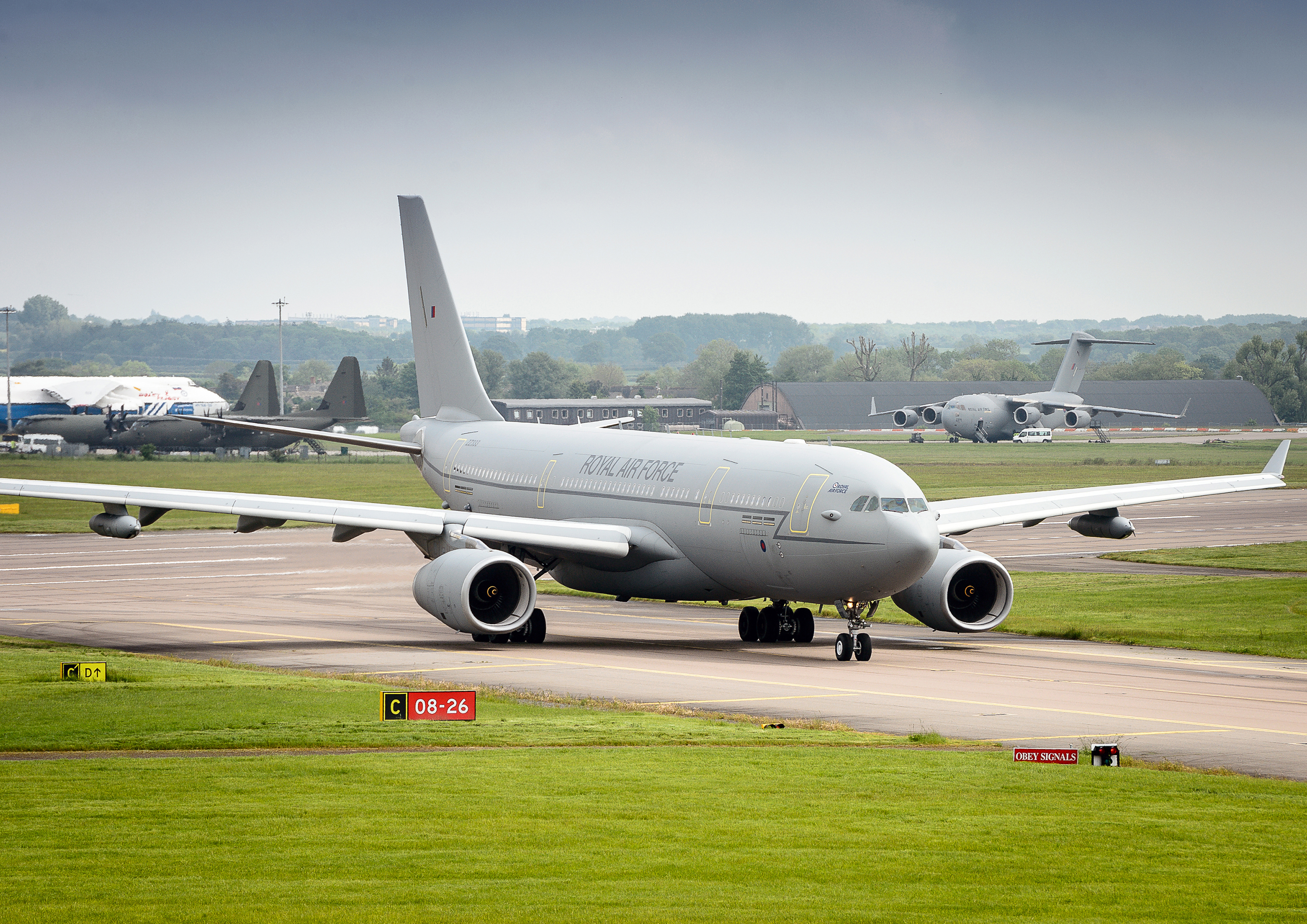
An A330 Voyager at Brize Norton in 2014. Other aircraft of the RAF's transport fleet, the C-17A Globemaster III and C-130 Hercules are in the background

The station is home to approximately 5,800 military staff, 1,200 contractors and 300 civilian staff. The station accommodates the RAF's strategic and tactical air transport and air-to-air refuelling fleets, operating the Boeing C-17 Globemaster III, Airbus A400M Atlas and Airbus A330 MRTT Voyager. The A330 is operated by AirTanker Services under the Future Strategic Tanker Aircraft contract.

Civilian passengers had been permitted on flights to and from RAF Ascension Island with reservations handled by AW Ship Management, with some customers doing package deals combined with the RMS Saint Helena, which travelled between Saint Helena and Cape Town, South Africa until the opening of St Helena Airport to passenger flights.

=== Expeditionary Air Wing ===
No. 38 Expeditionary Air Wing was formed at Brize Norton in April 2006 and acts as a deployable command and control headquarters to support Air Mobility Operations.

=== Supported units ===
The station is home to Joint Air Delivery Test and Evaluation Unit (JADTEU) – a tri-service unit that tests and evaluates air transportation methods, No.1 Parachute Training School RAF – a training school for airborne forces, and No 1 Air Mobility Wing – an air combat support unit on high readiness to deploy specialist movements personnel worldwide.

== Based units ==
Flying and notable non-flying units based at RAF Brize Norton.

=== Royal Air Force ===
No. 2 Group (Air Combat Support) RAF

- Air Mobility Force
  - Air Mobility Force Headquarters
  - No.10 Squadron – Voyager KC2/KC3
  - No. 24 Squadron – A400M Atlas and C-17 Globemaster III – Operational Conversion Unit (OCU)
  - No. 30 Squadron – A400M Atlas
  - No. 70 Squadron – A400M Atlas
  - No. 99 Squadron – C-17 Globemaster III
  - No. 101 Squadron – Voyager KC2/KC3
  - No. 38 Expeditionary Air Wing
  - No. 622 (Reserve Aircrew) Squadron (Royal Auxiliary Air Force)
  - Airborne Delivery Wing
    - Headquarters and Operation Squadron
    - Performance Development Squadron
      - RAF Falcons Parachute Display Team
    - Parachute Engineering Squadron
    - Parachute Training Squadron
    - Support Squadron
  - Airport of Embarkation Wing
- Air Security Force
  - No. 2 RAF Police & Security Wing
    - No. 2 RAF Police & Security Wing Headquarters
    - No. 7 RAF Police (Air Mobility) Squadron
- Combat and Readiness Force
  - No. 2 Squadron RAF Regiment
  - No. 2624 (County of Oxford) Squadron Royal Auxiliary Air Force Regiment|No. 2624 (County of Oxford) Squadron (Royal Auxiliary Air Force Regiment)
- Support Force
  - No. 1 Air Mobility Wing
    - Air Movements Squadron
    - Operational Support Squadron
    - United Kingdom Mobile Air Movements Squadron
  - Reserves Logistics Support Wing
    - No. 501 (County of Gloucester) Squadron (Royal Auxiliary Air Force)
  - No. 4624 (County of Oxford) Movements Squadron (Royal Auxiliary Air Force)
  - RAF Medical Services
    - Tactical Medical Wing
      - Headquarters Tactical Medical Wing
      - Aeromedical Evacuation Control Centre
      - Aeromedical Evacuation Squadron
      - Capability and Sustainment Squadron
      - Operations Squadron
      - Training Squadron
    - Medical Reserves Support Cell
      - No. 4626 (County of Wiltshire) Aeromedical Evacuation Squadron (Royal Auxiliary Air Force)

No. 1 Group RAF

- RAF Air and Space Warfare Centre
  - No. 206 Squadron – A400M Atlas and C-17 Globemaster III – Test and Evaluation
  - Joint Air Delivery Test & Evaluation Unit (JADTEU)

No. 22 Group (Training) RAF

- No. 2267 (Brize Norton) Squadron (Air Training Corps)

=== British Army ===
Royal Logistic Corps

- 13 Air Assault Support Regiment
  - 47 Air Despatch Squadron

Defence College of Logistics, Policing, and Administration

- Defence School of Logistics
  - Logistics Specialist Training Wing
    - Defence Movements Training Squadron

=== Civilian ===
- RAF Brize Norton Flying Club – Piper PA-28 Warrior

== Previous units ==
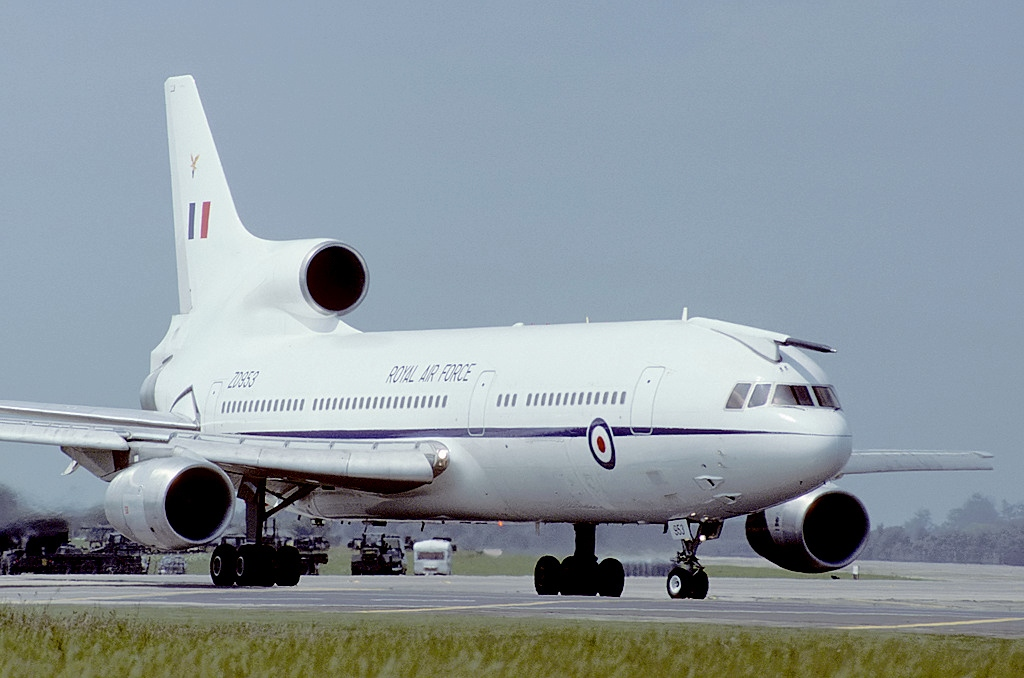
No. 216 Squadron operated the Lockheed TriStar in passenger transport, air cargo, aerial refuelling tanker, and aeromedical roles from RAF Brize Norton between 1985 and 2014.

List of flying squadrons and units previously based at RAF Brize Norton
squadron	from	to	aircraft	ref
No. 53 Squadron RAF	1967	1976	Short Belfast C1	
No. 115 Squadron RAF	1976	1983	Armstrong Whitworth Argosy, Hawker Siddeley Andover	
No. 216 Squadron RAF	1985	2014	TriStar K1, KC1 & C2/C2A	
No. 296 Squadron RAF	1943	1944	Armstrong Whitworth Albemarle	
No. 297 Squadron RAF	1944	—	Armstrong Whitworth Albemarle	
No. 511 Squadron RAF	1970	1976	Bristol Britannia	
No. 241 Operational Conversion Unit RAF	—	—	training and checking crews for Belfast, Britannia, and VC10	

== Heritage ==
=== Station badge and motto ===
Brize Norton's badge, awarded in January 1968, features a knight's helmet with two blue ostrich feathers against the backdrop of an arched castle gateway. The gateway represents the station's role as the hub for UK troops and transport aircraft departing on worldwide operations. The helm represents the military personnel carried from the station.

The station's motto (Transire confidenter) is in Latin and translates into English as Pass through confidently, acknowledging the station's gateway role.

=== Gate guardian ===
Unlike many RAF stations, Brize Norton does not have an aircraft on display as a gate guardian. In October 2017, a sculpture by local artist David Harber was unveiled to mark the station's 80th anniversary. Named Gate Guardian, the metal sculpture depicts a globe circled by four of Brize Norton's aircraft, an Atlas, a Voyager, a Globemaster and a Hercules.

== Community relations and media ==
RAF Brize Norton enjoys the freedom of Carterton, Exeter, and Torbay.

The station magazine is called 51º North, in reference to the latitude of Brize Norton (51º 45'). The magazine is distributed to station personnel, their families and the local community and is available on-line.

The station featured in the 2013 observational documentary series Inside RAF Brize Norton. The seven-part series followed activity at the station during 2012 and was shown on Sky One.

The station hosted parachute training for the cast of Band of Brothers, HBO's award-winning miniseries about E (Easy) Company, 506th Parachute Infantry Regiment, 101st Airborne Division during the Second World War in Europe, ahead of filming. The parachute training at the station including a wire descent from a jump tower, was the culmination of a 10-day pre-filming boot camp that had begun at Longmoor Military Camp and was included in an official HBO video diary by Ron Livingston (Lewis Nixon).

== See also ==
- List of Royal Air Force stations
- Strategic Air Command in the United Kingdom
