= Airborne Delivery Wing =

- Wing badge
- Active: 21 June 1940 – present
- Country: United Kingdom
- Branch: Royal Air Force
- Type: Training wing
- Role: Tri-service parachute training
- Part of: Air Mobility Force
- Station: RAF Brize Norton
- Motto: Knowledge dispels fear
- Aircraft: Dornier 228
- Website: Airborne Delivery Wing

Insignia
- Flying badge

The Airborne Delivery Wing is a Royal Air Force training unit that provides parachute training to all three British Armed Forces. It is based at RAF Brize Norton in Oxfordshire.

It was formed at RAF Ringway, now Manchester Airport, on 21 June 1940 as the Central Landing School and from 1 October 1940 it was designated as the Parachute Training Squadron of the Central Landing Establishment. Following growth in the unit's task, it became an independent unit as the Parachute Training School on 15 February 1942. Following formation of a second school in India, the name No.1 Parachute Training School (No.1 PTS) was adopted on 27 July 1944. In 2009, the School was renamed the Airborne Delivery Wing.

== Motto ==
"Knowledge Dispels Fear"

== History ==
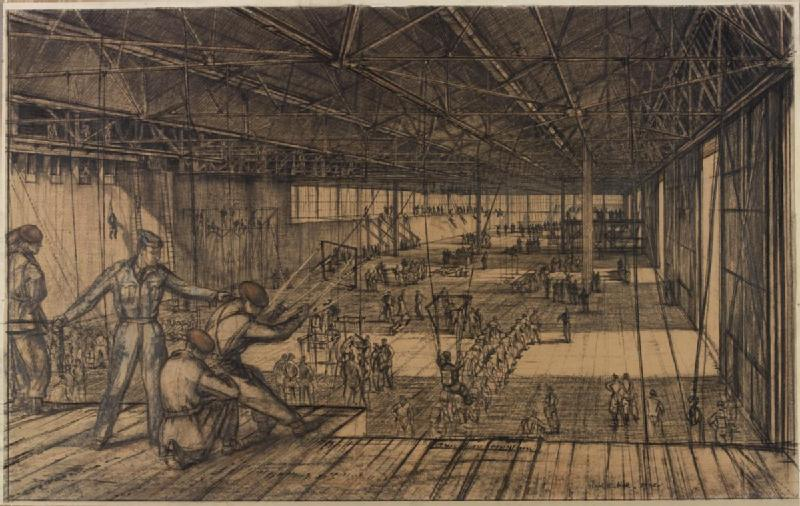
Parachute Training at Ringway (1945) by painter Patrick Hall shows an interior view of paratroopers undergoing training in a hangar at the Parachute Training School at RAF Ringway.

Between June 1940 and early 1946, No.1 PTS provided initial training to all 60,000 allied paratroopers who volunteered or were recruited for that role in Europe. In addition to British troops, men from many nationalities trained to jump at RAF Ringway and nearby Tatton Park including Americans, Belgians, Canadians, Czechs, Dutch, French, Norwegian and Poles. Agents of the Special Operations Executive, both men and women were also given parachute training by No.1 PTS to enable those who were to be dropped into occupied territory to do so safely. To maintain secrecy, these men and women were accommodated in separate secure premises in Bowdon and Styal and were trained in select groups.

No.1 PTS moved from Ringway to RAF Upper Heyford on 28 March 1946and has been based at RAF Brize Norton since moving from RAF Abingdon, where it was based from 1950 to April 1976. Throughout its time in Oxfordshire, No.1 PTS has used the airfield at RAF Weston-on-the-Green, adjacent to the M40 motorway, as its drop zone. Prior to and during the period March 1949 to May 1950 the unit was used additionally for the training of glider pilots. The gliders were Airspeed Horsas, towed by the Dakota transports used for parachute training. (See also article "No 1 Parachute and Glider Training School" of 6 June 2012)

Commanded by a squadron leader from 2005, the School comprised 5 Flights. Military Training Flight is responsible for training all Royal Navy, British Army and Royal Air Force airborne forces in static line training disciplines up to 12 000 ft. Specialist Training Flight is responsible for free fall parachute training and all static line parachuting that requires the use of oxygen. Instructor Training Flight teaches Parachute Jumping Instructors in all parachuting disciplines. Adventurous Training Flight delivers adventurous training courses to all Services through the medium of static line and free fall parachuting.

In 2009 the School was renamed the Airborne Delivery Wing (ADW), commanded by a wing commander.

== Role and operations ==
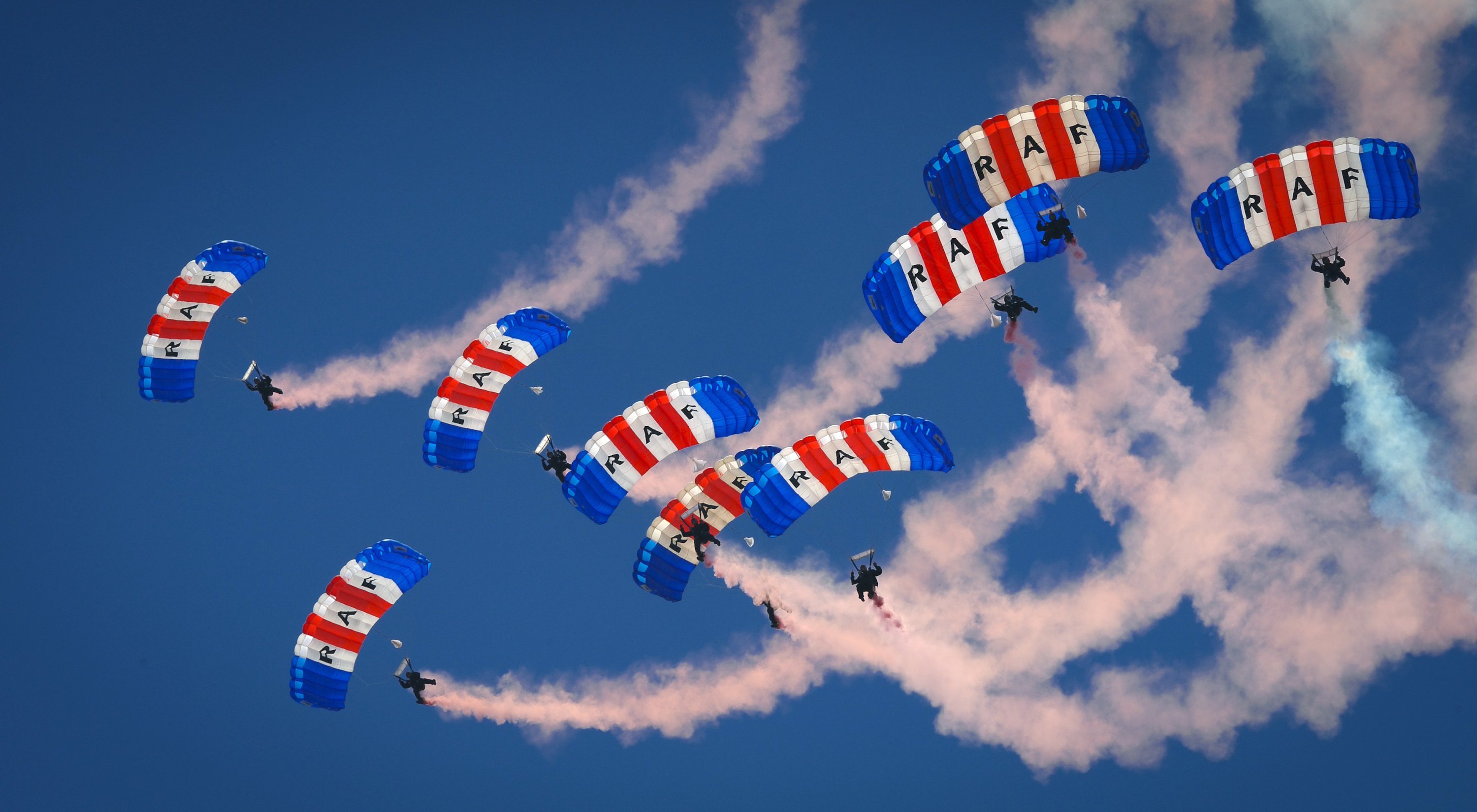
RAF Falcons Parachute Display Team

In 2017, the Airborne Delivery Wing comprised the following Squadrons: Parachute Training Squadron, Performance Development Squadron (included RAF Falcons), HQ and Operations Squadron, Parachute Engineering Squadron and Support Squadron. The RAF Falcons are the only MOD sponsored display team and provide displays around the UK and worldwide and use a Dornier 228 as their dedicated jump platform.

== Memorials ==
A large granite memorial to the existence, personnel and wartime achievements of No.1 PTS is on permanent public display in a small memorial park opposite Olympic House and Terminal 1 at Manchester Airport. Another stone memorial to No.1 PTS is at Tatton Park, located at the western edge of the landing area used in wartime by trainee parachutists.

== See also ==
- RAF Ringway
- Manchester Airport
- Basic Parachute Course
