= RAF Falcons =

Parachute display team of the Royal Air Force

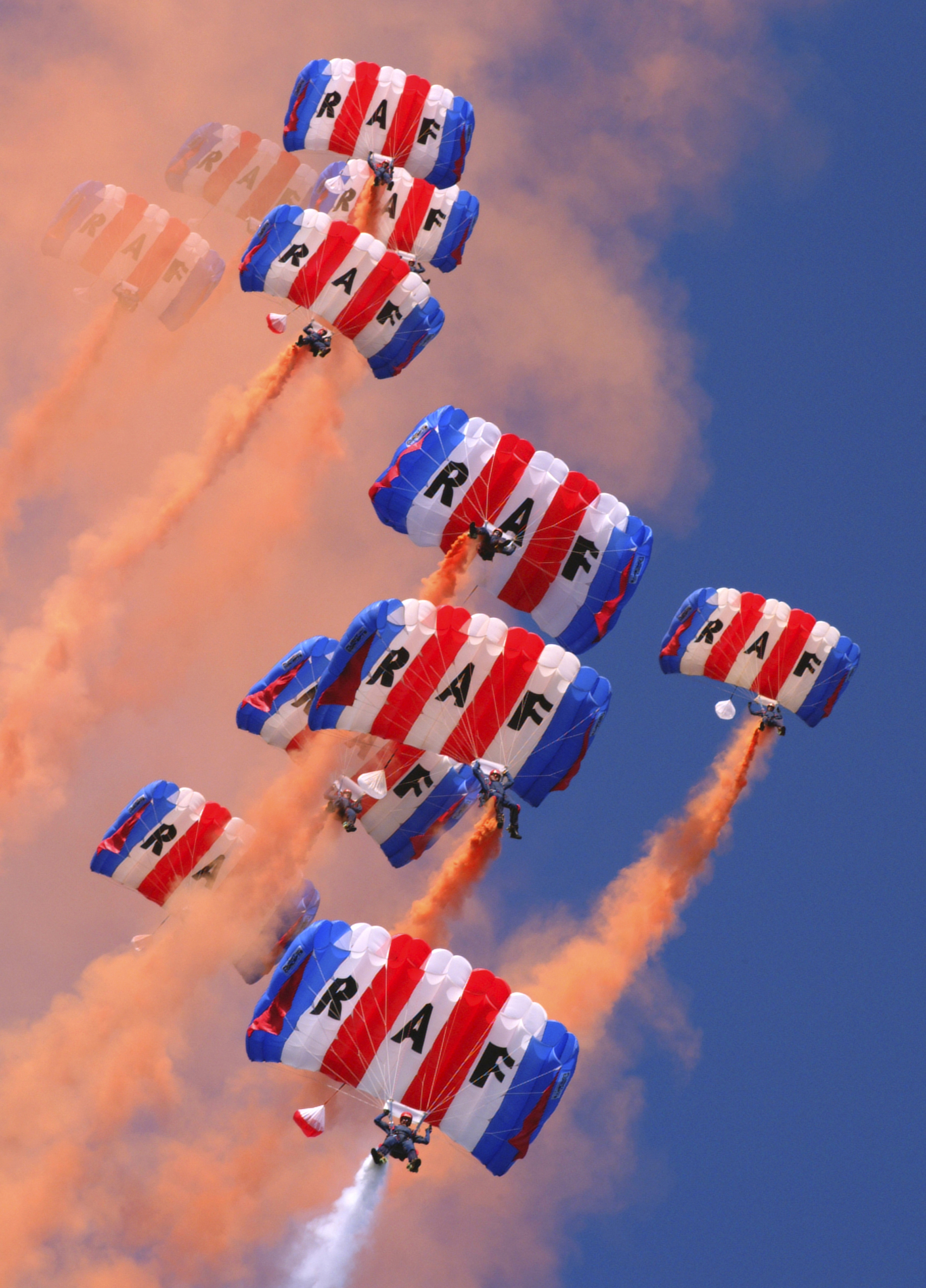
Falcons in 2005

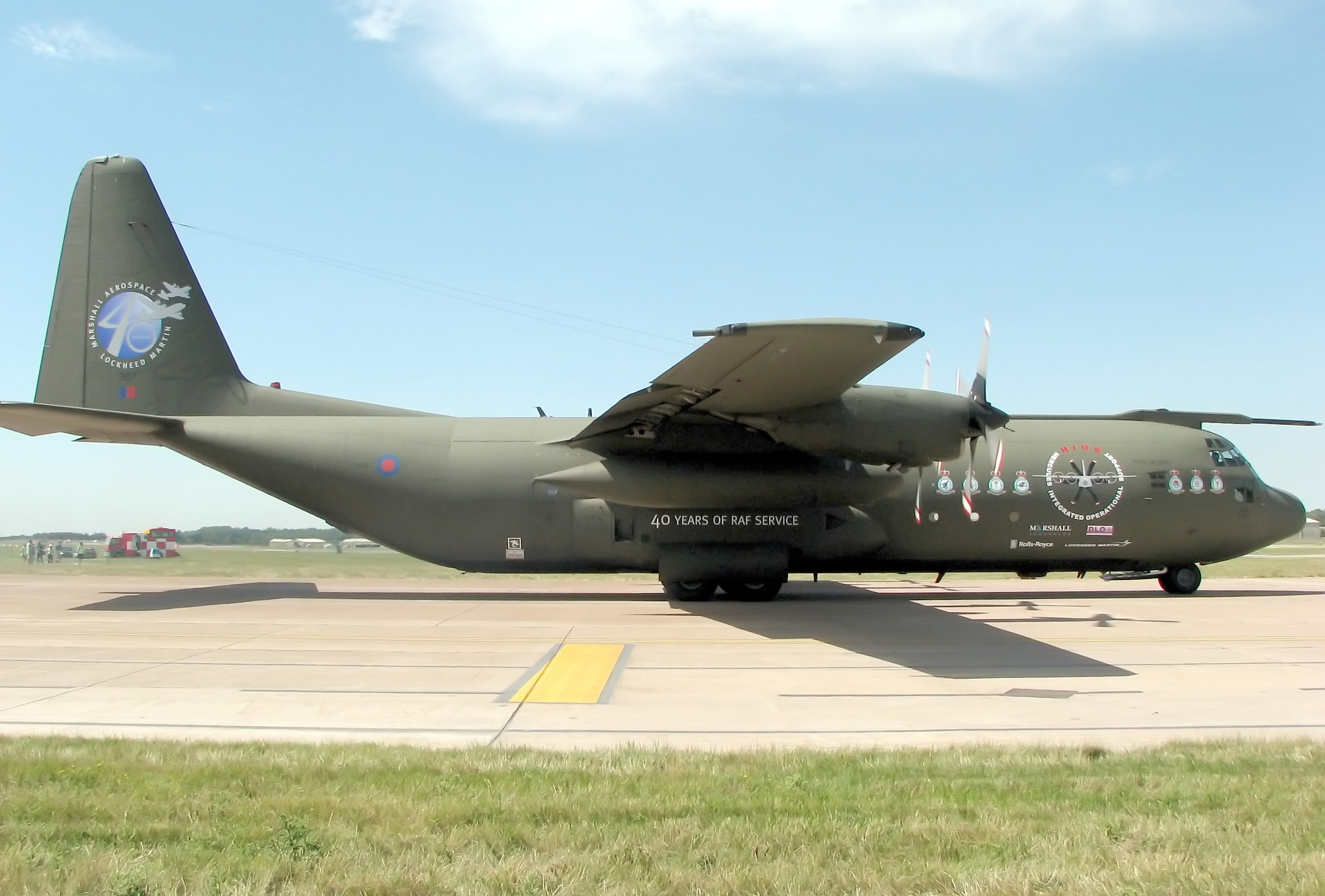
A RAF C-130K similar to the one that the RAF Falcons jump from.

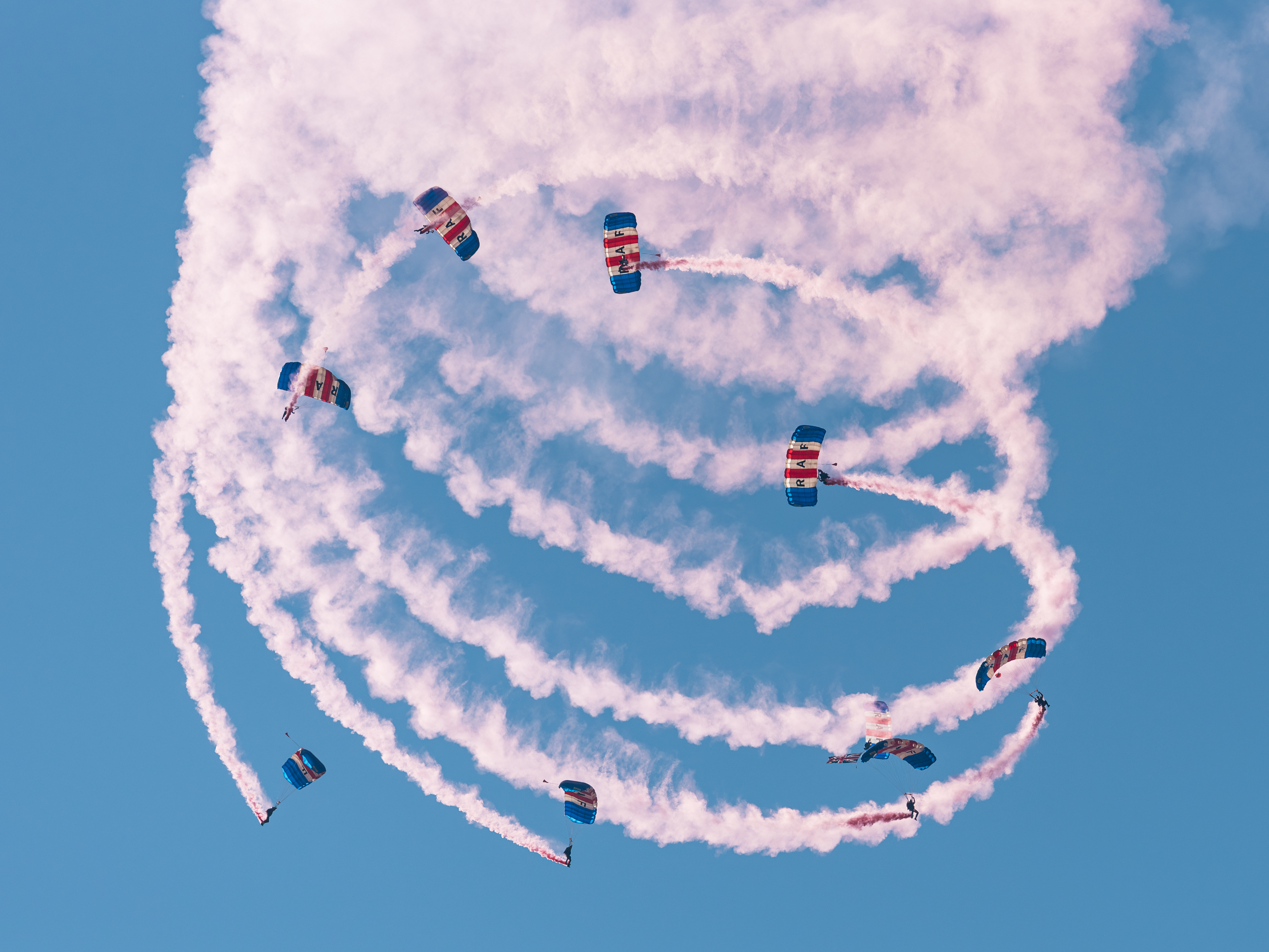
The Falcons in the carousel at the 2024 Royal International Air Tattoo

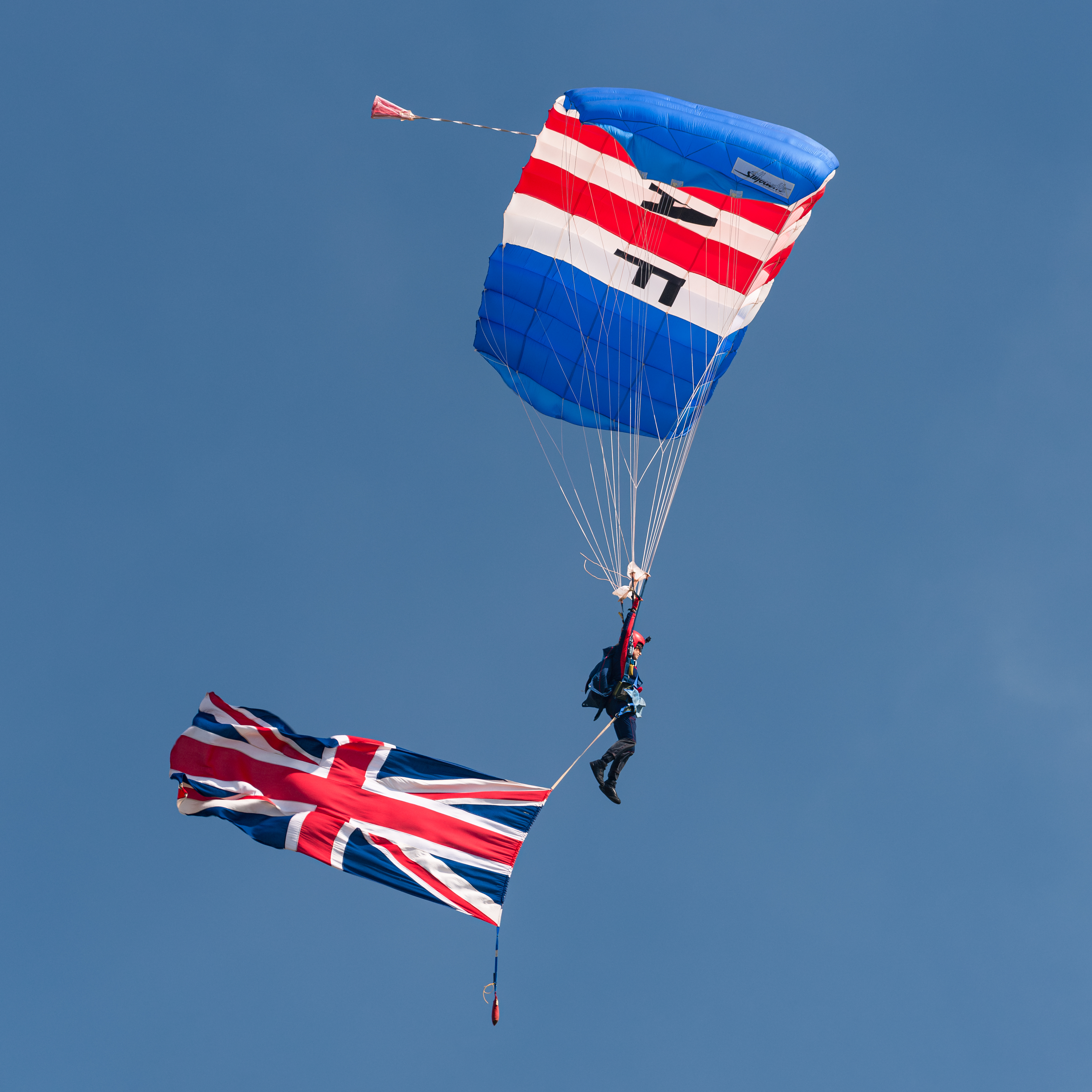
A member of the Falcons towing a Union Jack

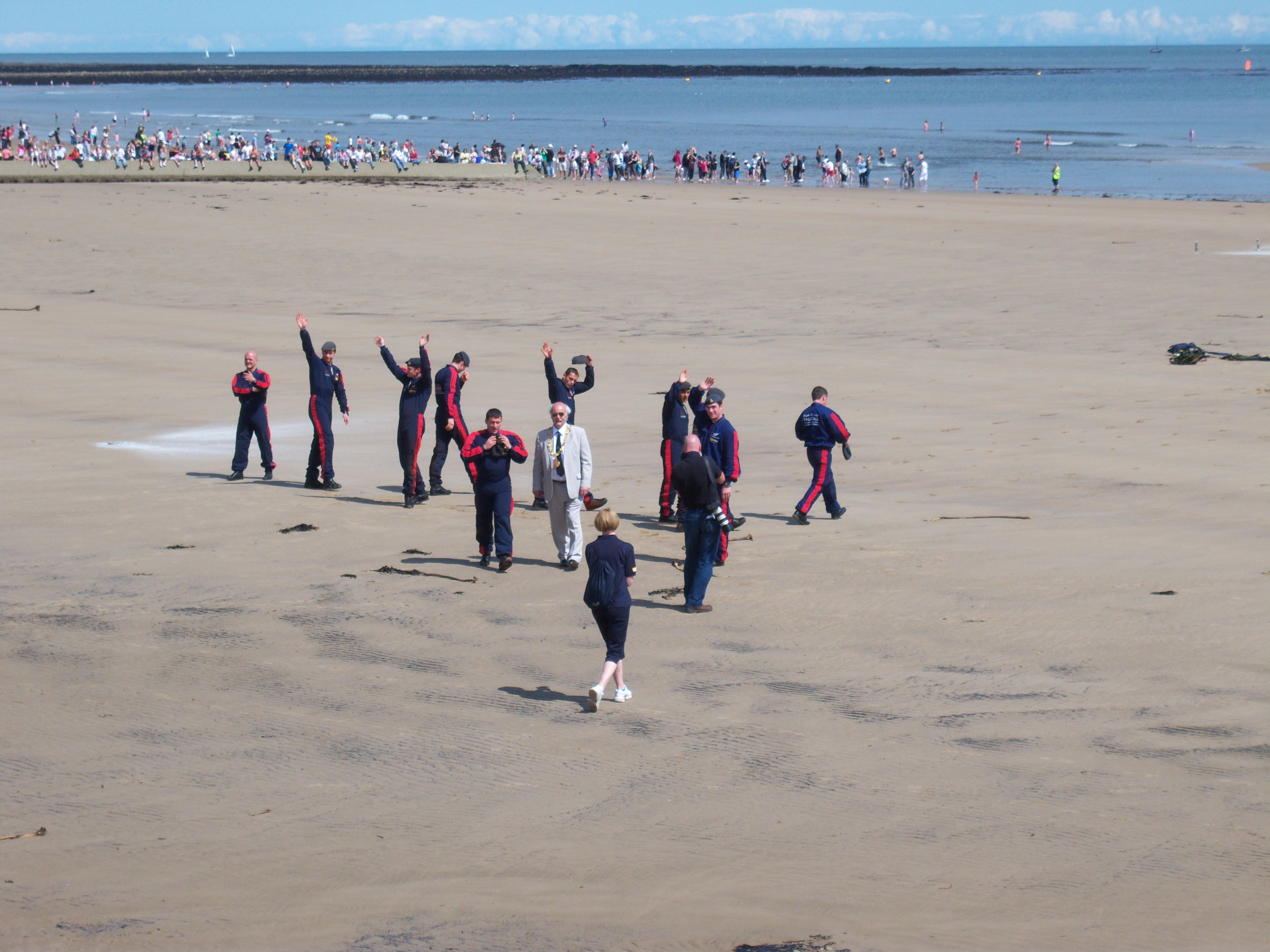
The RAF Falcons having landed at the Sunderland Airshow 2009.

The RAF Falcons are a British military parachute display team. They perform their colourful aerial display at venues nationwide and are renowned for their 11-person non-contact canopy stack display routine, which reaches speeds of up to 120 miles per hour (190 km/h).

== Team ==
The Falcons are based at RAF Brize Norton as part of the Airborne Delivery Wing (previously No. 1 Parachute Training School). Members do a three-year tour with the team.

The display season is from May to September and during the off season the team spend three months in Southern California training for both the Display Season and gaining qualifications appointments after the Falcons.

== Aircraft ==
The RAF Falcons jump from a variety of aircraft depending on aircraft availability and the nature of the display. In the 1960s, they used an Argosy aircraft.

- Lockheed Martin C-130J Hercules
- Boeing CH-47 Chinook
- Aérospatiale HC2 Puma
- Douglas C-47 Dakota
- Dornier 228
- Airbus A400M
- C-17

== History ==
A team of six men, nicknamed the Big Six, from No. 1 Parachute Training School was formed in 1961 at the school's base which at that time was RAF Abingdon. The Big Six were the first to jump from large military aircraft such as the Blackburn Beverley - a feat previously thought impossible on the premise that anybody trying to exit from the ramp would be sucked back by the air turbulence. A popular attraction at air displays, the team was doubled in size and in 1965 was adopted by the RAF as their official display team, and named The Falcons.

In 1967 the team set a British record with a six-man link above the el Adem desert in North Africa. As part of the RAF's 50th anniversary display in 1968 the Falcons performed before the Queen for the first time.

The Lockheed C-130 Hercules aircraft was introduced for Falcons displays in 1970, and the team subsequently set a new British record with an eight-man star. They performed before the Queen again in the early 1970s and for a third time in 1977. The following year, the Strato Cloud ram air parachute was introduced, replacing the Para Commander parachute that had been used since 1965. The Falcons performed in front of the then Prince of Wales, and made their first team display into central London in 1979.

The Falcons' first use of helmet mounted video took place in 1981. Two years later, another new parachute was introduced; the GQ236 ram air parachute. The Falcons opened the Royal Tournament in 1983 by jumping into Horse Guards Parade. In 1986, the Falcons made their first night descent in the UK, at the Officers' Mess at RAF Brize Norton. In August 2001, the team set a new world record for the highest formation jump, when they exited their aircraft at 25,000 feet (7,600 m), above Elvington airfield in North Yorkshire.
