= Boulton Paul P.116 =

Basic trainers designed by Boulton Paul Aircraft

General information
- Type: Two-seat Trainer
- Manufacturer: Boulton Paul Aircraft
- Designer: John Dudley North
- Status: Cancelled before completion of first prototype

The Boulton Paul P.115 and Boulton Paul P.116 were basic trainers designed by Boulton Paul Aircraft to meet Air Ministry Specification T.16/48.

== Variants ==
Data from:Boulton Paul aircraft since 1915

P.115
Designed to Spec T.16/48, the P.115 was to have been powered by an Armstrong Siddeley Cheetah seven-cylinder radial engine, to replace the Percival Prentice. Boulton Paul drew up an alternative engine choice, using the new de Havilland Gipsy Queen 71 which was rated at 400 hp (300 kW), geared and supercharged. The P.115 would have had a top speed of 139 kn (160 mph; 257 km/h) and cruising speed of 122 kn (140 mph; 226 km/h), at 5,000 ft (1,500 m), climbing to 10,000 ft (3,000 m) in 10 minutes.

P.116
Boulton Paul also submitted the P.116 for T.16/48, powered by a supercharged 295 hp (220 kW) de Havilland Gipsy Queen 50.

The Percival Provost won the order for trainers to spec. T.16/48, after competitive trials with the Handley Page H.P.R.2

== Specifications (P.116 estimated) ==
Data from Boulton Paul aircraft since 1915.

General characteristics

- Crew: 2
- Powerplant: 1 × de Havilland Gipsy Queen 50 6-cylinder air-cooled inverted in-line piston engine, 295 hp (220 kW)

Performance

- Maximum speed: 134 kn (154 mph, 248 km/h) at 5,000 ft (1,500 m)
- Cruise speed: 118 kn (136 mph, 219 km/h) at 5,000 ft (1,500 m)
- Time to altitude: 10,000 ft (3,000 m) in 13 minutes 30 seconds

== See also ==
Related development

- Boulton Paul Balliol
- Boulton Paul P.112

Aircraft of comparable role, configuration, and era

- CAC Winjeel
- Fiat G.49
- Handley-Page HPR.2
- Percival Provost
