= No. 288 Squadron RAF =

- Active: 18 November 1941 – 15 June 1946; 16 March 1953 – 30 September 1957
- Country: United Kingdom
- Branch: Royal Air Force
- Motto: Honour through deeds

Insignia
- Squadron Badge: A running stag
- Squadron Code: RP (November 1941 –June 1946)

No. 288 Squadron RAF was a Royal Air Force Squadron formed as an anti-aircraft co-operation unit in World War II.

== History ==
=== Formation in World War II ===
The squadron formed at RAF Digby on 17 November 1941 and was equipped with Lysanders, Blenheims and Hurricanes to provide practice for the anti-aircraft defences in Lincolnshire and Yorkshire by towing targets and conducting simulated attacks. The squadron then moved to Wellingore, Church Fenton and Hutton Cranswick with detachments at other bases and operated other aircraft types before it was disbanded at East Moor on 15 June 1946.

=== Postwar ===
The squadron reformed at Middle Wallop on 15 March 1953 and operated Spitfire and Balliol target aircraft before it disbanded again on 30 September 1957.

== Aircraft operated ==
Aircraft operated by No. 288 Squadron RAF
| From | To | Aircraft | Variant |
|---|---|---|---|
| Nov 1941 | Feb 1942 | Bristol Blenheim | IV |
| Nov 1941 | Mar 1942 | Westland Lysander | II, III |
| Nov 1941 | Mar 1942 | Lockheed Hudson | III |
| Nov 1941 | 1944 | Hawker Hurricane | I |
| Mar 1942 | Apr 1943 | Boulton Paul Defiant | I |
| Dec 1942 | June 1946 | Supermarine Spitfire | VB, IX |
| Mar 1943 | May 1945 | Airspeed Oxford | |
| July 1943 | ? | Miles Martinet | |
| Mar 1944 | Nov 1944 | Bristol Beaufighter | VI |
| Mar 1945 | Jun 1946 | Vultee Vengeance | IV |
| Mar 1953 | May 1953 | Supermarine Spitfire | LF 16E |
| Apr 1953 | Sep 1957 | Boulton Paul Balliol | T.2 |
