= P116 =

P116 may refer to:

- ARM Juan Aldama (P116), a patrol boat of the Mexican Navy
- Boulton Paul P.116, a British trainer aircraft
- Papyrus 116, a biblical manuscript
- TCG Koçhisar (P-116), a patrol boat of the Turkish Navy
- P116, a state regional road in Latvia
