= Boulton Paul P.112 =

General information
- Type: Three-seat Trainer
- Manufacturer: Boulton Paul Aircraft
- Designer: John Dudley North
- Status: Cancelled before completion of first prototype
- Number built: 0

The Boulton Paul P.112 was an elementary trainer designed by Boulton Paul Aircraft for the Royal Air Force.

== Design and development ==
The P.112 was developed from the successful Boulton Paul Balliol, an advanced trainer powered by a Rolls-Royce Merlin piston engine, sharing the same fuselage as the Balliol but with new high aspect ratio wings and a non-retractable spatted undercarriage of 15 ft 2 in (4.62 m) track. The trainer was equipped with three seats, similar to the Balliol and looked so like the earlier aircraft that the image in the brochure was actually a retouched Balliol T.1. However, the Royal Air Force preferred the smaller de Havilland Canada DHC-1 Chipmunk to the P.112 and so no production ensued.

== Variants ==
P.112
Baseline design for the elementary trainer, powered by an Alvis Leonides LE.4M
P.112A
The same design equipped with a Pratt & Whitney R-1340 Wasp engine. This and the Balliol T.2A, were the only Boulton Paul aircraft offered with American engines.

== Specifications (P.112) ==
Data from Boulton Paul Aircraft

General characteristics

- Crew: 2
- Capacity: 1 pax or supernumery
- Length: 35 ft 1.5 in (10.706 m)
- Wingspan: 45 ft 9 in (13.94 m)
- Height: 12 ft 6 in (3.81 m)
- Powerplant: 1 × Alvis Leonides LE.4M 9-cylinder air-cooled radial piston engine, 520 hp (390 kW)
- Propellers: 3-bladed constant-speed propeller

Performance

== See also ==
Related development

- Boulton Paul Balliol

Aircraft of comparable role, configuration, and era

- CAC Winjeel
- Fiat G.49
- Piaggio P.150
