= Boulton Paul Aircraft =

Defunct aircraft manufacturer based in Wolverhampton, England

Boulton Paul Aircraft Limited
- Industry: Aerospace, engineering
- Predecessor: Boulton Paul aircraft division
- Founded: 1918
- Defunct: 1961
- Fate: Acquired by Dowty Group.
- Headquarters: Wolverhampton, UK
- Key people: John Dudley North

Boulton Paul Aircraft Ltd was a British aircraft manufacturer that was incorporated in 1934, although its origins in aircraft manufacturing began earlier in 1914 and lasted until 1961. The company mainly built and modified aircraft under contract to other manufacturers, but had a few notable designs of its own, such as the Defiant fighter and the Balliol trainer.

The company's origins date back to an ironmonger's shop founded in 1797 in Norwich. By the early 1900s, Boulton & Paul Ltd was a successful general manufacturing firm with a construction engineering division. It began building aircraft under contract during the First World War before moving into designing and building its own aircraft.

The aircraft building business was sold off - at a low point in the aviation market - from the main construction business in 1934 and then moved to Wolverhampton under its new name Boulton Paul Aircraft Ltd in 1936 to take advantage of skilled local workforce and local government incentives.

By 1961 Boulton Paul Aircraft was a manufacturer of aircraft equipment rather than aircraft; it merged with the Dowty Group.

== History ==
Boulton & Paul started its construction engineering division in 1905.

In 1915, Boulton & Paul began to construct aircraft under contract, including 550 of the Royal Aircraft Factory FE.2b. During the war the company built more Sopwith Camels than any other manufacturer. Success as an aircraft builder led the company to form a design department but none of its resulting aircraft made a significant impact while the war lasted. Boulton Paul's chief aircraft designer was John Dudley North (1893–1968), who joined the company from Austin Motor Company Aircraft Department.

After World War I, Boulton & Paul made their mark with the introduction of powered and enclosed defensive machine gun turrets for bombers. Their Sidestrand twin-engined biplane bomber, which could fly at 140 mph (230 km/h), had an exposed nose turret which was clearly inadequate. The subsequent Overstrand bomber featured the world's first enclosed, power-operated turret, mounting a single Lewis gun and propelled by compressed air. The company licensed a French design of an electro-hydraulic four-gun turret which became a major feature of their future production. In addition to fitting turrets to bombers, Boulton Paul was to install them in fighters.

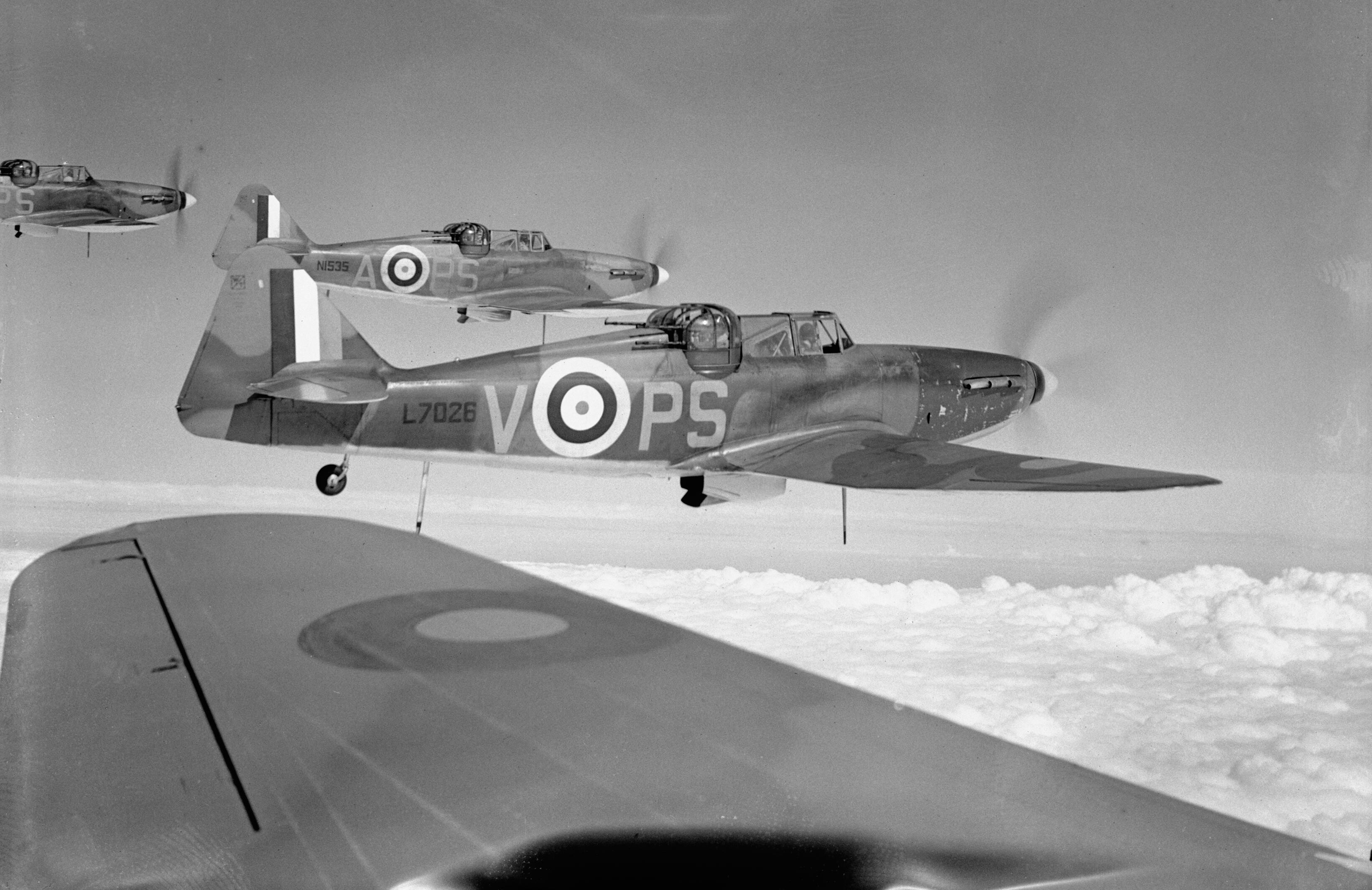
The Boulton Paul Defiant was a "turret fighter", an aircraft type developed for Britain's air defence against enemy bombers

During this period Boulton & Paul continued to operate outside the aircraft industry as well. They manufactured equipment such as machine tools and stationary engines. The latter were also available coupled to a dynamo for powering electric lighting circuits, and were sold under the Electolite brand name.

In 1934, Boulton & Paul sold their "Aircraft Department" which became Boulton Paul Aircraft Ltd. Over the next couple of years a new factory site was built up in Wolverhampton. This gave access to a large skilled workforce on top of the 600 or so employees that left Norwich for Wolverhampton. Even so, Boulton Paul would later set up a training centre in Scotland to bring in extra workers. The first "turret" fighter to be built was some of the Hawker Demon. This was followed by Boulton Paul's most famous aircraft, the Defiant, which was a revolutionary but flawed concept specified by the Air Ministry – a "fast" fighter with no fixed forward armament but a powerful four-gun dorsal turret at a time when most interceptors had only two machine guns. Turret fighters were expected to be able to work together to engage undefended enemy bombers from any aspect, concentrating their fire. In practice, once Germany defeated France in 1940 their high performance but short range fighters were able to escort bombers. The same concept was used for the Defiant's naval equivalent, the Blackburn Roc, which while a design by Blackburn, the detail design was done in BP's drawing office and the aircraft was built wholly by Boulton Paul.

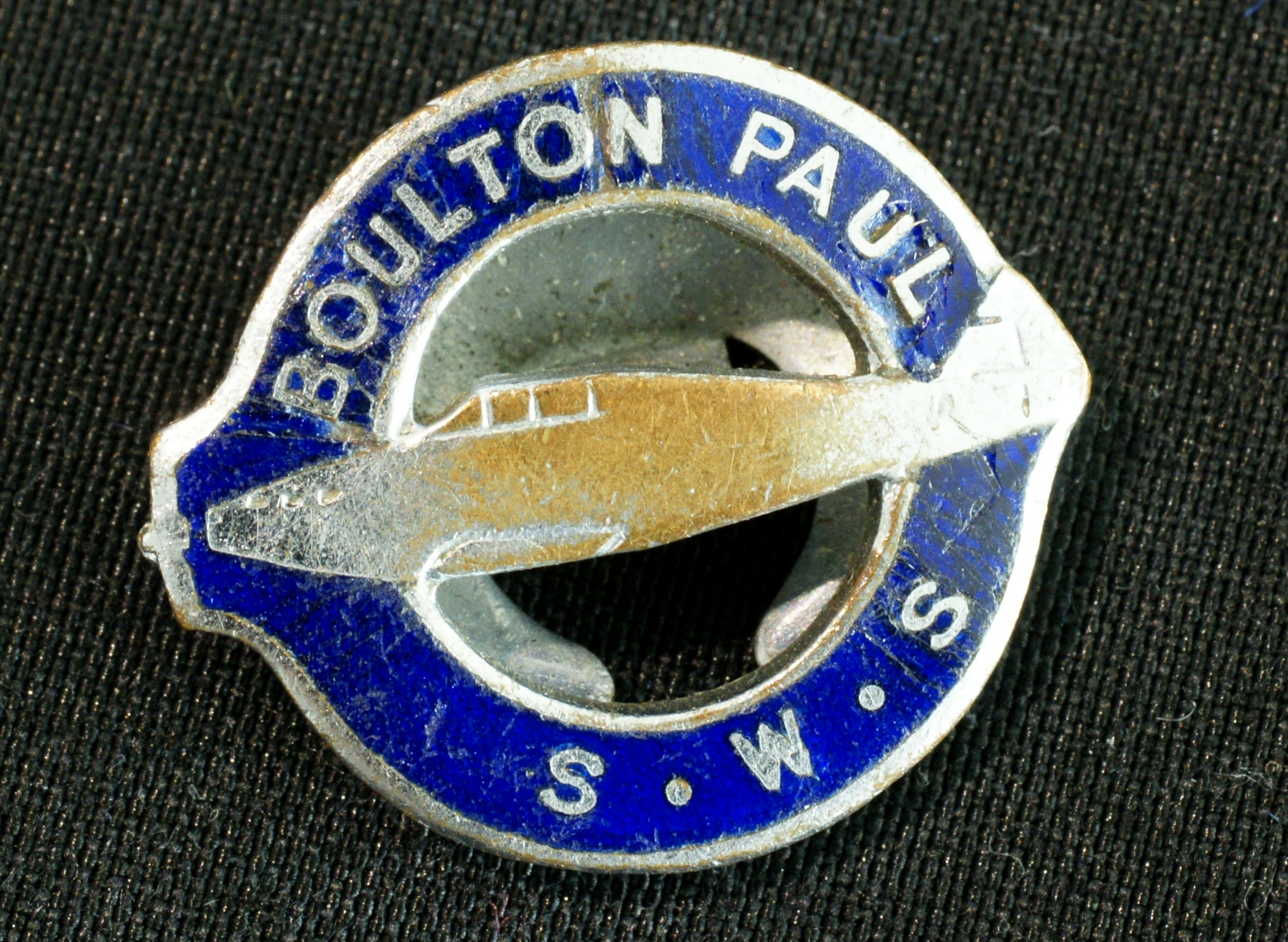
Badge worn by Boulton Paul staff during World War II

Boulton Paul also built the Fairey Barracuda and did conversions of the Vickers Wellington. The only post-war design was the Balliol advanced trainer, of which 229 were built, including 30 as the Sea Balliol deck-landing trainer.

In the jet age, Boulton Paul worked on the English Electric Canberra and de Havilland Vampire. It designed and built a couple of delta-wing jet-engined aircraft for research work and continued to tender designs for official requirements. In 1961 the company was acquired by Dowty Group and was renamed Dowty Boulton Paul Ltd and then Dowty Aerospace.

Following the acquisition of Dowty Aerospace by TI Group in 1992, and the subsequent merger of Smiths Industries and the TI group in 2000, to form Smiths Group, the Wolverhampton factory site was sold again in May 2007 to GE Aviation Systems. Yet again in August 2009 the factory was sold to Moog Inc. but was to move to new premises at the nearby I54 business park. The factory also had an on-site Boulton Paul Museum dedicated to Boulton Paul aircraft and the traditional methods used to manufacture aircraft. The important collection was scheduled to move to Royal Air Force Museum Cosford in Spring 2013. Short video of the move captured April 28,2013.

== Boulton Paul aircraft (including pre 1934 aircraft) ==
First flight date shown

- Boulton Paul Bobolink 1918
- Boulton Paul Bourges 1918
- Boulton Paul P-6 1918
- Boulton Paul Atlantic 1919
- Boulton Paul P.9 1919
- Boulton Paul P.10 1919
- Boulton Paul Bolton 1922
- Boulton & Paul Bugle 1923
- Boulton Paul Bodmin 1924
- Boulton Paul Sidestrand 1926 – bomber
- Boulton Paul Bittern 1927 – night fighter with upward firing guns
- Boulton Paul Partridge 1928 – fighter
- Boulton Paul Phoenix 1929 – low cost aeroplane for personal use
- Boulton Paul P.32 1931 – bomber, not accepted for service
- Boulton Paul Overstrand 1933 – bomber
- Boulton Paul P.64 Mail-Carrier 1933
- Boulton Paul P.71A 1934 – transport derivative of the Mailplane
- Boulton Paul Defiant 1937 – turret fighter
- Boulton Paul P.90 Proposal for a four-engined bomber, to meet Specification B.12/36. Not built.
- Boulton Paul P.92 1941 – fighter/ground attack
- Boulton Paul P.98/P.100 1942 – proposed canard-pushprop design
- Boulton Paul Balliol 1947 – trainer
- Boulton Paul P.111 1950 – delta wing research
- Boulton Paul P.112 1950s – proposed three seat training aircraft, not built
- Boulton Paul P.116 1950s – proposed two seat training aircraft, not built
- Boulton Paul P.117 wing controlled aerodyne
- Boulton Paul P.120 1952 – delta wing research
- Boulton Paul P.130 proposed VTOL aircraft
- Boulton Paul P.132 proposed VTOL aircraft
- Boulton Paul P.134 proposed VTOL aircraft
- Boulton Paul P.135 proposed VTOL aircraft
- Boulton Paul P.136 proposed VTOL aircraft
- Boulton Paul P.137 VTOL research aircraft
- Boulton Paul P.140 proposed VTOL airliner
- Boulton Paul P.141 proposed VTOL airliner
- Boulton Paul P.142 VTOL research aircraft
- Boulton Paul P.143 proposed VTOL airliner
- Boulton Paul P.145 proposed VTOL twin-boom aircraft
- Boulton Paul P.146 proposed VTOL airliner

== Production of other aircraft ==
- Blackburn Roc - 136
- Fairey Barracuda Mk II - 300
- Fairey Barracuda Mk III - 392

== Missiles ==
- UB.109T – Company designation Boulton-Paul P.123 .

== Boulton Paul gun turrets ==
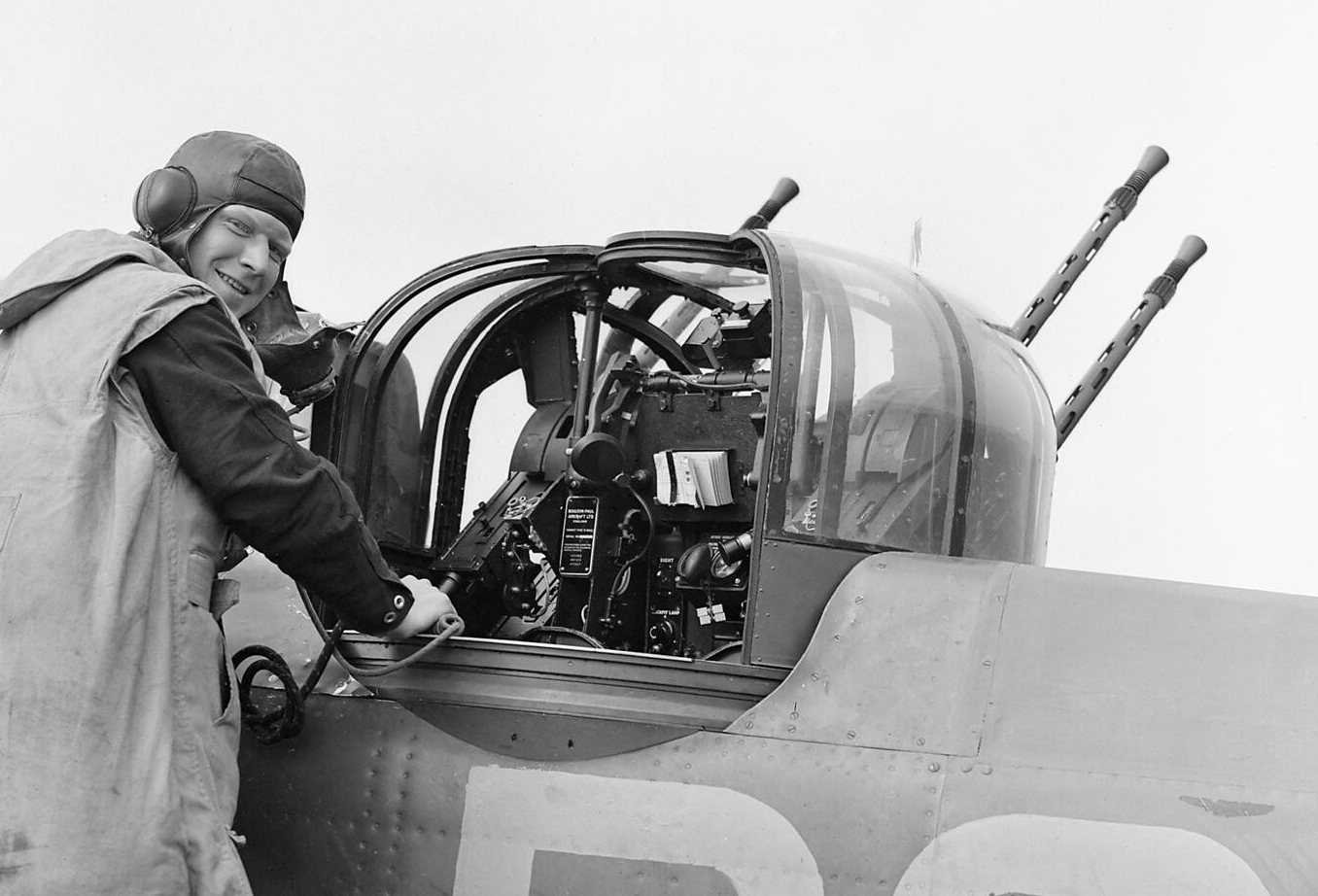
Type A gun turret with its interior visible on a Boulton Paul Defiant Mk I, 1940

Boulton Paul was one of the two innovators of gun turret designs for British aircraft, along with Nash & Thompson; they supplied large numbers of installations for British aircraft. (Note: Although other aircraft manufacturers did design their own turrets, eg Vickers on the early Wellington bomber, for wartime production standardisation on a couple of designs across all aircraft was preferred) Boulton Paul's designs were largely based on originals licensed from the French company Société d'Applications des Machines Motrices (SAMM), while Nash & Thompson designs originated from the firm's co-founder, Archibald Frazer-Nash (and were known by the acronym FN) Boulton Paul's turrets were electro-hydraulic; electric motors in the turret drove hydraulic pumps that powered hydraulic motors and rams. This was more effective than electric motors alone and did not require hydraulic power developed by pumps on the aircraft's engines system used by the Nash & Thompson design. Production was transferred to Joseph Lucas Ltd.

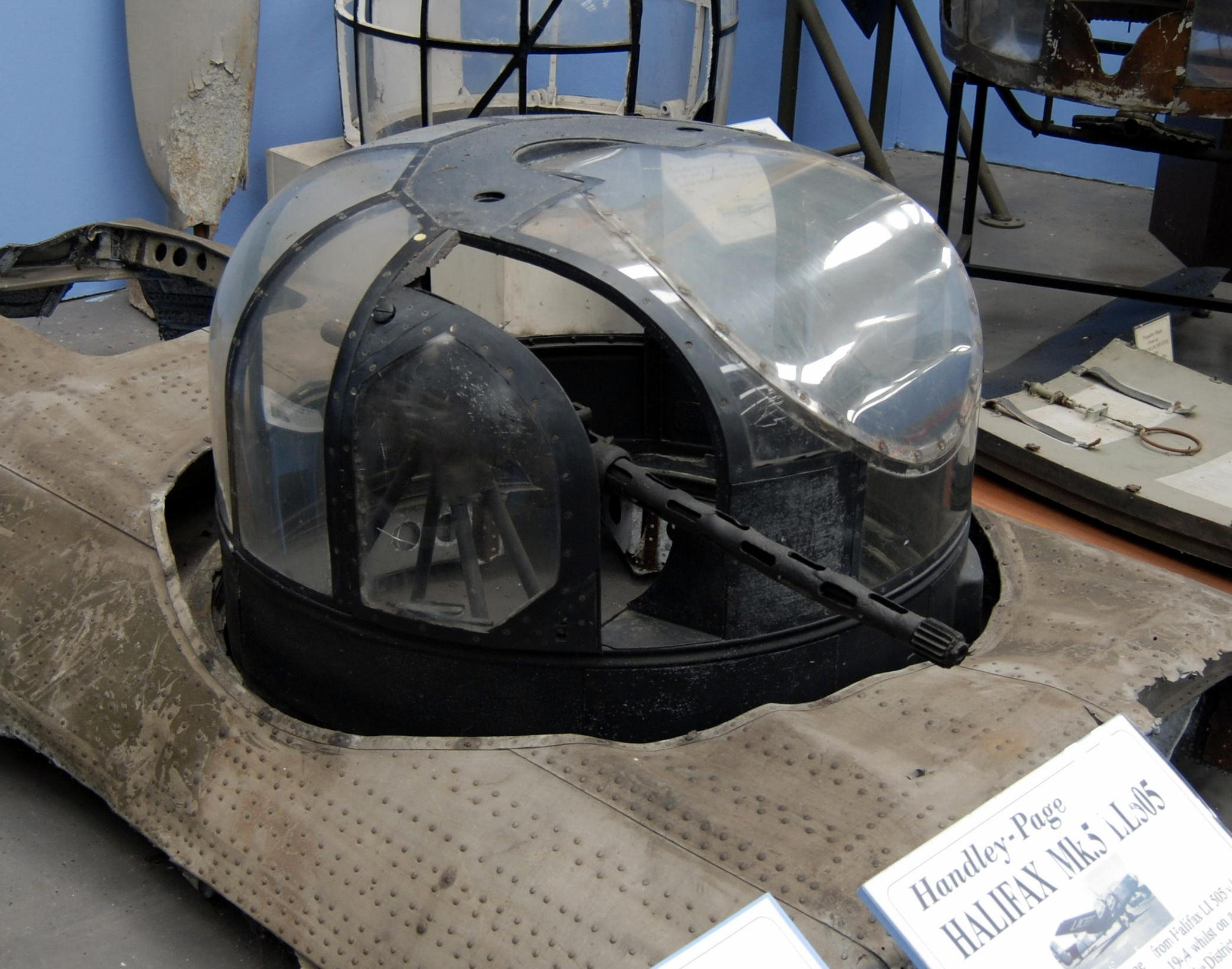
A two-gun dorsal turret from a Handley Page Halifax at the Newark Air Museum

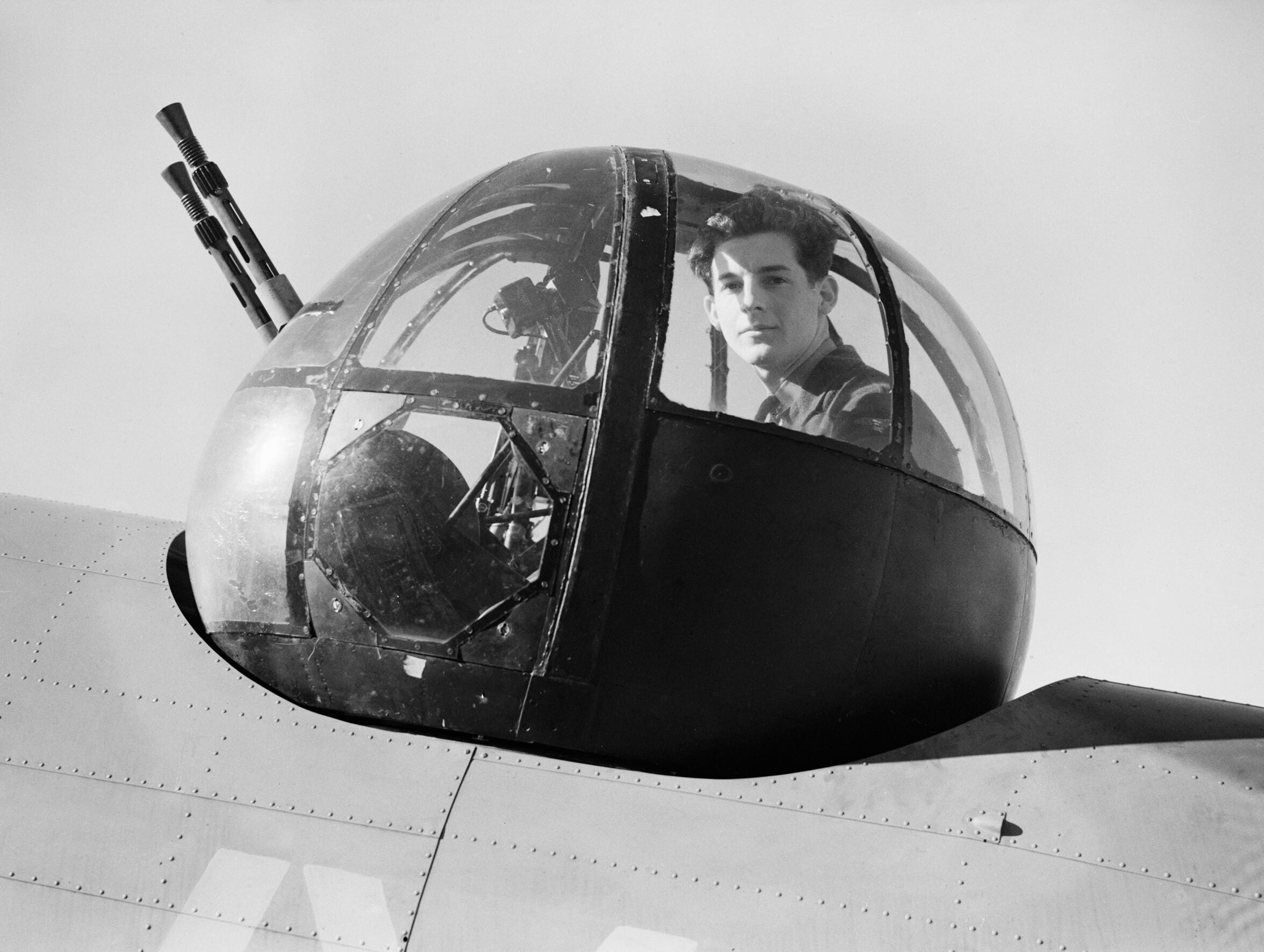
A Type С turret on a Lockheed Hudson

Turret models:

- Type A
  - Mark II used on Boulton Paul Defiant (D) and Blackburn Roc (R)
  - Mark VIII four-gun or two-gun turret, dorsal on Handley Page Halifax
  - Also used on Lockheed Ventura, and for converting Short C and G class flying boats
- Type B
- Type C
  - Mark I, two guns used as nose turret on Halifax
  - Mark II, two guns used as dorsal turret on Halifax
  - Used on Lockheed Hudson
- Type D
  - Two 0.5-in (12.7 mm) guns
  - Used on some Avro Lincoln as tail turret, some fitted with Automatic Gun-Laying Turret radar equipment
- Type E
  - Four .303 (7.7 mm) gun rear turret used on Halifax and some versions of Consolidated B-24 Liberator
- Type K
  - Ventral design, two-gun retractable used on Halifax
- Type N
  - Nose design for Lincoln
- Type R
  - Ventral, two .303 (7.7 mm) guns with periscope sighting

== See also ==
- Mann Egerton
- Matthew Boulton
- Matthew Robinson Boulton

Related lists

- List of aircraft manufacturers
