= Boulton Paul Bittern =

P.31 Bittern
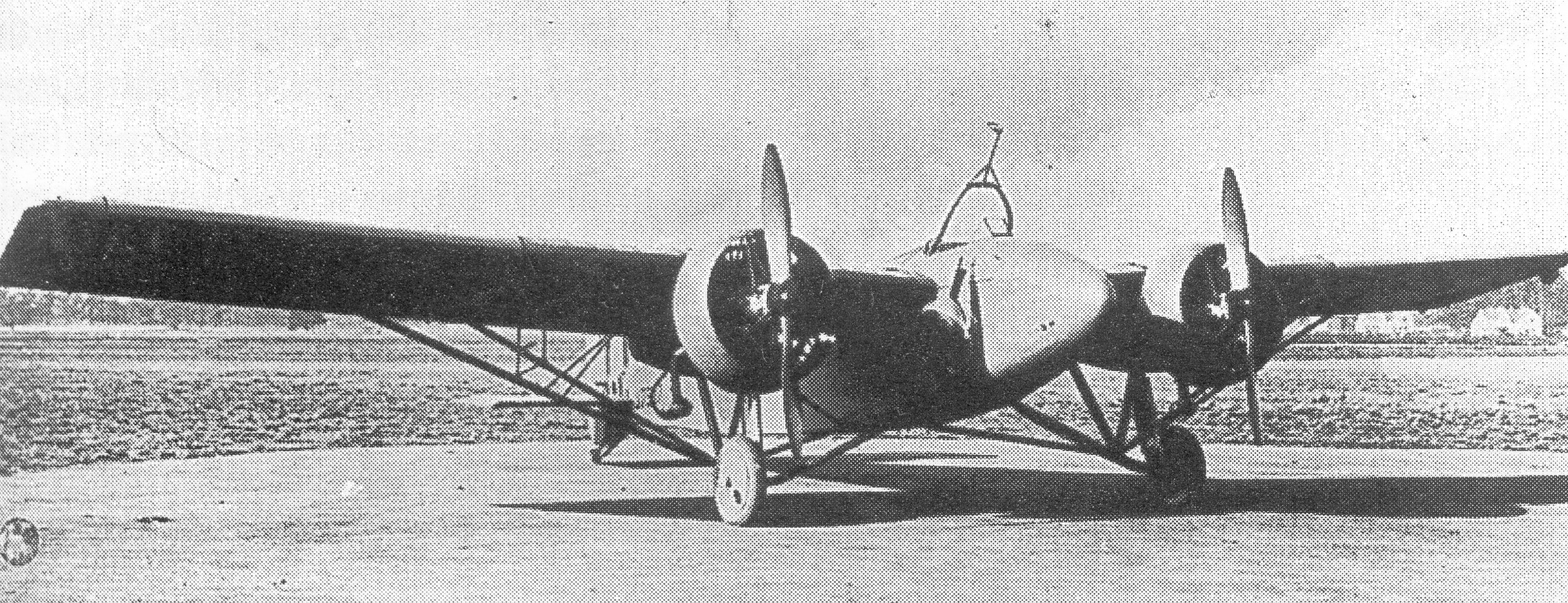
- Second prototype

General information
- Type: Fighter
- Manufacturer: Boulton Paul Limited
- Designer: J.D. North
- Number built: 2

History
- First flight: February 1927

The Boulton Paul Bittern was a 1920s British night-fighter aircraft built by Boulton Paul Limited of Norwich, named after the marsh bird of the same name.

== Design and development ==
Designed to Air Ministry Specification 27/24, which called for a single-seat night fighter for use against enemy bomber aircraft, the Bittern design was unusual for its time in that it was a twin-engined shoulder wing monoplane rather than a single-engine biplane.

Two prototypes were built. The first was a cantilever wing design with the engines - 214 hp Armstrong-Siddeley Lynx - on the leading edge of the wing. However initial trials showed that the wing was too flexible and so wing struts were added fixed between the bottom of the fuselage and the engine installations. However this added weight and drag with a commensurate effect on performance. The second prototype had the engines suspended from the wings on the struts.

The first prototype had two fixed .303 in (7.7 mm) Vickers machine guns mounted on the fuselage sides. In the second the guns were changed from Vickers to Lewis guns mounted in swiveling barbettes on fuselage. These could be angled from 0-45° upwards so the fighter could attack bombers from below without having to put the aircraft into a climb. The wingspan of the second prototype was increased by about 5 ft (1.5 m).

Both were finished in dark green with "night black" undersides for their role as "Anti-Bomber Formation Fighters". The first prototype carried out full performance and armament trials at Martlesham Heath from March 1927; the second went through the same tests in April 1928. The A&AEE reports were favourable except that the top speed - 145 mph - was rather slow. More trials were carried out before they were returned to Boulton & Paul. They were flown by the manufacturer for a while longer before being broken up.

During testing performance was so poor that further development was abandoned.

== Specifications (P.31 Bittern J7936) ==
Data from Boulton Paul Aircraft since 1915.

General characteristics

- Length: 32 ft 4 in (9.86 m)
- Wingspan: 41 ft 0 in (12.50 m)
- Empty weight: 3,215 lb (1,458 kg)
- Gross weight: 4,500 lb (2,041 kg)
- Powerplant: 2 × Armstrong Siddeley Lynx 7-cyl. air-cooled radial piston engine, 230 hp (170 kW) each

Performance

- Maximum speed: 145 mph (233 km/h, 126 kn) (J7936) 152 mph (245 km/h) (J7937)
- Endurance: 3 3/4 hours

Armament

- Guns:
- 2 x fixed forward-firing 0.303 in (7.70 mm) Vickers machine-guns (J7936)
- 2 x two 0.303 in (7.70 mm) Lewis machine-guns in revolving barbettes either side of the nose (J7937).
- Night landing flares under the fuselage

== See also ==
Related lists

- List of fighter aircraft
