= Boulton Paul Defiant =

WWII-era British Royal Air Force interceptor aircraft

Defiant
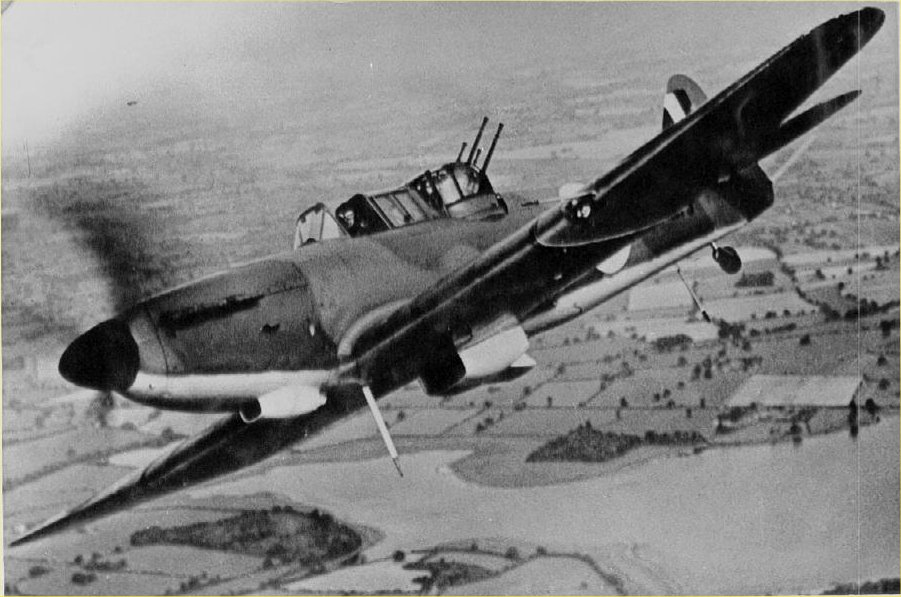
- Boulton Paul Defiant Mk I

General information
- Type: Two-seat fighter, night fighter, trainer, target tug
- Manufacturer: Boulton Paul Aircraft
- Designer: John Dudley North
- Status: Retired
- Primary users: Royal Air Force Royal Australian Air Force; Royal Canadian Air Force; Polish Air Force
- Number built: 1,064

History
- Introduction date: December 1939
- First flight: 11 August 1937

The Boulton Paul Defiant is a British interceptor aircraft that served with the Royal Air Force (RAF) during World War II. The Defiant was designed and built by Boulton Paul Aircraft as a "turret fighter" to meet the RAF requirement for day and night fighters that could concentrate their firepower on enemy bombers which were not expected to have fighter escorts due to the distance from Germany to the United Kingdom. The Defiant had all its armament in a dorsal turret offering the ability to fire in most directions. The same principle was used in the Royal Navy's Blackburn Roc which was also built by Boulton Paul.

In combat, the Defiant was found to be effective at destroying unescorted bombers, the role it was designed for, but was vulnerable to the Luftwaffe's more manoeuvrable, single-seat Messerschmitt Bf 109 fighters operating from bases in Northern France, allowing them to escort bombers to London, although with fuel for only ten minutes of flying time there. The Defiant had been designed only to destroy unescorted bombers by means of beam or ventral attacks, and had no forward-firing armament; it proved to be very vulnerable to frontal attacks by fighters in daylight combat. It was withdrawn from daytime operations for use as a night fighter, and found success in combination with the use of aircraft interception radar (A.I.) to locate the enemy. It eventually equipped thirteen squadrons in this role, compared to just two squadrons as a day-fighter, though this was mainly due to slow initial production. In mid-1942 it was replaced by better-performing night fighters, the Bristol Beaufighter and de Havilland Mosquito. The Defiant continued to find use in gunnery training, target towing, electronic countermeasures and air-sea rescue. Among RAF pilots it had the nickname "Daffy".

== Development ==
=== Origins ===
During the 1930s, the increasing speed of military aircraft posed a particular challenge to anti-aircraft defences. Advances in aircraft design achieved during the 1920s and 1930s had resulted in a generation of multi-engined monoplane bombers that were substantially faster than their contemporary single-engined biplane fighters then in service. The RAF came to believe that its new generation of turret-armed bombers, such as the Vickers Wellington, would be capable of readily penetrating enemy airspace and of defending themselves without any accompanying fighter escort, but also recognised that the bombers of other European air forces, such as the Luftwaffe, would similarly be able to penetrate British airspace with impunity.

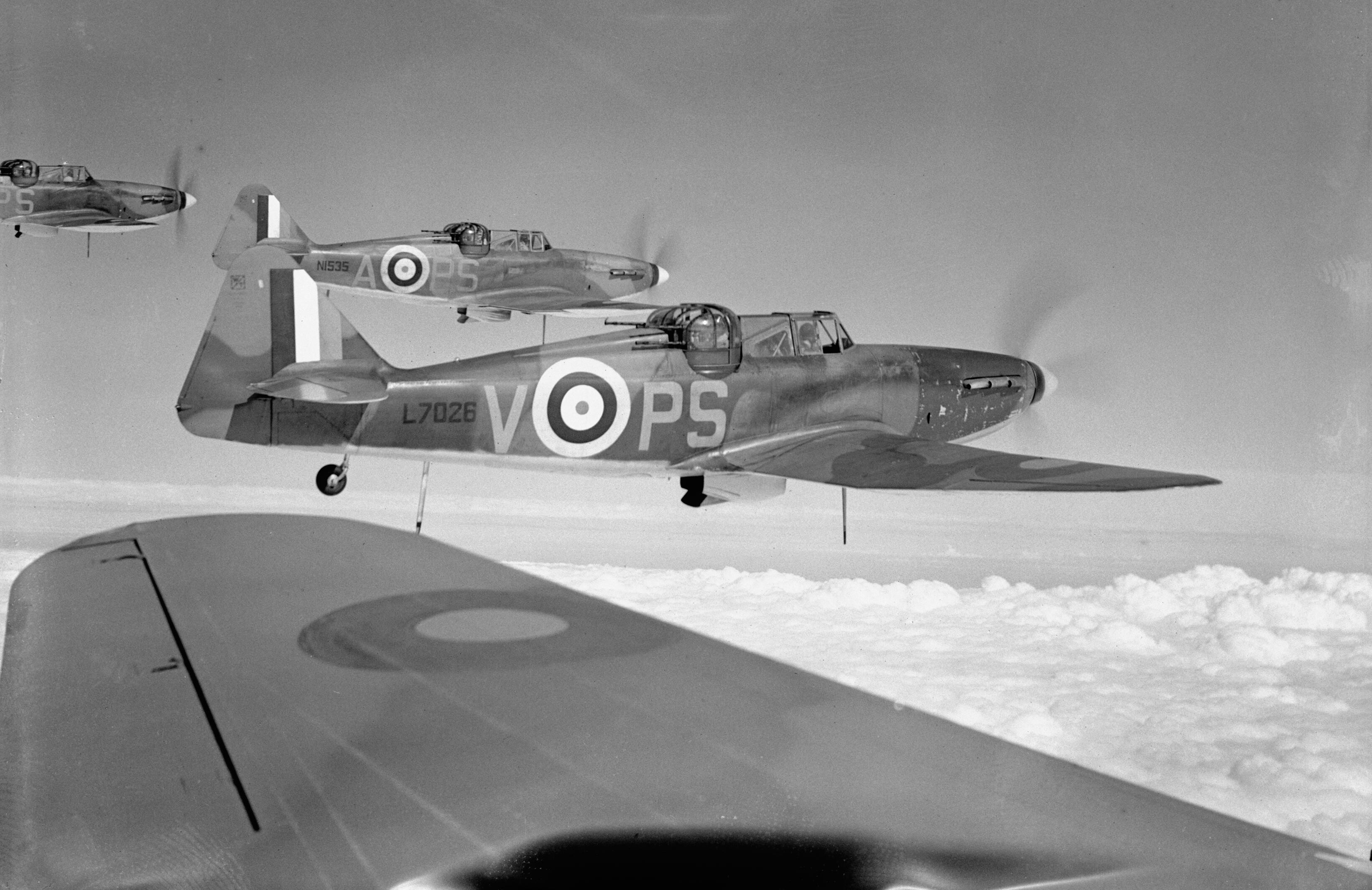
Defiants of No. 264 Squadron in 1940.

During 1935, the concept of a turret-armed defensive fighter to counter the bomber threat emerged during a time in which the RAF anticipated having to defend Great Britain against massed formations of unescorted enemy bombers. The RAF did not expect bombers to be escorted by fighters because fighters would not have the range to reach the UK from Germany. In theory, turret-armed fighters would approach an enemy bomber from below or from the side and coordinate their fire. The separation of the tasks of flying the aircraft and firing the guns would allow the pilot to concentrate on putting the fighter into the best position for the gunner to engage the enemy. However, manually-traversed turrets were viewed as increasingly inadequate to effectively respond to ever-faster hostile aircraft, thus there was considerable interest in using a power-augmented turret.

The earlier Hawker Demon biplane had tested the concept with 59 of the fighters, which had been manufactured by Boulton Paul under a sub-contract, having been equipped with a hydraulically-powered rear turret, while a number of aircraft already built were also converted as such. Boulton Paul and its managing director John Dudley North had gained considerable experience with defensive turrets from producing several earlier aircraft, including the Boulton Paul Overstrand bomber, and had devised a four-gun power-operated turret, the concept and development work of which would later be a core part of the Defiant design. Boulton Paul had acquired a four-gun powered turret from the French SAMM company in 1935.

In April 1935, the Air Ministry released Specification F.9/35, which required a two-seater day and night "turret fighter" capable of 290 miles per hour (470 km/h) at 15,000 feet (4,600 m). The aircraft was to feature a clean design, concentrating its armament within a power-operated turret, and the accepted performance was to be only slightly beneath that of other emergent fighter designs of the period, along with a sufficient fuel capacity to allow it to perform standing patrols. In particular, the powered turret was to offer considerable flexibility, possessing both a 360-degree upper hemisphere field of fire and the ability to engage enemy bombers from a range of quarters, including below the aircraft itself. Specification F.9/35 had followed the earlier Specification F.5/33, which had sought a pusher design combined with a forward-set turret; F.5/33 had been abandoned as the proposals had offered little in terms of performance gains over existing fighters, and the corresponding Armstrong Whitworth AW.34 design which had been ordered was not completed.

F.5/35 was issued to British manufacturers in June 1935. Seven responded to the tender: Armstrong Whitworth (twin-engines, based on the AW.34), Boulton and Paul (P.82), Bristol (Type 147), Fairey, Gloster, Hawker, and Supermarine (Type 305). Vickers did start on a design but did not provide it to the Air Ministry In September 1935 the Air Ministry picked Hawker, Boulton Paul and Armstrong Whitworth designs as the top three (in decreasing order); Gloster and Bristol were rejected due to their turret designs. The Air Ministry wanted several designs investigated and the production of two prototypes of each. To get this large number of aircraft, HM Treasury had to approve the expenditure above that already allocated. Seven prototypes were ordered - one from Armstrong Whitworth, two each from Fairey, Hawker and Boulton Paul - but only the two Defiant prototypes and one Hawker were completed.

=== P.82 ===
Boulton Paul, having been focused on turret-equipped aircraft for some time, made a submission to Specification F.9/35 with the company designation of P.82. The proposed fighter was similar in size and appearance to the more conventional Hawker Hurricane, differing in weight primarily due to the use of turret-based armaments. The central feature of the P.82 was its four-gun turret, based on a design by French aviation company Société d'applications des machines motrices (SAMM), which had been licensed by Boulton Paul for use in the earlier Boulton Paul Sidestrand bomber, eventually installed in the "follow-up" design, the Boulton Paul Overstrand and in the Blackburn Roc naval fighter. The 'Type A' turret was an electro-hydraulically powered "drop-in" unit, with crank-operated mechanical backup. Small bombs could be housed in recesses in the outer wing. Some of the development work from the company's earlier B.1/35 tender was carried over into the P.82.

In 1936, Boulton Paul commenced assembly on the first P.82 prototype, K8310, at their new Wolverhampton facility (Note: Boulton & Paul Ltd had turned their aircraft division into a separate company which then moved from Norwich to Wolverhampton in 1936 to take advantage of the availability of skilled workers in the area); an order for a second prototype, K8620, was received by the following year. In 1937, the first P.82 prototype, K8310, was rolled out. Furnished with a 1,030 hp (768 kW) Rolls-Royce Merlin I and initially without turret, the aircraft bore a great resemblance to the contemporary Hawker Hurricane, although it was at least 1,500 pounds (680 kg) heavier. On 11 August 1937, K8310, which had recently received the name Defiant, conducted its maiden flight. This initial flight, still without the turret, piloted by Boulton Paul's chief test pilot Cecil Feather, took place nearly a year ahead of the rival Hotspur. Official acceptance trials did not commence until nine months later. On 30 July 1939, the second prototype, K8620, equipped with a Merlin II engine and a full turret, conducted its first flight. K8620 had received various modifications over the first prototype, such as telescopic radio masts and revisions to the canopy and to the undercarriage fairing plates; implementing these improvements had incurred delays to the completion of the second prototype.

Production orders had been prepared for the Hotspur, the initial front-running submission but Boulton Paul's turret design had gained the attention of the Air Ministry. Hawker's progress on the project had been delayed by their commitments on other aircraft programs including the more conventional Hurricane; thus the prototype Hotspur, K8309, did not conduct its maiden flight until 14 June 1938. On 28 April 1937, an initial production order for 87 aircraft was received by Boulton Paul for the P.82; as this was prior to the first flight of the prototype, the aircraft had effectively been ordered 'off the drawing board'. The order for the rival Hotspur was cancelled in 1938.

Completing its acceptance tests with the turret installed, the Defiant attained a top speed of 302 miles per hour (486 km/h) and subsequently was declared the victor of the turret fighter competition. Flight trials had revealed the aircraft to possess positive flight characteristics and considerable stability, which was of particular value when using the turret. According to aviation author Michael Bowyer, the usefulness of the Defiant had suffered due to the overly long development time for the type, observing that the Defiant's service entry was delayed to such an extent that only three production aircraft had reached the RAF, and these were only for trial purposes, by the outbreak of the Second World War. Due to delays with the type entering production, there were not enough available Defiants to begin standing patrols in 1940, by which point the introduction of not only more advanced fighters but bombers as well had allegedly undermined the usefulness of the type.

=== Production ===
On 30 July 1939, the first production Defiant, L6950, conducted its maiden flight; it commenced official trials with the Aeroplane and Armament Experimental Establishment (A&AEE) in September that year. Apart from some detail changes, the production Defiant Mk I looked similar to the two Defiant prototypes. It was powered by the Rolls-Royce Merlin III engine, which was capable of generating 1,030 hp/768 kW or 1,160 hp/865 kW. (Note: The normal rating used for Battle of Britain Hurricane Mk.Is, Spitfire Mk.Is and Defiants was 1,030 hp (768 kW); from June 1940 supplies of 100 octane fuel from America became available, increasing power.)

By January 1940, over half of the original production batch had been completed. Beyond the initial production order in April 1937, follow-on orders had been issued for the type; in February 1938, an additional 202 Defiant Mk I aircraft were ordered; three months later, another 161 aircraft were ordered. At the same time Boulton Paul were engaged in production of the Blackburn Roc. In December 1939, yet another 150 aircraft were ordered, raising the overall total to 513. In 1940, this rose to 563 Defiant Mk Is on order, while a further 280 were ordered under a rearranged manufacturing plan issued in mid-1940. However, the performance of the Defiant had been determined to be inadequate by this point, which led to manufacturing being sustained principally for economic reasons. A total of 713 Defiant Mk I aircraft were completed.

In response to a service request which sought greater performance, the Defiant Mk II, powered by the 1,260 hp Merlin XX engine, was promptly developed. On 20 July 1940, N1550, the first production Defiant Mk II performed its initial flight. The Mk II featured a pressurised fuel system, additional fuel, an enlarged rudder, a deeper radiator, a modified engine mounting and elongated cowling. Once sufficient numbers of the Merlin XX engine were available, production of the improved variant commenced; in August 1941, the first production deliveries of the Defiant Mk II took place.

The Defiant Mk II was soon paired with the newly developed AI to become more effective night fighter. (Note: Night fighter operations with the Defiant began in June 1940) While initial AI equipment was too heavy and bulky to be practical for equipping smaller aircraft, the improved AI Mk. IV radar was suitably sized for the Defiant; the first such equipped Defiants were introduced in late 1941. Later versions of the AI radar were adopted over time, such as the AI Mk VI. The need for both the Defiant (and the Hurricane) in the night fighter role petered out by 1942 as the larger Bristol Beaufighter became the RAF's primary night fighter type, freeing both aircraft for other duties.

In the search for alternative uses for the Defiant, which included limited service with the RAF Search and Rescue Force and suitability trials for cooperative operations with the British Army, it was determined that Defiant production would continue in order to satisfy a pressing requirement for high speed gunnery targets. A dedicated version of the aircraft, the Defiant TT Mk I, was developed for this purpose; modifications included the removal of the turret, the installation of target-towing equipment, including a target stowage box and a wind-driven winch, and the addition of a winch operator under an enclosed canopy. In January 1942, the prototype Defiant TT Mk I, DR863, conducted its maiden flight; fighter production was phased out shortly thereafter.

The last Defiant Mk IIs under construction were completed as TT Mk I aircraft. Dozens of existing Defiant Mk Is would be remanufactured to the similar Defiant TT Mk III standard; roughly 150 of such conversions took place during 1943–1944. So that the type could be used to meet the growing overseas demand for target-towing aircraft, the Defiant was tropicalized, a large portion of which was the installation of large filters underneath the aircraft's nose.

=== P.85 ===
The P.85 was Boulton Paul's tender to Specification O.30/35 for the naval turret fighter. A version of the Defiant for Fleet Air Arm (FAA), it had leading edge slats and a deeper fuselage, for the lower landing speeds required of carrier aircraft. The engine would be either a Bristol Hercules radial or the Merlin. Despite the P.85's higher estimated top speed, the Blackburn Roc was selected. With Blackburn already busy producing other projects, the detail design and production of the Roc was given to Boulton Paul. Ultimately, the only use of the Defiant within the FAA was its adoption of the target tug version.

=== P.94 ===
The first Defiant prototype had not been fitted with a turret at first and had an impressive top speed. In 1940, Boulton Paul removed the turret from the prototype as a demonstrator for a fixed-gun fighter based on Defiant components. The armament offered was either 12 .303 inches (7.7 mm) Browning machine guns (six per wing) or four 20 millimetres (0.79 in) Hispano cannon in place of eight of the Brownings. The guns could be depressed for ground attack. By that time, the RAF had sufficient quantities of Hawker Hurricanes and Supermarine Spitfires and did not require a new single-seat fighter. With a calculated top speed of about 360 miles per hour (580 km/h) at 21,700 feet (6,600 m) the P.94 was almost as fast as a contemporary Spitfire although less manoeuvrable.

== Design ==
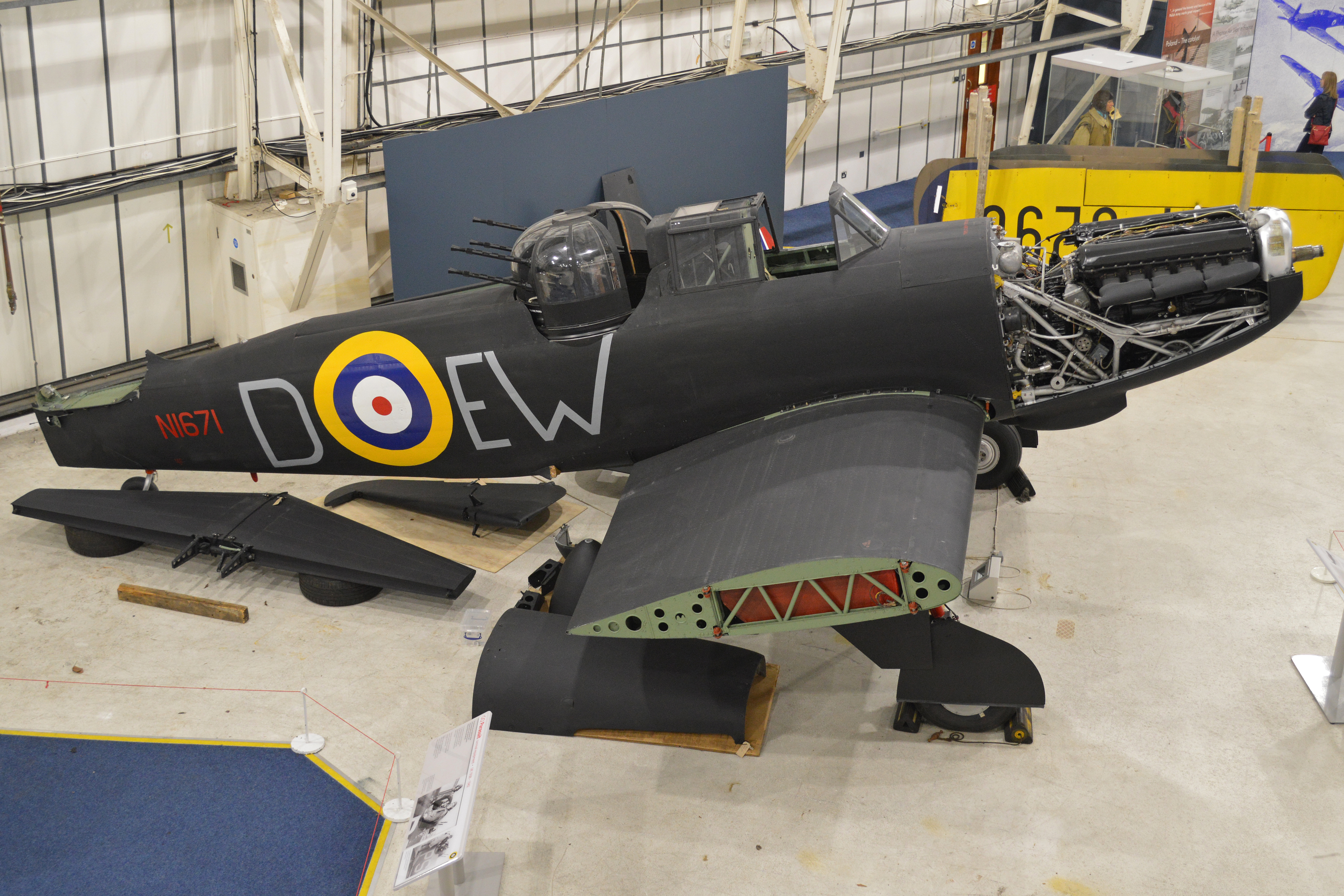
Defiant N1671 from 307 Squadron at the RAF Museum London, partially dismantled, with its tail, engine cowling and outer wing sections removed, 2016

The Defiant was a single-engine interceptor aircraft. It used a monoplane structure which was coupled with main landing gear which retracted into a broad mainplane section. The pilot's cockpit and rear turret were faired into a streamlined upper fuselage section. Tankage for up to 104 imp gal (470 L) of fuel was housed within the wing centre section along with a large ventral radiator that completed the resemblance to the Hawker fighter. The centre section employed a two-spar arrangement, and the wing itself had removable wingtips. The rear fuselage comprised two metal cones connected by a two-foot transitional section and a flat upper deck. The Defiant employed an all-metal stressed skin monocoque structure. The fuselage was built in sections that were subsequently bolted together, a manufacturing method previously used on other Boulton Paul-designed aircraft which they thought made the riveting process easier. It was a relatively clean design and made use of a simple, weight-saving structure.

=== Armament ===
The primary mission of the Defiant was the destruction of incoming enemy bombers. The armament of the aircraft was a powered dorsal turret equipped with four 0.303 Browning machine guns (firing bullets, rather than the more destructive cannon firing explosive shells). Some versions (P.82) could carry a few small bombs. The fuselage was fitted with aerodynamic fairings that helped mitigate the drag of the turret; they were pneumatically powered and automatically raised and lowered into the fuselage so that the turret could rotate freely. The Brownings were electrically fired, and insulated cut-off points in the turret ring prevented the guns firing when they were pointing at the propeller disc or tailplane. The gunner could rotate the turret directly forward and transfer firing control of the guns to the pilot, with the guns firing along each side of the cockpit canopy; this was rarely done as the turret's minimum forward (firing) elevation was 19° and the pilot did not have a gunsight, possibly because the Defiant was outfitted to perform zero deflection shooting, as were several contemporaneous designs arising from Air Ministry specifications.

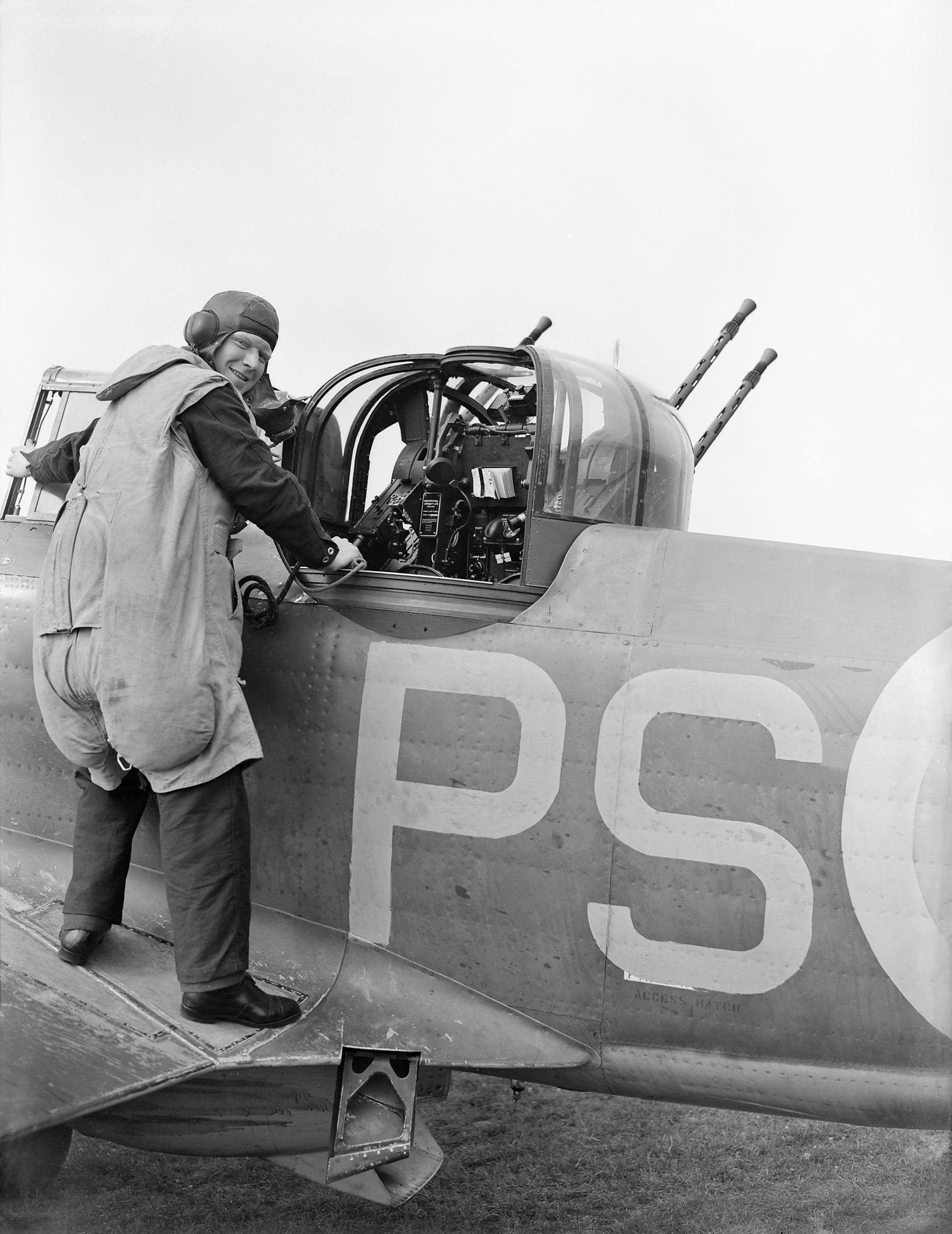
An air-gunner of 264 Squadron wearing a 'GQ Parasuit', or "rhino suit", August 1940

Limitations of the armament were inability of the guns to fire directly forwards in normal operation (the guns could not fire within 16 degrees of the line of flight), and the guns' inability to fire downwards, so the aircraft had to remain below the enemy. This was suitable for attacking bombers from below, but not for dogfighting with fighters. As flying and the guns were operated by different people, there was a need to communicate; the gunner was distracted from his firing by having to direct the pilot over the intercom.

The zero deflection gunnery technique was practised, among others, by British ace Albert Ball using Lewis guns on Foster mounts – which largely eliminated the need for either complex gun sights or aiming-off by eye. An elevation of +19° combined with ballistic properties of .303 Brownings and the Defiant's operational speed made 'line of sight' aiming – as practised by Luftwaffe pilots – a practical proposition. This technique, applied later in the war by Germany as Schräge Musik, seems to have been neither taught nor practised by the RAF. Despite being common knowledge among veteran First World War aircrew, featuring in Air Ministry requirements reflected in fighter designs such as the contemporaneous Gloster F.9/37 (Gloster G9) twin-engine bomber-interceptor – armed with five 20mm cannon at +12° – virtually all losses of Bomber Command aircraft shot down by Luftwaffe night fighters using upward-firing were ascribed to flak until 1944.

The gunner operated the turret through a control column with the firing button on the top. The motor could be put in high speed mode for swift changes of direction and the there was a handle for manual rotation of the turret.

The gunner's hatch was in the rear of the turret, which had to be rotated to the side for entry and exit. There was not enough room in the turret for the gunner to wear a seat-type or back pack parachute; the parachute was stowed alongside the gunner instead. This made escape from the aircraft so difficult that gunners were later provided with a special all-in-one garment, a 'parasuit', nicknamed the "rhino suit". Frederick "Gus" Platts, an air gunner who served in 230, 282 and 208 squadrons, stated: "The Rhino suit we had to wear on Defiants was a bear but I couldn't come up with an alternative, even though it killed dozens of us. I forget the details of it but we could not have sat on our chute or even keep it nearby as in other turrets, so you wore – all in one – an inner layer that fitted a little like a wetsuit of today. The chute fitted around this, and then the dinghy and the outer clothing. There was inner webbing and pockets that literally fell apart (I presume) when one bailed out".

== Operational history ==
=== Air combat ===
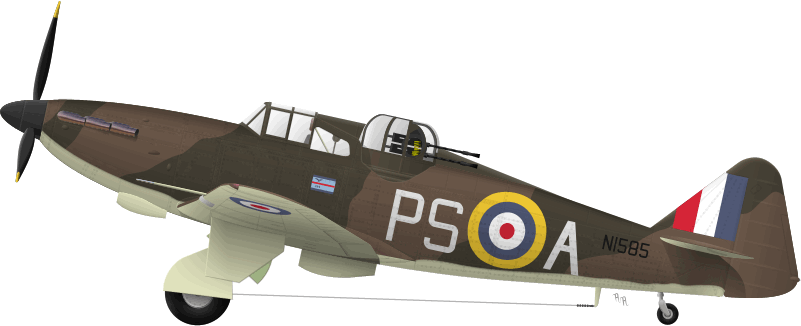
Defiant Mk.I N1585, PS-A of No. 264 Sqn., RAF Kirton in Lindsey, July 1940

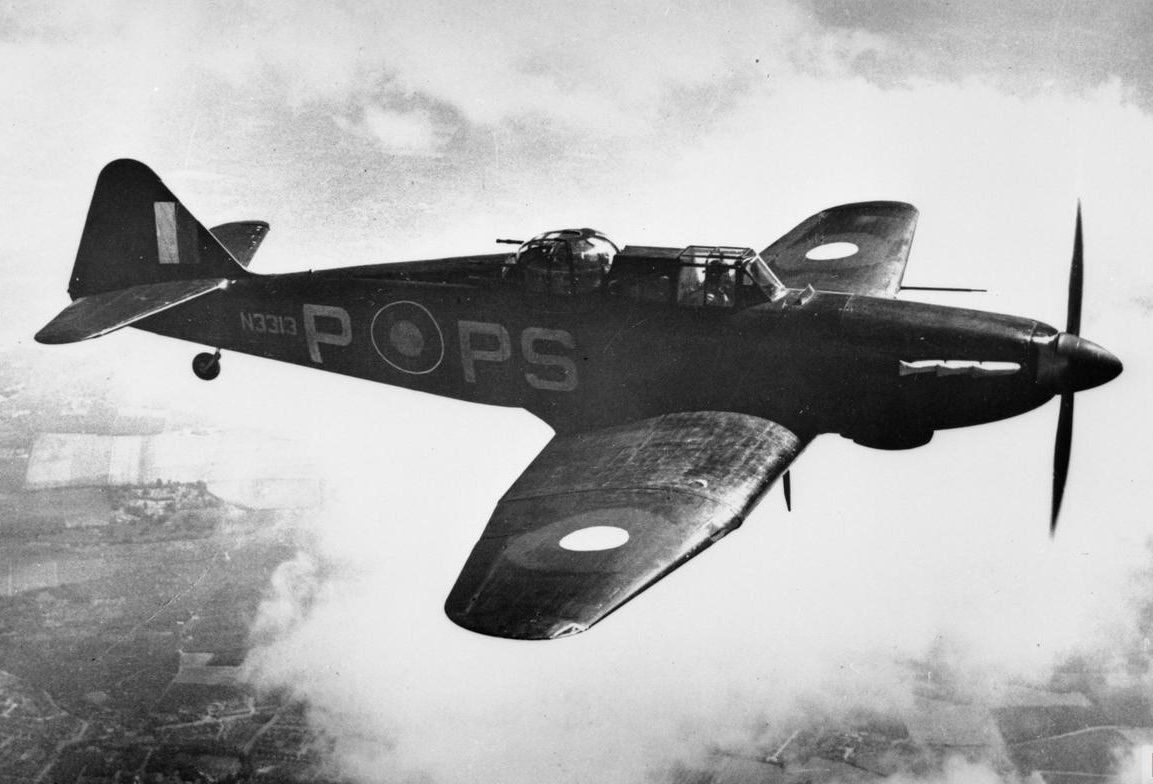
Defiant Mark I N3313 of No. 264 Squadron, 1940

In October 1939, No. 264 (Madras Presidency) Squadron was reformed at RAF Sutton Bridge to operate the Defiant. Initial training, formal squadron acceptance, and development of tactics began with other aircraft as it received its first Defiants only in early December at Martlesham Heath. In February 1940, the Defiant commenced night fighter training operations; the squadron tested its tactics against British medium bombers – Hampdens and Blenheims – and 264's CO flew against Robert Stanford Tuck in a Spitfire, showing that the Defiant could defend itself by circling and keeping its speed up. It became clear during these trials that the Defiant was suited only to performing the unescorted bomber-destroyer duties it was designed for, and was vulnerable to fighters.

By March 1940, 264 Squadron had two flights operational with Defiants and No. 141 Squadron received its first Defiant. When the Defiant was first introduced to the public, the RAF put out a disinformation campaign, stating that the Defiant had 21 guns: four in the turret, 14 in the wings and three cannon in the nose. On 12 May 1940, the first operational sortie occurred as a flight of six Defiants flew with six Spitfires of 66 Squadron over the English Channel to the coastline in the vicinity of The Hague, Netherlands; during this flight, a single Ju 88 which had been attacking a destroyer was shot down. The following day, in a patrol that was a repetition of the first, Defiants claimed four Junkers Ju 87 Stuka dive bombers, but were subsequently attacked by a flight of Bf 109Es. The escorting Spitfires were unable to prevent five of the six Defiants from being shot down by a frontal attack.

During the evacuation of the British Expeditionary Force from Dunkirk, the squadron was based at RAF Manston, as one of the 16 squadrons that No. 11 Group had for the evacuation. On 27 May 264 Squadron claimed three He 111 and two damaged. On 28 May, shortly after take-off, 10 Defiants were attacked by about 30 Bf 109s – forming a circle, they claimed six German fighters for the loss of three Defiants. The Defiant was initially successful against enemy aircraft and its best day was 29 May, when No. 264 Squadron claimed 37 kills in two sorties: 19 Ju 87 Stukas, mostly picked off as they came out of their dives, nine Messerschmitt Bf 110 twin-engined heavy fighters, eight Bf 109s, and a Ju 88. One Defiant gunner was lost after he bailed out, but the pilot managed to fly the aircraft back to its base and it was subsequently repaired. On 31 May, seven Defiants were lost in one day as Hurricanes and Spitfires failed to come to their aid in a battle with Bf 109s. It was concluded that underslung radio aerials on the Defiants had affected radio communication between the fighter squadrons.

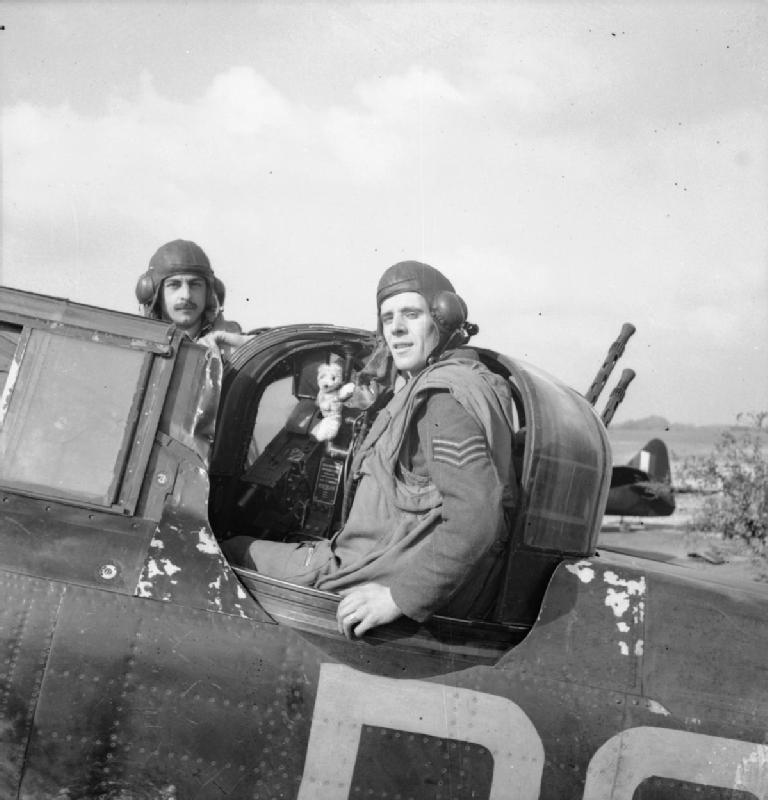
Flight Sergeants E R Thorn (pilot, left) and F J Barker (air gunner) pose with their Defiant after destroying their 13th Axis aircraft; Thorn and Barker were the most successful Defiant crew of the war.

Luftwaffe fighters suffered losses when "bouncing" flights of Defiants from the rear, apparently mistaking them for Hurricanes. The German pilots were unaware of the Defiant's rear-firing armament and encountered concentrated defensive fire. The Luftwaffe changed tactics, to outmanoeuvre the Defiant and attack from below or dead ahead, where the turret guns could not bear and offered no defence. Defiant losses quickly mounted, particularly among the gunners, who were often unable to leave stricken aircraft. The additional weight and aerodynamic drag of the turret, and the weight of the gunner, gave the Defiant a lower performance than single-seat fighter aircraft.

264 Squadron developed a counter against single-seat aircraft such as the Bf 109. By flying in an ever-descending Lufbery circle, Defiant crews sacrificed the advantage of height but eliminated the possibility of attack from underneath, while giving 360° of defensive fire. This tactic was used by 264 Squadron, but when the Defiants of 141 Sqn were committed to combat a few months later during the Battle of Britain, it chose to ignore their advice. On 19 July, seven out of nine 141 Squadron Defiants sent to cover a convoy off Folkestone were shot down by Bf 109s of JG 51, and the remaining two survived, one badly damaged, thanks only to the intervention of Hurricanes of 111 Sqn. The Hurricane pilots reported that the Defiants had shot down four Bf 109s. (Note: This action is sometimes called "slaughter of the innocents.") Although 264 Squadron claimed 48 kills in eight days over Dunkirk, the cost was high, with 14 Defiants lost. Actual German losses were no more than 12–15 enemy aircraft; the turret's wide angle of fire meant that several Defiants could engage the same target, leading to multiple claims.

On 22 August, in response to an urgent demand for aircraft to defend Britain's airspace, 264 Squadron relocated to RAF Hornchurch, Essex, while also using RAF Manston as a forward base. On 24 August, nine Defiants of 264 scrambled from Manston to engage an incoming German force; in the ensuing engagement, three Ju 88s and one Bf 109E were shot down for the loss of two Defiants. Later that day, another cluster of bombers appeared and were engaged by seven Defiants that had been refuelling; three Ju 88s and two Bf 109Es were shot down, one Defiant was shot down, and one damaged.

On 26 August 264 Squadron engaged a formation of twelve Dornier Do 17 bombers over north-eastern Kent, but was attacked by a large formation of Bf 109s. Three aircraft were lost, two to ace Hpt. Gunther Lutzow of JG 3, but six Do 17s and a Bf 109 were shot down. Three of those victories were awarded to one Defiant, crewed by Flight Sergeants E. R. Thorn (pilot) and F. J. Barker (air gunner). They shot down two Do 17s but were then engaged by a Bf 109, which set their Defiant on fire; they managed to shoot down the German fighter before making a forced landing; they were awarded a bar to the Distinguished Flying Medal. (Note: One of the Dornier 17s shot down by 264 Squadron that day, 5K+AR of Kampfgeschwader 3, crash–landed on the Goodwin Sands; two crew died and two survived to become prisoners. The aircraft later became submerged under shallow water and is the only known intact surviving Dornier 17. On 10 June 2013, it was the subject of a recovery operation by the Royal Air Force Museum. The identify of the Defiant that shot it down is unknown.)

The squadron lost a further five aircraft (to JG 26) on 28 August, with nine crew killed, and effectively ended operations, withdrawing to RAF Duxford the following day. With these losses, the Defiant—which had been intended from the start as a day- and night-fighter—was transferred to night operations only. The type had proven unsuited for fighter-to-fighter day combat, and was less capable than other RAF fighter aircraft such as the Hurricane and the Spitfire. By 31 August, over half the delivered Defiants had been shot down by Luftwaffe aircraft, a rate that was deemed unacceptable.

The Defiant's kill ratio was better than is commonly thought. In 20 days of frontline service in the Battle of Britain in July and August, 141 and 264 Squadron shot down 25 German aircraft for the loss of 17 Defiants. It was concluded that when operating against escorted bombers the Defiant should always be sent into battle with a top cover of Hurricanes or Spitfires so it could concentrate on its designed role of shooting down the bombers, but this proved impractical, particularly as the Defiant's radio reception was relatively poor due to its underslung antenna. The decision was made to switch the type to night operations, and there the Defiant saw some success.

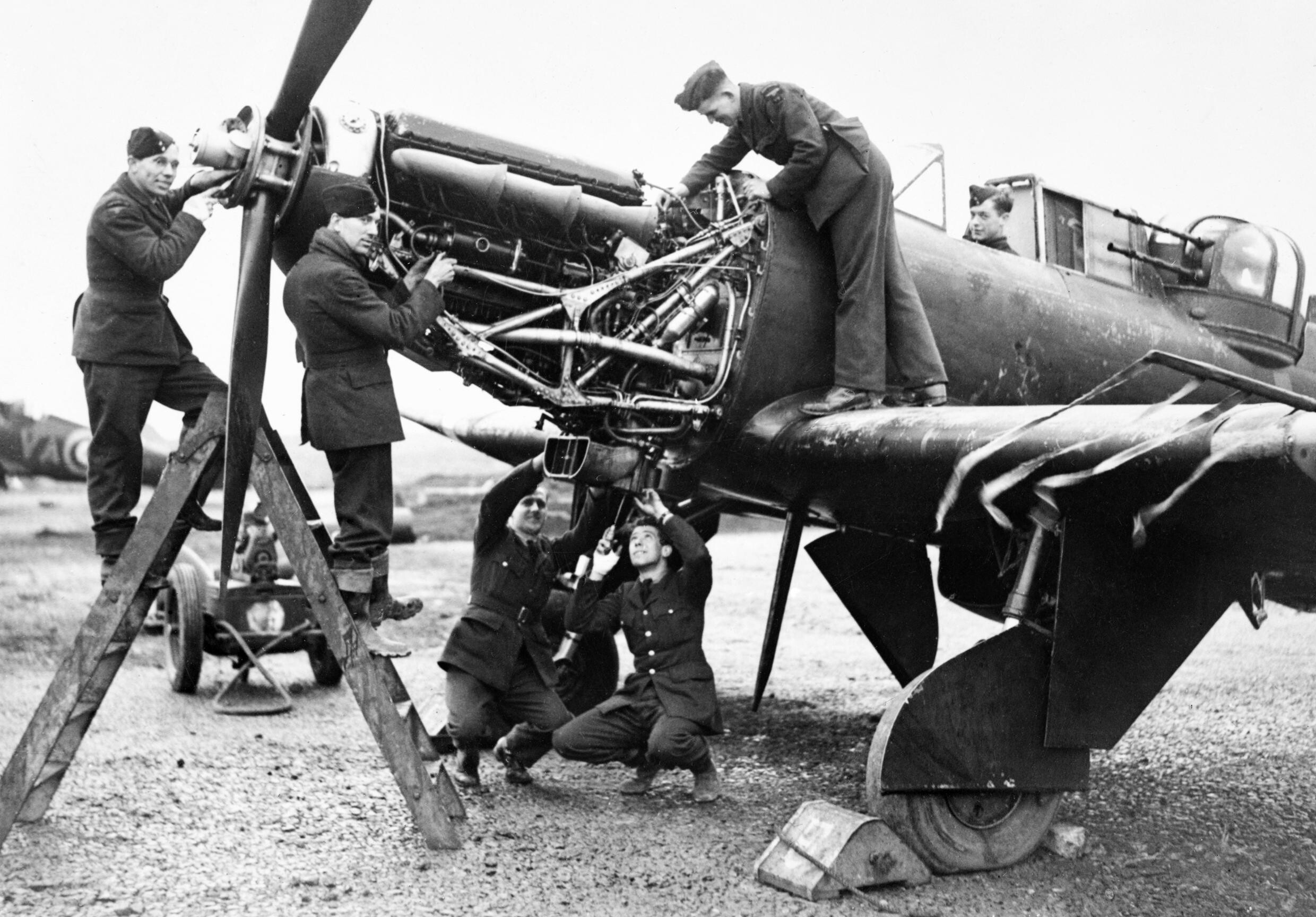
Groundcrew working on the Merlin engine of a Defiant at RAF Fairwood Common, Wales, January 1942

On 1 July, 141 Squadron despatched L6997 on the first Defiant night patrol. In August, the squadron was operating both by day and night; on 15 August, the first possible nighttime success by a Defiant was recorded, and from September onwards, the squadron principally operated at night. In September, as a response to the commencement of heavy attacks upon London by the Luftwaffe—The Blitz—B Flight of No. 141 moved to RAF Biggin Hill, Bromley, while A Flight relocated to RAF Gatwick, West Sussex in October, then to RAF Gravesend, Kent. Successful claimed interceptions took place, such as two He 111s being claimed on 15/16 September; the first confirmed kill, of a single He 111, by a Defiant of the squadron was made on 22 December.

The Defiant night fighters had initially lacked aircraft interception radar; enemy aircraft were spotted by crew observation aided by ground-based searchlights illuminating attacking bombers. In the opening months of 1941, as the German night bombing campaign reached its peak, increasing numbers of Defiant night fighter-equipped squadrons became operational and commenced night patrols although, according to Bowyer, there were relatively few claims from many Defiant sorties. However, aviation author John Taylor noted that during the Blitz on London of 1940–41, the four Defiant-equipped squadrons were responsible for shooting down more enemy aircraft than any other type in the theatre.

The improved Defiant Mk II model was fitted with the AI Mk. IV radar and a Merlin XX engine, increasing the aircraft's performance, particularly at nighttime. In September 1941, 264 Squadron became the first to receive the Defiant Mk II, bringing them into operational use by mid-September. The principal users of the Mk II night fighter were 96, 151, and 262 Squadrons. As the radar-equipped Defiants began filtering through to operational squadrons, the Luftwaffe's bombing campaign petered out as German forces had become heavily engaged in the Operation Barbarossa invasion of the Soviet Union.

Defiant night fighters typically attacked enemy bombers from below, in a similar manoeuvre to the later German Schräge Musik method. Defiants attacked more often from slightly ahead or to one side, rather than from directly under the tail. The turret-fighter concept was not immediately discarded. Four-gun turrets were fitted to Beaufighter (Mk II, in 1941) and Mosquito (Bristol design turret, September 1941) night fighters to test the advantages of flexible firing in night fighting, but the effect on top speed, reduced from 303 mph to 272 mph at altitude for the Beaufighter, was not acceptable, and those conversions were abandoned. Further developments using more powerful engines were considered, but the idea of a Defiant replacement was finally dropped in 1942.

=== Other roles ===
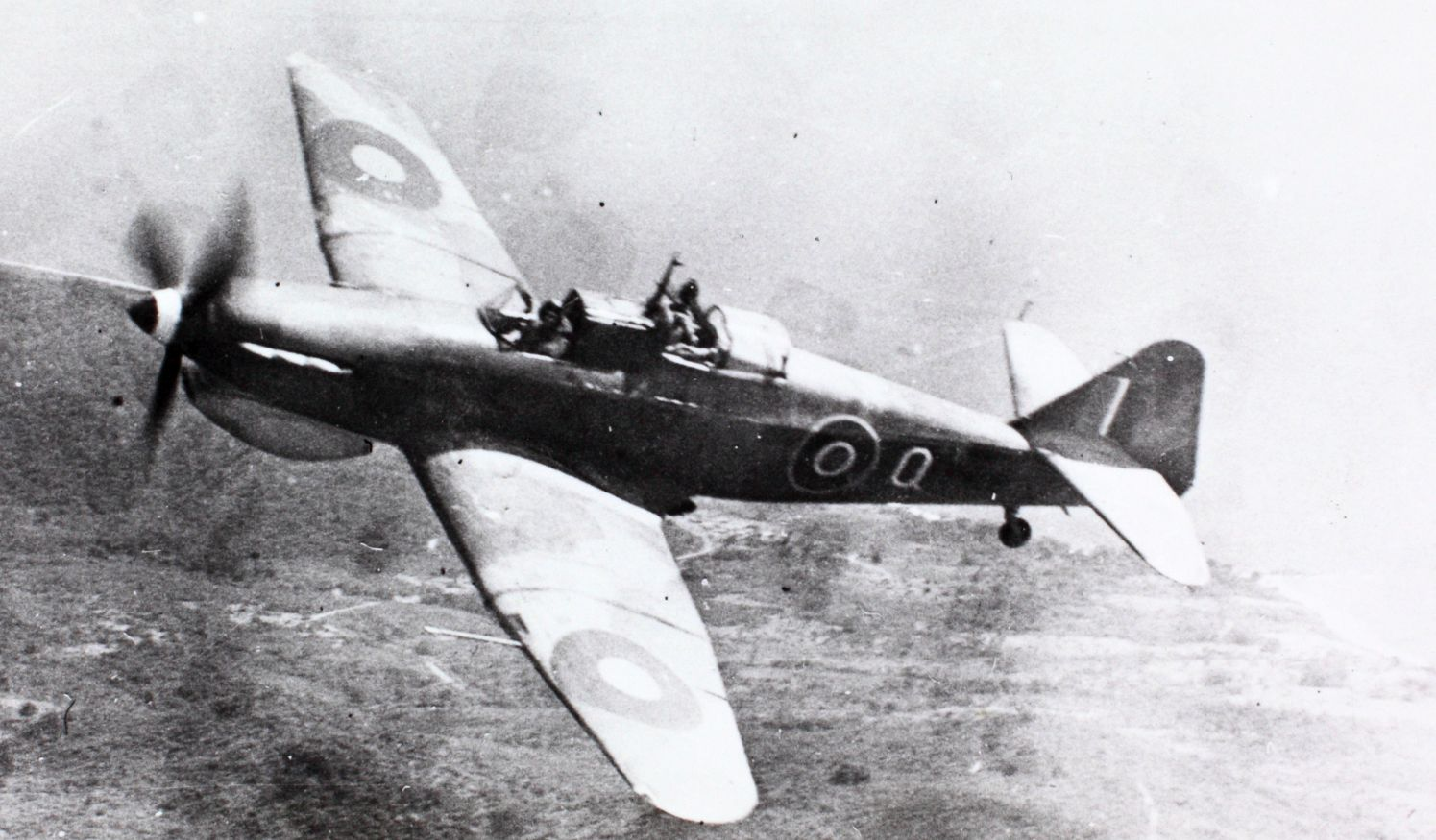
A Defiant TT Mk I in flight

After trials in 1940 with the School of Army Co-operation to assess its capabilities in that role, the Defiant was tested as a high-speed gunnery trainer with the Air Ministry agreeing to continue production. The Defiant was removed from combat duties in 1942 and used for training, target towing, electronic countermeasures and air-sea rescue.

Two types of electronic countermeasures equipment were carried by the Defiant, both countering the German Freya early warning radar. The first system to be deployed was "Moonshine", which re-transmitted the radar's signals to simulate large formations of aircraft. As each "Moonshine" transmitter only covered part of the Freya's frequency, a formation of eight Defiants was needed, giving the appearance of over 100 aircraft. As the system required formation flying, it could only be used in daylight, where it could draw German fighters onto British fighters leaving another area relatively free for a British bombing raid.

A "Special Duties Flight" was set up in May 1942 to use the new countermeasures equipment, with "Moonshine" being used for its first live test on 6 August 1942. Subsequently, it was used operationally as part of "Circuses" against coastal targets and on 19 August in support of the Dieppe Raid. The Flight became No. 515 Squadron RAF on 1 October 1942, operations with "Moonshine" continuing until November 1942.

515 Squadron continued operations with the second countermeasures system, "Mandrel", a noise jammer which overwhelmed the signals from Freya. Individual Defiants were sent to orbit positions 50 miles (80 km) off the enemy coast. By using nine aircraft a 200-mile (320-km) gap could be made in the Germans' radar coverage. 515 Squadron flew its first mission using Mandrel on the night of 5/6 December 1942, continuing to use its Defiants for jamming operations until early 1943, when it began to receive twin-engined Bristol Beaufighters which had longer range and could carry more electronic equipment. The Defiant flew its last jamming mission on 17 July 1943, with one aircraft being lost out of four sent out that night.

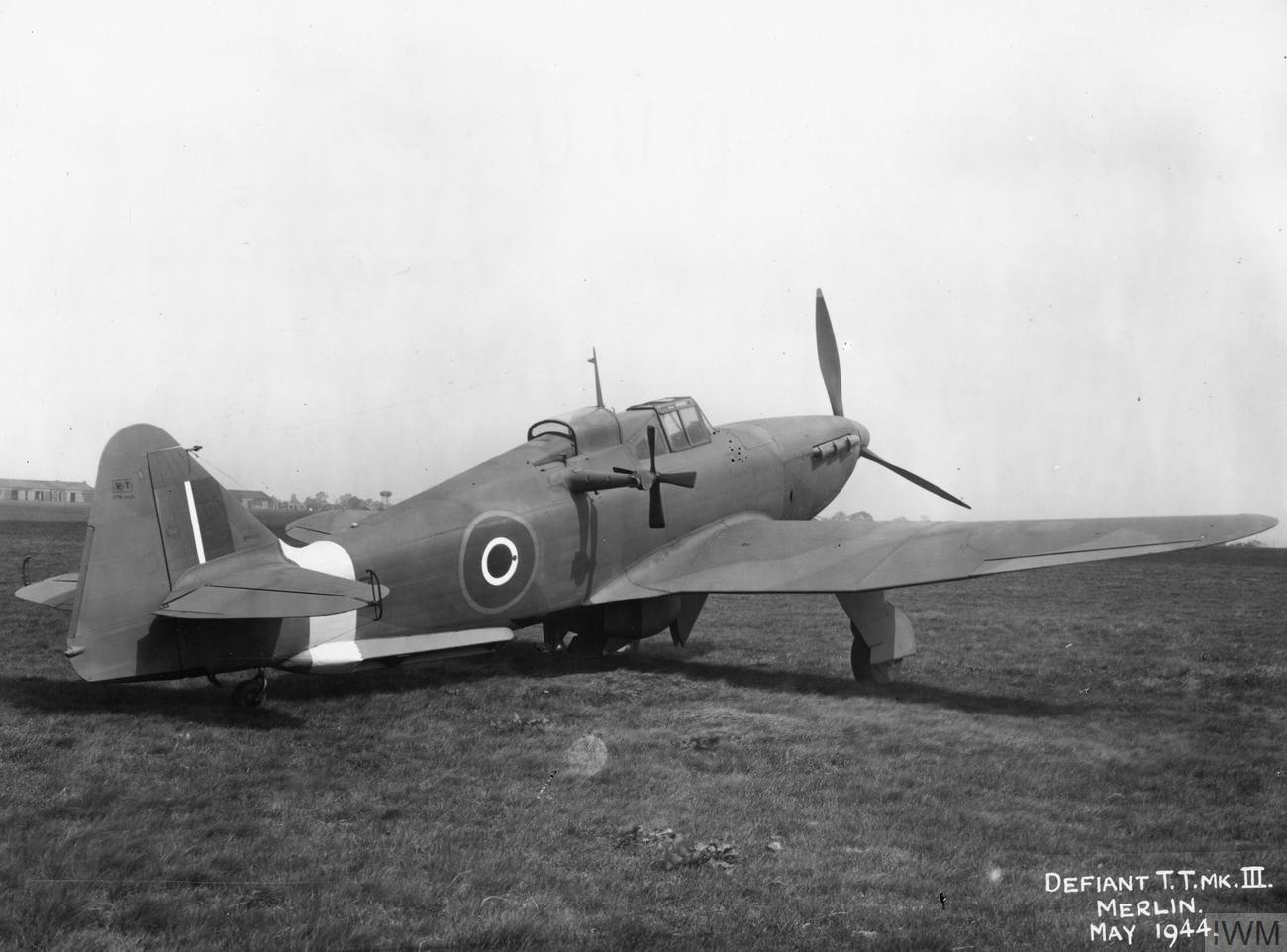
Defiant TT Mk III target tug, number N1697; RAF Desford, May 1944. The wind-driven generator provided power for the target winch

In the air-sea rescue role, the Defiant was the intended replacement for the Westland Lysander in shallow air-sea rescue units. In order for this task to be performed, Defiants in this capacity were equipped with a pair of underwing pods that each contained two M-type dinghies. In March 1942, No. 281 Squadron formed at RAF Ouston, Northumberland, partially operating Defiant Mk Is; four more squadrons received the type within the next two months. However, six months following their introduction to the role, the Defiant had proved to be a poor choice for the role, in part due to the aircraft already been worn out by their previous service, which limited the sortie rate; other issues included its high stalling speed and wide turning radius. By the end of 1942, the Defiant had been phased out of air-sea rescue.

A high-speed target tug variant, the considerably modified turretless Defiant Mk III, was developed in response to a growing demand. Many of the surviving Mk I and Mk II Defiants had their turrets removed when they were converted for the same role. In this final target-towing variant, the Defiant ended up with a number of overseas assignments with both the RAF and Fleet Air Arm in the Middle East, Africa and India. There were further deployments to Canada, where the Defiant was used as a target tug and trainer with the British Commonwealth Air Training Plan.

Defiants were also used for "special" work including tactical evaluations with the RAF Gunnery Research Unit and the Air Fighting Development Unit (AFDU) at Farnborough. Two Defiants were issued for ejection seat development work: one to R Malcolm Ltd (later ML Aviation), and the other to Martin-Baker. On 11 December 1944, Defiant DR944 was delivered to Martin-Baker's facility at Denham and fitted with an early ejector seat under trial in the observer's position. On 11 May 1945, Martin-Baker used DR944 to test their first ejection seat with dummy launches. Various trials using DR944 were made until May 1948. The other Defiant, AA292, was delivered to R Malcolm Ltd at White Waltham Airfield on 15 April 1945, and the first airborne trial with dummies was held that October.

The last operational use of Defiants was in India, where they were used as target tugs.

== Variants ==
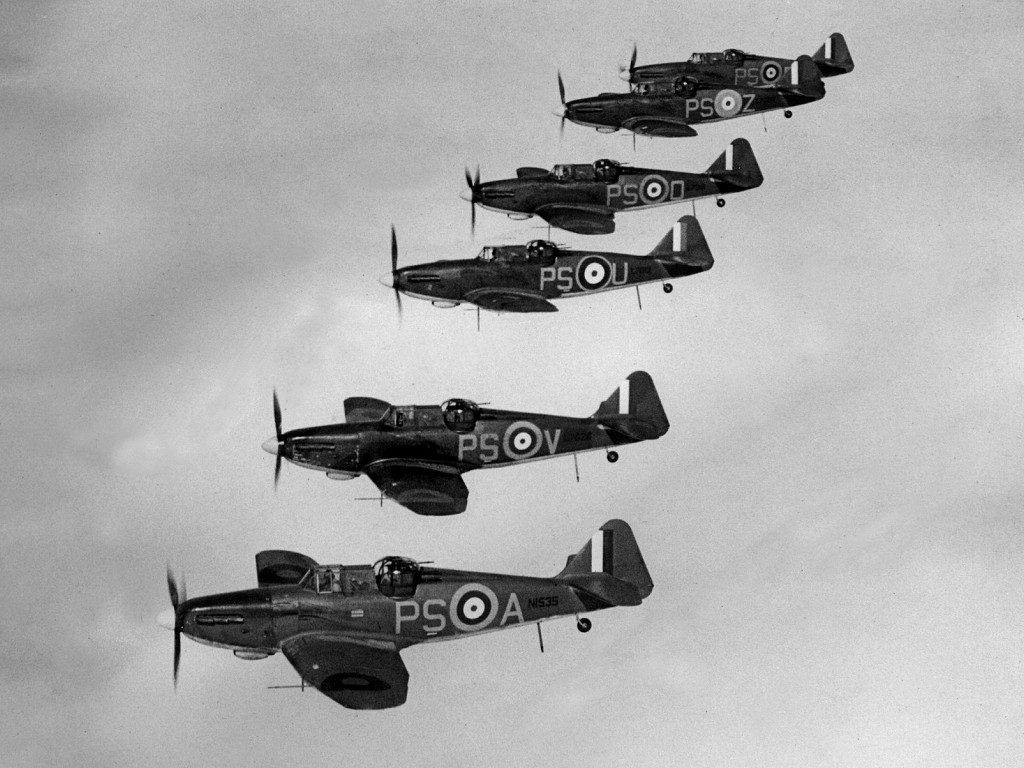
A formation of Defiants

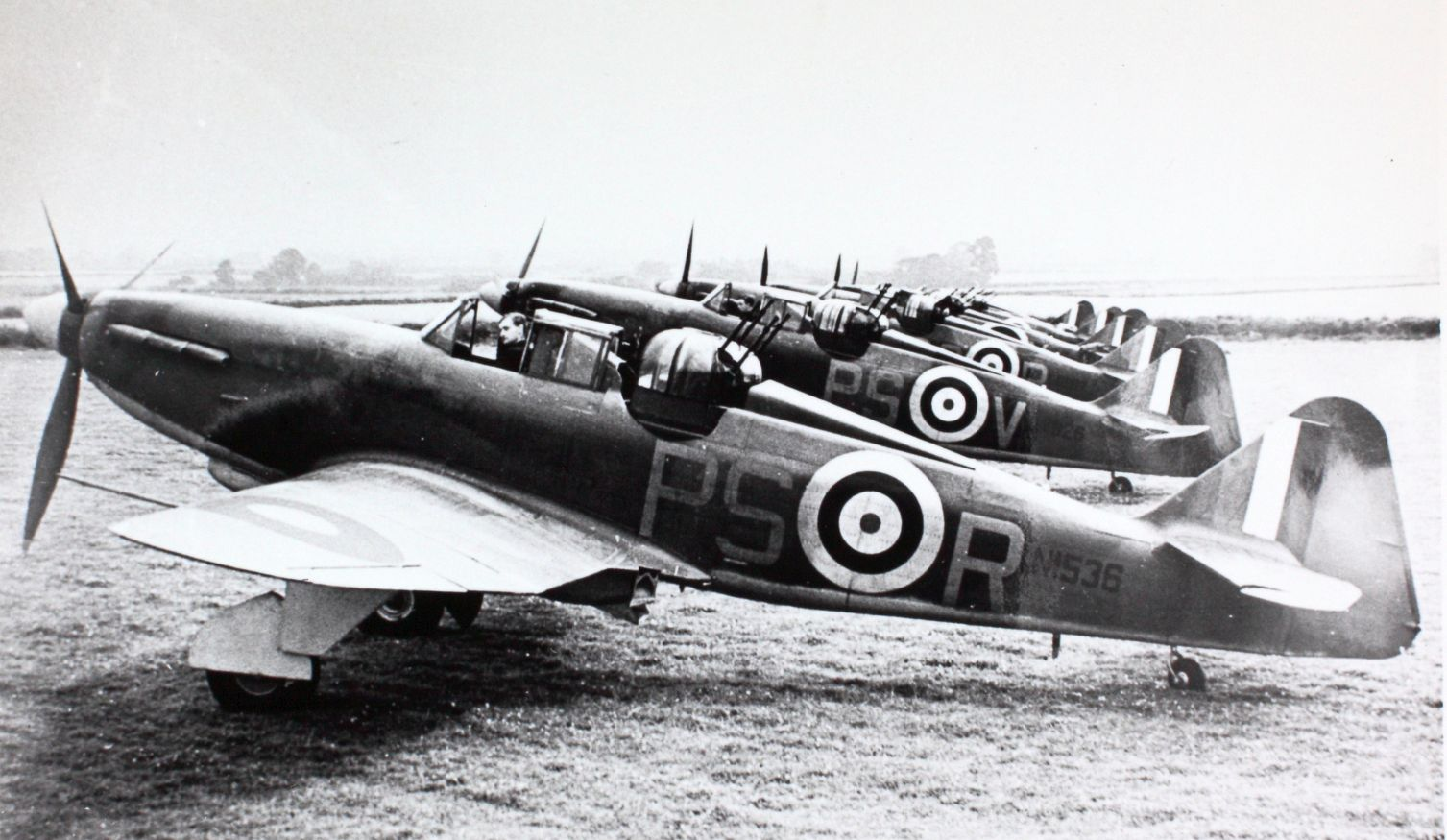
Several parked Defiants

Defiant Mk I
Two-seat turret fighter for the RAF, powered by a 1,030 hp (768 kW) Rolls-Royce Merlin III piston engine; 723 built.

Defiant NF Mk I
Defiant Mk I converted into night fighters

Defiant NF Mk IA
NF Mk I with aircraft interception radar.

Defiant ASR Mk I
Mk I carrying air-dropped dinghies for air-sea rescue.

Defiant TT Mk I
Defiant Mk IIs converted to target tugs; 150 conversions.

Defiant Mk II
Two-seat night fighter for the RAF, powered by a 1,280 hp (954 kW) Rolls-Royce Merlin XX piston engine, and fitted with the AI Mk IV aircraft interception radar; 210 built.

Defiant TT Mk III
Dedicated turret-less target tug; 140 built from new.

== Operators ==
- Australia
- British India
- Canada
- Poland
- United Kingdom
- United States

== Surviving aircraft ==
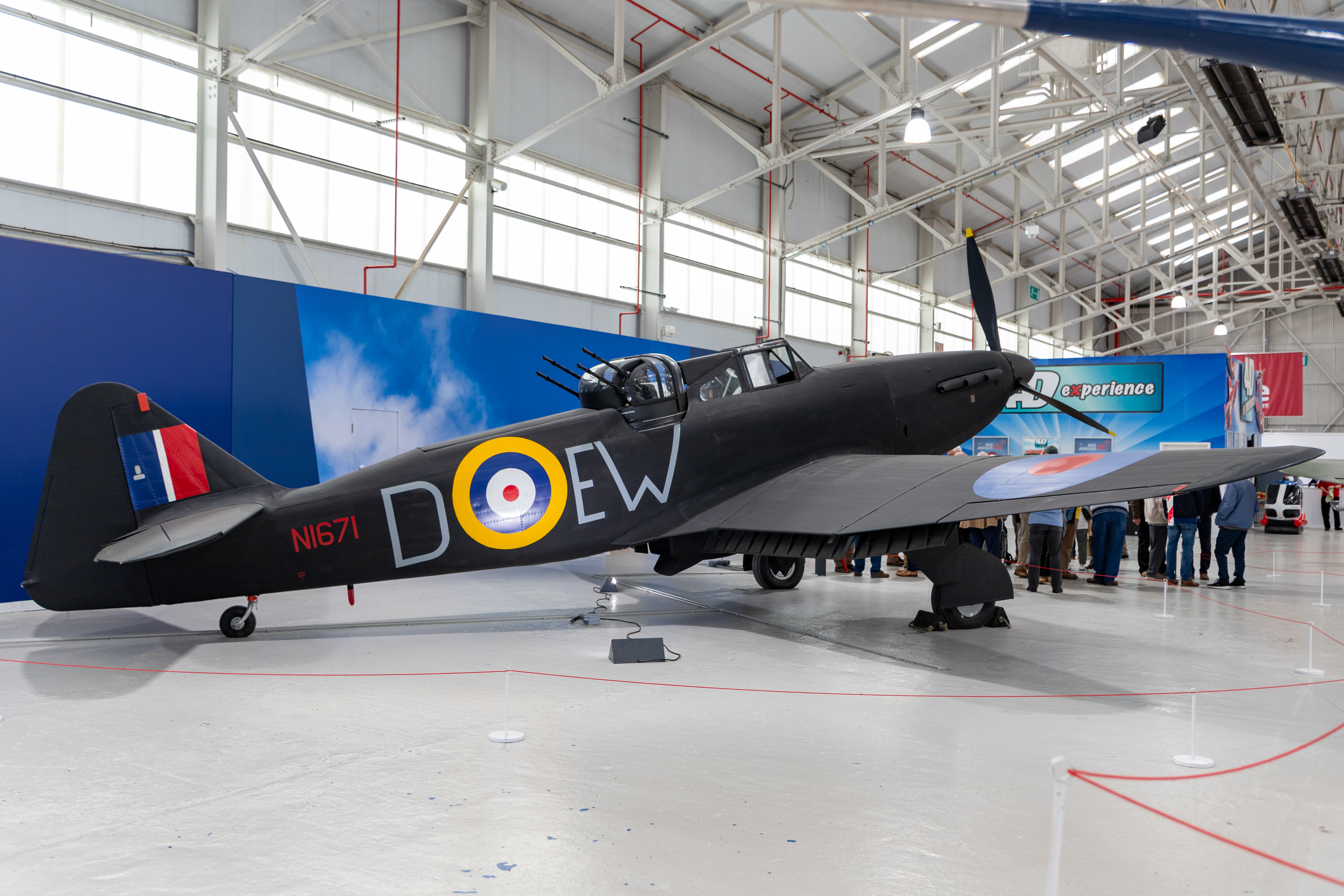
Defiant N1671, RAF Museum Cosford, 2023

The only surviving complete example of the type is a Defiant I, N1671, on display as a night fighter at the Royal Air Force Museum Cosford in Shropshire. N1671 was the 179th Defiant off the production line in Penderford. It was one of four Defiants delivered to No. 307 Polish Night Fighter Squadron at RAF Kirton in Lindsey, Lincolnshire on 17 September 1940 and was passed to No. 153 Squadron at the end of October 1941 and 285 Sqn in 1942. In 1954, it was identified for storage as a historical aircraft and passed to the RAF Museum at Hendon, London in 1971.

The aircraft was moved on 20 May 2009 to Rochester Airport, where it was restored by the Medway Aircraft Preservation Society (MAPS). It was returned to Hendon on 6 December 2012, and was then moved from Hendon to Royal Air Force Museum Cosford in November 2016 for display in the War in the Air hangar.

Major parts of at least two other Defiants survive; N1766 and N3378, both Mk Is. A full-scale replica Defiant was created on site at Boulton Paul in Wolverhampton by ex-Boulton Paul engineer Jack Holmes and team at the Boulton Paul Heritage Society. More than 50,000 man hours went into its production and it was unveiled in 2003 marking 60 years since the last Defiant flew out of Pendeford (the World War II training airfield next to the Boulton Paul Factory in Wolverhampton). Due to change of ownership at the Boulton Paul site, the Defiant faced losing its home in Wolverhampton, and in 2015 was relocated to its now permanent home on display at the Kent Battle of Britain Museum in the colours of 264 Squadron (L7005).

== Specifications (Mk I) ==
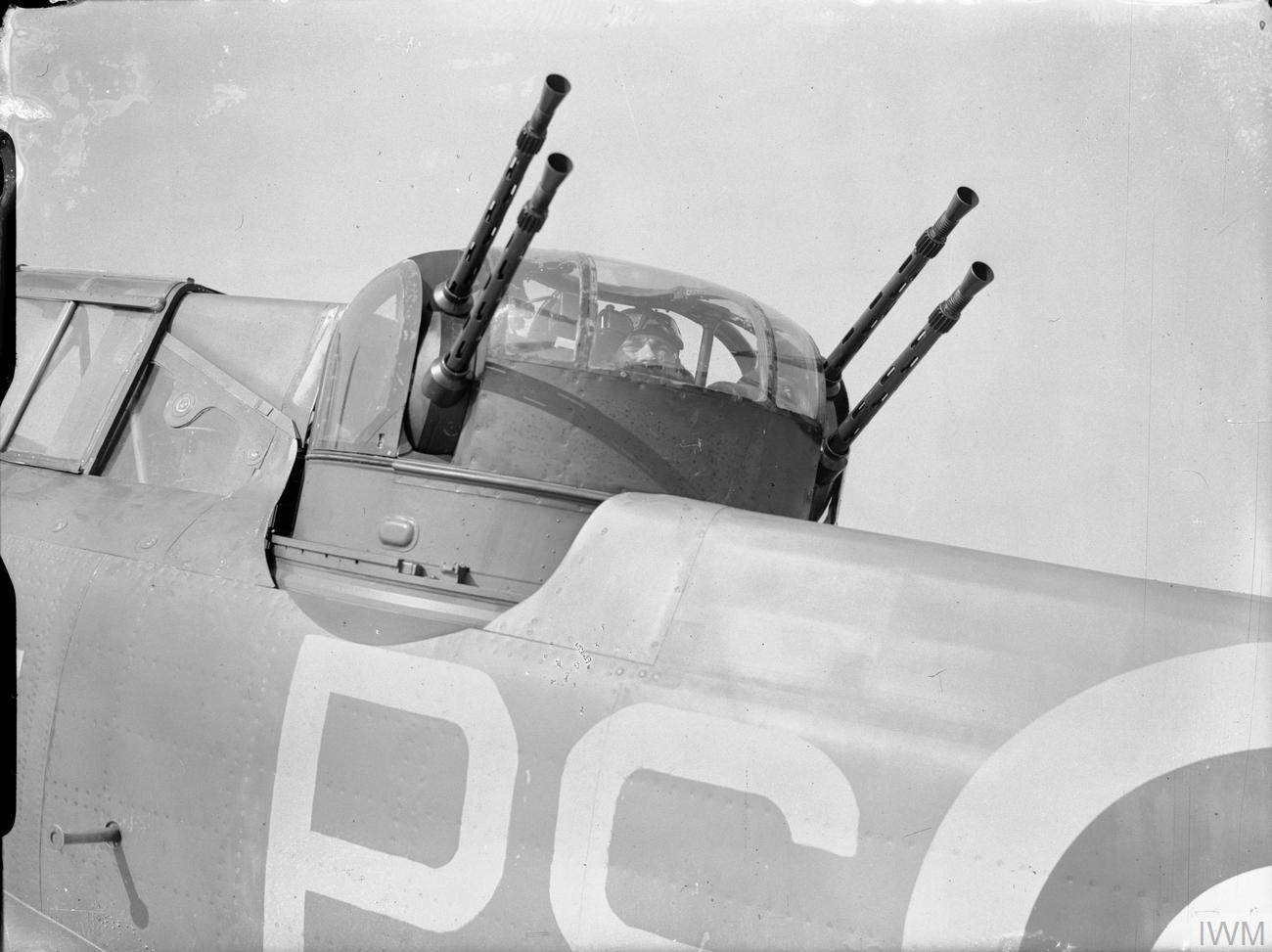
Closeup view of the turret of a Defiant with its four 0.303 in (7.7 mm) Browning machine guns

Data from War Planes of the Second World War: Volume Two Fighters, The Boulton Paul Defiant

General characteristics

- Crew: two: pilot, gunner
- Length: 35 ft 4 in (10.77 m)
- Wingspan: 39 ft 4 in (11.99 m)
- Height: 11 ft 4 in (3.45 m)
- Wing area: 250 sq ft (23 m^{2})
- Empty weight: 6,078 lb (2,757 kg)
- Gross weight: 8,318 lb (3,773 kg)
- Max takeoff weight: 8,600 lb (3,901 kg)
- Powerplant: 1 × Rolls-Royce Merlin III liquid-cooled V12 engine, 1,030 hp (770 kW)
- Propellers: 3-bladed

Performance

- Maximum speed: 304 mph (489 km/h, 264 kn) at 17,000 ft (5,200 m)
- Cruise speed: 175 mph (282 km/h, 152 kn) at 15,000 ft (4,600 m)
- Range: 465 mi (748 km, 404 nmi)
- Endurance: 1hr 47min
- Service ceiling: 31,000 ft (9,400 m)
- Time to altitude: 8.5 min to 15,000 ft (4,600 m)

Armament

- Guns: 4 × 0.303 M1919 Browning machine guns in hydraulically powered dorsal turret (600 rpg)

== See also ==
External videos
- A compilation of information and period footage of the Defiant
- Slideshow of a preserved Defiant on static display
- British Pathé newsreel on the manufacturing of the Defiant

- GWR Castle-class 5080 Defiant steam locomotive

Aircraft of comparable role, configuration, and era

- Blackburn Roc
- Hawker Hotspur

Related lists

- List of aircraft of the Royal Air Force
- List of aircraft of World War II
