= Boulton Paul Balliol =

British military training aircraft

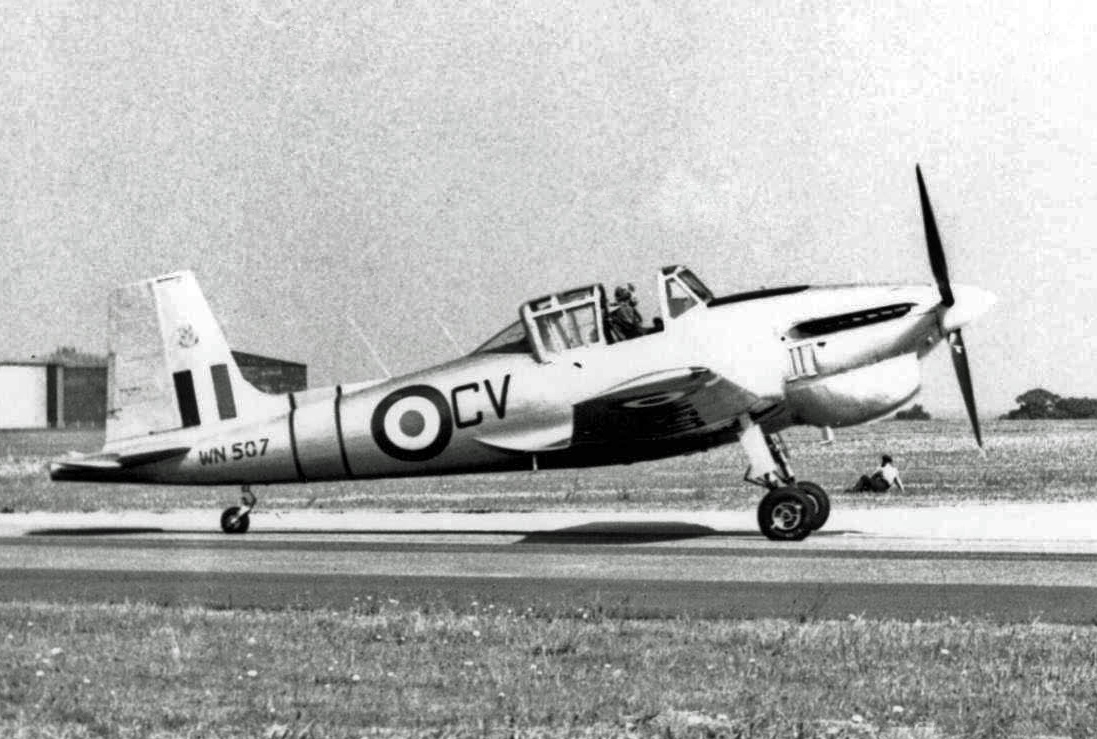
- Balliol T.2 in 1955

General information
- Type: Two-seat Trainer
- Manufacturer: Boulton Paul Aircraft
- Designer: John Dudley North
- Status: Retired
- Primary users: Royal Air Force Fleet Air Arm; Royal Ceylon Air Force
- Number built: 229

History
- Introduction date: 1950
- First flight: 30 May 1947

The Boulton Paul Balliol and Sea Balliol are monoplane advanced trainer aircraft designed and produced by the British aircraft manufacturer Boulton Paul Aircraft. On 17 May 1948, it became the world's first single-engined turboprop aircraft to fly. The Balliol was operated primarily by both the Royal Air Force (RAF) and the Royal Navy Fleet Air Arm (FAA).

Developed during the late 1940s, the Balliol was designed to fulfil Air Ministry Specification T.7/45, replacing the wartime North American Harvard trainer. Unlike previous trainer aircraft, which were powered by piston engines, it was specified for the aircraft to use newly developed turboprop propulsion instead. On 30 May 1947, the Balliol performed its maiden flight; the first preproduction aircraft would fly during the following year. Production examples were powered by the Rolls-Royce Merlin engine, while various prototypes and pre-production aircraft featured alternative powerplants such as the Rolls-Royce Dart and Armstrong Siddeley Mamba turboprop engines.

The Balliol entered service with the RAF in 1950 and proved to be a relatively trouble-free trainer. However, a shift in attitudes towards turbojet-powered trainer aircraft would see orders being curtailed for the type by 1952. Despite this, a navalised version of the aircraft, the Sea Balliol, was also introduced for deck landing training. The type also saw some use in other capacities, such as for experimental flights. Only a single export customer, the Royal Ceylon Air Force, would procure the type.

== Development ==
=== Origins ===
During March 1945, the Air Ministry issued Specification T.7/45, which sought a new advanced trainer to succeed the Royal Air Force's (RAF) fleet of North American Harvards. Amongst the requirements specified was the use of the newly developed turboprop engine, as it was felt that the new generation of advanced trainers would better prepare pilots for flying jet-powered combat aircraft such as the newly emerged Gloster Meteor fighter aircraft. As a fallback measure in case of difficulties being encountered with engine development programmes, the envisioned trainer was also to readily accommodate a more conventional Bristol Perseus radial engine as well.

A further stipulation by the ministry was the fitting of a three-seat cockpit in a configuration roughly akin to the contemporary Percival Prentice basic trainer. The pilot and instructor were sat in a side-by-side arrangement, while a second student could be accommodated in a third seat to the rear, positioned as to enable them to closely observe the pilot and the instructions being issued. The trainer was to be configured to perform various forms of training, being suitable for both day and night operations, featuring both guns and bombs for armament training, a glider-towing capability, and a general design that would be compatible with navalisation measures, such as a strengthened undercarriage and the fitting of arrestor gear.

Within a month of the specification's issuing, Boulton Paul Aircraft had opted to produce multiple proposals in response, as large orders had been anticipated. Boulton Paul's P.108 proposal, which would become the Balliol, was that of a conventional low-wing monoplane, featuring retractable main undercarriage and a fixed tailwheel. Towards the end of August 1945, Boulton Paul received an order from the Air Ministry, calling for the production of a batch of four prototypes, which were to be powered by the Rolls-Royce Dart turboprop engine. During August 1946, this was followed by a larger order for 20 pre-production aircraft, with ten each to be powered by the Dart and the Armstrong Siddeley Mamba turboprop, with delays to development of the Dart meaning that the prototypes would now be fitted by the Mamba. Competing proposals from other manufacturers were also submitted, including Avro's Athena in particular.

=== Into flight ===
As the Mamba was not flight-ready at the time of the first prototype's completion, it was instead powered by a 820 hp (611 kW) Bristol Mercury 30 radial engine during its initial test flights. Thus powered, it first flew on 30 May 1947, after teething issues with the undercarriage had been resolved during ground testing. The second prototype, powered by the intended Mamba engine, first flew on 17 May 1948, becoming the world's first single-engined turboprop aircraft to fly. Early handling trials at MOD Boscombe Down revealed the aircraft to possess relatively gentle and easy flight characteristics across all typical circumstances, with only minor suggestions for improvements being produced, such as the lack of a port-side walkway and directional snaking unbecoming to a gun platform.

Meanwhile, the Air Ministry had second thoughts about its training requirements thus, in 1947, it issued a new specification, T.14/47, requiring a two-seat trainer that was powered by a Rolls-Royce Merlin piston engine. This engine which was available in large numbers from surplus stocks leftover from the war, rather than expensive turboprops that would have to bought in new. On 10 July 1948, the first Merlin-powered Balliol, designated Balliol T.2, performed its first flight. The observer's seat of the Mk 1 was removed, the side-by-side seats remaining. Following an extensive evaluation, the Balliol was chosen as the victor over the rival Athena, leading to sizable orders being promptly placed to replace some of the Harvards in RAF service.

The RAF naming conventions for various types preferred that pure trainers, not conversion type trainers, should have names related to education or places of learning e.g. Airspeed Oxford, Avro Tutor and Athena, the Percival Prentice and Provost and De Havilland Dominie. Balliol is an Oxford University College and it alliterated with 'Boulton Paul'.

=== Further development ===
A specialised model for the Royal Navy's Fleet Air Arm (FAA), designated Sea Balliol T.21, was also developed. Various design changes were made to the aircraft as to better adapt it for shipboard use on board the service's aircraft carriers. These included the fitting of an arrestor hook, which was necessary for landings at sea.

While the Balliol was successfully introduced to service during 1950, its fortunes had dramatically changed within a single year. This was largely due to attitudes amongst staff at the Air Ministry having shifted once again on the topic of training requirements, with the RAF now wanting a jet-powered advanced trainer aircraft instead. This would result in the procurement of the rival de Havilland Vampire T.Mk11 at the Balliol's expense.

== Design ==
The Boulton Paul Balliol is an advanced trainer aircraft, being configured for use by military operators. In terms of its basic configuration, it was relatively traditional, featuring a conventional landing gear, of which the two main gear were retractable but the tailwheel was not. Having anticipated student pilots being particularly rough on the aircraft, it was designed to be both durable and as easy to maintain as possible, featuring around 40 inspection hatches, typically secured by quick-release fasteners, across the fuselage to facilitate this. For greater simplicity of maintenance, wherever feasible, components were designed to be interchangeable, such as the fin, tailplane, wing tanks, main gear oleos, and other elements.

Structurally, the Balliol comprises seven main sections, three of which form the fuselage, two for the wing sections, and the remaining two for the tail unit. The majority of exterior covering was light alloy stressed-skin, supported by a combination of subframes and longerons, while the rear section incorporated a monocoque approach. Fuel was accommodated within a mixture of wing tanks and a single fuselage tank, the former being easy to remove while the wing was folded. For additional safety, various measures to reduce potential accident-related damage were incorporated into the design, such as the strengthened crash-resistant structure around the cockpit, and the three rubber crash skids on the underside of the fuselage to minimise damage from a wheels-up landing.

The wings of the Balliol feature two-spar construction within an uninterrupted rigid torsion box. Most of the wing's structure comprised pressed light alloys, while an auxiliary spar was used to support the trailing edge skinning and flaps and the forward section accommodated the steel box wells for the retractable main undercarriage. The outer wings were fitted with simple dive brakes, along with conventional inner and outer split flaps that ran as far as the ailerons. While the starboard wing featured a single G45 cine-camera, the port wing featured a single .303 Browning machine gun. The wings were designed to be manually foldable, needing only two bolts to be removed, without affected the control runs.

Production Balliols were powered by a single Rolls-Royce Merlin engine, which was fitted to the front of the aircraft. The engine compartment featured distinctly different construction from the rest of the aircraft, being composed of light alloys supported by steel tubing; the engine itself was mounted on three struts attached to the firewall between the compartment and the cockpit.

The jet pipe of the turboprop engined prototype was angled downwards, running beneath the cockpit to an exhaust on the lower starboard side of the fuselage, somewhat counteracting the torque generated by the aircraft's three-bladed propeller as well as contributing roughly 20 per cent of the aircraft's total static thrust. Access to the engine compartment was provided via numerous detachable hatches on the sides and lower portions.

== Operational history ==
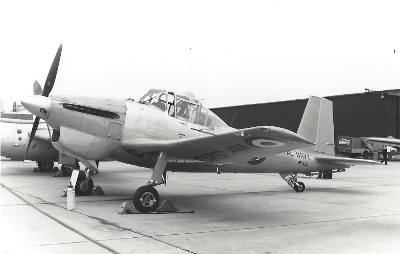
Boulton Paul Sea Balliol T.21, circa 1962

During 1950, several pre-production Balliols were delivered to the RAF's Central Flying School for evaluation purposes. However, due to the change in air training policy, the Balliol was only ever delivered to a single Flying Training School, No. 7 at RAF Cottesmore, where the type promptly replaced their Harvards. Numerous examples were also operated at the RAF College, Cranwell, until it was replaced there by the de Havilland Vampire T.Mk 11 in 1956. The Balliol also saw limited squadron service from 1953 with No. 288 Squadron, based at RAF Middle Wallop. Operations with the type continued until the squadron was disbanded in September 1957.

The Sea Balliol served with 781 squadron at Lee-on-Solent and 1843 Squadron RNVR at Abbotsinch. The final example was delivered during December 1954. The last remaining active Sea Balliols stationed at Abbotsinch with withdrawn around September 1963.

In addition to its primary use as a trainer aircraft, several Balliols were operated for other purposes, including as test aircraft. In this capacity, one aircraft participated in the flight testing of radar absorbent coatings.

The majority of Balliols were delivered to the domestic military services, however export arrangements were also sought out by the manufacturer. The Royal Ceylon Air Force were ultimately the only export customer for the type, opting to procure a batch of 12 Balliol Mk.2s for its training purposes; of these, seven were drawn from cancelled contracts for the RAF and the remainder from RAF reserves, the latter being replaced by a further five production aircraft.

== Variants ==
P.108
Company designation for type.

T.Mk 1 Balliol
Prototypes, three were built. The first prototype had a Bristol Pegasus radial, and the other two had Armstrong Siddeley Mamba turboprops.

T.Mk 2 Balliol
Production model of Royal Air Force advanced trainer powered with a Rolls Royce Merlin; 196 built, including 166 by Boulton Paul, and 30 by Blackburn.

T.Mk 21 Sea Balliol
Fleet Air Arm advanced trainer. 30 built by Boulton Paul.

== Operators ==
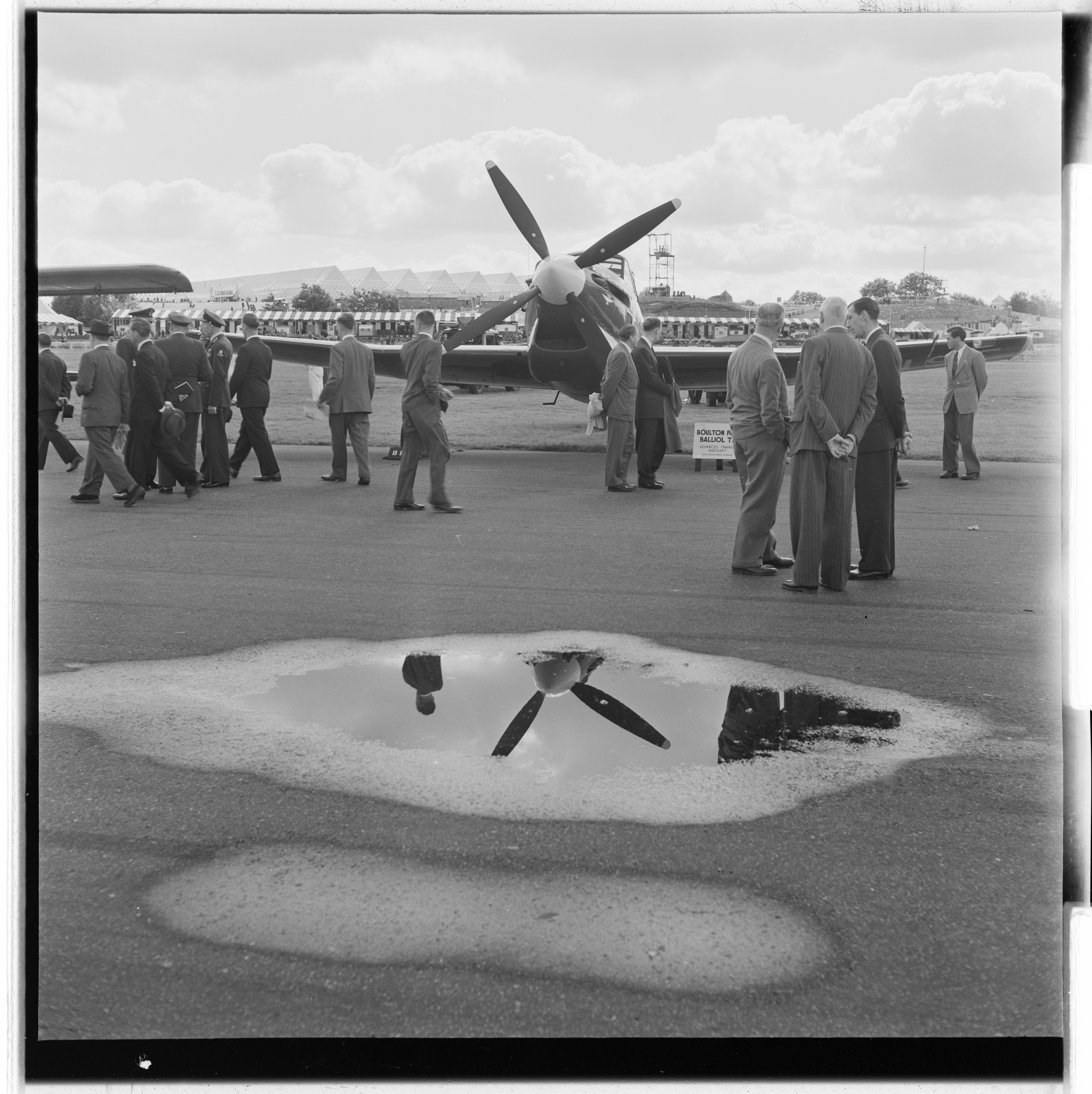
A Boulton Paul Balliol at the 1954 Farnborough Air Show

Ceylon

- Royal Ceylon Air Force

United Kingdom

- Aeroplane and Armament Experimental Establishment
- Empire Test Pilot's School
- Royal Air Force
  - No. 288 Squadron at Middle Wallop (1953-57)
  - No. 228 Operational Conversion Unit at RAF Leeming
  - No. 233 Operational Conversion Unit at RAF Pembrey
  - No. 238 Operational Conversion Unit at RAF Colerne
  - No. 2 Flying Training School, RAF Ternhill
  - No. 6 Flying Training School, RAF Ternhill
  - No. 7 Flying Training School at RAF Cottesmore (1952-54)
  - No. 3/4 Civilian Anti-Aircraft Co-operation Unit at Exeter Airport
  - Central Flying School
  - Central Gunnery School
  - Royal Air Force College Cranwell
- Royal Navy, Fleet Air Arm
  - 702 Naval Air Squadron (1957-58)
  - 703 Naval Air Squadron (1951)
  - 727 Naval Air Squadron (1956-59)
  - 765 Naval Air Squadron (1957)
  - 781 Naval Air Squadron (1954-58)
  - 796 Naval Air Squadron (1957-58)
  - 1831 Naval Air Squadron Royal Naval Volunteer Reserve (RNVR) (1954-57)
  - 1832 Naval Air Squadron RNVR (1955)
  - 1834 Naval Air Squadron RNVR (1954-55)
  - 1840 Naval Air Squadron RNVR (1954-55)
  - 1842 Naval Air Squadron RNVR (1954-55)
  - 1844 Naval Air Squadron RNVR (1954-57)

== Surviving aircraft ==
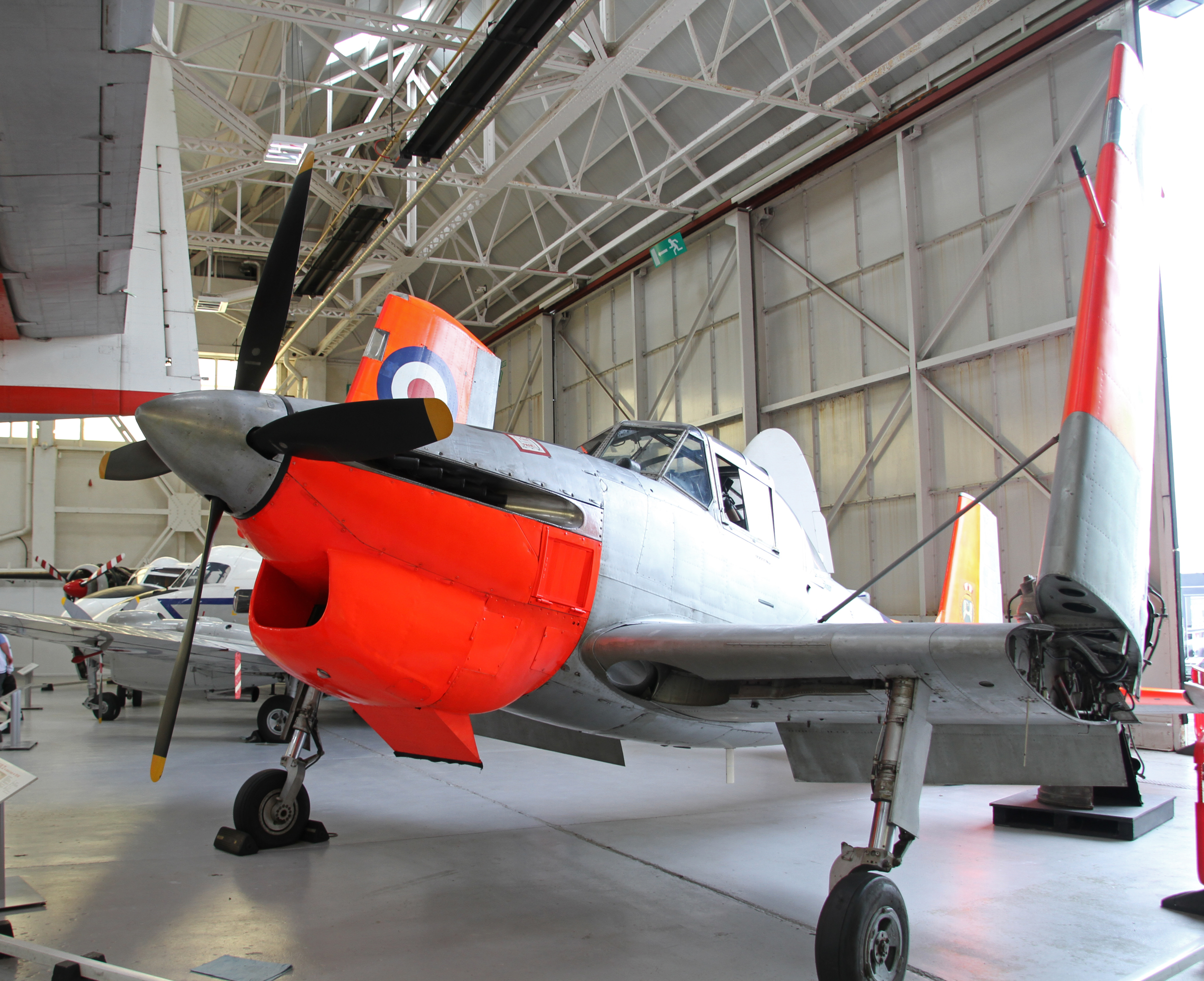
A preserved Boulton Paul Sea Balliol T.21 on display at the Royal Air Force Museum Midlands

=== Sri Lanka ===
On display

- Balliol T2 CA310 is on static display on the parade ground at SLAF Ground Combat Training Unit at Diyatalawa.

Stored or under restoration

- Balliol T2 CA303 is in storage at the Sri Lankan Air Force Museum, Ratmalana Air Base.

=== United Kingdom ===
Stored or under restoration

- Sea Balliol T21 WL732 former Royal Navy and A&AEE aircraft formerly on display in Hangar 1 at the Royal Air Force Museum Midlands.
- Balliol T2 WN149 formerly at the Cornwall Aviation Heritage Centre at Newquay Airport. The aircraft was restored to display standard by the Boulton Paul Association at Wolverhampton, West Midlands, and delivered to Newquay on 7 January 2021. now at North Weald

== Specifications (T.Mk.2) ==
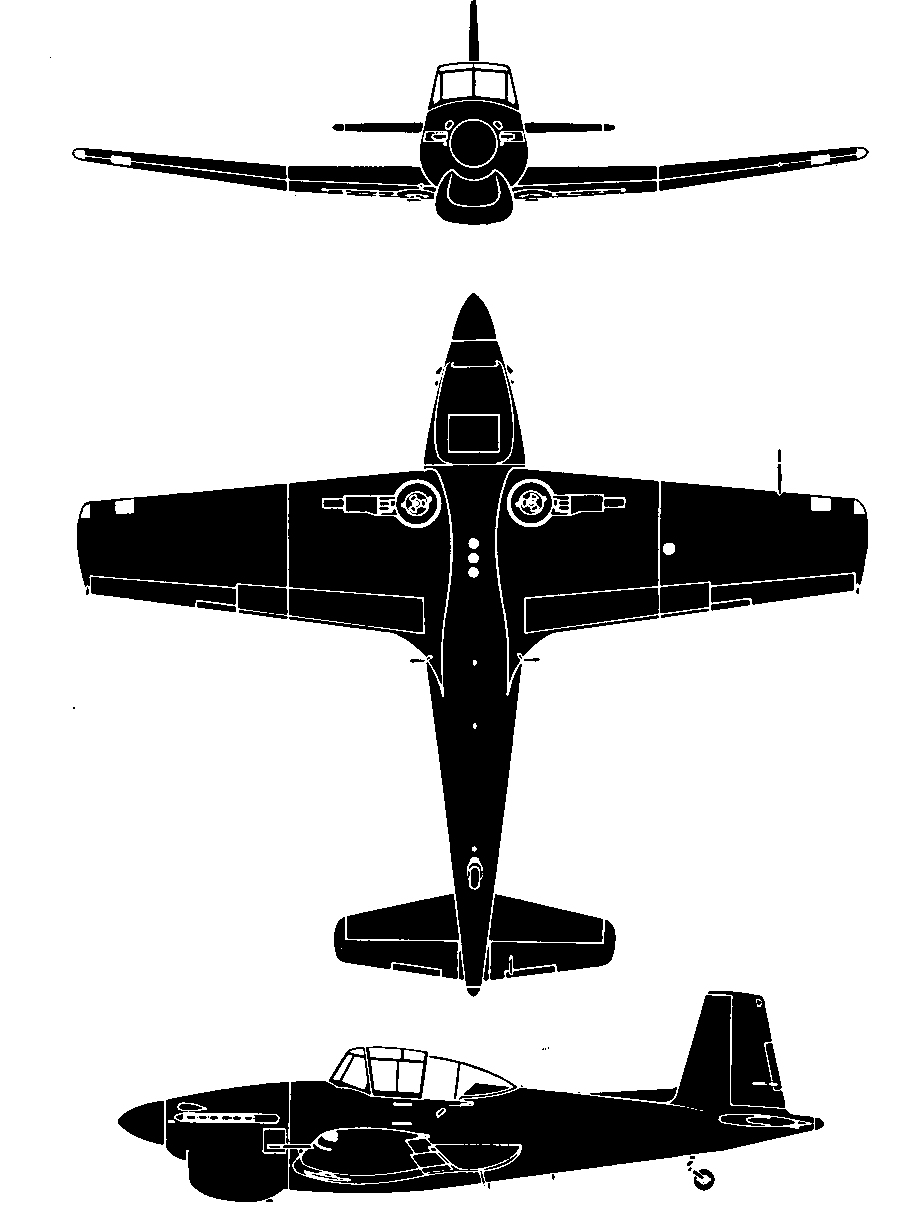
Boulton & Paul Balliol T.2

Data from Aircraft of the Royal Air Force

General characteristics

- Crew: 2
- Length: 35 ft 1 1/2 in (10.71 m)
- Wingspan: 39 ft 4 in (11.99 m)
- Height: 12 ft 6 in (3.81 m)
- Wing area: 250 sq ft (23 m^{2})
- Airfoil: NACA 65
- Empty weight: 6,730 lb (3,053 kg)
- Gross weight: 8,410 lb (3,815 kg)
- Fuel capacity: 125 imp gal (150 US gal; 570 L)
- Powerplant: 1 × Rolls-Royce Merlin 35 liquid-cooled V12 engine, 1,245 hp (928 kW)
- Propellers: 4-bladed de Havilland constant speed propeller, 11 ft 3 in (3.43 m) diameter

Performance

- Maximum speed: 288 mph (463 km/h, 250 kn) at 9,000 ft (2,700 m)
- Cruise speed: 231 mph (372 km/h, 201 kn) at 5,500 ft (1,700 m) (weak mix)
- Stall speed: 83 mph (134 km/h, 72 kn)
- Endurance: three hours at 220 mph (190 kn; 350 km/h)
- Service ceiling: 32,500 ft (9,900 m)
- Rate of climb: 1,790 ft/min (9.1 m/s)
- Time to altitude: six minutes to 10,000 ft (3,000 m)
- Takeoff distance to 50 ft (15 m): 1,350 ft (410 m)
- Landing distance from 50 ft (15 m): 1,950 ft (590 m)

Armament

- Guns: one × 0.303 in (7.7 mm) Browning machine gun in port wing
- Rockets: Provision for four × "60-lb" rockets

== See also ==
Aircraft of comparable role, configuration, and era

- Avro Athena

Related lists

- List of aircraft of the Royal Air Force
