= John Dudley North =

John Dudley North (1893–11 January 1968), CBE, HonFRAeS, MIMechE, was Chairman and Managing Director of Boulton Paul Aircraft.

Born at 18 Kinver Road North, Peak Hill, Sydenham, London in 1893 and educated at Bedford School, North became Chief Engineer for Claude Graham-White of the Grahame-White Aviation Co. Ltd., before the onset of World War I. This was a very responsible post for a young man in a young company within a fledgling and vital industry. He moved on in 1915 to become superintendent of the aviation department of Austin Motor Company. In 1917 he joined Boulton Paul in Norwich and commenced his long association with the company and its aircraft division, Boulton Paul Aircraft, which set up in Wolverhampton before the Second World War. Mr North rose to the position of managing director of Boulton Paul Aircraft in 1951, and was also the company’s chief engineer. He retired in 1954.

During North’s time with Boulton Paul he was involved in the design of many aircraft, not least the Overstrand, Sidestrand, Defiant and the R101 airship, of which the company built the hull.

In 1941 North was Vice President of the Society of British Aerospace Companies (SBAC). He was made an honorary fellow of the Royal Aeronautical Society in May 1961 and he made CBE in 1962.

North married in 1922 Phyllis Margaret, daughter of Edward Huggins, Clerk of the Norwich Board of Guardians. The couple had two daughters.

John Dudley North died on 11 January 1968 at his home, Eversley, Oldbury, Bridgnorth, Shropshire, aged 75.
