= Oxford Gliding Club =

- Oxford Gliding Club
- Formation: 3 December 1937
- Founder: Robert Sutherland H H Price Gilbert Ryle and Frederick Lindemann
- Founded at: Cumnor Meadow (See Farmoor Reservoir)
- Coordinates: 51.881°N 1.229°W
- Members: ~100 Members
- Affiliations: British Gliding Association, Oxford University Gliding Club
- Website: www.oxfordgliding.com

Oxford Gliding Club (OGC) is a UK gliding club, and is one of the oldest still in operation in the UK. Currently it operates from RAF Weston-on-the-Green, north of Oxford. In 2012, the club celebrated its 75th anniversary.

== History ==
=== Formation ===
The pre-war ancestor to the club was the "Oxford University and City Gliding Club" which had its inaugural meeting at Christchurch College on Thursday 2 December 1937. The founders were predominantly Oxford academics, including author and anthropologist Robert Sutherland Rattray, Professor H H Price, philosopher Professor Gilbert Ryle and physicist Professor Frederick Lindemann, 1st Viscount Cherwell (later Lord Cherwell). They were helped in their search for a suitable site by aviator Amy Johnson. Lindemann went on to become scientific advisor to Winston Churchill and was paymaster general during World War II.

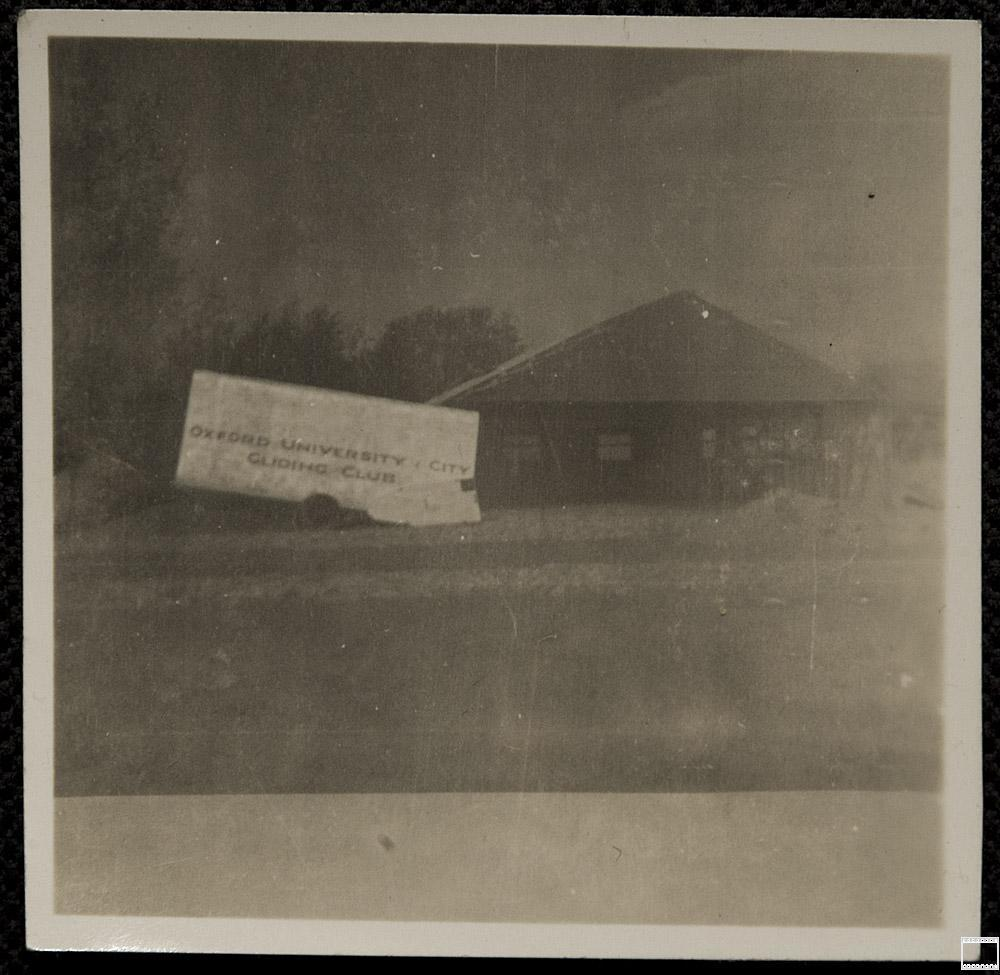
A photo of an original OU&CGC trailer

A meeting in early 1938 at Rhodes House considered the establishment of a club further. Attendees at this meeting included Joan Meakin, Mary Bailey, Amy Johnson and Naomi Heron-Maxwell.

=== Historical Operations ===
Flying began on Saturday, 7 May 1938, at a site known as Cumnor meadow, which is now on the bed of Farmoor Reservoir. The Club fleet consisted of two open primary gliders, one of which had a streamlined nacelle. Club members had to build an access road to the site, including a bridge over a ditch, and a basic hangar. The famous Austrian gliding pioneer, Robert Kronfeld became manager and CFI (Chief Flying Instructor) of the Club in June 1938. Club pilots and gliders took part in a public Air Show at RAF Upper Heyford in the summer of 1938. The Club moved from Cumnor to the Chiltern ridge at Aston Rowant, close to the Lambert Arms pub, for the 1939 season. The formation of the Oxford Gliding Co. Ltd. dates from 1939, including the original £4,000 share capital which is still on the books to this day. On the outbreak of war in 1939, all recreational aviation ceased, and the club was eventually reformed at Kidlington (London Oxford Airport)in 1951. An increase in powered aircraft activity at Kidlington resulted in the club relocating to RAF Weston-on-the-Green in 1956.

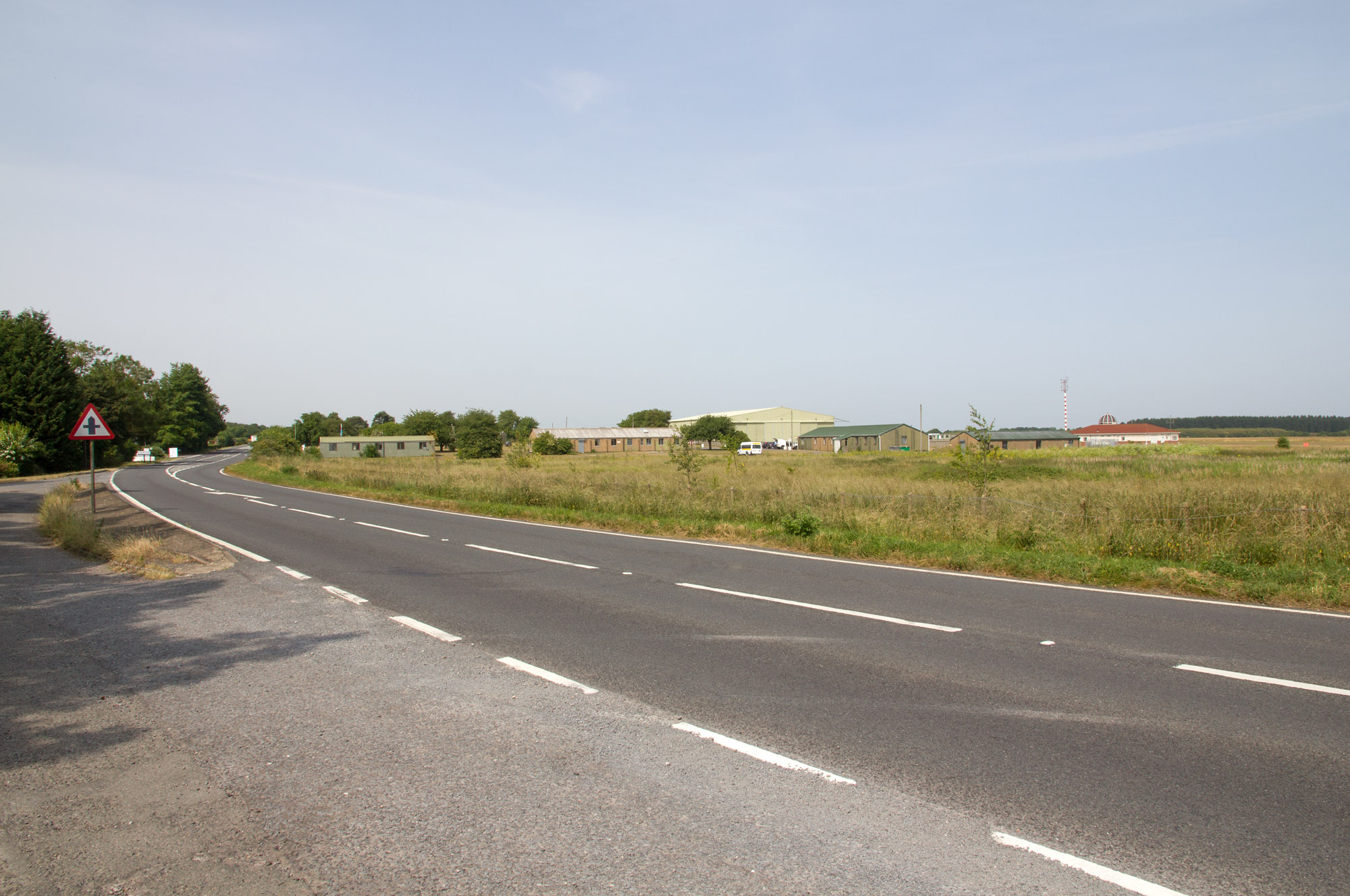
Weston-on-the-green Airfield, where OGC operates from.

=== Modern history ===
In July 2020, Oxford University Gliding Club returned to RAF Weston-on-the-Green. It operates as an independent organisation, however OGC facilitates its operations by providing the necessary operational capacity. It was a part of OGC until 1970 when it became a separate entity and moved to RAF Bicester under the predecessor to Windrushers Gliding Club, the RAF Gliding and Soaring Association.

== Club operations ==
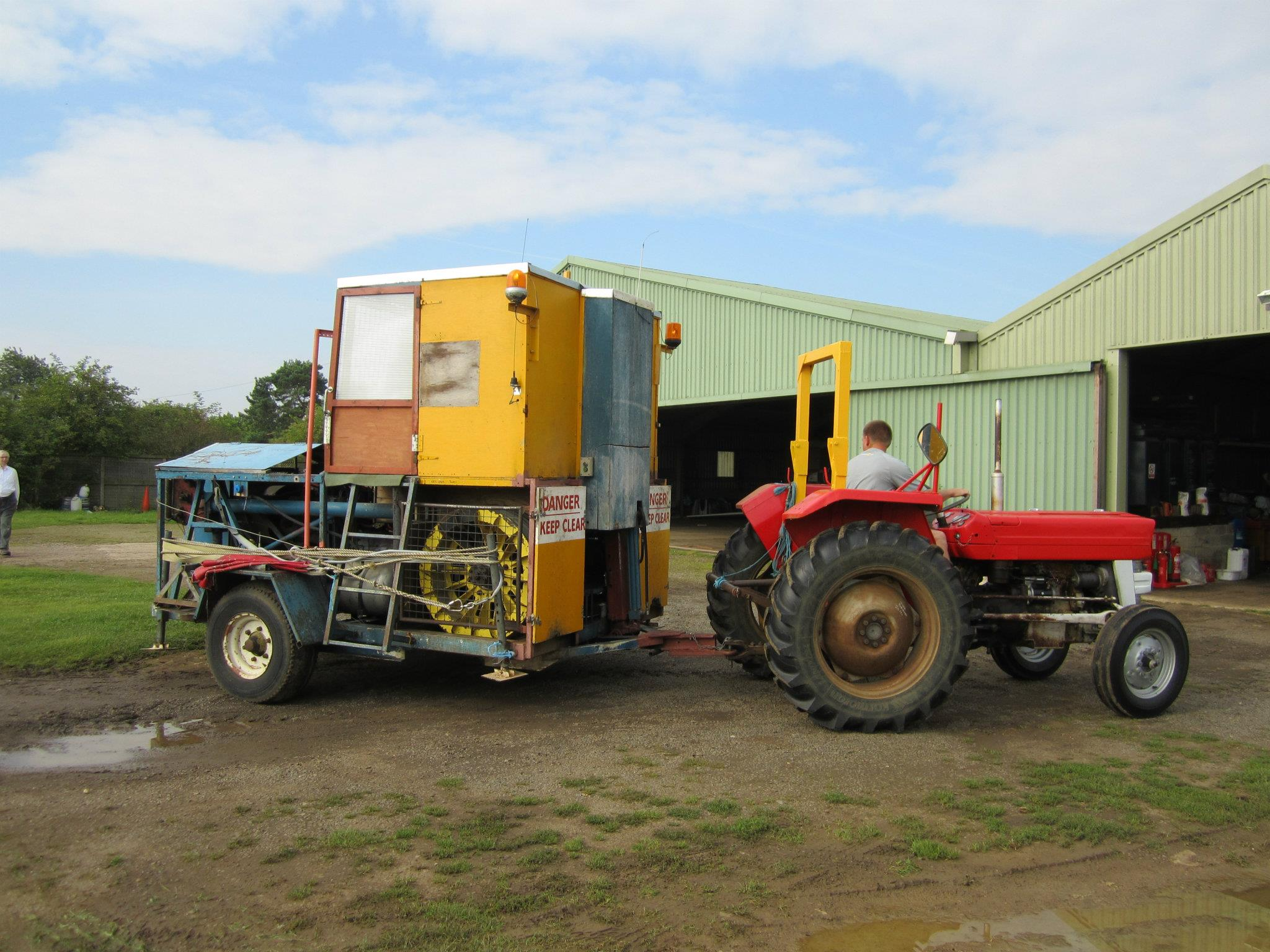
Oxford Gliding Club's previous home built winch

Whilst the club operates from an RAF airfield, it is not affiliated with nor is it a military organisation. The club operates mainly on weekends and bank holidays, however may occasionally operate on weekdays when the airfield is not otherwise in use, and when there are sufficient members available to commence operations. Like most UK gliding clubs, there are no paid employees and all members (subject to age and regulatory requirements) are trained in the various elements of airfield operation. In addition to the day-to-day operations, the club also undertakes various maintenance tasks including grass-cutting, aircraft inspection as per BGA requirements and general upkeep of the facilities. As part of the agreement with OUGC, members of each club are able to use the fleet of both clubs.

The club's instructors operate under the BGA training system, and do not charge for their time. This is common (but not universal) in gliding, unlike other general aviation areas.

In late 2023 the club upgraded to a new skylaunch winch, having previously operated a club manufactured winch. Both winches are powered by Liquefied petroleum gas, and are fitted with Dyneema cable, a lightweight manufactured Rope-like material. Dyneema is substantially lighter than the traditional multistrand steel cable, and enables higher launch heights, which in turn provide a longer flight. Combined with the longer than average "runs" at the club, the average winch launch height at OGC is in excess of 1400 feet, though with the right conditions launches have reached 2500 feet.

=== Glider fleet ===
OGC operates a varied fleet, consisting of both single and dual seat aircraft. In addition to the aircraft that it owns, it has access to the fleet of OUGC as part of the facilities agreement.

Dual Seat Aircraft
Aircraft Type	Number in Fleet	UK Registrations	Purpose
Schleicher ASK 21	1 (1 OUGC)	G-DEGZ (G-DESB)	Used as the predominant trainers for pre-solo students. Also used for post-solo training where the advanced characteristics of the DG505 are not required.
Glaser-Dirks DG-500	1	G-DEGZ	Used as the predominant trainers for pre-solo students. Also used for post-solo training where the advanced characteristics of the DG505 are not required.
Glaser-Dirks DG-505	1	G-CJSX	Used for flight experiences for the public, advanced, cross country or aerobatic training and gliding competition entry.
Slingsby T.21	1	WJ306	Vintage aircraft, primarily used for flight experiences for the public, fellow pilots and enthusiasts. Not used for training.

Single Seat Aircraft
Aircraft Type	Number in Fleet	UK Registrations	Purpose
Grob G102 Astir CS	3 (1 OUGC)	G-DDMH, G-CJUK, G-CHTD (G-CFEF)	Both aircraft are available to members for their own use, however pilots are generally sent solo on the K8 first as it is easier to handle during the transition between dual-seat and single-seat aircraft.
Schleicher K 8	1 (1 on loan from WGC)	G-DHFW (G-DEED)	Both aircraft are available to members for their own use, however pilots are generally sent solo on the K8 first as it is easier to handle during the transition between dual-seat and single-seat aircraft.
