= Windrushers Gliding Club =

Gliding club in Bicester, Oxfordshire, UK

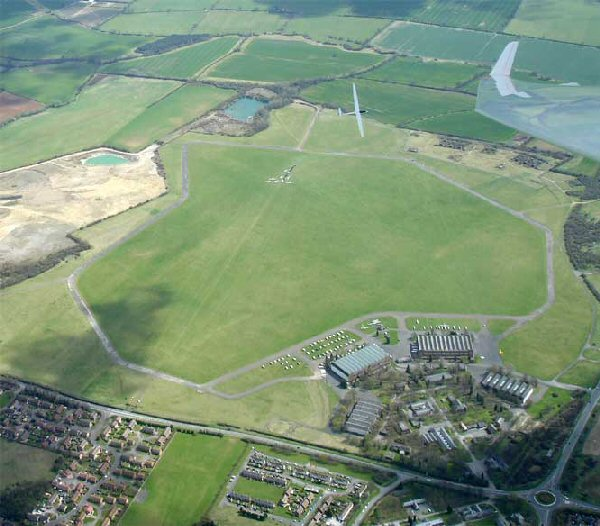
An image of Bicester Airfield, the site from which WGC operated.

Windrushers Gliding Club (also known as Bicester Gliding Club or simply "Bicester" within gliding circles) was a gliding club flying from Bicester Airfield in Oxfordshire until late June 2020. At its heyday, the club was one of the biggest gliding clubs in the UK, hosting various competitions throughout the year and maintaining the physical presence of the British Gliding Association's shop as well as numerous BGA staff members. The club operated seven days a week, with paid staff running various elements of the club's operations.

The club also hosted Oxford University Gliding Club at their site until Windrusher's closure, where OUGC then relocated to Oxford Gliding Club. During their tenancy, the gliding Varsity match between Oxford University Gliding Club and Cambridge University Gliding Club was held at Bicester Airfield every other year, the other years it was held at Gransden Lodge Airfield. Due to the COVID-19 pandemic these competitions were not held but in the early summer of 2022 the series was restarted and held at Oxford Gliding Club. Prior to its closure, and since operations ceased the club has maintained Community amateur sports club (CASC) status, a favourable tax status.

== Club history ==
=== Operational history ===
Windrushers originally started at operations at Little Rissington before moving to Bicester in 1956, later merging with the Royal Air Force Gliding & Soaring Association. In July 2004 the club was reformed as a separate entity after the RAFGSA moved to RAF Halton . The following year it hosted the UK Junior National Championship and its own Regional championship. It also later achieved the British Gliding Association's accreditation as a Junior Gliding Centre. During their operation, Windrushers hosted the following competitions;

Competition	Year held
Regional Gliding Championship	Annually 2005–2019
UK Junior Gliding National Championship	2005 and 2010
Standard Class National Championships	2006 and 2011
18 Metre Class National Championships	2008 and 2013
Club Class National Championships	2015
UK Gliding Grand Prix (18 metre class)	2016

=== Closure ===
After discussions that took place in early 2020, the new owners of Bicester Airfield, Bicester Heritage, sought to change the lease that allowed WGC to operate on the airfield. WGC would have lost privileges they enjoyed over other users of the airfield, which would have resulted in increased cost and reduced independence to run competitions or expand operations. Bicester Heritage also looked to take over WGC property within the airfield, including the recently renovated clubrooms and workshops. In July 2020, the club left the airfield, with members leaving for various different gliding clubs in the local area such as Oxford Gliding Club, Shenington Gliding Club at Shenington Airfield, Banbury Gliding Club and others further afield. The club states its lease was terminated on December 12, 2019, and it would have been impossible for them to stay at the airfield under the new proposed terms, specifically that the club would have to book the airfield for the day if they wanted to fly and would become just another "airfield user" rather than the leaseholder.

==== Club fleet ====
When the club ceased operations, the club's committee maintained that it was not being dissolved and was instead entering a state of "hibernation", which meant they did not need to follow CASC guidelines on disposing of assets (such as aircraft) to other eligible CASC organisations in the local area. The club's interpretation of this concept meant that their fleet was unavailable for use by either the club's own members or other suitable CASC clubs in the local area.

In the company accounts ending June 2022 show that in the previous year the committee had come to the conclusion that no suitable future site could be established to continue flying operations, and as such the committee had elected to sell off their assets (namely the aircraft). It is unclear how this conclusion was in keeping with the CASC guidelines, and no minutes of the committee meeting have been publicly distributed. The funds raised by the sale of the assets of Windrushers Gliding Club are being held in trust by the British Gliding Association, with the latter stating that work is ongoing to establish how to dispose of these funds appropriately and legally.

Previous fleet:

Glider type	Number owned and Registration Marks	Fate post closure
Alexander-Schleicher ASK 13	5 (CCZ, HAL, HMV, JXM, KKR)	G-DCCZ sold to Midlands (Long Mynd) Gliding Club; G-DHAL sold to Dumfries and District Gliding Club; G-CHMV sold to Bidford Flying Club; G-CJXM sold to private owner; G-CKKR sold to private owner
Grob Twin III	2 (PX, XH)	G-CLPX sold to South Wales Gliding Club; G-CLXH sold to Scottish Gliding Club
Alexander-Schleicher K 8	2 (EED, GD)	G-DEED sold to Oxford Gliding Club; GD - sold to an unknown party
Grob Astir CS	G-DDFR	Sold to Southdown Gliding Club
Scheibe Falke 2000 Motor Glider	G-CFMW	Sold to a private syndicate, based at Hinton-in-the-Hedges Airfield
Tug aircraft Piper PA-25 Pawnee	G-BFPR	Sold to Peterborough and Spalding Gliding Club
Tug aircraft Robin DR400	G-OBIC	Sold to Norfolk Gliding Club

The fate of the aircraft has been obtained from the CAA registration authority, as no minutes or details have been published by Windrushers Gliding Club since its dissolution.
