= RAF Weston-on-the-Green =

Royal Air Force station in Oxfordshire, England

RAF Weston-on-the-Green
- Part of RAF Brize Norton
- Near Bicester, Oxfordshire in England
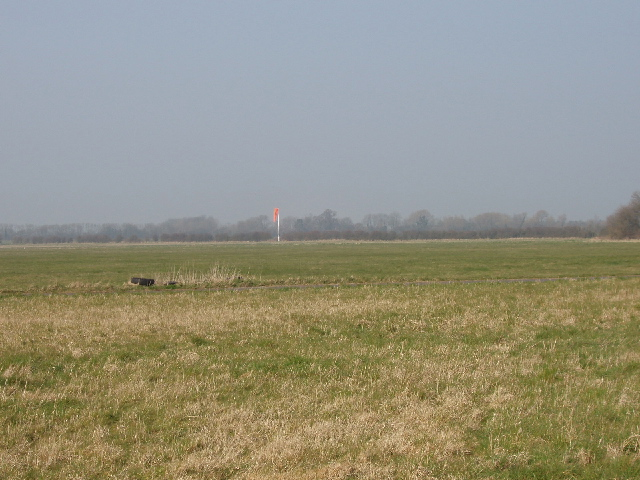
- Airfield at RAF Weston-on-the-Green

Site information
- Type: Military Parachute Drop Zone
- Owner: Ministry of Defence
- Operator: Royal Air Force
- Controlled by: No. 2 Group (Air Combat Support)

Location
- Shown within Oxfordshire
- Coordinates: 51°52′45″N 001°13′35″W
- Area: 132 hectares

Site history
- Built: 1916
- In use: 1916–present

Airfield information
- Elevation: 86 metres (282 ft) AMSL
Runways
| Direction | Length and surface |
|---|---|
| 05/23 | 1,060 metres (3,478 ft) Grass |
| 09/27 | 1,140 metres (3,740 ft) Grass |
Helipads
| Number | Length and surface |
|---|---|
| 01 | 30 metres (98 ft) Concrete |

RAF Weston-on-the-Green is a Royal Air Force station that was redeveloped after the Great War period. Much demolition took place (including the original 1916/1917 hangars). The former RFC Officers and Sergeant's messes are located on the opposite side of the road, and are now in commercial use. It is one of the few remaining active RAF bases with some original pre-RAF buildings. The station is located near the village of Weston-on-the-Green in Oxfordshire, England.

The grass airfield at Weston is used as a drop zone (DZ) for static line and free-fall parachute training by the Airborne Delivery Wing at nearby RAF Brize Norton and the wider British Armed Forces.

== History ==
The airfield was used for the launch of the first modern hot air balloon in the UK in 1967, called the Bristol Belle. The airfield is the 3rd largest grass airfield still in operational use in the UK. It was previously used for the Hotspur gliders and Bristol Aircraft.

== Current use ==
The station comes under the control of the nearby RAF Brize Norton, home of the Airborne Delivery Wing, formerly known as the No.1 Parachute Training School RAF. The grass airfield at Weston is used regularly as a drop zone for military static line and freefall parachute training for the UK military, using Skyvan and A400M Atlas aircraft based at RAF Brize Norton. No military aircraft are based at RAF Weston-on-the-Green and the airfield is staffed only part-time by RAF personnel.

Sport skydiving also takes place at RAF Weston-on-the-Green under the auspices of the Royal Air Force Sports Parachute Association using civilian aircraft based on the airfield.

There was, until 2011, a commercial parachute club, Skydive Weston, based at the field. However that was forced to move its base of operations away from Weston by MoD cuts. Some of the original buildings still stand, and the Skyvan aircraft originally used is now used during weekdays.

=== Oxford Gliding Club ===
Among the various organisations that use the airfield, Oxford Gliding Club use it now. They operate on the weekends with various club gliders, and about 30 private gliders. The club owns two Schleicher ASK 21, 1 K 8s, 4 Grob Astir, one DG-505 a Slingsby T.21 and a Glaser-Dirks DG-500. The club uses the hangar in the northern side of the airfield, however the launch point varies according to the wind. The club celebrated its 75th anniversary in 2012. It is one of the oldest gliding clubs in the country.

== Current aircraft based at WOTG ==
| Aircraft type | Use/organization | Registration |
|---|---|---|
| DG-505 | Oxford Gliding Club | G-CJSX (DG-505) G-CGBZ (DG-500) |
| Schleicher ASK 21 | Oxford Gliding Club | G-DEGZ, G-DESB |
| Grob Astir | Oxford Gliding Club | G-DDMH, 544, G-DHTD, G-CFEF |
| Schleicher K 8 | Oxford Gliding Club | G-DEED on loan from Bicester GC |
| Slingsby T.21 | Oxford Gliding Club | WJ306 |

== RAF units and aircraft ==
| Unit | Dates | Aircraft | Variant | Notes |
|---|---|---|---|---|
| No. 2 Squadron RAF | 1919–1920 | Armstrong Whitworth FK.8 | | |
| No. 18 Squadron RAF | 1919 | None | | Cadre only. |
| No. 90 Squadron RAF | 1939 | Bristol Blenheim | I | |
| No. 20 (Pilots) Advanced Flying Unit RAF | 1943–1945 | | | Based at RAF Kidlington used Weston-on-the-Green as a Relief Landing Ground |
| No. 15 Flying Training School RAF | 1940–1941 | | | Based at RAF Kidlington used Weston-on-the-Green as a Relief Landing Ground |
| No. 130 Gliding School RAF | 1951–1955 | Slingsby Cadet | I, II and TX3 | |
| No. 13 Operational Training Unit RAF | 1940 | Bristol Blenheim | | Based at RAF Bicester used Weston-on-the-Green as a Relief Landing Ground |
| No. 28 Training Depot Station RAF | 1918–1919 | | | |

== See also ==
- List of Royal Air Force stations
