= Naomi Heron-Maxwell =

British parachutist and glider (1913–1983)

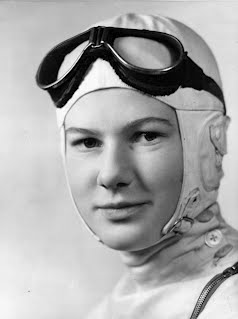
- Heron-Maxwell in 1935
- Born: 25 June 1913; Folkestone
- Died: 1983 (aged 69–70)
- Occupations: Parachutist, Air Transport Auxiliary pilot

Helen Naomi Heron-Maxwell (25 June 1913 – 1983) was a British parachutist and glider pilot in the 1930s. She was the first female glider pilot in the United Kingdom to achieve the Silver-C badge. She promoted gliding and helped establish gliding clubs. She was a ferry pilot for the Air Transport Auxiliary in the Second World War.

== Early life ==
Helen Naomi Heron-Maxwell, known as Naomi, was born on 25 June 1913 in Folkestone. She was the daughter of a baronet, Sir Ivor Heron-Maxwell, eighth Baronet, and Lady Heron-Maxwell. She was the second child and second daughter of four children; her younger brother Patrick was the ninth baronet. Her father died in 1928 when Naomi was a teenager. The family had been wealthy, but were less so after his death, and Naomi got a job as a secretary. She "could not cook, nor sew, and she refused to be presented at court".

== Flying ==
In 1934, aged 20, Heron-Maxwell took flying lessons on a Gipsy Moth at Abridge Flying Club, Essex.

== Alan Cobham's Flying Circus ==
Heron-Maxwell joined Alan Cobham's Flying Circus in 1935 as a parachutist. She had met a parachutist, John Tranum, during her flying lessons. "Sir Alan had heard her on the radio and saw mileage in having a woman parachutist to pull in the crowds. Naomi was equally aware of her marketing potential". Her mother "played an April Fools' trick on her, faking a letter from Cobham to say that he "will no longer be requiring your services owing to what he has read in the papers"". Despite this, Heron-Maxwell met Pauline Gower to discuss signing up with Cobham, and got some useful information about terms from Gower.

Her colleagues in the Circus included another woman aviator, Joan Meakin, who was a friend of hers. Heron-Maxwell's reasons for taking the job are variously given as to do "for fun and the thrill of doing something dangerous", to show that the parachute is safe and "no one should hesitate to use it if the emergency arises", and to earn money. The press called Heron-Maxwell "the only professional lady parachutist", "Britain's only lady parachutist", "the girl with the steadiest nerve in Britain". She lent her name to advertisements for Ovaltine.

Heron-Maxwell made around a hundred parachute jumps. Her colleague Ivor Price was killed in May 1935, when they were jumping from the same aircraft and his parachute did not open. Following this, Heron-Maxwell also had a near-accident following a change of equipment; she had previously used the Russell "Lobe" parachute. "On her first free fall with the new equipment, she succeeded in missing the rip-cord handle, and her very low opening was not appreciated by the management. The crowd had kittens all over the place". Another colleague, Frederick Marsland, was killed in a separate incident, and Heron-Maxwell's then boyfriend asked her not to perform again. He died in a car crash not long afterwards, and she made no further jumps.

== Gliding ==
Heron-Maxwell learnt to glide first in 1936 at Greisheim in Germany, then with Fred Slingsby in a Falcon III, and then in a Buzzard glider at Darmstadt. She was the first British woman to achieve the Silver-C badge. Her final qualification for the certificate came during a flight in which she was lost in cloud for three hours: "It was great fun outside the cloud, but inside the cloud it was not at all pleasant to be hurled up and down in a thunderstorm without being able to see anything".

Heron-Maxwell translated Wolf Hirth's Die Hohe Schule des Segelfluges from German as The Art of Soaring Flight, published in 1939.

In the United Kingdom, she worked as a gliding instructor at clubs including Cambridge University Gliding Club and Yorkshire Gliding Club. She helped to establish Oxford University Gliding Club and gave lectures to promote the foundation of other clubs, such as Bristol Gliding Club. In a lecture at Hull Literary and Philosophical Society, "With slides, diagrams and film, as well as commentary, lucid and unemotional, she indicated that gliding was a science, based on cool calculation, though always strangely fascinating and, in the ultimate, uncanny". Heron-Maxwell wrote articles about gliding and gave radio talks. She wrote that "as [gliding] is one of the few sports where, once the preliminary training is over, men and women compete on an equal basis, neither having an advantage over the other, more and more women are being attracted to it".

== Air Transport Auxiliary ==
Heron-Maxwell was a ferry pilot in the Air Transport Auxiliary during the Second World War, between 1942 and 1945.

== Personal life ==
Heron-Maxwell married Francis Cecil Howard Allen in 1938, but he died the following year. She moved to California, married Howard D Thomas in 1957 and had a child in 1958. She died in 1983.
