= 2025 Bicester Motion fire =

Fatal fire at a hangar in Bicester, Oxfordshire

Bicester Motion fire
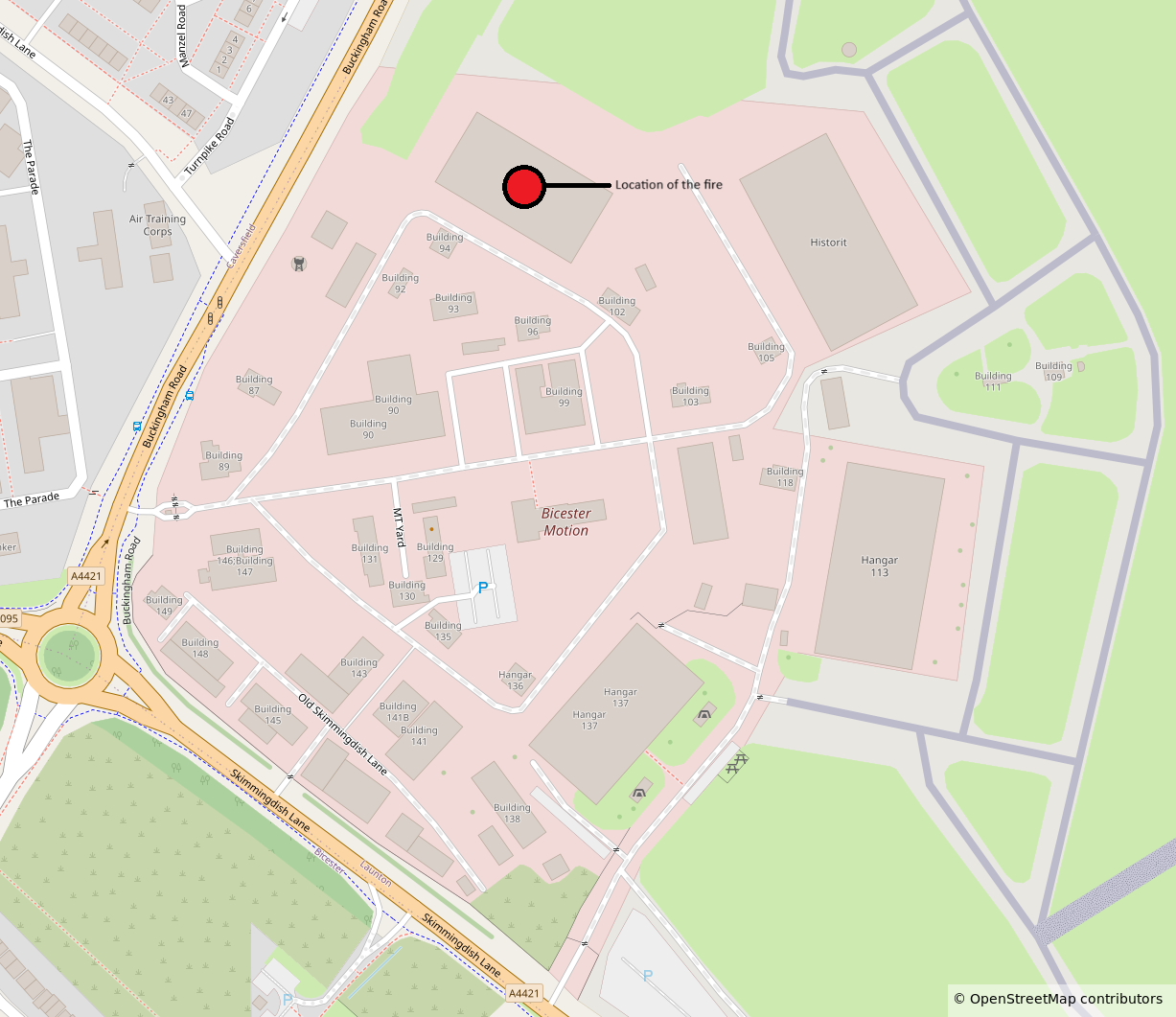
- Map of the Bicester Motion site, with fire location marked
- Date: 15 May 2025
- Time: Fire started c. 18:39 (BST)
- Location: Bicester Airfield, Oxfordshire, England; 51.9165°N 1.1407°W
- Deaths: 3
- Injuries: 2

The Bicester Motion fire broke out at around 18:39 BST on 15 May 2025, at Hangar 79 at the Bicester Motion site on Bicester Airfield in Bicester, Oxfordshire. As of August 2025, the cause of the fire was unknown. The hangar held a variety of vintage vehicles.

The fire killed three people – two firefighters and a member of the public. Two other firefighters were taken to hospital with serious injuries.

== Incident ==
=== Beginnings ===
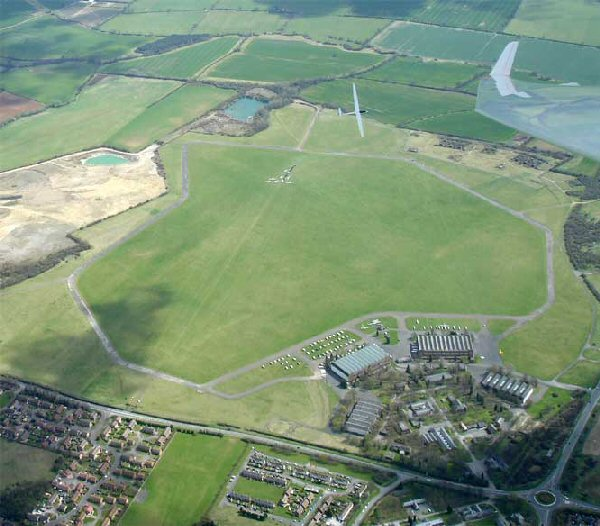
Bicester Airfield in Bicester, Oxfordshire (pictured 2005)

The fire broke out at Hangar 79 at around 18:39 BST on 15 May 2025. The fire was initially attended to by ten fire and rescue crews. Local residents were advised by Oxfordshire Fire and Rescue Service to stay inside and keep doors and windows closed. The affected hangar held Audrey, a restored Bedford 1960s mobile cinema bus, and a 1968 Bristol RELH Red & White coach, along with other vintage vehicles.

=== Initial statement ===
Bicester Motion released a statement on 15 May, saying they "are aware of an incident", and that emergency services were attending the site. At 01:34 on 16 May, saying they are "working closely with the emergency services", and that the site was to be closed on 16 May, and over the weekend of 17–18 May, with a further statement to come out "as appropriate".

=== Deaths and injuries ===
Two firefighters and a member of public were killed in the blaze. The firefighters were later named as Jennie Logan (born 1994 or 1995), a member of the Oxfordshire Fire and Rescue Service, and Martyn Sadler (born 1986 or 1987), also a member of the Oxfordshire Fire and Rescue Service as well as the London Fire Brigade. The member of the public was a man from Bicester, David Chester (born 1967 or 1968), who worked at the Bicester Motion site, and ran the family business Chester & Sons. It was later revealed via post-mortem that all three died from multiple traumatic injuries, which initial investigations show were likely caused by the collapse of the building.

Two firefighters were also brought to hospital with serious injuries. They were reported conscious and in a stable condition. They have since been discharged from hospital. The council later stated that the fire was "under control", with the number of fire and rescue crews remaining on site reduced to four.

=== Further statements ===
A further statement was released by Bicester Motion at around 10:00 on 16 May, which stated that they were "deeply saddened" by the news of the deaths of Logan and Sadler, and Chester – who they referred to as "a close friend of the site".

They released another statement at around 20:10, referring to the statement by Thames Valley Police, as well as extending their "heartfelt condolences" to the families of the Logan, Sadler, and Chester. They said that Chester "had a long history with the estate", and said they "cherish" him, and that he "will be sorely missed".

Bicester Motion revealed at the end of July 2025 that the hangar affected by the fire, the grade II listed Hangar 79, was to be demolished, due to the significant damage caused by the fire. Work is set to start on 6 August, and last for around four months.

=== Investigation ===
Thames Valley Police stated that they "have commenced an unexplained death investigation". They said it is "currently not a criminal investigation" but that they would "follow the evidence as our enquiries continue". Police remained at the scene over the few days following the fire. Onsite investigations by the police, fire service and Health and Safety Executive (HSE) concluded on 10 June 2025. However, as of 31 July 2025, enquiries by all three are still ongoing. The inquest has been adjourned until 25 November.

On 6 July 2026, Thames Valley Police confirmed that their investigation had concluded, with the ongoing matter being under the remit of the HSE. No criminal charges are being brought against any party.

On 8 September 2026, a pre-inquest review hearing was held on Oxford. During this, senior coroner Darren Salter said that there was CCTV footage which showed that hangar 79's doors had collapsed "within six or seven minutes" of the firefighters' arrival. He said that there would be another pre-inquest review held, and that the full jury inquest is not likely to start until the start of summer 2027.

== Reactions and tributes ==
There have been multiple tributes for Logan, Sadler, and Chester. Oxfordshire Chief Fire Officer Rob MacDougall announced the deaths, speaking with "a heavy heart". Thames Valley Police assistant chief constable Tim Metcalfe said the deaths were "an absolute tragedy". Flowers were laid near the Bicester Motion entrance. Flags were flown at half mast at Garth House "as an expression of our sorrow and respect for those who lost their lives".

Church services and a two-minute silence were held. Firefighters held a guard of honour. Steve Wright, general secretary of the Fire Brigades Union, sent a message of condolence on behalf of the union. On 22 May, Bicester Motion released an additional update to their statement, with a tribute from their CEO, Daniel Geoghegan. Geoghegan said that Bicester Motion are "grateful to the emergency services" and that their "thoughts are also with the two firefighters still in hospital".

A funeral procession was held for Logan in Bicester on 14 June. The funeral for Chester took place on 8 July in Tackley. A full ceremonial fire service funeral was held for Sadler on 31 July, also in Bicester.

== See also ==
- List of British firefighters killed in the line of duty
