= Cambridge Gliding Centre =

Cambridge Gliding Centre is a gliding club based near Cambridge in the United Kingdom on the Bedfordshire/Cambridgeshire county border. Nearby major towns include Bedford, Cambourne, Huntingdon, Royston, Sandy, St Ives and St Neots.

The club is based at Gransden Lodge Airfield, where it moved to from Duxford Aerodrome in October 1991.

Formerly known as the Cambridge University Gliding Club, it became known as the Cambridge Gliding Club in the mid-nineties. In 2006 the club began trading as the Cambridge Gliding Centre.

The Cambridge Gliding Centre provides flying lessons, and 'learn to fly' courses for aspiring glider pilots, along with advanced training, e.g. aerobatics, and conversion courses for more experienced pilots. Experience trial flight gift vouchers are also available.

Some club members are record-holding pilots.

The Cambridge Gliding Centre operates a fleet of four two-seat trainer and four single seater gliders, has access to a motor glider, state-of-the-art simulator and facilities for both winch launch and aerotow operations.

== Notable staff ==
- Naomi Heron-Maxwell was an instructor in the 1930s.
