= Bicester Airfield =

Bicester Aerodrome
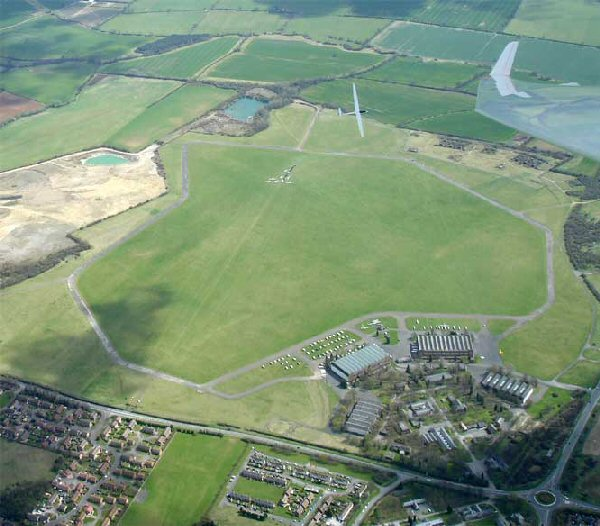
- Bicester Airfield from above.
- IATA: none; ICAO: EGDD

Summary
- Owner: Bicester Motion Ltd
- Operator: Bicester Motion Ltd
- Location: Bicester, Oxfordshire
- Elevation AMSL: 267 ft (81 m)
- Coordinates: 51°54′58″N 1°08′07″W

Map
- Location in Oxfordshire

Runways
Direction	Length		Surface
Direction	m	ft	Surface
06/24	650	2,133	Grass
14/34	790	2,592	Grass

Bicester Aerodrome, formerly RAF Bicester, is a private airfield on the outskirts of Bicester, Oxfordshire, England.

The location of the first flight of the prototype Handley Page Halifax in 1939, it was used by the Royal Air Force until 2004. Originally built as a bomber station as part of the 1920s Home Defence Expansion Scheme, the airfield consists of 400 acres (160 ha) of well-drained short-mown grass, with two mown grass runways of 06/24 (650 m (2,133 ft)) and 16/34 (790 m (2,592 ft)) long. The surface is bumpy in places, due to collapsing field drains, requiring care on the part of pilots operating aircraft in those areas.

== History ==
In 1911 Captain H. P. P. Reynolds flew from Oxford in a Bristol Boxkite biplane and touched down near Launton. His rural landing is thought to be the first time an aircraft skimmed the grass at this location.

Organised flying began in 1916 when a Training Depot was established. In January 1917, the Royal Flying Corps (RFC) moved into the site, then 180 acres (0.73 km^{2}), with the arrival of 118 night bomber squadron. Canvas-covered Bessonneau hangars were used until more substantial aircraft sheds were built.

In November 1918, No. 44 Training Station Depot arrived, followed in 1919 by 5 Squadron, flying Bristol F.2 Fighters returning from France, having flown in the First World War. All the squadrons disbanded by 1920, and the airfield was closed in 1920 after being used briefly as a clearing centre for repatriated soldiers.

In 1925, work began on redeveloping the site as a bomber station, and flying began again in January 1928. Various large RAF bombers operated from the field, including the Vickers Virginia. Other aircraft included Hawker Horsleys and, in 1935, Hawker Harts arrived. In November 1932, the only RAF squadron of Boulton Paul Sidestrands arrived, replaced by Overstrands n 1936.

Development of the station continued throughout this period, with many new buildings being erected. This included the construction of a connection from the nearby 'Varsity Line' railway to supply the airfield.

=== Second World War ===
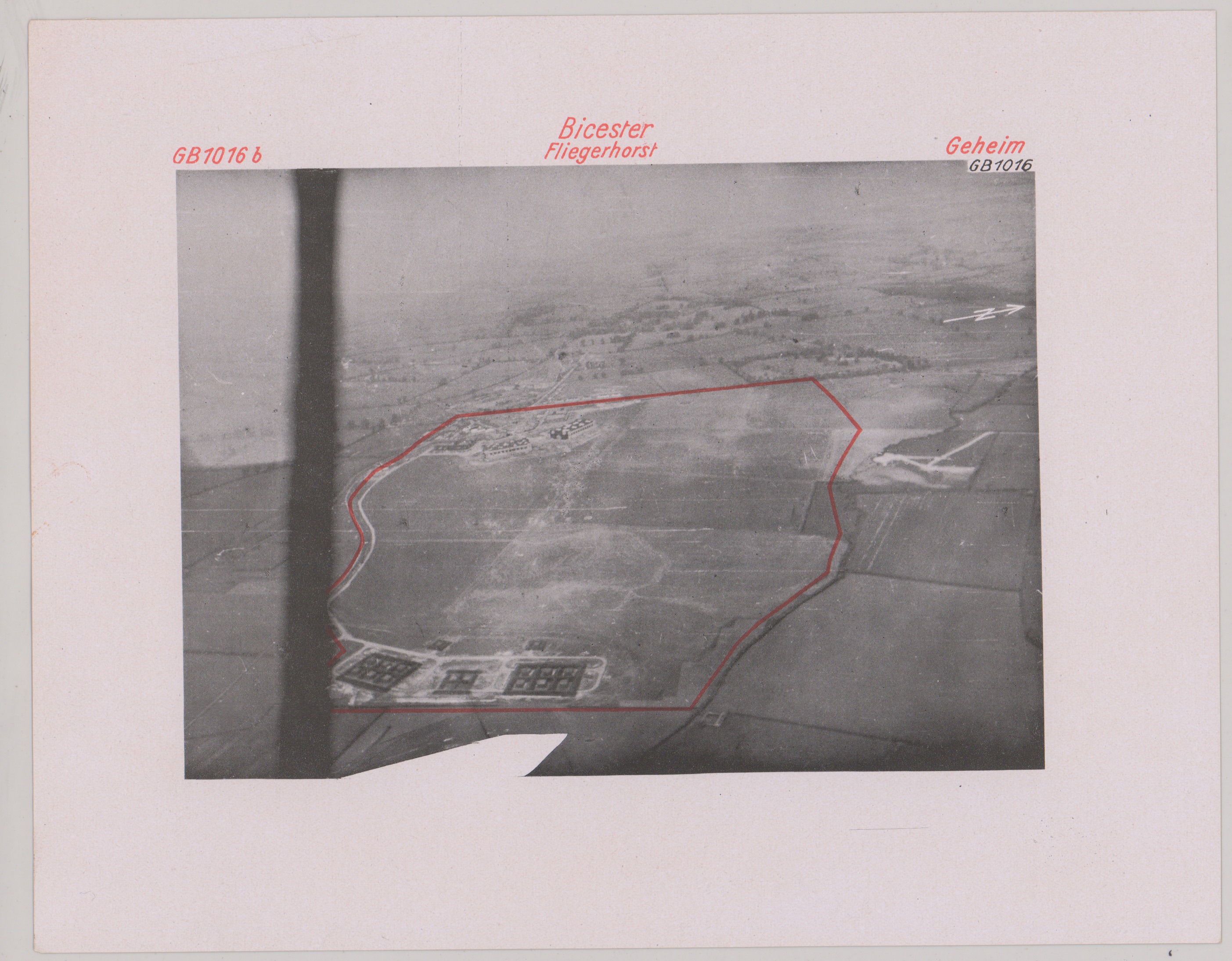
Photo of Bicester Airfield by the German Luftwaffe, 1939

In 1937/1938, two squadrons of the new Bristol Blenheim bomber arrived, followed in 1939 by two more squadrons with Supermarine Spitfires and Avro Anson support aircraft, forming the No. 1 Camouflage Unit RAF. The aircraft were used for training, with no operational sorties being flown from the field.

However, the Winter War of 1939 between Finland and Russia had proved that 18 Finnish Bristol Blenheim Bombers (delivered in 1937) were insufficient and further air support from Britain was needed. Due to Britain's delicate political situation with Russia, the delivery of such important equipment was to be kept secret.

The aircraft had been stripped of armaments and non-essential equipment, with all RAF livery removed and replaced with the blue swastika, the insignia of the Finnish Airforce. This insignia had been hastily whitewashed over to disguise it for the journey. At 6 am on the 23rd February 1940 all twelve aircraft took off for the first leg from RAF Bicester to Dyce Airport at Aberdeen in Scotland. The rain had removed the white wash, making them more visible and their mission more dangerous than ever. However, after hopping from RAF Bicester to Aberdeen, Stavanger (Norway), Vasteras (Sweden) and finally landing safely at Lake Juva in Finland, all twelve aircraft successfully arrived.

Later in 1939, having been built in Cricklewood just before war broke out, the first prototype Handley Page Halifax was taken by road to RAF Bicester and assembled in secret there before the company's chief test pilot Major Jim Cordes and flight test observer E A 'Ginger' Wright made its first flight on 25 October 1939. The type went on to become the first four-engined bomber to drop bombs on Germany in the Second World War.

In July 1940, the second RAF Bomber Command Training Group (No. 7 Group RAF) was formed, with its headquarters at RAF Bicester. This was required due to a demand in operational training, supplying squadrons of No. 2 Group. No. 6 (T) Group RAF and No. 92 (OTU) Group RAF were both connected to the airfield.

Throughout the war, RAF Bicester was used as a training centre, and in April 1940 became home to No. 13 Operational Training Unit RAF, under the control of RAF Bomber Command. In June 1943, the unit transferred to No. 9 Group RAF, RAF Fighter Command, flying Spitfires and de Havilland Mosquitos. Although no offensive missions were flown, flights were not without risk. On 8 April 1940, 13 OTU experienced its first loss. On 6 December 1941, a Blenheim stalled on take-off, killing all three crew members. Just four days later, a second Blenheim crashed in an identical accident, again with no survivors.

=== Squadrons ===
- No. 2 Squadron RAF
- No. 5 Squadron RAF
- No. 12 Squadron RAF
- No. 33 Squadron RAF
- No. 48 Squadron RAF
- No. 90 Squadron RAF
- No. 100 Squadron RAF
- No. 101 Squadron RAF
- No. 104 Squadron RAF
- No. 108 Squadron RAF
- No. 142 Squadron RAF
- No. 144 Squadron RAF
- No. 217 Squadron RAF

=== Units ===
- No. 2 Group Pool RAF (September 1939 - April 1940)
- No. 3 Maintenance Unit RAF (May 1947 - May 1958)
- No. 7 Group Communication Flight RAF (September 1941 - May 1942) became No. 92 Group Communication Flight RAF (May - September 1942)
- No. 34 Air Stores Park RAF (May 1944 - August 1945)
- No. 40 (Maintenance) Group RAF (February 1947 - July 1961)
- No. 44 Training Station (August 1919 - )
- No. 246 Maintenance Unit RAF (January 1945 - April 1949)
- No. 282 Maintenance Unit RAF (August - November 1952)
- No. 307 Ferry Training Unit RAF (December 1942 - February 1943)
- No. 420 Repair & Salvage Unit RAF (February 1944)
- Beam Approach Calibration Flight RAF (July - November 1942) became No. 1551 Beam Approach Calibration Flight RAF (November 1942 - April 1943)
- Ferry Training Flight, Bicester RAF (October 1941 - January 1942) became No. 1442 (Ferry Training) Flight RAF (January - August 1942)
- Aircraft of the Oxford University Air Squadron (1959-75)
- 'B' Flight (Calibration) from the Signals Development Unit RAF (April - August 1943)
- 'C' Flight (O.D.P) from the Signals Development Unit RAF (April - August 1943)
- Transport Command Parachute Servicing Unit RAF

=== Post-war ===
At the end of 1944, Bicester became a non-flying unit, used for maintenance, and later as a Motor Transport depot. In 1953, No. 71 Maintenance Unit RAF arrived, that salvaged, repaired, and then transported damaged aircraft.

In 1956, Windrushers Gliding Club arrived, having moved from Little Rissington, and gliding began at the field. In 1963, the Royal Air Force Gliding & Soaring Association (RAFGSA) began using the site, eventually merging with Windrushers Gliding Club. Gliding has taken place at the airfield since 1956. In 1966, No. 1 LAA Squadron RAF Regiment arrived from RAAF Butterworth, Malaysia, along with No. 26 LAA Squadron RAF Regiment − from RAF Changi, Singapore.

in 1965, Queen Elizabeth II visited RAF Bicester with Prince Philip, Duke of Edinburgh. The visiting Royals were given a full tour of the site before watching various demonstrations of aircraft at the airfield.

In 1976, the RAF ceased to use the airfield as a military base, but still maintained staff there to run the gliding training operation as adventure training for servicemen. In the mid-1980s, the USAF briefly used the Technical and Domestic Area for storage. In 1982 the USAF created a wartime contingency hospital with 500 beds and all ancillary medical services using restored RAF World War II dormitories. There were between 12 and 20 USAF personnel stationed on site until the beginning of Operation Desert Storm, when they were augmented by 1200 USAF medical personnel from USAF medical Center, Wilford Hall, Lackland Air Force Base, Texas. The facility was used to treat minor physical injuries and possible PTSD patients. The unit was deactivated in 1992. Between 1979 and 1992, the RAFGSA Centre allowed US servicemen from RAF Upper Heyford to become members. US servicemen, from the US Armed Forces family housing next to the airfield in Bicester, learnt to fly at Bicester as a result.

In 1990, during Operation Desert Shield, the USAF deployed medical personnel to the site, and equipped a number of buildings in both the Technical and Domestic area as a hospital. This was done in anticipation of large numbers of casualties that never materialised, during the 1991 First Persian Gulf War. The blood fridges installed by the USAF still exist in Hangar 109 along with a large amount of graffiti relating to the servicemen based there, 109 is now used as a car storage facility.

In 1997 the Ministry of Defence placed the Married Quarter sites at RAF Bicester up for disposal by formal tender. The successful buyer was the Welbeck Estate Group from the City of Wells, Somerset, this being their 35th successful acquisition of military sites from the Ministry of Defence since 1980. They renamed the NCO Married Quarters 'The 'Rowans'.

== Recent History ==
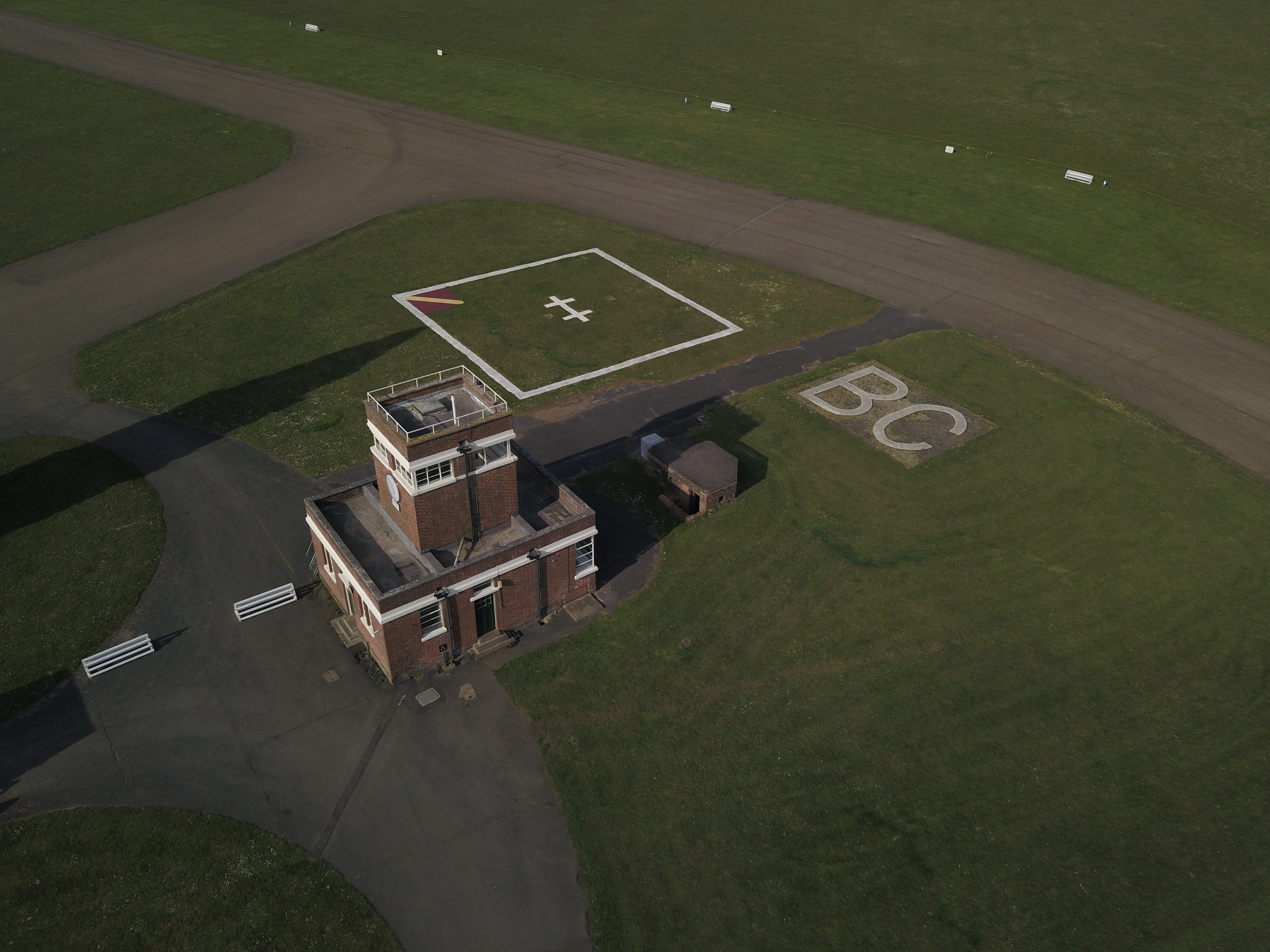
The Watch Office (it pre-dates radio control, therefore is a Watch Office but commonly referred to as a Control Tower) at Bicester Heritage, 2020

The airfield is a substantially unmodified pre-war RAF station with 19 listed buildings. The brick-built 1934 "Fort" type 1959/34 control tower survives, as do the two C-type and two A-type aircraft hangars.

During the late 1990s, The Welbeck Estate Group/Hodge Group acquired 300 post-war and modern Officers and NCO married quarters on the Stratton Fields and The Rowans housing estate. In the late 1990s, plans were proposed to develop the airfield for housing and industry, but they were abandoned due to strong local opposition and the historic nature of the site. In 2002, Cherwell District Council designated the aerodrome as a Conservation Area.

In June 2004, the RAF Gliding and Soaring Association moved to RAF Halton. The airfield became home to both Windrushers Gliding Club (reformed in July 2004) who leased the site from the MOD until 2013, with Oxford University Gliding Club and, for a few years, Cranfield University Gliding Club, as sub-sections within the Windrushers club. The club continued to operate from Bicester along with the Oxford University club, but after the existing lease expired the Club went into hibernation on 30 June 2020. At the same time, the Oxford University group moved to Weston on the Green, rejoining Oxford Gliding Club after over 40 years at Bicester.

In 2012, further plans for housing were refused permission by Cherwell District Council.

== Present Ownership ==
=== Bicester Motion ===
In March 2013 Bicester Airfield was acquired from the Ministry of Defence by Bicester Motion Limited which has created the UK's first business park dedicated to historic motoring and aviation, named Bicester Motion. Bicester Motion aims to bring together the UK's cottage industry of automotive specialists in order to promote not just the preservation but, specifically, the use of historic motor cars.

In 2023 Bicester Motion celebrated its 10th anniversary at the former RAF Bicester aerodrome. The established business campus is home to fifty businesses, from the governing body of British Motorsport, Motorsport UK, to Formula E team NEOM McLaren Electric Racing, the Sauber F1 team's (soon to be Audi F1 Team) Technology Centre, and EV manufacturer Polestar's UK HQ, to many other individual, highly skilled manufacturing and engineering firms within the automotive sector.

The majority of the historic buildings in the former-RAF Technical Site have been restored for occupation by automotive tenants. In the ten years of operation to 2023, the Conservation Area of RAF Bicester has been removed from the Historic England 'Heritage At Risk Register', and has since gone on to win multiple awards including Conservation and Regeneration at the SECBE Constructing Excellence Awards. The second phase of restored buildings were unveiled by Prince Richard, The Duke of Gloucester. The site has appeared as a film location in Darkest Hour and The Imitation Game.

In 2018 Bicester Motion achieved unanimous planning approval from Cherwell District Council for the construction of eight new buildings to the southern edge of the former RAF Technical Site, adjacent to Skimmingdish Lane. The £10.4m project was completed in 2020 and now houses many modern automotive specialist businesses, including synthetic fuel manufacturer ZERO Petroleum, electric vehicle manufacturers Zapp Electric Vehicles and The Little Car Company. The development now called 'The Command Works' represents the first new buildings to be constructed at the former RAF base in c.80 years. Sir Lewis Hamilton officially opened Building 141, the headquarters of Motorsport UK, in July 2021. The Sky Wave Distillery, is based on the site in converted tanker sheds.

In August 2025, Bicester Motion completed its latest £26.8m phase of development named Phase 1 of The Ranges, positioned on the former area of the RAF's rifle range. The new 90,000 sq ft building will become a new headquarters for YASA, which is a wholly-owned subsidiary of Mercedes Benz and a spin-out from the University of Oxford. It currently employs more than 400 people across several sites in Oxfordshire, and includes teams in innovation, engineering, prototyping, operations, and business support functions.

In February 2026, Bicester Motion received planning permission to restore the former RAF Station Offices, a prominent building at the entrance to the site.

=== Future Flight ===
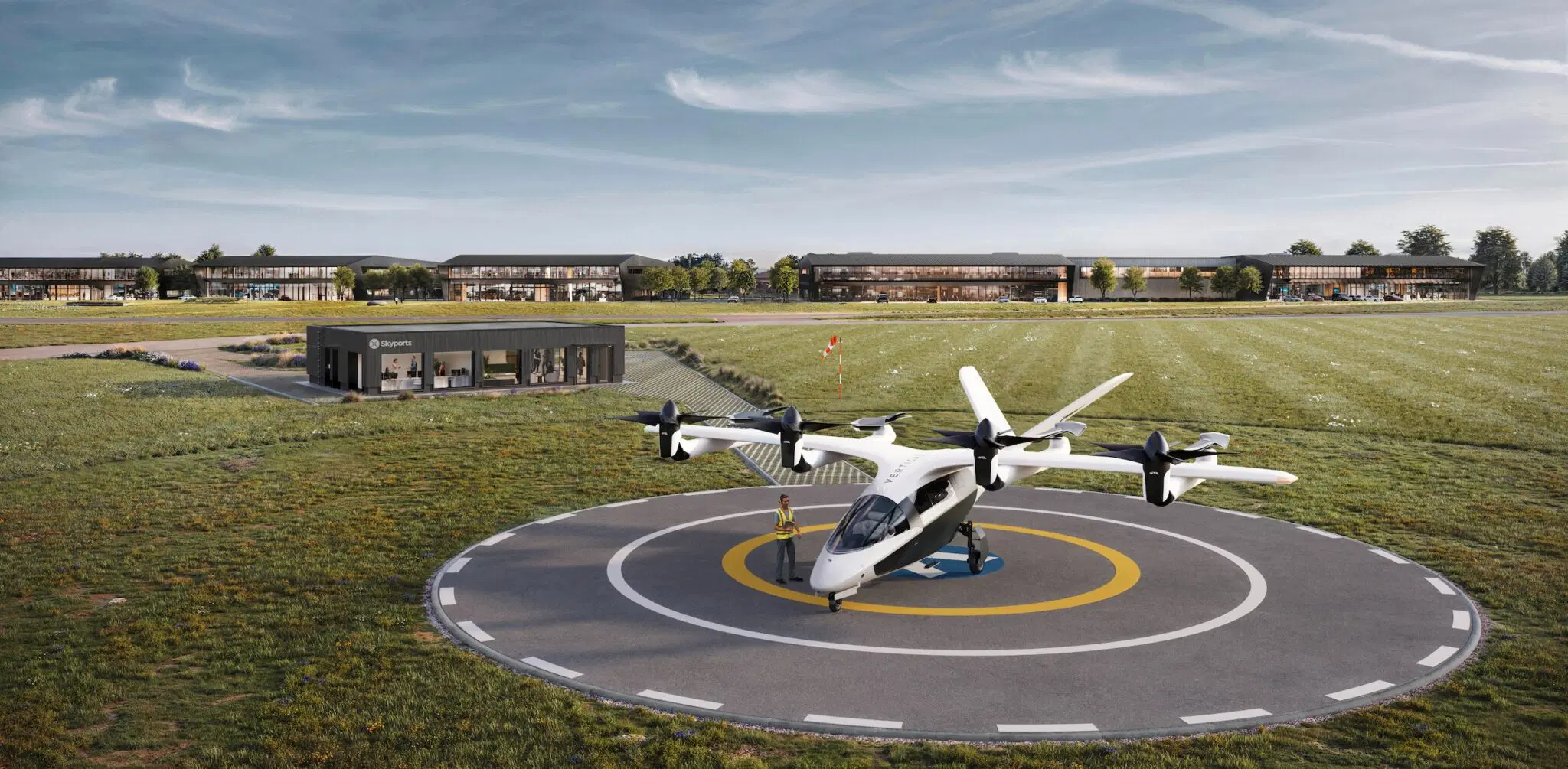
A CGI of the FATO landing pad at Skyports Vertiport, Bicester Motion

The airfield is now operated by Bicester Motion Ltd. group as an unlicensed airfield. It regularly receives visiting fixed wing aircraft and helicopters. In March 2025, Skyports Infrastructure announced the completion of the UK's first 'Vertiport' at Bicester Motion for electric passenger drone technology. The Vertiport is said to be a key output of the Advanced Mobility Ecosystem Consortium, a UK Research and Innovation Future Flight Challenge project, and is designed to serve as a testbed for electric vertical take-off and landing (eVTOL) operations, ground infrastructure, and air traffic management.

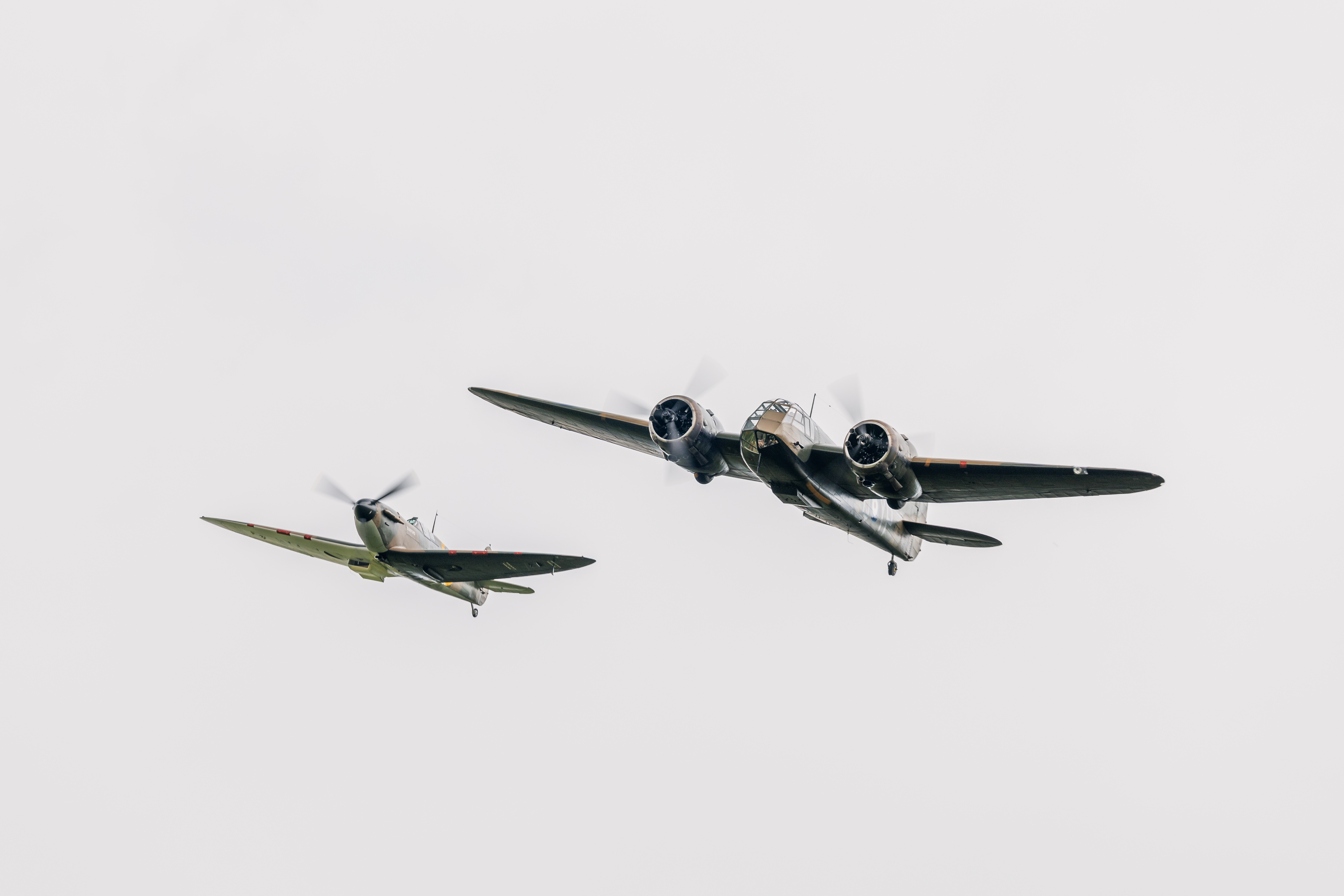
The Bristol Blenheim with MK 1 Spitfire at Flywheel, 2023

In 2023 the airfield was visited by the only flying Bristol Blenheim bomber for Flywheel, an event run by Bicester Heritage to celebrate their 10 year anniversary. Other period aircraft such as a MK1 Spitfire also visited for the event. Returning a Bristol Blenheim to the grass airfield of the former RAF Bicester was a remarkable nod to the location's WW2 history, as a representative of the Aircraft Restoration Company, who maintain the Blenheim at Duxford said:

"Taking to the skies in the Blenheim is always an honour, however, to be bringing the aircraft to Bicester Heritage, and landing it upon turf once trodden by so many young crews, is very special."

== Events ==
The site regularly hosts automotive events, whilst acting as a venue for larger shows including Build It Live. It hosted festival Vegan Camp Out in 2022 and 2023.

=== Scramble ===
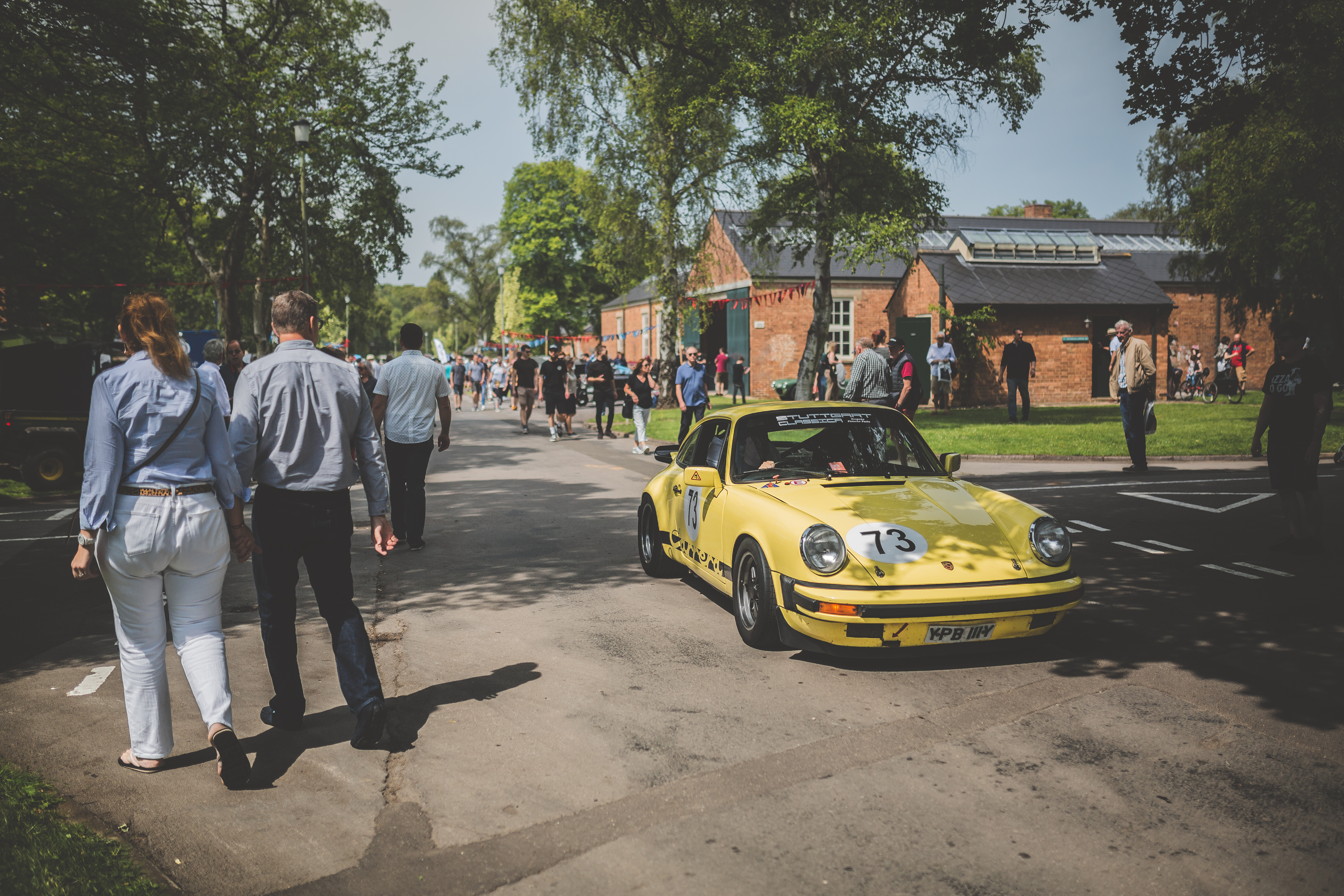
Visitors and vehicles at a Scramble event, within the former RAF Technical Site of Bicester

The Scramble is an open day event held at Bicester Motion, which largely takes place within the former RAF Bicester Technical Site. The event welcomes 6,500 - 8,000 visitors each day, usually three or four times a year. The specialist businesses based at Bicester Motion often open their workshops and showrooms as part of the event. A large number of automotive displays of all eras are usually found at these events, showing cars from veteran and vintage, through to classic and modern classic.

=== Flywheel ===
Flywheel was first launched at Bicester Motion in 2015 as an event to showcase automotive and aviation activity to visitors. The event ran on consecutive years until 2018 when it partnered with Haymarket's Classic & Sports Car Show, which moved to Bicester Motion from Alexandra Palace. In 2023 the event was relaunched by Bicester Motion to mark its 10th anniversary year. Aviation activity on the airfield included pre-WW2 aircraft, WW2 era military aircraft and later civilian aircraft.

== Charity ==
Registered charity StarterMotor was founded in 2016 to support Heritage Skills Academy, the historic automotive apprenticeship training college at Bicester Motion. It has established itself as the sector's only charity solely focused on introducing the next generation of automotive enthusiasts to historic motoring, careers and events. Academy and college support has now been extended to Silverstone and Brooklands, in addition to its headquarters at Bicester Motion, providing more learning cars for apprentices and other learning resources. StarterMotor currently supports 200 apprentices in learning.

In 2023, StarterMotor's CEO David Withers was given a High Sheriff Award for his contribution to supporting young people in the county by the High Sheriff of Oxfordshire, Mark Beard. The annual shrieval awards recognise individuals in Oxfordshire who have made outstanding contributions to the communities in which they live and work, in particular those who have made contributions to supporting young people.

== Accidents and incidents ==
- On 6 December 1941 Bristol Blenheim IV Z7962 of No. 110 Squadron RAF was taking off from the airfield but crashed just outside the perimeter, killing all four people aboard. Incorrect trim tab settings were thought to have caused the accident.
- At around 18:39 BST on Thursday 15 May 2025, a fire broke out at the Bicester Motion area of the site. The fire was initially fought by ten crews. The cause of the fire is currently unknown. Bicester Motion said in a statement that they are "working closely with the emergency services", and that the site was to be closed on 16 May, and over the weekend of 17–18 May, with a further statement to come out "as appropriate". Two firefighters – later named as Jennie Logan (born 1994 or 1995), a member of the Oxfordshire Fire and Rescue Service, and Martyn Sadler (born 1986 or 1987), also a member of the Oxfordshire Fire and Rescue Service as well as the London Fire Brigade – died tackling the fire, and a member of the public – later named as David Chester (born 1967 or 1968), a man from Bicester – also died. Two firefighters were also brought to hospital with serious injuries. The council have stated that the fire is now "under control", with four fire and rescue crews still remaining on site. A further statement was released by Bicester Motion on Friday 16 May at around 10:00am, which stated that they were "deeply saddened" by the news of the deaths of the firefighters, and the member of the public – whom they referred to as "a close friend of the site". Thames Valley Police stated that they "have commenced an unexplained death investigation". They said it is "currently not a criminal investigation" but that they would "follow the evidence as our enquiries continue".

== Sources ==
- Falconer, J (2012). RAF Airfields of World War 2. UK: Ian Allan Publishing. ISBN 978-1-85780-349-5.
- Sturtivant, R; Hamlin, J; Halley, J (1997). Royal Air Force flying training and support units. Air-Britain (Historians). ISBN 0-85130-252-1.
