= Royal Air Force Gliding & Soaring Association =

- Type: Charitable sporting and recreation organisation
- Founded: RAF Detling, 1949
- Headquarters: Headquarters (RAFGSA Centre) - RAF Halton, England and Scotland
- Number of locations: 8 locations
- Area served: All RAF personnel and Armed Forces personnel engaged in Adventurous Training in Gliding
- Services: Adventure Training and Flying training
- Revenue: 90,091 pound sterling (2021)
- Total assets: 60+ gliders, 8+ glider tugs and equipment to operate them.

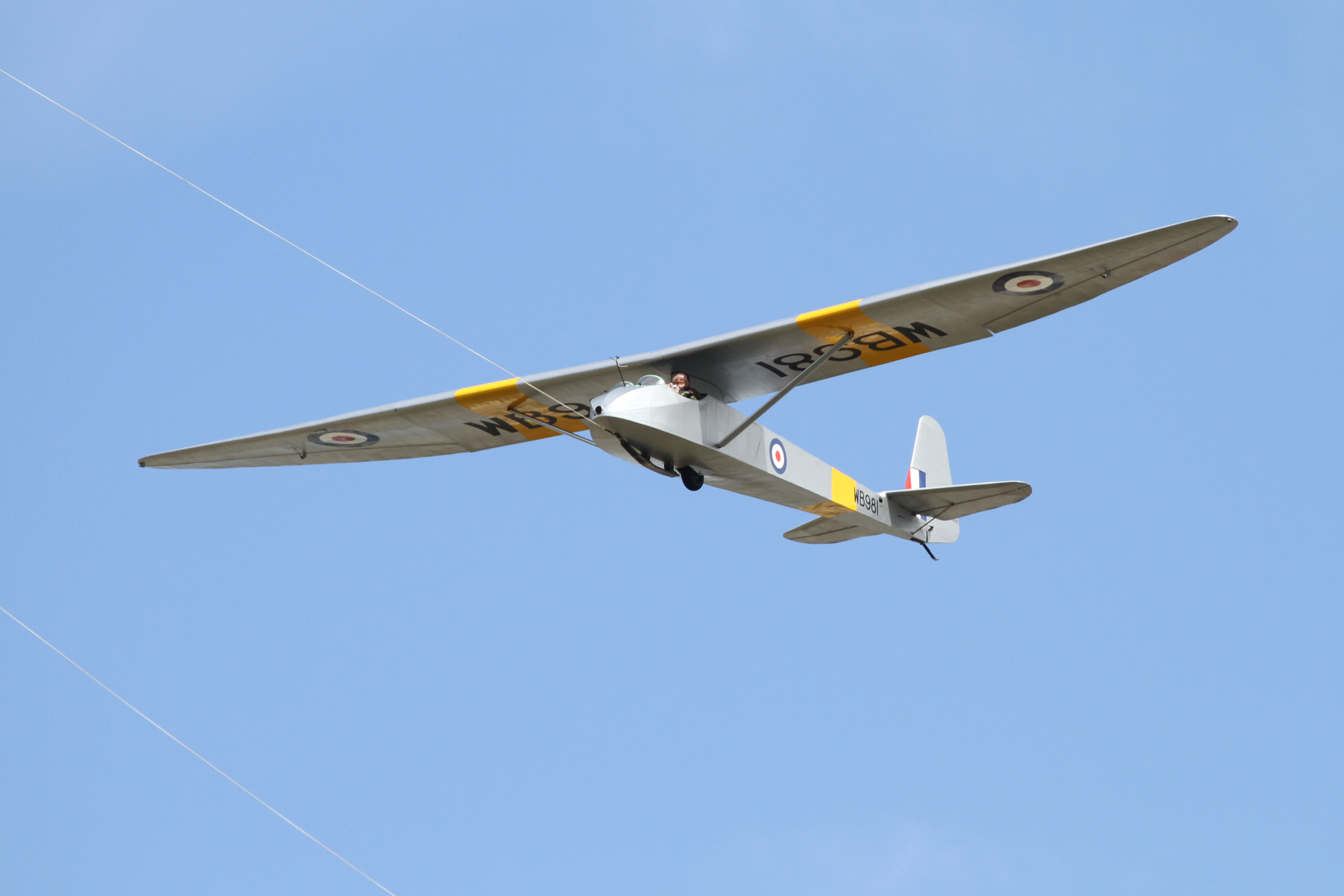
The Slingsby T.21 was one of the first two aircraft owned by the Royal Air Force Gliding & Soaring Association.

The Royal Air Force Gliding & Soaring Association (RAFGSA) is a voluntary organisation which exists to provide recreational flying to all RAF servicemen and women, in particular those employed in ground duties.

== RAFGSA Centre ==
The RAFGSA Centre is at RAF Halton. It has a full-time staff to provide central organisational, training and workshop facilities.

The Joint Services Gliding Centre (JSGC) is co-located at Halton. It is part of the Joint Service Adventurous Training (JSAT) Air Sports organisation which provides training courses for military personnel.

== History ==
In 1945, the British Air Forces of Occupation (BAFO) in Germany began using captured German gliders to provide recreational flying for RAF personnel.

This resulted in a demand for similar facilities in the United Kingdom, and the Royal Air Force Gliding & Soaring Association was founded in 1949. The first aircraft, a Slingsby T.21 and a Prefect, were bought in March 1950 and stationed at RAF Detling.

By 1952 27 gliders were being operated at seven clubs around the UK.

In October 1963 the RAFGSA Centre was established at RAF Bicester, absorbing the Windrushers Gliding Club which had been formed in January 1956 at RAF Little Rissington, later moving to Bicester.

In June 2004 the Centre moved to RAF Halton.

=== Andy Gough ===
Warrant Officer Arthur William Charles Gough BEM, (b. 2 June 1924), known as "Andy Gough", for some 20 years ran the RAF gliding centre at Bicester as its Chief Flying Instructor.

In 1975 in the RAFGSA Championships he flew from Aston Down Airfield, near Cirencester, across the English Channel to Holland, beating the previous distance record of 315 miles by a further 3 miles.

On 12 June 1982 he was giving an aerobatic display in a LET L-13 Blaník glider at RAF Brize Norton, but under high-G a wing came off and Andy was killed. He was then 58 years old.

The 'Andy Gough Memorial Trophy' is awarded annually to an outstanding RAFGSA member. WO Gough is also included on the armed forces memorial and armed forces roll of honour.

==== Other notable Bicester glider pilots ====
Jock Wishart, Ron Newall, Ian Strachan, Con Greaves, & Paddy Kearon were gliding instructors and competition pilots representing the RAFGSA in UK National Championships and some also the British Gliding Association (BGA) in International events.

=== Dick Stratton ===
Richard B Stratton (1923 - 2007) FRAeS was a skilled aircraft engineer and a licensed CAA inspector.

He joined the RAF with a wartime commission and served as a flight engineer on Short Sunderland flying boats until 1949 when he joined Saunders Roe as a flight engineer for flight tests of the Saunders Roe Princess large flying boat. Later he was involved in the development of the Saunders-Roe SR.53 rocket plane.

He was skilled in aviation engineering and was an innovative influence in light aircraft and gliding practices These included safe aerotowing, winching and scroll-gear machining and elastic rope bungee launching.

He also successfully converted military de Havilland Canada DHC-1 Chipmunks to the civil register for aerotowing gliders, which were used by the RAFGSA and other gliding organisations from the late 1960s.

==== Chipmunk Military to Civil conversion ====
The Chipmunk conversion from military to civil certification was unusual because military chipmunks had Coffman cartridge starters which required the services of a qualified armourer and a licensed pyrotechnic store to keep the cartridges safely.

Dick Stratton's innovation was to disconnect the cartridge linkage, but not the assembly, as it would have altered the balance of the aircraft.

Without "cartridge start" the propeller would have to be swung manually to start the engine, and the CAA was initially reluctant to certify the modification, until Dick pointed out that "swinging the prop" was normal procedure with many other types of light aircraft.

Other modifications included a plywood seat panel over what had been space for a parachute (not essential for aero towing). Another addition was an dymotape embossed plastic label inscribed IAS VNE 120KT (Indicated Airspeed "Never Exceed" is 120 knots) (222Km/h), which was a lower speed than RAF Chipmunks that were also qualified to carry out aerobatics, not needed in an Aero-tow aircraft.

Dick later converted some Chipmunks to accept Lycoming engines.

He also enabled MOGAS (MOtive GASoline) to be used in some cases where the AVGAS (AViation GASoline) had originally been specified, which reduced fuel costs.

Into the 1980s, He continued to instruct and carry out aerotows.

== Clubs ==
As well as the RAFGSA Centre at RAF Halton, currently there are six regional clubs run on a voluntary basis and based at or near RAF stations. Each offers initial training for novices as well as cross-country flying for more advanced pilots.

- RAFGSA Chilterns Gliding Centre, RAF Halton
  - Bannerdown Gliding Club, Keevil
  - Cranwell Gliding Club, RAF Cranwell
  - Fenland Gliding Club, RAF Marham
  - Fulmar Gliding Club, Easterton
  - Kestrel Gliding Club, RAF Odiham
  - RAF Shawbury Gliding Club, RAF Shawbury

== Aircraft ==
Approximately 60 gliders are in use, including the following types:

- Grob G102 Astir
- Grob G 109B
- Rolladen-Schneider LS8-18
- Scheibe SF25 Falke
- Schempp-Hirth Discus
- Schempp-Hirth Discus-2cT
- Schempp-Hirth Duo Discus
- Schempp-Hirth Janus CT
- Schempp-Hirth Ventus-2cT
- Schleicher K 8B
- Schleicher ASK 13
- Schleicher ASK 18
- Schleicher ASK 21
- Slingsby T61 Falke

Six Chipmunk and two Pawnee tugs were also in use.

== See also ==
- Gliding competitions
- Air Training Corps
