= Joan Meakin =

- Born: Joan Meakin Price
- Known for: First female to cross the English Channel in a glider

Joan Meakin (7 January 1910 – 11 November 1977 born Marjorie Joan) became the first female glider pilot to fly over the English Channel on 5 April 1934. She was also the only female flyer in Sir Alan Cobham's Flying Circus.

She married Ronald Price who was the assistant general manager to the circus.
