= Gransden Lodge Airfield =

Airfield in Cambridgeshire, England

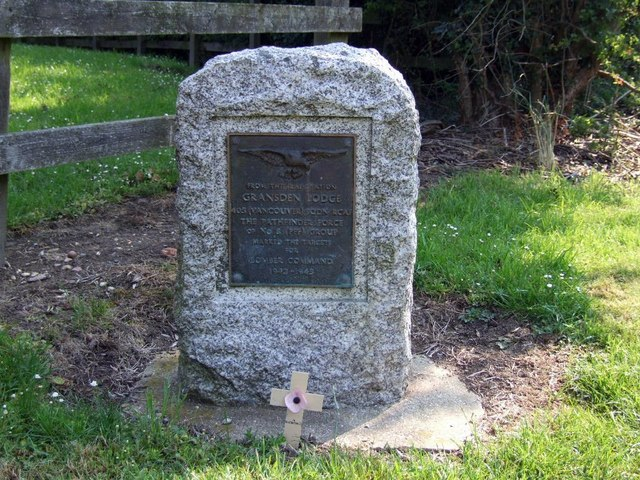
- Memorial
- IATA: none; ICAO: none

Summary
- Airport type: Private
- Operator: Private
- Location: Great Gransden, Cambridgeshire, England
- Built: 1941
- Elevation AMSL: 230 ft (70 m)
- Coordinates: 52°10′54″N 000°06′49″W

Map
- Location in Cambridgeshire

Gransden Lodge Airfield is a former wartime airfield located 10 miles (16 km) west of Cambridge, Cambridgeshire, England.

The Cambridge University Gliding Club (now Cambridge Gliding Centre) moved to Gransden Lodge in October 1991, having previously shared Duxford Airfield with the Imperial War Museum Duxford.

== History ==
Gransden Lodge opened in April 1942 as an operational RAF Bomber Command station called RAF Gransden Lodge with three concrete runways. At the end of 1945 the airfield was transferred to Transport Command but the last operational squadron was disbanded in February 1946. It was used for some motor races, including the first major postwar motor race in the UK on 15 June 1946.

The RAF station closed in 1955.

=== Operational units ===
Squadron	Aircraft	Variants	From	To	To	Notes
No. 53 Squadron	Consolidated Liberator	VI/VIII	1 December 1945	28 February 1946	Disbanded	
No. 97 (Straits Settlements) Squadron	Avro Lancaster	I/III	18 April 1943	18 April 1944	RAF Coningsby	Detachment from RAF Bourn.
No. 142 Squadron	de Havilland Mosquito	XXV	25 October 1944	28 September 1945	Disbanded	Reformed here.
No. 169 Squadron	North American Mustang	I	5 March 1943	10 March 1943	RAF Bottisham	
No. 192 Squadron	Vickers Wellington de Havilland Mosquito; Handley Page Halifax	IC, III, X IV; II	4 January 1943	5 April 1943	RAF Feltwell	
No. 405 Squadron RCAF	Handley Page Halifax; Avro Lancaster	II; I, III	19 April 1943	26 May 1945	RAF Linton-on-Ouse	
No. 421 Squadron	Supermarine Spitfire	VB	5 March 1943	10 March 1943	RAF Fowlmere	
No. 692 (Fellowship of the Bellows) Squadron	de Havilland Mosquito	XVI	4 June 1945	20 September 1945	Disbanded	

=== Units ===
The following units were also here at some point:

- No. 1418 Flight RAF
- No. 1474 (Special Duties) Flight RAF
- No. 1507 (Beam Approach Training) Flight RAF
- No. 1696 (Bomber) Defence Training Flight RAF
- Pathfinder Navigation Training Unit RAF

== Current use ==
The Cambridge Gliding Centre now uses the airfield.
