= Klaus Mietusch =

German fighter ace and Knight's Cross recipient

- Klaus Mitusz
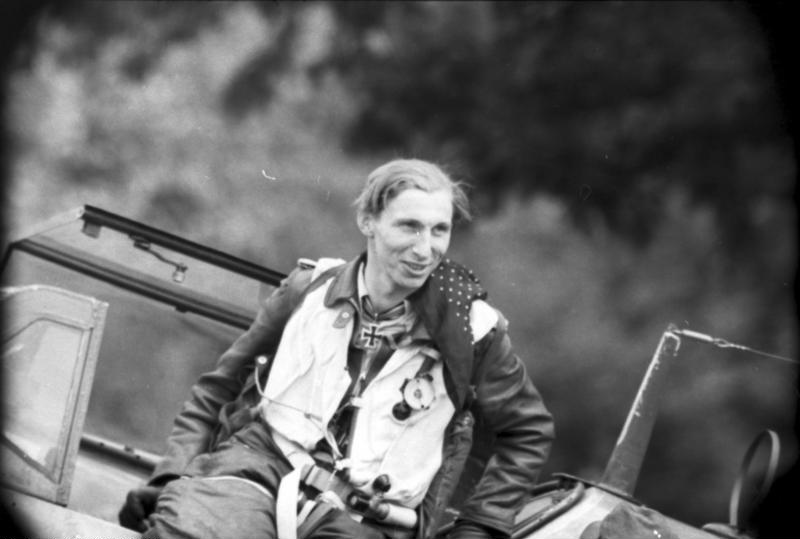
- Born: 5 August 1918; Posen, Province of Posen, Kingdom of Prussia (now Poznań, Poland)
- Died: 17 September 1944 (aged 26); Aldekerk, German-occupied Netherlands (now Kerken, Netherlands)
- Cause of death: Killed in action
- Burial place: Düsseldorf Northern Cemetery
- Military career
- Allegiance: Nazi Germany
- Branch: Luftwaffe
- Service years: 1937–1944
- Rank: Major (major)
- Unit: JG 26
- Commands: 7./JG 26, III./JG 26
- Conflicts: See battles World War II: Eastern Front; Western Front; Battle of France; Siege of Malta; Invasion of Yugoslavia; North African Campaign; Dieppe Raid; Defense of the Reich; Battle of Normandy; Operation Market Garden †
- Awards: Knight's Cross of the Iron Cross with Oak Leaves

Klaus Mietusch (5 August 1918 – 17 September 1944) was a German Luftwaffe military aviator and fighter ace during World War II. He is credited with 72 aerial victories achieved in 452 combat missions. This figure includes 15 aerial victories on the Eastern Front, and further 57 victories over the Western Allies, including 13 four-engined bombers.

Born in Posen, Mietusch grew up in the Weimar Republic and Nazi Germany. He joined the military service in the Luftwaffe in 1937. Following flight training, he was posted to Jagdgeschwader 26 "Schlageter" (JG 26—26th Fighter Wing) in 1939. Flying with this wing, Mietusch claimed his first aerial victory on 31 May 1940 on the Western Front during the Battle of France. In early 1941, he fought in the Mediterranean theater. He was made Staffelkapitän (squadron leader) of 7. Staffel (7th squadron) of JG 26 in September 1941 and in January 1943, was posted to the Eastern Front. In July 1943 he was appointed Gruppenkommandeur (group commander) of III. Gruppe of JG 26. Following his 60th aerial victory, he was awarded the Knight's Cross of the Iron Cross on 26 March 1944. Mietusch claimed his last aerial victory on 17 September 1944 during the Operation Market Garden. He was killed in action that day, shot down by a North American P-51 Mustang fighter from the 361st Fighter Group. Posthumously, Mietusch was awarded the Knight's Cross of the Iron Cross with Oak Leaves on 18 November 1944.

== Early life and career ==
Mietusch was born on 5 August 1918 in Posen in the Province of Posen, part of the Kingdom of Prussia, present-day Poznań in west-central Poland. At birth, his last-name was Mitusz which was later changed to Mietusch to sound more German. Following graduation from school with his Abitur (university-preparatory high school diploma), Mietusch joined the military service in the Luftwaffe in 1937, as a Fahnenjunker (officer cadet).

Jagdgeschwader 26 "Schlageter" (JG 26—26th Fighter Wing) was created on 1 May 1939 in Düsseldorf by renaming Jagdgeschwader 132 (JG 132—132nd Fighter Wing) and was commanded by Oberst Eduard Ritter von Schleich, a flying ace of World War I. Mietusch, who was promoted to Leutnant (second lieutenant) in 1939, was among the first pilots assigned to this unit following his training as a fighter pilot. (Note: Flight training in the Luftwaffe progressed through the levels A1, A2 and B1, B2, referred to as A/B flight training. A training included theoretical and practical training in aerobatics, navigation, long-distance flights and dead-stick landings. The B courses included high-altitude flights, instrument flights, night landings and training to handle the aircraft in difficult situations.)

== World War II ==
World War II in Europe began on Friday 1 September 1939 when German forces invaded Poland. Mietusch, who was serving as a technical officer with the Geschwaderstab (headquarters unit), was replaced in this capacity by Leutnant Walter Horten on 14 December. Serving with 7. Staffel (7th squadron) of JG 26, he crashed his Messerschmitt Bf 109 E-3 (Werknummer 1202—factory number) during takeoff at Chièvres Airfield on 27 May. At the time 7. Staffel was headed by Oberleutnant Georg Beyer. III. Gruppe (3rd group), to which his squadron was subordinated, was commanded by Major Ernst Freiherr von Berg who was replaced by Hauptmann Adolf Galland on 11 June.

Mietusch claimed his first aerial victory during the Battle of France on 31 May 1940. In combat with the fighters from No. 213 and No. 264 Squadron from the Royal Air Force (RAF), he shot down a Hawker Hurricane fighter near Dunkirk. On 8 June, Mietusch made a forced landing in his Bf 109 E-1 (Werknummer 2746) behind enemy lines. He was shot down in combat with a Hurricane near Neufchâtel. Although uninjured in the landing, he was shot by a French civilian and taken prisoner of war. Following the armistice of 22 June 1940, he was sent to hospital in Germany.

=== Malta, Balkans and North Africa in 1941 ===
On 22 January 1941, 7. Staffel received orders to relocate to Sicily in support of X. Fliegerkorps, under the command of General der Flieger (General of the Flyers) Hans Geisler, for actions against the strategically important island of Malta. With the opening of a new front in North Africa in mid-1940, British air and sea forces based on the island could attack Axis ships transporting vital supplies and reinforcements from Europe to North Africa. To counter this threat the Luftwaffe and the Regia Aeronautica (Italian Royal Air Force) were tasked with bombing raids in an effort to neutralise the RAF defences and the ports. That day the unit and a 40-strong detachment of ground crews departed Wevelgem. Following a brief stopover in Rome, 7. Staffel arrived in Gela on Sicily on 9 February 1941. There, the unit received factory new Bf 109 E-7 aircraft.

7./JG 26 nicknamed "Red Hearts".

Mietusch claimed his first victory in the Siege of Malta on 26 February over a No. 261 Squadron Hurricane 10 km (6.2 mi) south of Malta. He became a fighter ace on 22 March, taking his total to five aerial victories. In combat north of Malta, Mietusch had shot down two No. 261 Squadron Hurricanes. On 5 April, 7. Staffel moved to Grottaglie airfield near Taranto in Apulia to support the Invasion of Yugoslavia by the Wehrmacht. On the first day of the campaign, Mietusch claimed a Yugoslav Hawker Fury, which in fact was an Avia BH-33, in combat northeast of Podgorica. On 8 April, 7. Staffel returned to Gela and resumed operations over Malta. On 13 April, Mietusch was credited with shooting down two Hurricanes from No. 261 Squadron, one of which was piloted by Flight Officer Ernest "Imshi" Mason who was wounded in the encounter.

On 18 June, 7. Staffel flew together with I. Gruppe of Jagdgeschwader 27 (JG 27—27th Fighter Wing) and intercepted Hurricane fighters belonging to No. 1 Squadron of the South African Air Force (SAAF) covering the British retreat after Operation Battleaxe. In this encounter, No. 1 Squadron lost three Hurricanes, two were claimed by JG 27 and a third was shot down by Mietusch in combat southeast of Sidi Omar. On 21 August, twelve Martin Maryland bombers from the SAAF No. 12 and No. 24 Squadron attacked the Luftwaffe airfields at Kambut. The bombers were escorted by RAF Hurricane fighters from No. 229 Squadron. Bf 109s from JG 27 and 7. Staffel of JG 26 intercepted the flight, some attacking the bombers while others engaged the escort fighters. Mietusch claimed the probable destruction of a Maryland bomber which was not confirmed. This was his last claim on the North African Theater. 7. Staffel was then withdrawn from North Africa and returned France. During its six-month tenure in the Mediterranean Theater, 7. Staffel claimed 52 aerial victories without losing a single pilot nor aircraft in combat.

7. Staffel was reunited with III. Gruppe of JG 26 at Ligescourt. The Gruppe had just been equipped with the Bf 109 F-4. Mietusch, who had been on vacation before rejoining his unit, flew his next combat mission on 16 September. On 18 September, the RAF flew "Circus" No. 99 targeting Rouen. Defending against this "Circus", Mietusch shot down a Royal Australian Air Force (RAAF) No. 452 Squadron Spitfire fighter.

=== Squadron leader ===
Mietusch was appointed Staffelkapitän (squadron leader) of 7. Staffel on 19 September 1941. He succeeded Hauptmann Joachim Müncheberg in this command position. Müncheberg had led the Staffel since 22 August 1940 and had been given command of II. Gruppe after its former commander, Hauptmann Walter Adolph was killed in action. On 20 September, 7. Staffel began conversion training to the then new Focke-Wulf Fw 190 fighter aircraft at their airfield in Ligescourt. Full transition from the Bf 109 F-4 to the Fw 190 was not completed until mid-November.

The RAF ordered "Circus" No. 102 to their targets at Béthune and Gosnay on 21 September. The "Circus", consisting of twelve Bristol Blenheim bombers and escorted by fourteen squadrons of Hurricanes and Spitfires, was intercepted by Luftwaffe fighters from Jagdgeschwader 2 (JG 2—2nd Fighter Wing) and JG 26. Mietusch was credited with the destruction of his 12th and 13th aerial victories that day. He shot down two Spitfire fighters from either the New Zealand No. 485 (NZ) Squadron or No. 602 Squadron. The first Spitfire was claimed at 16:23 near Berck-sur-Mer while the second Spitfire was shot down at 16:30 20 km (12 mi) northwest of the Baie de Somme. Following combat with a Spitfire near Boulogne-sur-Mer on 13 October, Mietusch made an emergency landing in his Bf 109 F-4 (Werknummer 7220) at Saint-Omer. Command of III. Gruppe was passed on from Hauptmann Gerhard Schöpfel to Hauptmann Josef Priller on 6 December. Two days later, Mietusch claimed a Spitfire fighter in combat near Berck-sur-Mer but lost his wingman, Leutnant Walter Thorn who was shot down and killed by two Spitfires from No. 603 Squadron south of Montreuil.

On 14 April 1942, Mietusch flew Fw 190 A-2 (Werknummer 5215) in combat. His aircraft sustained minor damage, resulting in an emergency landing at Wevelgem. At the time, Mietusch dated Lieselotte Hays, a Luftwaffenhelferin (female air force helper). During the Dieppe Raid on 19 August, Mietusch claimed two aerial victories in the vicinity of Dieppe. He shot down two Spitfires at 10:34 and 10:35 from either No. 19 Squadron or No. 121 (Eagle) Squadron. Mietusch claimed his first two aerial victories over the United States Army Air Forces (USAAF) on 9 October though neither claim was confirmed by the Luftwaffe. The VIII Bomber Command flew a mission to Lille, targeting the locomotive works and steel factory. That day, Mietusch attacked a Short Stirling bomber which in fact was a misidentified Boeing B-17 Flying Fortress bomber from the 301st Bombardment Group which made it back to England. He attacked another B-17 bomber from the 301st Bombardment Group which later made a forced landing in the English Channel. Credited with 23 aerial victories, Mietusch was presented the German Cross in Gold (Deutsches Kreuz in Gold) on 16 October 1942.

=== Eastern Front ===
In January 1943, the Luftwaffe planned to move JG 26 to the Eastern Front. The idea was to exchange JG 26 with Jagdgeschwader 54 (JG 54—54th Fighter Wing) which supported Army Group North. In order to keep up operations, the exchange was planned by rotating each Gruppe by Gruppe and every Staffel by Staffel. In this context, Mietusch's 7. Staffel was attached to I. Gruppe of JG 54 which was commanded by Hauptmann Hans Philipp and was based outside of Leningrad. On 17 February, 7. Staffel left Courtrai, heading east by train. Following a stop at Heiligenbeil, the unit was based at the airbase at Krasnogvardeysk, present day Gatschina, which is located approximately 40 kilometers (25 miles) southwest of Leningrad. At Heiligenbeil, 7. Staffel received 13 new Fw 190 A-4 and A-5 fighters. The combat area of I. Gruppe of JG 54 was predominantly over the front of 18th Army, on the left flank of Army Group North, and on the Volkhov River.

In early May, 7. Staffel moved to an airfield at Siverskaya. Mietusch claimed his first aerial victories on the Eastern Front on 21 May. The Staffel was scrambled at 05:25 and ordered to intercept a flight of Petlyakov Pe-2 bombers, escorted by Lavochkin-Gorbunov-Gudkov LaGG-3 fighters, on a mission to bomb a railway bridge at Narva. 7. Staffel claimed five aerial victories on this mission, two Pe-2 bombers and three LaGG-3 fighters shot down, including a Pe-2 and two LaGG-3s by Mietusch.

On 13 June on the Western Front, the Gruppenkommandeur (group commander) of III. Gruppe, Hauptmann Kurt Ruppert was killed in action. Command of the Gruppe was temporarily given to Hauptmann Rolf Hermichen. On 29 June, Geschwaderkommodore Priller informed Mietusch that he had been chosen as new commander of III. Gruppe. Mietusch passed command of 7. Staffel to Hauptmann Günther Kelch and returned to Germany.

=== Group commander and death ===
On 5 July, Mietusch arrived at Cuxhaven-Nordholz Airfield where III. Gruppe was based and took over command from Hermichen. In July, the Gruppe received the Bf 109 G-4 and G-6 variants and the pilots began familiarizing themselves with this aircraft type while flying in Defense of the Reich. On the night of 24/25 July, the RAF and USAAF launched Operation Gomorrah, the attack on Hamburg during the last week of July 1943. The RAF initiated the attack at night which created a firestorm in the city. The following day, the USAAF attacked Hamburg with 100 B-17 bombers, spreading the destruction. Further 118 B-17 bombers bombed Kiel that day. Defending against these attacks, Mietusch claimed his first aerial victory as Gruppenkommandeur when he shot down a B-17 10 km (6.2 mi) north of Hamburg. III. Gruppe transferred from Cuxhaven-Nordholz to Amsterdam-Schiphol Airfield on 13 August. The USAAF targeted the German aircraft industry on 17 August in the Schweinfurt–Regensburg mission. Mietusch led his Gruppe against the bombers and shot down two B-17 bombers, the first southeast of Schleiden in the Eifel hills, and the second south of Laacher See. On 8 September, III. Gruppe moved to an airfield at Lille-Vendeville in France. On 13 November, the Gruppe relocated to an airfield at Mönchengladbach. On 29 November, VIII Bomber Command attacked Bremen. III. Gruppe intercepted the bombers prior to their bomb run and Mietusch shot a B-17 from its combat box west of Oldenburg. This was referred to as a Herausschuss (separation shot) and denoted a severely damaged heavy bomber which was forced to separate from its combat box and was counted as an aerial victory.

Combat box of a 12-plane B-17 squadron. Three such boxes completed a 36-plane group box.: 1. Lead Element; 2. High Element; 3. Low Element; 4. Low Low Element

On 9 January 1944, III. Gruppe returned to France with Gruppenstab, 9. and 11. Staffel at Lille-Vendeville, and 10. and 12. Staffel at Denain. On 8 March, Mietusch claimed his 60th aerial victory. That day, the Eighth Air Force, formerly known as VIII Bomber Command, targeted the ball bearings works at Erkner near Berlin. Mietusch led his III. Gruppe in the attack which intercepted the bombers on their target approach between Steinhuder Meer and Braunschweig. Due to the defending escort fighters, Mietusch attacked the bombers from the rear with only a few of his Bf 109 fighters. He was credited with a Herausschuss of a B-17 bomber from the 381st Bombardment Group south of Braunschweig before coming under attack by P-47 fighter from the 352nd Fighter Group. His Bf 109 G-6 (Werknummer 162032) was hit at close range, forcing him to bail out. Although injured, he landed safely near Steinhuder Meer. His victor may have been Captain Virgil Meroney who claimed his eighth aerial victory that day. Mietusch, who was hospitalized for next weeks, was awarded the Knights Cross of the Iron Cross (Ritterkreuz des Eisernen Kreuzes) on 26 March for 60 aerial victories claimed. During his absence from the Gruppe, Hauptmann Hermann Staiger temporarily replaced him as commander of III. Gruppe.

On 1 April, he was promoted to Major (major). On 12 April, Mietusch was injured in a landing accident and was again hospitalized, this time for three weeks. His Bf 109 G-6 (Werknummer 162345) ran into a bomb crater during landing at the Étain-Rouvres Airfield. On 12 May, the USAAF flew a mission against the German fuel industry, 886 bombers, escorted by 735 fighters, attacked six oil refineries. Mietusch intercepted the bombers on their return to England and claimed a Herausschuss of a B-17 bomber from the 452d Bombardment Group near Bastogne.

After the Allies launched Operation Overlord, the invasion of Normandy on 6 June, Luftflotte Reich sent additional units to the invasion front. By 8 June, Jagdgeschwader 1, Jagdgeschwader 3, Jagdgeschwader 11 and III. Gruppe of JG 54 had arrived in France and were subordinated to Fliegerkorps II. III. Gruppe of JG 26 was based at Villacoublay Airfield and flew missions to Le Havre that day. In the early morning hours, Mietusch claimed the destruction of two Republic P-47 Thunderbolt fighters from the USAAF 371st Fighter Group. The P-47s had been attacking ground targets east of Le Havre. On 17 July, Mietusch shot down a No. 602 Squadron Spitfire southwest of Caen. Shortly after, he ignored the warning of his wingman Unteroffizier Heinz Gehrke and was shot down in his Bf 109 G-6/U4 (Werknummer 440640) near Argentan-Alençon by another Spitfire from the Royal Canadian Air Force (RCAF) No. 411 Squadron. Mietusch bailed out and was wounded, returning to his unit the next day.

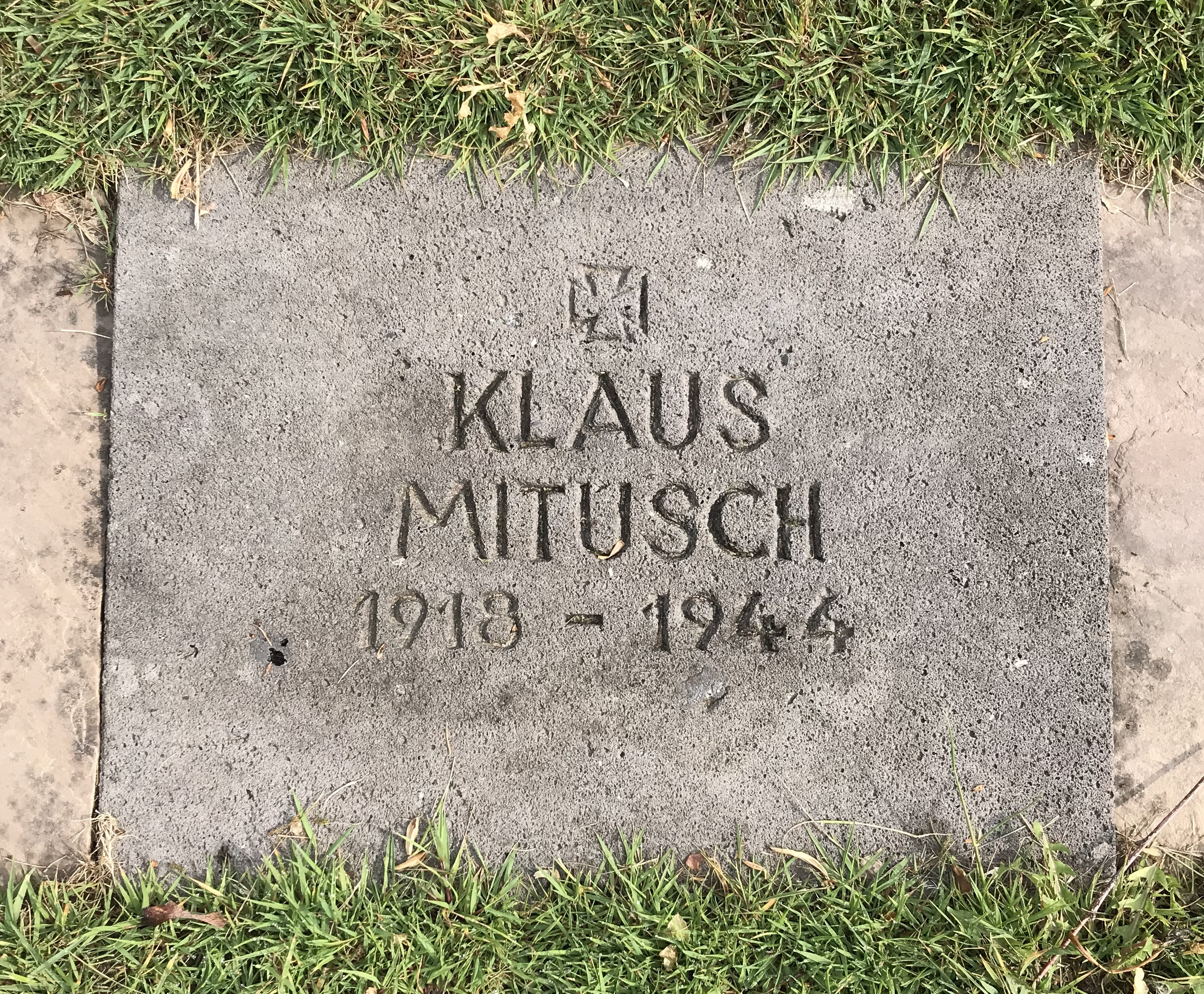
Grave in Düsseldorf

Mietusch was killed in action on 17 September 1944 during the first day of Operation Market Garden, the operation to secure a bridgehead over the River Rhine. In an attempt to defend against Allied airborne landings in the Netherlands, Mietusch led a flight of 15 Bf 109s to the Allied landing zones. Near the German border to the Netherlands, Mietusch flight intercepted a squadron of North American P-51 Mustang fighters. In the resulting aerial combat, Mietusch shot down one of the P-51 fighters north of Mönchengladbach before he came under attack by another P-51, piloted by Lieutenant William Beyer from the 376th Fighter Squadron, assigned to the 361st Fighter Group. Mietusch was shot down in his Bf 109 G-6/U4 (Werknummer 441646) by Beyer, crashing at 15:11 near Aldekerk.

Posthumously, Mietusch was awarded the Knight's Cross of the Iron Cross with Oak Leaves (Ritterkreuz des Eisernen Kreuzes mit Eichenlaub) on 18 November 1944. He was the 653rd member of the German armed forces to be so honored. Mietusch was buried in the honor section of the Düsseldorf Northern Cemetery (Field 112-Section 0-Grave 117). Caldwell characterized Mietusch as a very nervous man with limited social skills. According to Caldwell's account, Mietusch never interacted with non-commissioned officers, overcoming his lack of self-confidence by an act of will. Command of III. Gruppe was temporarily passed on to Hauptmann Paul Schauder before Hauptmann Walter Krupinski officially succeeded Mietusch on 27 September.

== Summary of career ==
=== Aerial victory claims ===
According to US historian David T. Zabecki, Mietusch was credited with 72 aerial victories. The authors Heaton, Lewis, Olds and Schulze list him with 76 aerial victories. Mathews and Foreman, authors of Luftwaffe Aces — Biographies and Victory Claims, researched the German Federal Archives and found records for 72 aerial victory claims, plus six further unconfirmed claims. This figure includes 15 aerial victories on the Eastern Front and 57 over the Western Allies, including 13 four-engined bombers.

Victory claims were logged to a map-reference (PQ = Planquadrat), for example "PQ 26 Ost 80364". The Luftwaffe grid map (Jägermeldenetz) covered all of Europe, western Russia and North Africa and was composed of rectangles measuring 15 minutes of latitude by 30 minutes of longitude, an area of about 360 square miles (930 km^{2}). These sectors were then subdivided into 36 smaller units to give a location area 3 km × 4 km (1.9 mi × 2.5 mi) in size.

Chronicle of aerial victories
This and the – (dash) indicates unwitnessed aerial victory claims for which Mietusch did not receive credit. This along with the * (asterisk) indicates an Herausschuss (separation shot)—a severely damaged heavy bomber forced to separate from his combat box which was counted as an aerial victory. This and the ? (question mark) indicates information discrepancies listed by Caldwell, Prien, Stemmer, Rodeike, Balke, Bock, Mathews and Foreman.
Claim	Date	Time	Type	Location	Claim	Date	Time	Type	Location
– 7. Staffel of Jagdgeschwader 26 – Battle of France — 10 May – 25 June 1940
1	31 May 1940	15:40	Hurricane	Dunkirk					
– 7. Staffel of Jagdgeschwader 26 "Schlageter" – At the Channel and over England — 26 June 1940 – 20 August 1941
2	31 August 1940	10:10? (Note: According to Caldwell claimed at 09:55.)	Spitfire	Chelmsford					
– 7. Staffel of Jagdgeschwader 26 "Schlageter" – Sicily, Balkans and North Africa — February – September 1941
3	26 February 1941	14:17	Hurricane	10 km (6.2 mi) south of Malta	8	13 April 1941	10:34	Hurricane	4 km (2.5 mi) northeast of Kalafrana
4	22 March 1941	16:24	Hurricane	40 km (25 mi) north of Malta	9	13 May 1941	14:00	Hurricane	2 km (1.2 mi) southwest of Ta' Vnezja
5	22 March 1941	16:26? (Note: According to Mathews and Foreman claimed at 16:26.)	Hurricane	40 km (25 mi) north of Malta	10	17 June 1941	10:30	Hurricane	southeast of Sidi Omar
6	6 April 1941	12:10	Fury	northeast of Podgorica	—	17 June 1941	—	Hurricane	southeast of Sidi Omar
7	11 April 1941	11:50	Hurricane	20 km (12 mi) north of Malta	—	21 August 1941	—	Maryland 167	Kambut
– 7. Staffel of Jagdgeschwader 26 "Schlageter" – On the Western Front — September – 31 December 1941
11	18 September 1941	16:15	Spitfire	southeast of Le Paradis	13	21 September 1941	16:30	Spitfire	20 km (12 mi) northwest of the Baie de Somme
12	21 September 1941	16:23	Spitfire	Berck-sur-Mer	14	8 December 1941	12:55	Spitfire	Berck-sur-Mer
– 7. Staffel of Jagdgeschwader 26 "Schlageter" – On the Western Front — 1 January – 31 December 1942
15	12 April 1942	13:34	Spitfire	southeast of Saint-Omer east of Arques	20	19 August 1942	10:35? (Note: According to Mathews and Foreman claimed at 10:15.)	Spitfire	10 km (6.2 mi) northwest of Dieppe
16	12 April 1942	13:51? (Note: According to Caldwell claimed at 13:49.)	Spitfire	15 km (9.3 mi) north-northwest of Dunkirk	21	27 August 1942	15:10	Spitfire	15 km (9.3 mi) southwest of Calais
—	30 April 1942	19:30	Spitfire	3 km (1.9 mi) off of the Baie de Somme	22	27 August 1942	15:16	Spitfire	20 km (12 mi) west-northwest of Cap Gris-Nez
17	3 May 1942	16:05	Spitfire	Calais	23	22 September 1942	13:15	Boston	3 km (1.9 mi) east of Ostend
18	5 May 1942	15:35? (Note: According to Mathews and Foreman claimed at 15:40.)	Spitfire	3 km (1.9 mi) northwest of Poperinge	—	9 October 1942	10:35	Stirling*	Lille
19	19 August 1942	10:34	Spitfire	3 km (1.9 mi) northeast of Dieppe	—	9 October 1942	10:45	B-17	northeast of Lille
– 7. Staffel of Jagdgeschwader 26 "Schlageter" – On the Western Front — 1 January – 17 February 1943
—	13 January 1943	14:35	B-17	Lille; 2–5 km (1.2–3.1 mi) south of Margate	25	20 January 1943	13:12	Spitfire	Ardres
24	20 January 1943	12:42	Spitfire	4–5 km (2.5–3.1 mi) south of Margate	26	22 January 1943	15:15	Spitfire	10–15 km (6.2–9.3 mi) north of Gravelines
– 7. Staffel of Jagdgeschwader 26 "Schlageter" – Eastern Front — 17 February – 29 June 1943
27	21 May 1943	05:47? (Note: According to Caldwell claimed at 05:35.)	LaGG-3	PQ 26 Ost 80364, Lake Khabolovo; Koporski Bight, near Dolgovo	35	18 June 1943	06:13? (Note: According to Caldwell, Mathews and Foreman claimed at 06:12.)	LaGG-3	PQ 36 Ost 20752 forest in the vicinity of Kinderovo
28	21 May 1943	05:47? (Note: According to Mathews and Foreman claimed at 05:53.)	LaGG-3	PQ 26 Ost 80364, Lake Khabolovo northern area of Lake Khabolovo	36	18 June 1943	06:18? (Note: According to Caldwell claimed at 06:19 over a Lavochkin-Gorbunov-Gudkov LaGG-3.)	La-5?	PQ 36 Ost 20764, north of Podborovye
29	21 May 1943	05:55	Pe-2	PQ 26 Ost 80234, Cape Ustinskij	37	18 June 1943	17:15	LaGG-3	PQ 36 Ost 00264
30	21 May 1943	10:20	I-153? (Note: According to Mathews and Foreman claimed as a Curtiss P-40 Warhawk.)	PQ 26 Ost 70221, 4 km (2.5 mi) south of Lavansaari	38	18 June 1943	17:18	LaGG-3	PQ 36 Ost 00292
31	27 May 1943	13:32? (Note: According to Caldwell claimed at 13:31.)	LaGG-3	PQ 36 Ost 00264, northwest of Mga	39	18 June 1943	20:20	Yak-7	PQ 36 Ost 10131, Lake Ladoga
32	30 May 1943	19:55	LaGG-3	PQ 36 Ost 11782, Lake Ladoga	40	22 June 1943	15:30	LaGG-3	PQ 26 Ost 90134
33	31 May 1943	16:13? (Note: According to Caldwell claimed at 16:15.)	LaGG-3	PQ 36 Ost 00243, east of Leningrad	41	22 June 1943	15:31? (Note: According to Caldwell, Mathews and Foreman claimed at 15:33.)	LaGG-3	PQ 26 Ost 90164, 5 km (3.1 mi) northwest of Gorki
34	17 June 1943	05:13	LaGG-3	PQ 36 Ost 20133, northeast Wolchowstroj; 5 km (3.1 mi) northeast Wolchowstroj					
– III. Gruppe of Jagdgeschwader 26 "Schlageter" – On the Western Front and Defense of the Reich — 5 July 1943 – 17 September 1944
42	25 July 1943	17:02	B-17	10 km (6.2 mi) north of Hamburg	57	8 March 1944	13:25	B-17*	south of Zwolle-Braunschweig
43	17 August 1943	15:20	B-17	west of Schmidtheim southeast of Schleiden-Eifel	58	12 May 1944	15:42	B-17*	PQ 05 Ost QM/QL; Bastogne
44	17 August 1943	15:25	B-17	south of Laacher See	59	4 June 1944	20:15	Typhoon	northwest of Romilly
45	19 August 1943	19:23? (Note: According to Mathews and Foreman claimed at 19:17 as a Herausschuss.)	B-17?	northwest of Breda	60	8 June 1944	06:40	P-47	northeast of Le Havre
46	19 September 1943	12:46	Spitfire	vicinity of Poperinge	61	8 June 1944	06:45	P-47	PQ 05 Ost SA/SB east of Le Havre
— (Note: This unconfirmed claim is not listed by Mathews and Foreman.)	27 September 1943	12:46	Spitfire	10–15 km (6.2–9.3 mi) southwest of Poix (Note: There are several places called Poix, and it is unclear which this one was. However, it may be noted that there was an important Luftwaffe airfield at Poix-de-Picardie.)	62	14 June 1944	07:35	P-38	PQ 05 Ost UE-7/04 Ost N/AE-1 northwest of Paris
—	3 October 1943	18:25	Spitfire	northeast of Beauvais	63	14 June 1944	08:00	B-17	PQ 05 Ost UG/04 Ost N/AG east of Paris
47	20 October 1943	14:10	B-17	Cambrai	64	15 June 1944	07:00	B-24	PQ 04 Ost N/CB/DC southwest of Chartres
48	29 November 1943	14:30	B-17*	west of Oldenburg	65	23 June 1944	13:58? (Note: According to Mathews and Foreman claimed at 14:00.)	P-38	PQ 04 Ost N/CD/CE east of Chartres
49	30 November 1943	11:45? (Note: According to Mathews and Foreman claimed at 11:50.)	P-38	North Sea	66	23 June 1944	14:00	P-38	PQ 04 Ost N/CE southeast of Chartres
50	1 December 1943	11:45	P-38	Freilingen-Vorneburg	67	4 July 1944	14:50	P-38	PQ 04 Ost UB west of Évreux
51	20 December 1943	12:25	B-17	northwest of Wilhemshaven	68	17 July 1944	16:40	Spitfire	PQ 15 West UT-2/6 southwest of Caen
52	14 January 1944	11:50	Spitfire	northwest of Saint-Omer south of Saint-Omer	69	18 August 1944	14:06? (Note: According to Mathews and Foreman claimed at 14:07.)	P-47	PQ 05 Ost UD-7/8 northwest of Paris
53	14 January 1944	15:35	P-47	St Pol	70	26 August 1944	14:50? (Note: According to Mathews and Foreman claimed at 14:55.)	P-47	PQ 05 Ost TC-4; Rouen
54	25 February 1944	12:15	B-17	4 km (2.5 mi) southwest of Charleville	71	26 August 1944	15:00? (Note: According to Mathews and Foreman claimed at 15:05.)	P-47	PQ 05 Ost TB-6 west of Rouen
55	25 February 1944	15:00	B-17*	PQ 05 Ost UQ-3, east of Pirmasens	72	17 September 1944	14:55	P-51	PQ 05 Ost LN-1 north of München-Gladbach
56	6 March 1944	13:05	Typhoon	PQ 05 Ost QE-8/9, 5 km (3.1 mi) north of Amiens					

=== Awards ===
- Iron Cross (1939) 2nd and 1st Class
- Honor Goblet of the Luftwaffe (26 April 1941)
- German Cross in Gold on 15 October 1942 as Oberleutnant in the 7./Jagdgeschwader 26 "Schlageter" (Note: According to Caldwell on 15 October 1942.)
- Front Flying Clasp of the Luftwaffe for Fighter Pilots in Gold with Pennant "400" (10 July 1944)
- Knight's Cross of the Iron Cross with Oak Leaves
  - Knight's Cross on 26 March 1944 as Hauptmann and Gruppenkommandeur of the III./Jagdgeschwader 26 "Schlageter"
  - 653rd Oak Leaves on 18 November 1944 as Major and Gruppenkommandeur of the III./Jagdgeschwader 26 "Schlageter"
