= William R. Beyer =

American flying ace (1923-2016)

William Rockafeller Beyer
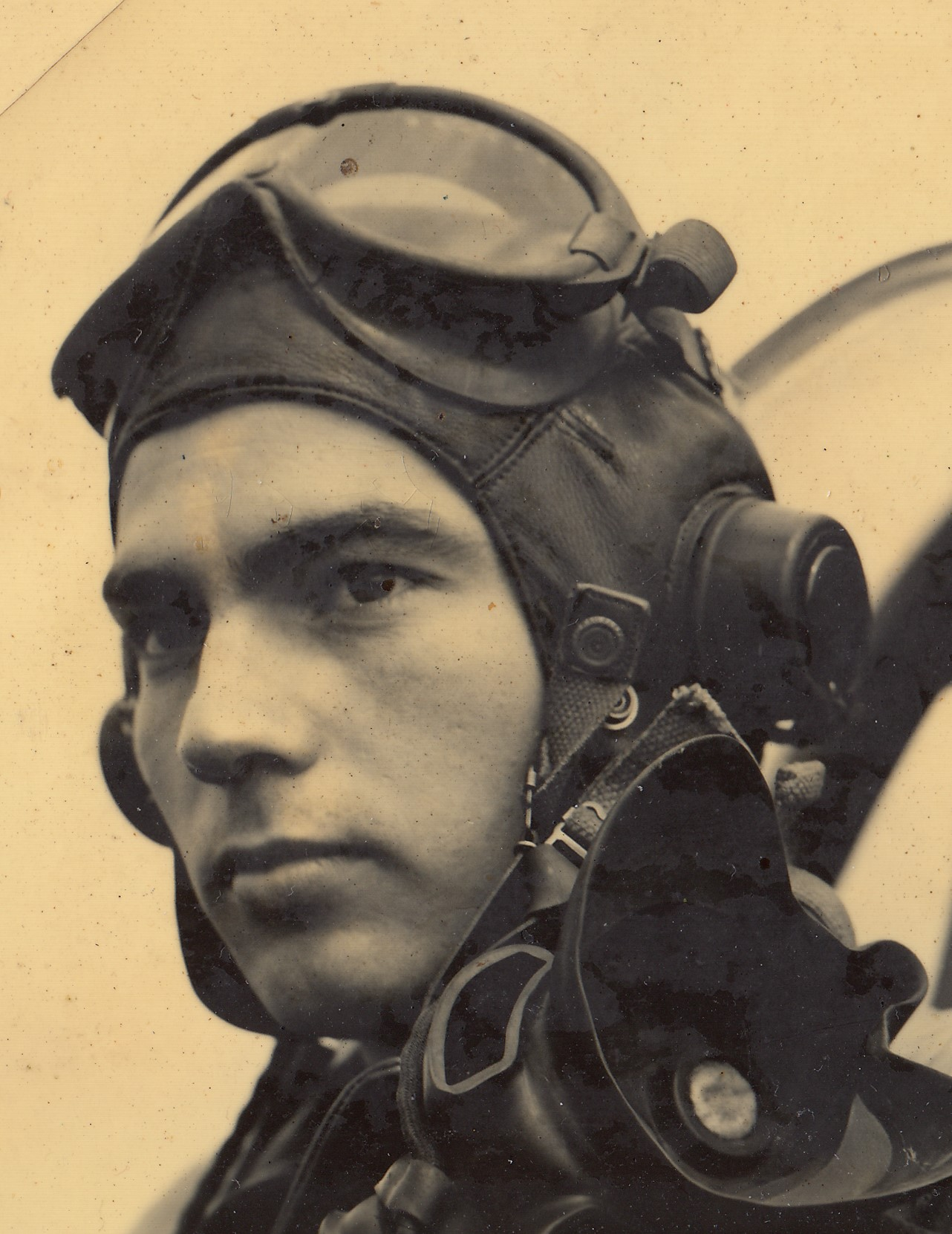
- Born: July 5, 1923; Danville, Pennsylvania, U.S.
- Died: August 15, 2016 (aged 93); Danville, Pennsylvania, U.S.
- Burial place: Odd Fellows Cemetery; Danville, Pennsylvania, U.S.
- Military career
- Allegiance: United States of America
- Branch: United States Army Air Forces
- Service years: 1942–1945
- Rank: Captain
- Nickname: Bill
- Unit: 376th Fighter Squadron, 361st Fighter Group
- Conflicts: World War II
- Awards: Silver Star; Distinguished Flying Cross; Air Medal (13)

William Rockafeller Beyer (July 5, 1923 - August 15, 2016) was an American flying ace during World War II, who was credited with 9 aerial victories.

== Early life ==
Beyer was born in 1923 in Danville, Pennsylvania, to Carl Beyer and Lorraine Rockafeller, née Manning. He resided in Danville for most of his life and graduated from Danville Area High School in 1941.

== Military career ==
On January 21, 1942, he enlisted in the U.S. Army Air Forces and attended glider training before entering the Aviation Cadet Program in January 1943. On November 3, 1943, he was commissioned a second lieutenant and was awarded his pilot wings at Napier Field in Alabama.

=== World War II ===
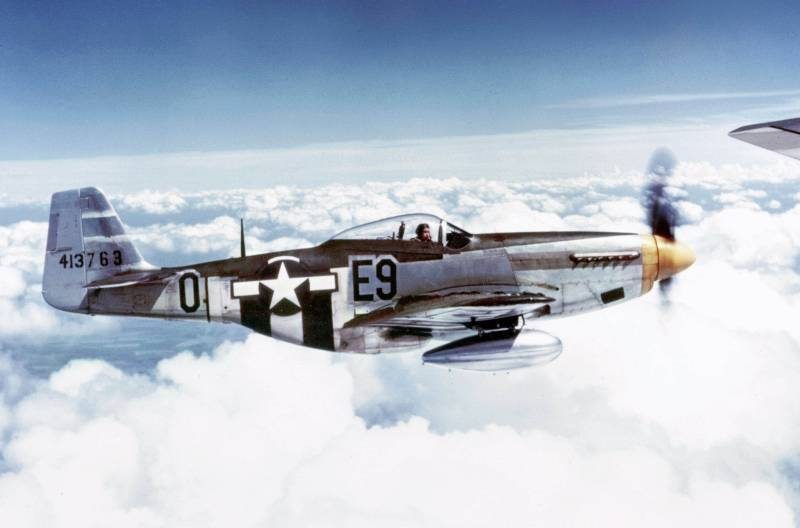
361st FG P-51 Mustang

In April 1944, Beyer was assigned to the 376th Fighter Squadron of the 361st Fighter Group at RAF Bottisham in Cambridgeshire, England. Initially flying the P-47 Thunderbolts, the 361st FG converted to P-51 Mustangs in May 1944.

Flying the P-51s, Beyer scored his first aerial victory on September 17, 1944, when he shot down a Bf 109. On September 27, while escorting bombers in the vicinity of Eisenach, his flight encountered a flight of Fw 190s attacking the bombers. In the aerial battle, Beyer managed to shoot down five Fw 190s, making him one of the 38 USAAF pilots to become an "ace in a day".

On September 17, 1944, during the first day of Operation Market Garden, Beyer's squadron was intercepted by a flight of 15 Bf 109s near the German border with the Netherlands. In the resulting aerial combat, one of the P-51s was shot down by a Bf 109 piloted by German flying ace Klaus Mietusch; Mietusch in turn was shot down by Beyer, killing him as his Bf 109 crashed near Aldekerk, and thus crediting Beyer with his seventh aerial victory.

On September 26, the 361st FG moved to RAF Little Walden in Essex, England. He scored his last aerial victories of the war on November 26, when he shot down a Bf 109 and Fw 190, south of Uelzen.

During the war, he was credited with a total of nine enemy aircraft destroyed in aerial combat.

He returned to the United States in May 1945, and left active duty in November 1945.

== Later life ==
On April 12, 1945, Beyer married Elizabeth Josephine Pope. They had two daughters and a son, along with numerous grand and great-grandchildren.

After leaving military service, Beyer moved back to Danville in 1951 and worked as an instrument mechanic at Merck & Co. for 33 years.

In 2015, he along with other flying aces received the Congressional Gold Medal, in recognition of "their heroic military service and defense of the country's freedom throughout the history of aviation warfare."

Beyer died on August 15, 2016, at the age of 93 and was buried at the Odd Fellows Cemetery in Danville.

== Aerial victory summary ==
Date	Location	Number	Type
September 17, 1944	between Hasselt, Belgium and Wesel, Germany	1	Bf 109
September 27, 1944	Eisenach, Germany	5	Fw 190
November 2, 1944	Aldekerk, Netherlands	1	Bf 109
November 26, 1944	Uelzen, Germany	1	Bf 109
November 26, 1944	Uelzen, Germany	1	Fw 190

All information on enemy aircraft damaged and destroyed is from Stars and Bars.

== Awards and decorations ==
USAAF Pilot Badge
Silver Star
Distinguished Flying Cross
Air Medal with two silver and two bronze oak leaf clusters
Army Good Conduct Medal
American Campaign Medal
European-African-Middle Eastern Campaign Medal with three bronze campaign stars
World War II Victory Medal

Army Presidential Unit Citation
