= Battle of Arques (1303) =

Battle in France

- Part of the Franco-Flemish War
Date	4 April 1303
Location	Arques, Pas-de-Calais, County of Flanders 50.7361°N 2.3033°E
Result	Flemish victory

Belligerents
County of Flanders	Kingdom of France

Commanders and leaders
William of Jülich	Jacques de Bayonne

Strength
10,000	1,600 heavy cavalry Unknown infantry

Casualties and losses
1,000 killed	300 killed

The Battle of Arques was fought on 4 April 1303 in the French city of Arques between the County of Flanders and the Kingdom of France.

== Background ==
The Battle of the Golden Spurs was an embarrassing defeat for King Philip IV of France that liberated the whole of the county from French occupation. Eager for revenge, King Philip raised a new army under Gaucher de Châtillon, Constable of France, and moved against Flanders. The Flemish under William of Jülich were checking the French troops and both armies met on 30 August 1302, between Arras and Douai. Negotiations were opened and both armies withdrew a few days later without fighting.

== Battle ==
In the spring of 1303 the French army moved against Saint-Omer. William of Jülich responded by an attack on the weakly defended city of Arques, killing the French garrison of 60 and burning down the city. De Châtillon hurried to Arques, where the Flemish prepared for battle. As in the Battle of the Golden Spurs, William of Jülich positioned his infantry, mainly from Ypres in a horseshoe shaped formation. For hours, the French tried to break the Flemish formation, but to no avail. Finally the French withdrew to Saint-Omer, leaving 300 dead behind. The Flemish had lost 1,000 killed and did not pursue. The battle was a Flemish victory, as they retained the field. A new French invasion of Flanders had been prevented.

=== Casualties ===
The Franciscan Friar of Ghent reported 1,000 Flemish killed, mostly non-combatants. The French Chronicler Guillaume Guiart put the French death toll at 300. These estimates are accepted by Verbruggen. The Flemish death toll varies in the French chronicles. The Chronique Normande gave 2,000 dead, Jean Desnouelles and the Récits d'un bourgeois de Valenciennes 12,000, Guillaume de Franchet 15,000, the Chronique Artésienne 16,000 and the Chronique des Pays-Bas 24,000.

== Bibliography ==
- De Maesschalck, Edward (2019). De Graven van Vlaanderen (861-1384) [The Counts of Flanders (861-1384)] (in Dutch) (2nd ed.). DavidsFonds / Standaard uitgeverij. ISBN 9789002268458.
- DeVries, Kelly (1996). Infantry Warfare in the Early Fourteenth Century: Discipline, Tactics, and Technology. Woodbridge: Boydell&Brewer. ISBN 0851155677.
- Verbruggen, J.F. (1997) [1954]. The Art of Warfare in Western Europe During the Middle Ages: From the Eighth Century to 1340 [De Krijgskunst in West-Europa in de Middeleeuwen, IXe tot begin XIVe eeuw]. Translated by Willard, S. (2nd ed.). Suffolk: Boydell Press. ISBN 0-85115-630-4.
- Verbruggen, J.F.; Falter, Rolf (2001). 1302 Opstand in Vlaanderen [1302 Revolt in Flanders] (in Dutch). Tielt: Lannoo. ISBN 9020944126.
