= Goudale =

Type of French beer

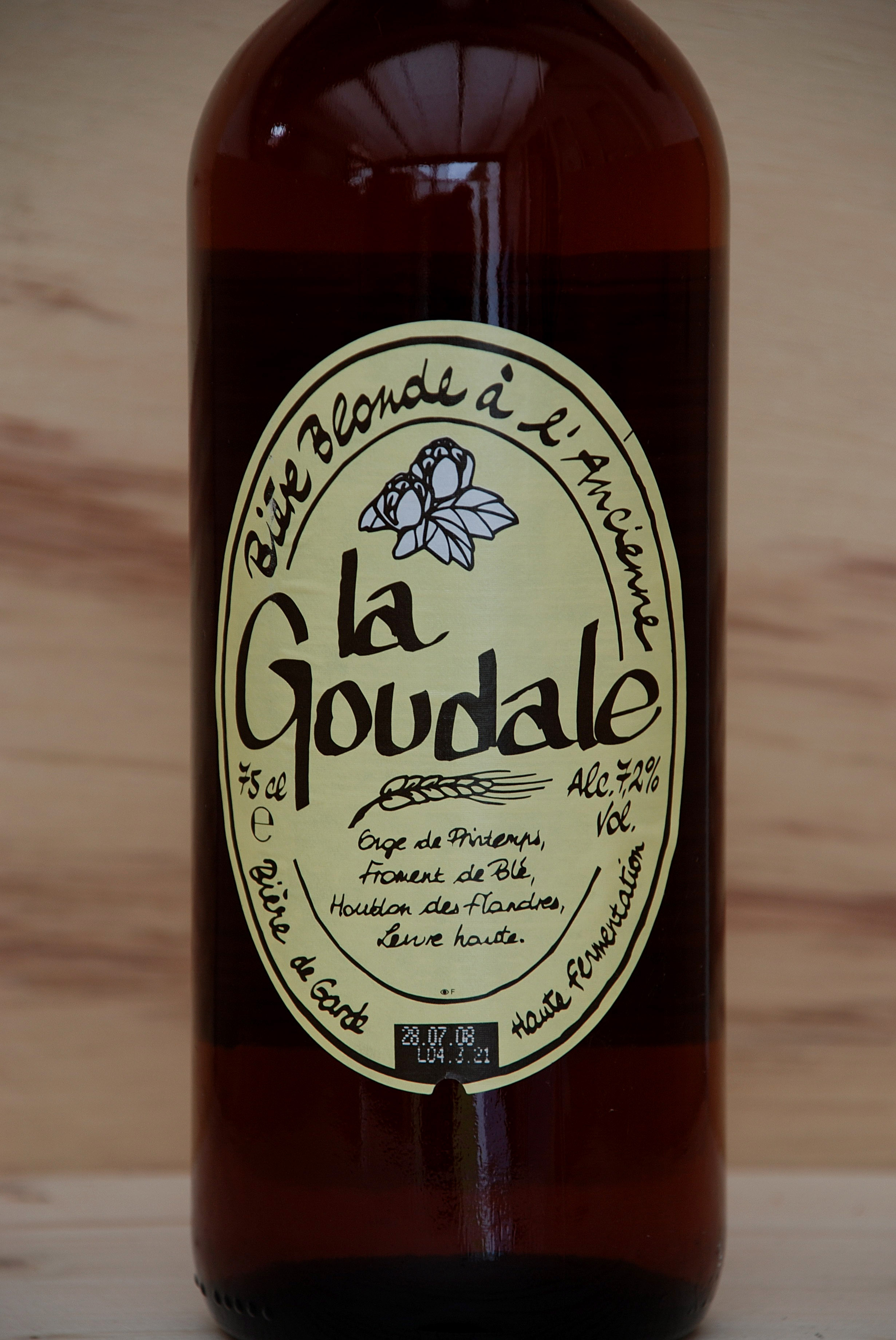
La goudale

La Goudale is a bière de garde which was originally brewed in Douai (northern France) by Les Brasseurs de Gayant. The brewery has since moved to Arques.

Its name derives from "good ale", the name given to local ales in the 14th century. It is a top-fermented beer of 7.2% ABV. It consists of three Flemish hop varieties, two malt varieties (pale and caramel), two other cereals (wheat and rice) and spices (coriander and bitter orange peels).

As the brewery now also makes beers which were inherited as a result of mergers, in the section products there will be beers which were not traditionally made by Goudale.

== Awards ==
- World Beer Award: World's best bière de garde 2008
- World Beer Challenge 2014, Portugal: Gold medal (for both La Goudale and G de Goudale Grand Cru)
- The Great International Beer Festival, Providence, USA, 2014: 2nd place
- Concours général agricole, Paris, 2019
  - Medaille d'Or (Gold Medal) – La Goudale
  - Medaille de Bronze (Bronze Medal) – G de Goudale Rhum Finish

== Products ==
Classic Goudale products:

- La Goudale, a blonde bière de garde and the flagship product of the brewery (7.2%)
- La Goudale Ambrée, an amber beer (7.2%)
- La Goudale IPA (7.2%)
- G de Goudale (7.9%)
  - Grand Cru
    - G de Goudale Grand Cru Mandarina uses a blend of raw hops and won the gold medal in the World Beer Challenge 2014, Portugal
    - G de Goudale Grand Cru Citra & Amarillo uses a blend of two U.S. hops: Amarillo and Citra which won the bronze medal 2015 at the World Beer Award in the category Belgian Style Strong Pale Ale
  - Rhum Finish
- La Goudale de Noël, a Christmas beer (7.2%)
- La Goudale de Printemps, a spring beer (6.8%)

The brewery makes a number of other varieties and brands including Secret des Moines, Belzebuth, Kekette and St Landelin among others. The brewery in Arques also has a microbrewery, allowing bespoke products to be brewed for specific customers. The brewery also owns the St Omer brewery, which makes Premium de St Omer.
