= Fontinettes boat lift =

Boat lift in Saint-Omer, France

Coordinates: 50.7317°N 2.3033°E

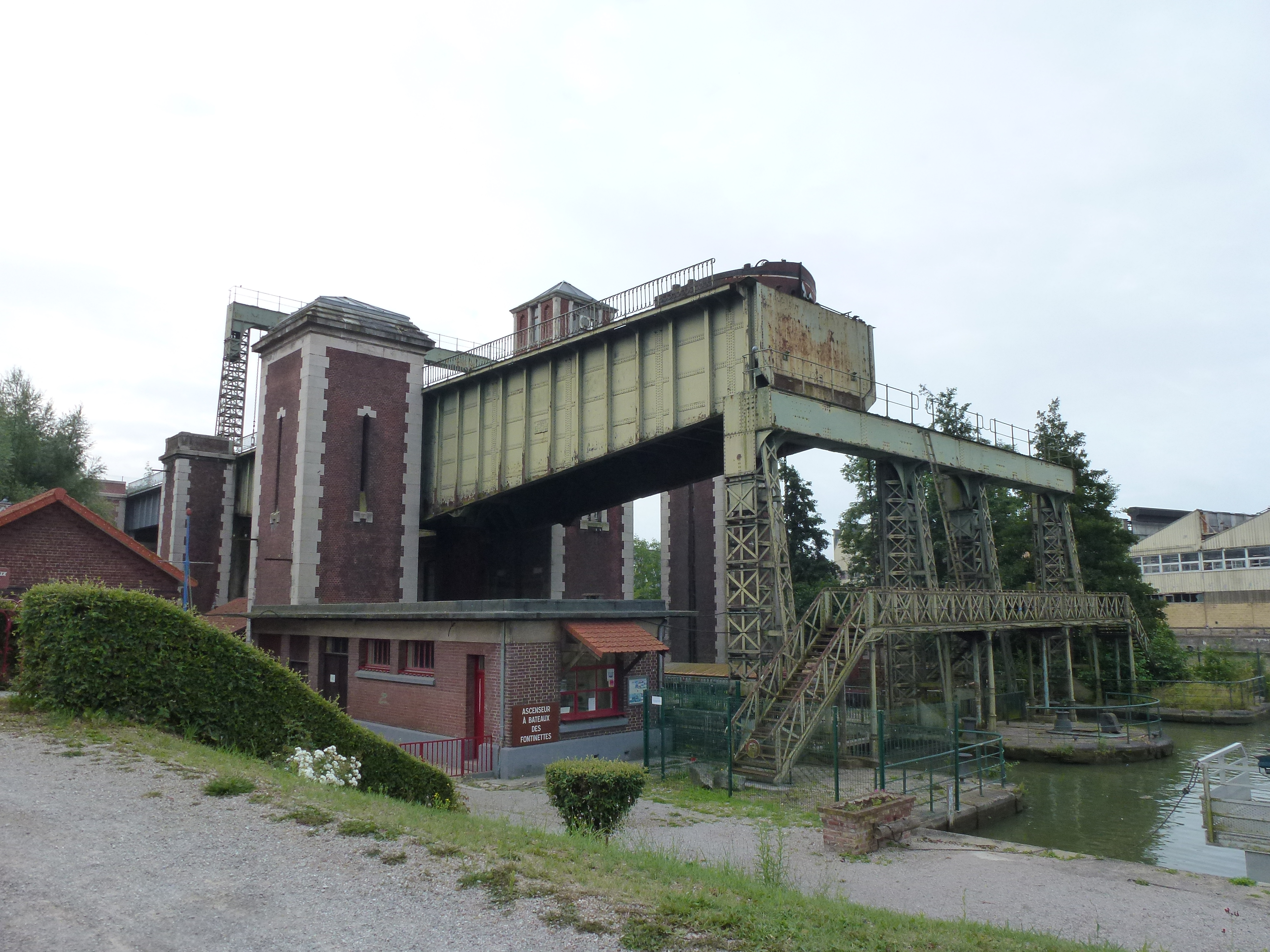
Arques (Pas-de-Calais) Ascenseur des Fontinettes

The Fontinettes boat lift (French: Ascenseur des Fontinettes or Ascenseur à bateaux des Fontinettes) was built in 1888 on the Canal de Neufossé and connected the river Aa and the Neuffossé Canal in Arques, near Saint-Omer in the Pas-de-Calais.

== Design ==
The boat lift was designed by Edwin Clark (who also designed the Anderton Boat Lift) and M. Bertin a French engineer. The metal was supplied by Société des anciens établissements Cail (now the Fives Group).

== Description ==
Study on the means of crossing the falls of the canals (Fontinettes), (Etude sur les moyens de franchir les chutes des canaux)

The Fontinettes Boat Lift was capable of lifting vessels of 300 tonnes displacement. It was designed to avoid the need to use five locks, which took some 90 minutes, to change height by 13 metres. It was inspired by the similar Anderton Boat Lift built in 1875 in Cheshire, England. The original five locks were kept in place until 1963 for use when the lift was being maintained.

The lift consists of two caissons each weighing 792 tonnes, including the lifting piston of 90 tonnes. Doors on the caissons and on the canal end are hydraulically powered, and sealing is effected by inflatable seals. In operation, the upper caisson is lowered and 64 tonnes of extra water is added. It is then raised again by hydraulic pressure from an accumulator, and when released, the two caissons exchange position. Six men were required to operate the lift, the balancing operation took only 5 minutes. All power, including to the workshop, came from water turbines.

The boat lift was built between 1885 and 1888 and worked until 1967. It was then replaced by a big, single lock (écluse des Fontinettes), built about 500m upstream. This lock can handle large barges and push-tows up to 144m long and 11.50m wide (or up to 6 smaller barges of Freycinet dimensions) and takes about 20–30 minutes to operate. The difference in level of 13.15m is 50 centimetres less than that of the original locks and lift.

The lift was rescued from demolition by a local conservation group and guided tours are available during the summer months for a small fee. There is also a small museum and workshop.

== Historical monument ==
The boat lift was awarded the status of Monument Historique in 2014.

== See also ==
- Boat lift

== Gallery ==
The old lock

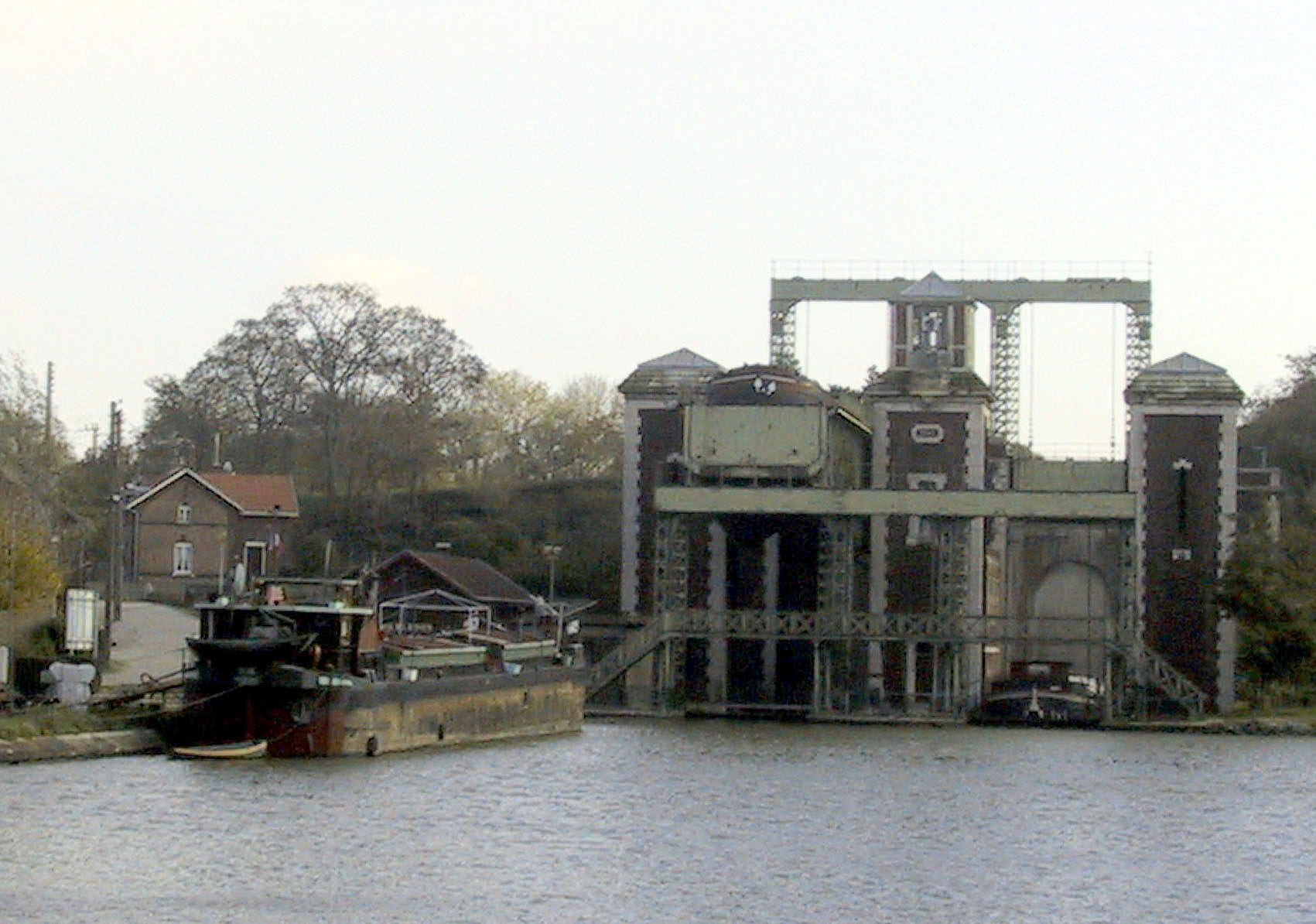
Fontinettes boat lift

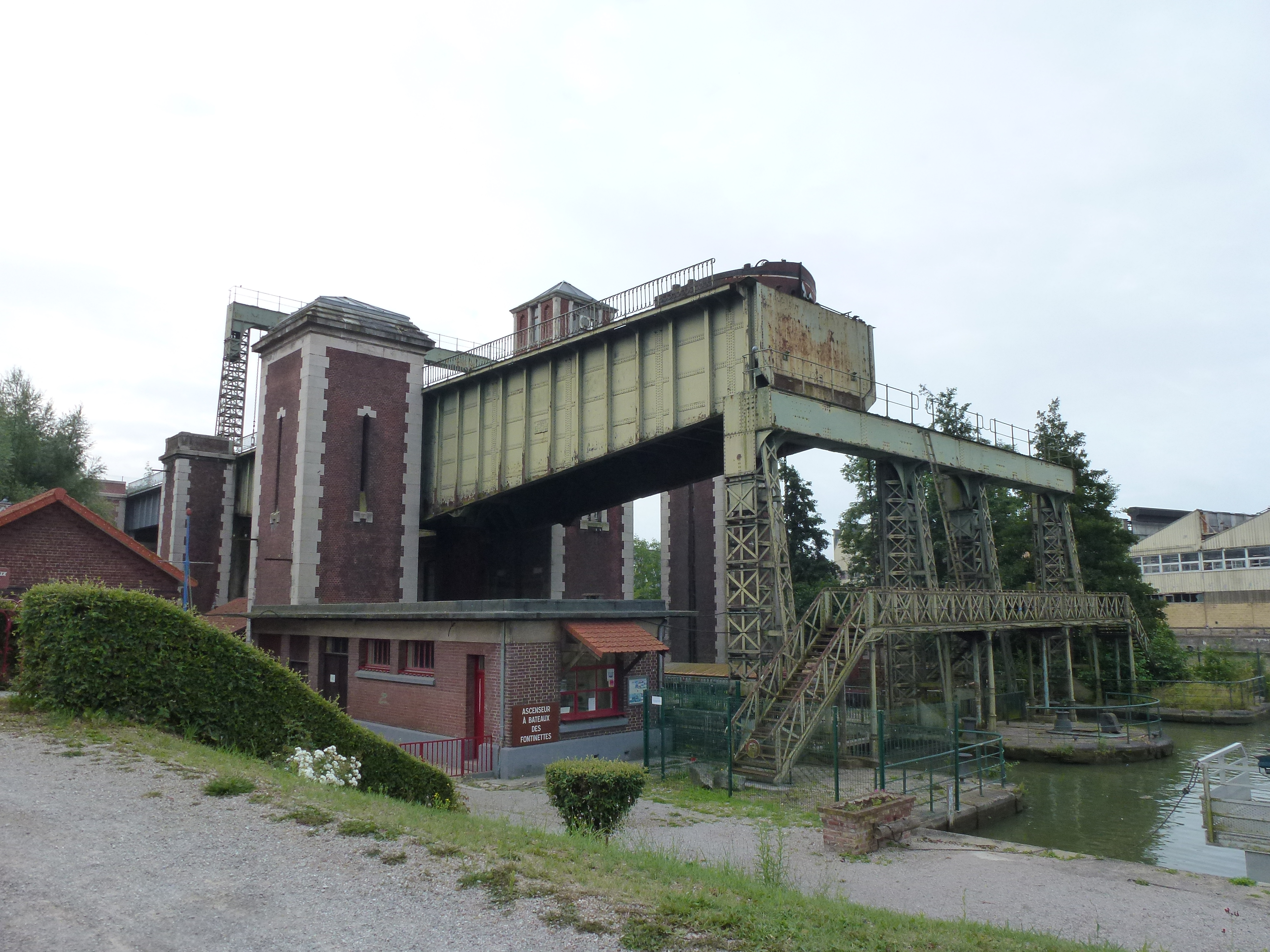
Fontinettes boat lift

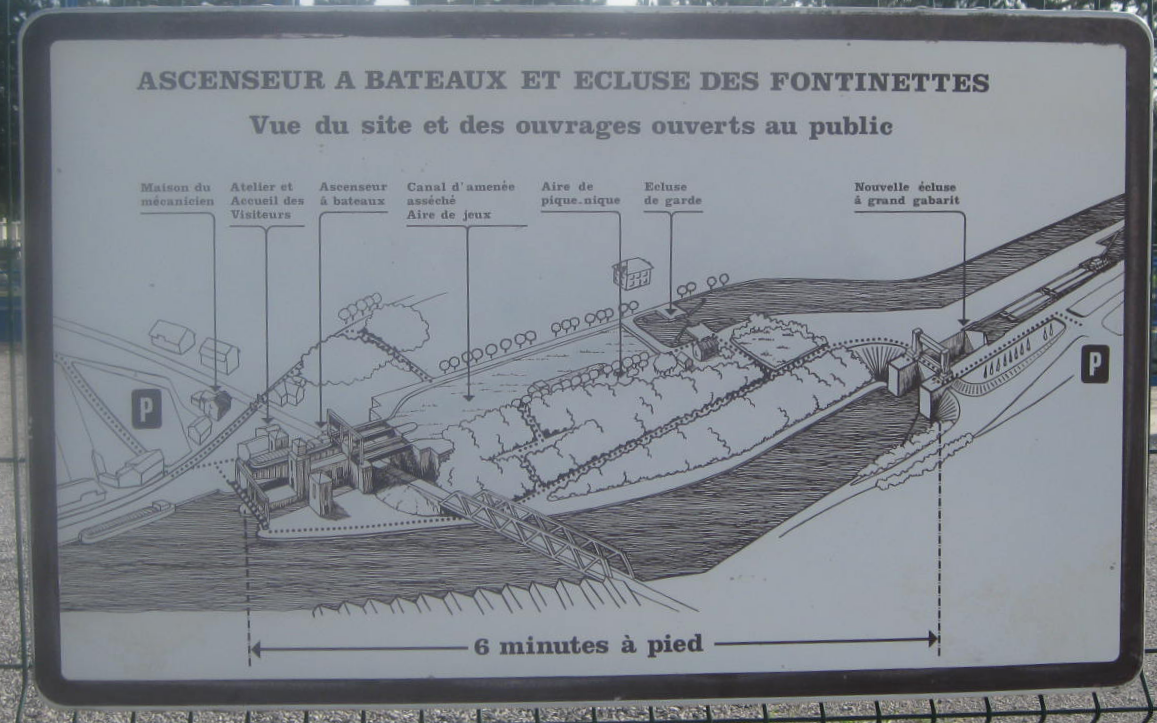
Sign describing the location

The new lock

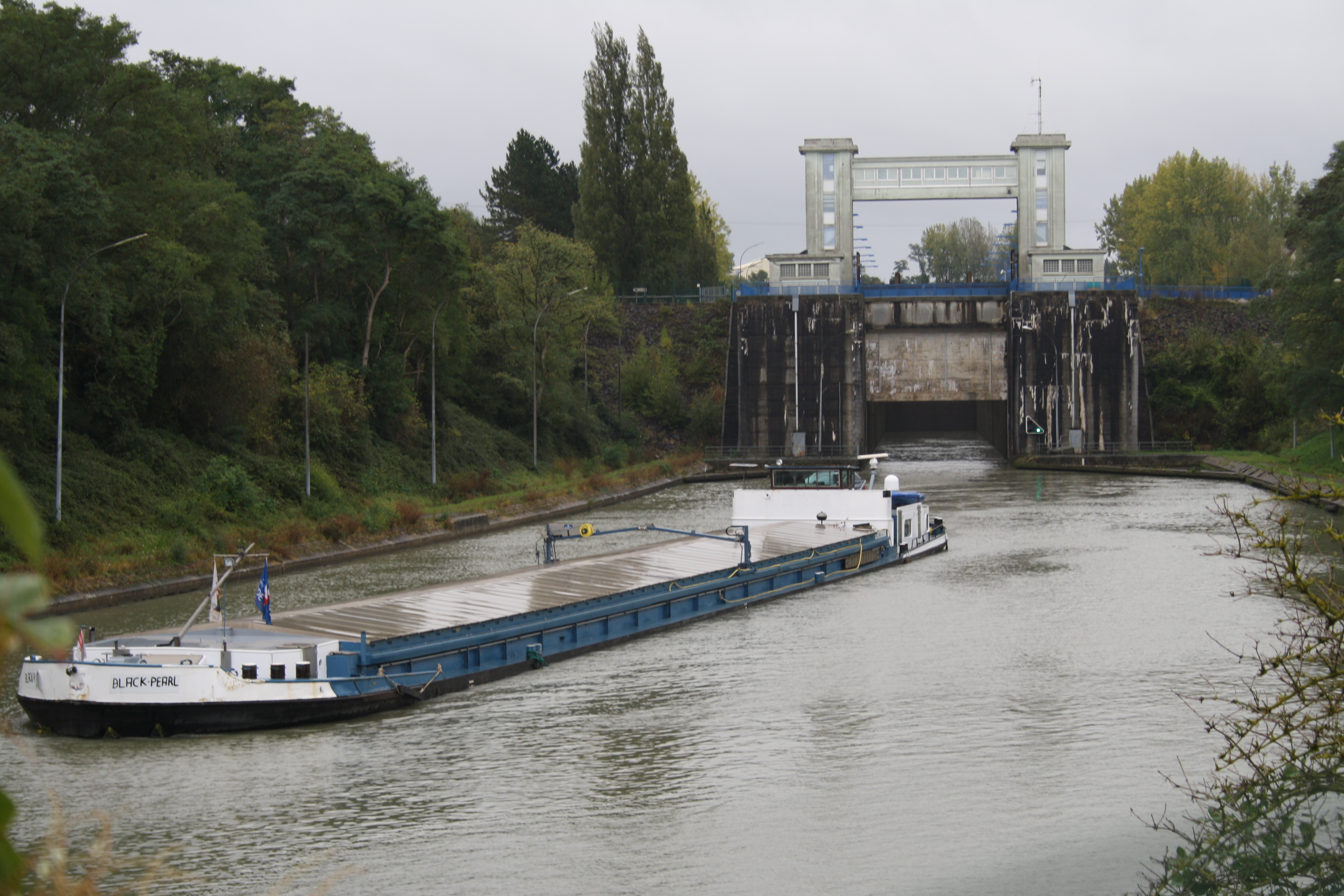
L'écluse des Fontinettes

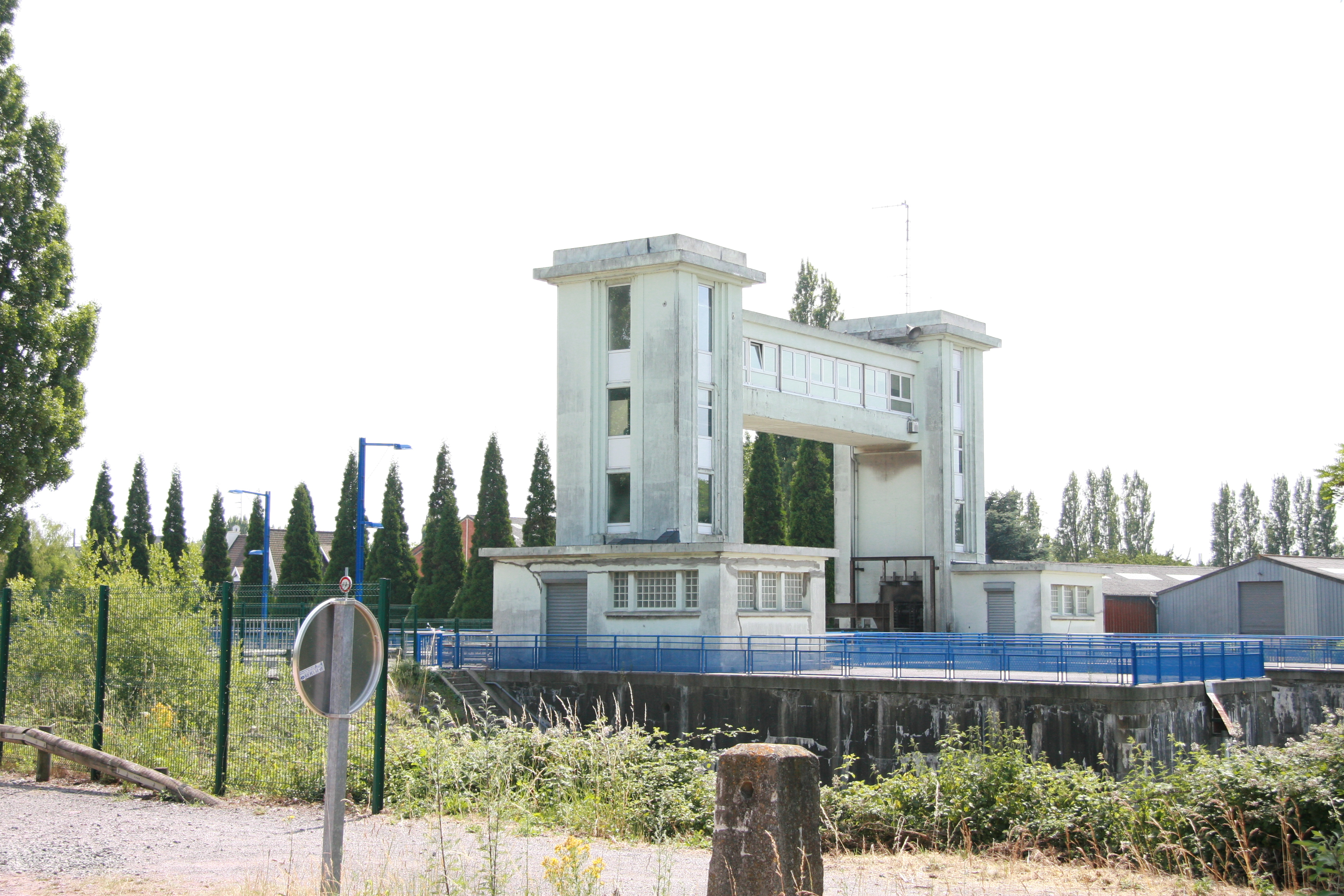
L'écluse des Fontinettes

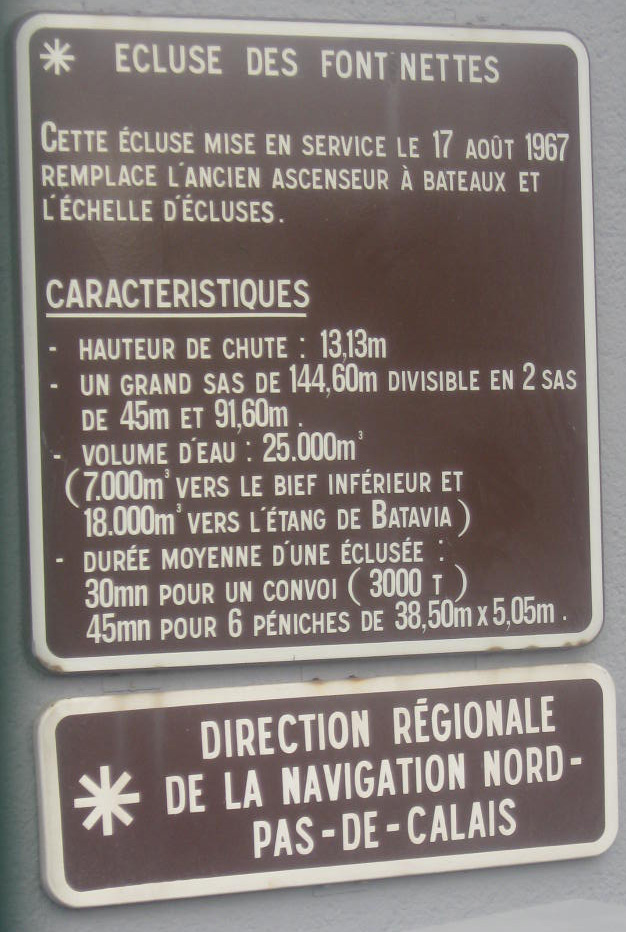
Sign describing the dimensions of the lock
