= Jean Desnouelles =

French abbot and chronicler

Jean Desnouelles was a 19th-century French abbot and chronicler. He was the Abbot of St. Vincent, Laon and author of numerous works. Desnouelles's Chronicon documented Norman and medieval France and he appears to have been an expert on France in the medieval period.
