= Arques, Pas-de-Calais =

Arques
- Commune
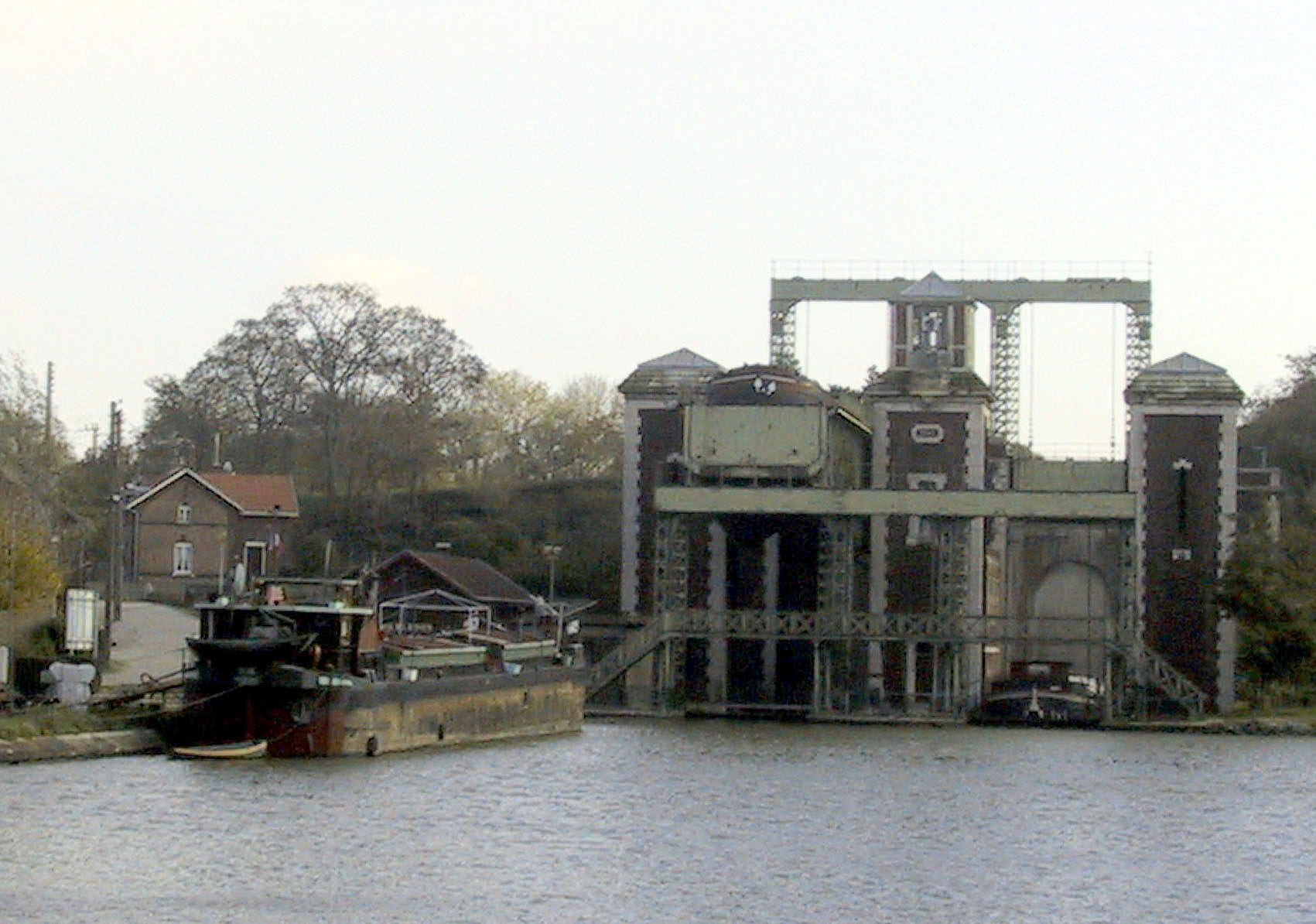
- The Fontinettes boat lift

- Coat of arms
- Location of Arques
- Location within France Location within Hauts-de-France
- Coordinates: 50°44′10″N 2°18′12″E
- Country: France
- Region: Hauts-de-France
- Department: Pas-de-Calais
- Arrondissement: Saint-Omer
- Canton: Longuenesse
- Intercommunality: CA Pays de Saint-Omer

Government
  - Mayor (2020–2026): Benoît Roussel
- Area^{1}: 22.41 km^{2} (8.65 sq mi)
- Elevation: 10 m (33 ft)
- Highest elevation: 62 m (203 ft)
- Lowest elevation: 2 m (6.6 ft)
- Population (2023): 9,431
  - Density: 420.8/km^{2} (1,090/sq mi)
- Time zone: UTC+01:00 (CET)
  - Summer (DST): UTC+02:00 (CEST)
- INSEE/Postal code: 62040 /62510
- ^{1} French Land Register data, which excludes lakes, ponds, glaciers > 1 km^{2} (0.386 sq mi or 247 acres) and river estuaries.

Arques (French pronunciation: [aʁk]) is a commune in the Pas-de-Calais department in northern France, bordering Saint-Omer.

== Geography ==
Arques is situated in the middle of the Hauts-de-France region, 40 km from Calais and Dunkerque, and 45 km from Boulogne-sur-Mer. It lies on the border of the departments of Pas-de-Calais and Nord.

The town is crossed by the Neufossé Canal, which connects the rivers Aa and Lys. The commune also includes several lakes—Beauséjour, Arc-en-ciel, Malhôve, Batavia—and part of the forest of Rihout-Clairmarais.

== History ==
Arques is in the region of French Flanders. As this area has been under Belgian, English, French and Spanish rule, many of the names are French versions of names in other languages.

In the wake of the Battle of the Golden Spurs a battle was fought here in April 1303 between French and Flemish. The Flemish were victorious in the Battle of Arques (1303). Arques is not to be confused with Arques-la-Bataille, where the Battle of Arques (1589) took place. It is also close to Agincourt.

It was one of the first towns in the region which subscribed to Agenda 21.

Possible Roman influence

There is a possibility of Arques being the Roman Port of 'Marcae' mentioned in the Litus Saxonicum as there appears to be research in the UK that the high sea levels were about 4.5 metres higher in late Roman times than that of today.

Arques is between Oudenberg and Boulogne (both Saxon Shore forts) and appears to be land if the sea level is raised 4.5 metres in which case would mean Arques would have been a well protected harbour inland from the town.

== Population ==
Historical population

Year	Pop.	±% p.a.
1793	1,531	—
1800	1,682	+1.35%
1806	1,691	+0.09%
1821	1,854	+0.62%
1831	2,190	+1.68%
1836	2,330	+1.25%
1841	2,601	+2.22%
1846	2,769	+1.26%
1851	2,771	+0.01%
1856	2,992	+1.55%
1861	3,456	+2.93%
1866	3,805	+1.94%
1872	4,080	+1.17%
1876	4,145	+0.40%
1881	4,270	+0.60%
1886	4,567	+1.35%
1891	4,284	−1.27%
1896	4,355	+0.33%
1901	4,302	−0.24%

Year	Pop.	±% p.a.
1906	4,478	+0.81%
1911	4,658	+0.79%
1921	4,613	−0.10%
1926	4,512	−0.44%
1931	4,696	+0.80%
1936	5,008	+1.29%
1946	5,222	+0.42%
1954	5,800	+1.32%
1962	7,224	+2.78%
1968	8,738	+3.22%
1975	10,042	+2.01%
1982	9,245	−1.17%
1990	9,014	−0.32%
1999	9,331	+0.38%
2007	9,656	+0.43%
2012	9,958	+0.62%
2017	9,753	−0.42%
2023	9,431	−0.56%

Source: EHESS and INSEE (1968-2023)

== Economy ==
Arques is famous for its crystal manufacture. It has been the headquarters of Arc International, the largest manufacturer of glassware in the world, since its inception in the 19th century.

== Places of interest ==
- The Fontinettes Boat Lift and the Arques lock (l'écluse des Fontinettes, not to be confused with l'ecluse de Flandres, a smaller lock, also in Arques)
- Arc International
- The Aa Valley Tourist Railroad (CFTVA: Chemin de Fer Touristique de la vallée de l'Aa) which runs between Arques and Lumbres
- The Audomarais marshes and the Parc naturel régional des caps et marais d'Opale (a park that runs from the Opal Coast landinwards)
- It is near the Forest of Éperlecques, which houses the Blockhaus d'Éperlecques
- The local church, château and town hall

There is a town walk which takes in most of these sites and can be downloaded from the town website.

The town is a ville fleurie and is rated with three flowers.

La Goudale have relocated to Arques from Douai, to a state of the art brewery which can be visited.

== See also ==
- Audomarois
- Communes of the Pas-de-Calais department
- Canton of Arques

== Gallery ==
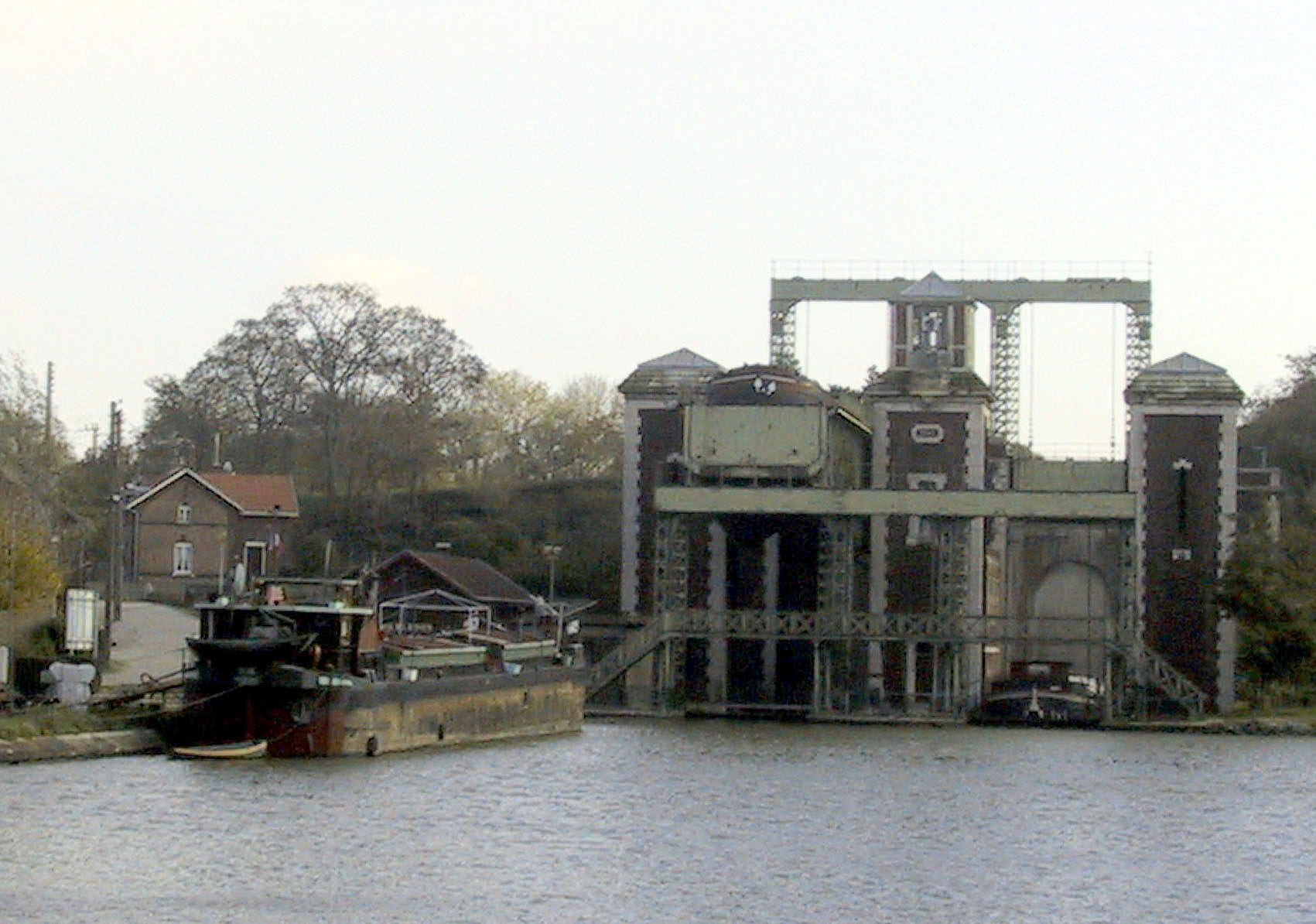
Fontinettes boat lift

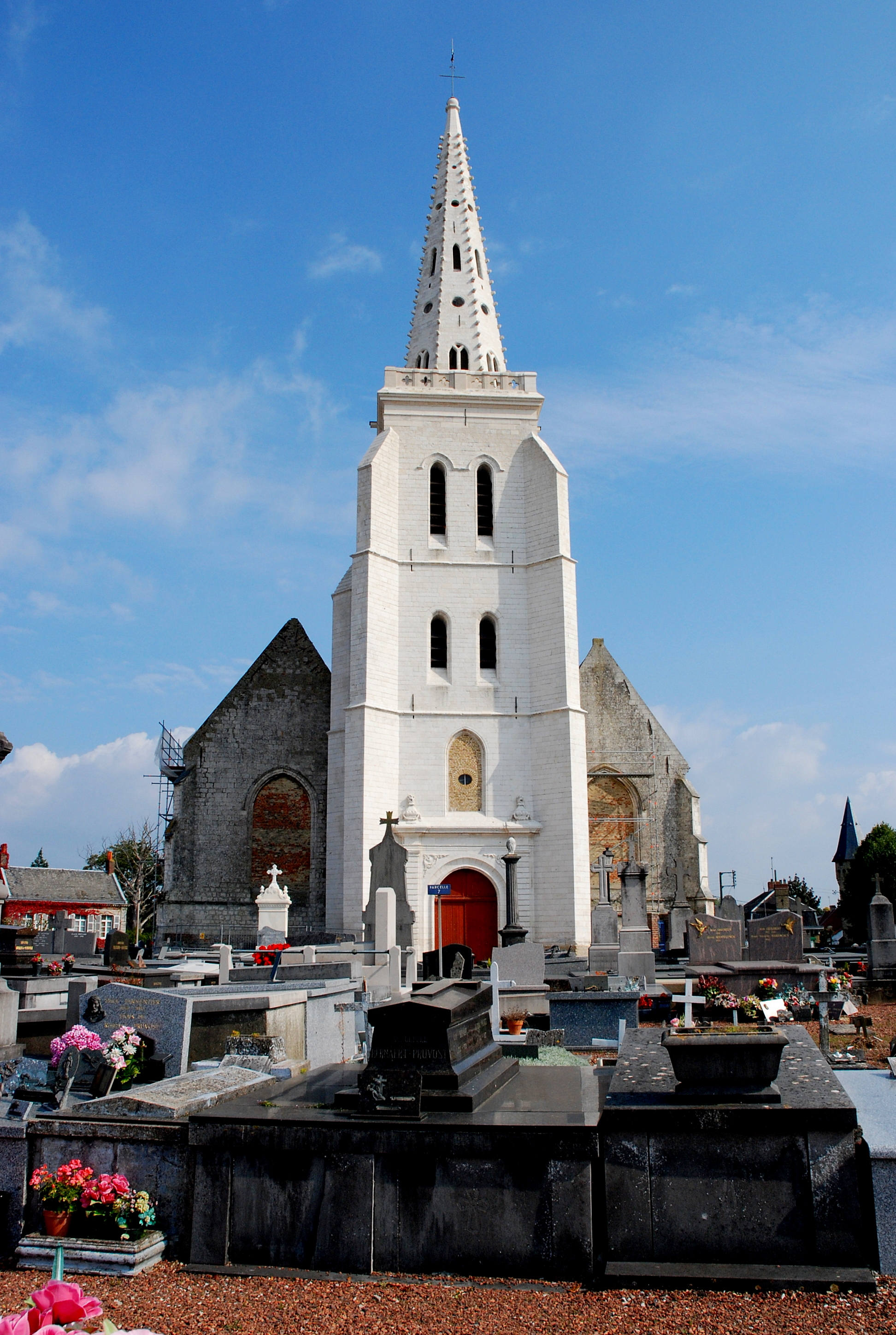
The church

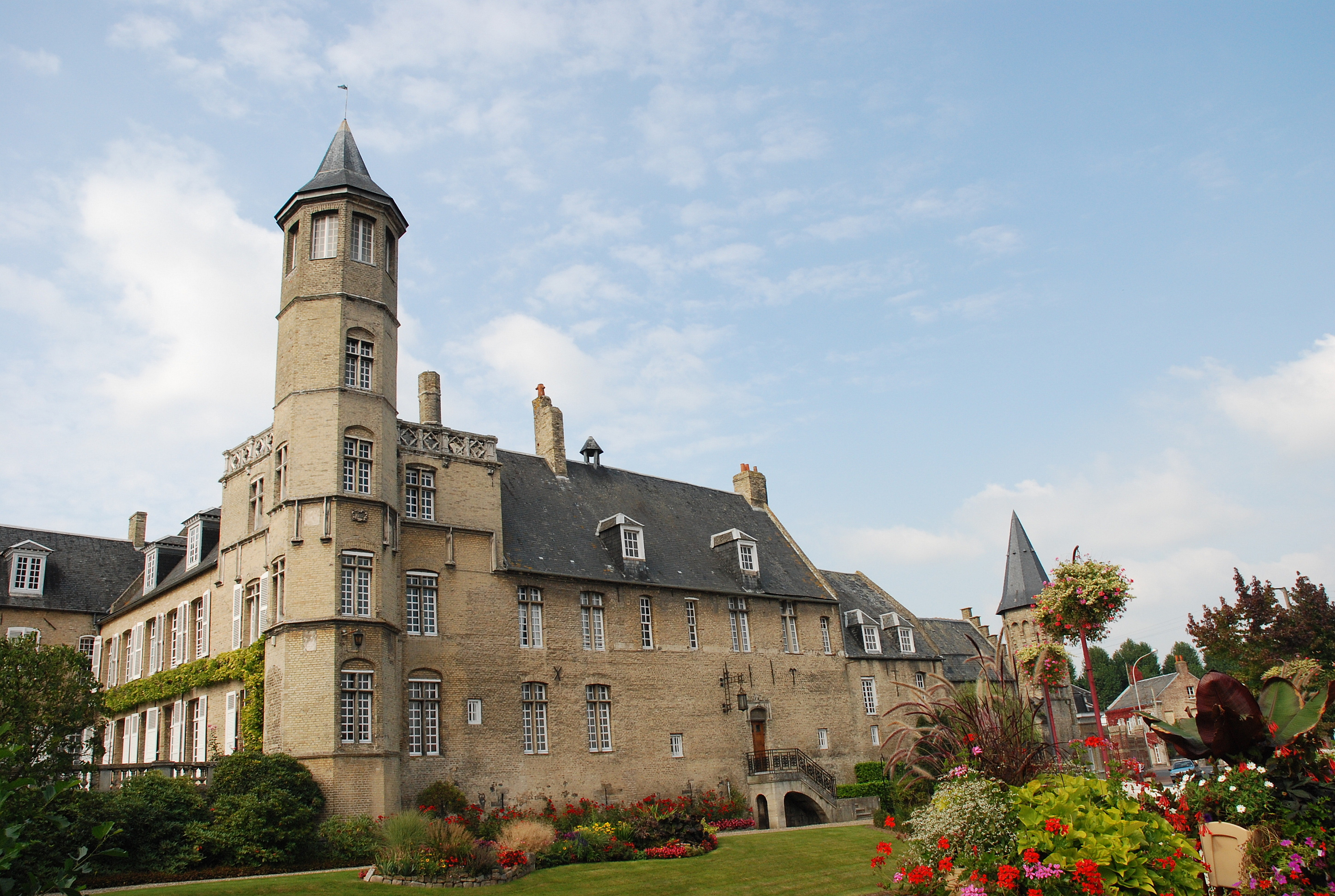
The Château

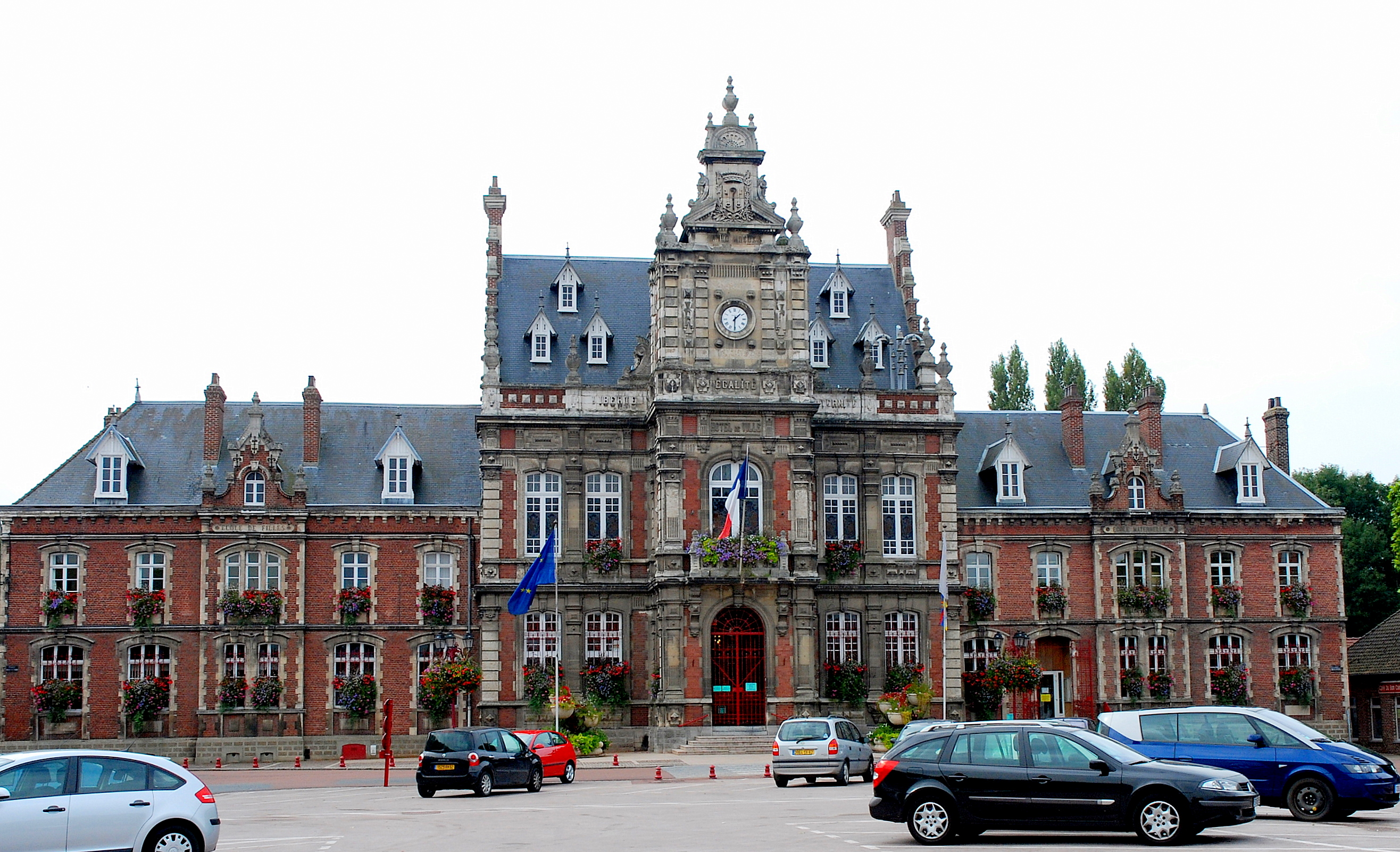
The Town Hall

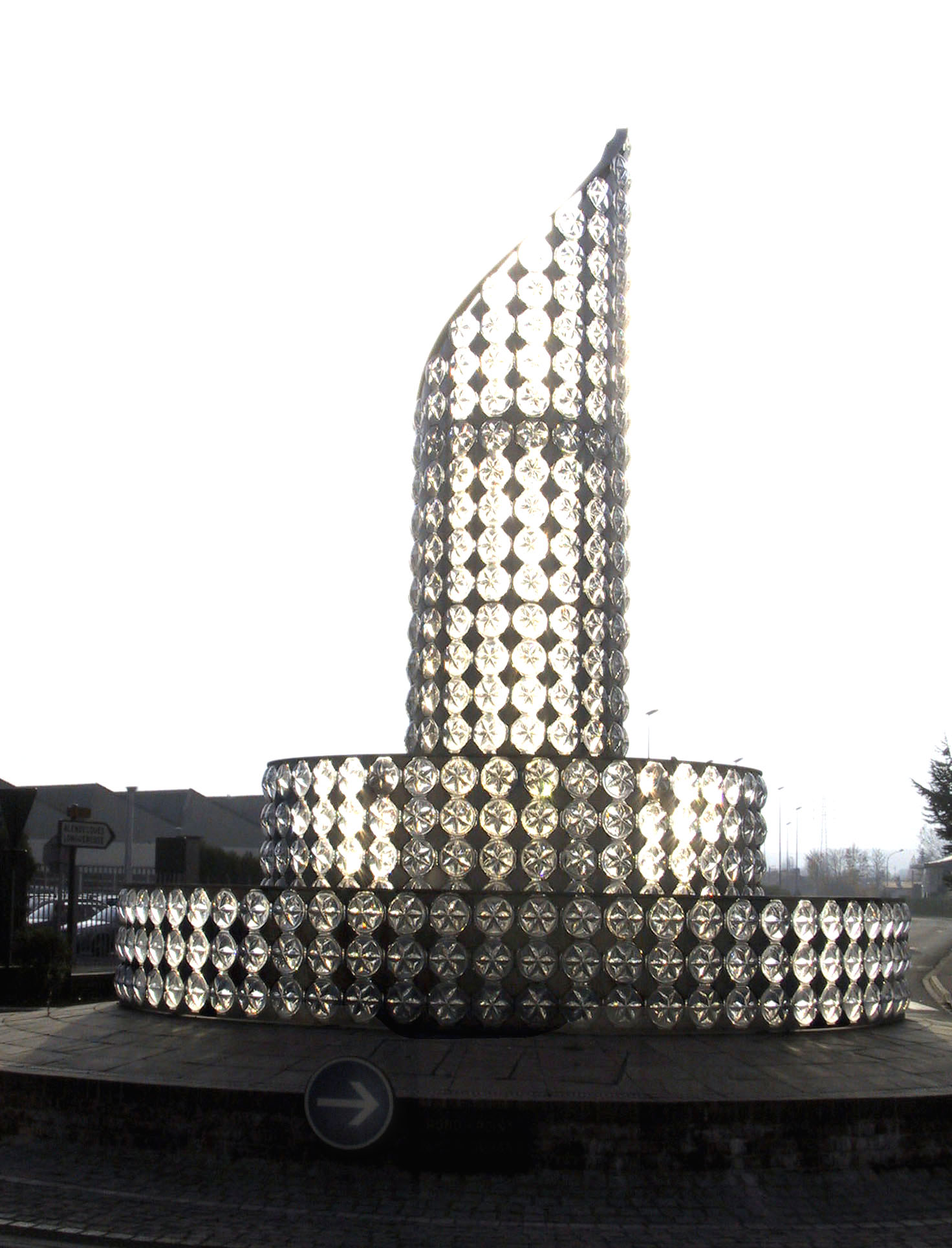
The "glass" roundabout
