= RAF Bottisham =

Royal Air Force station in England, 1940–1946

RAF Bottisham USAAF Station 374
- Near Bottisham, Cambridgeshire in England
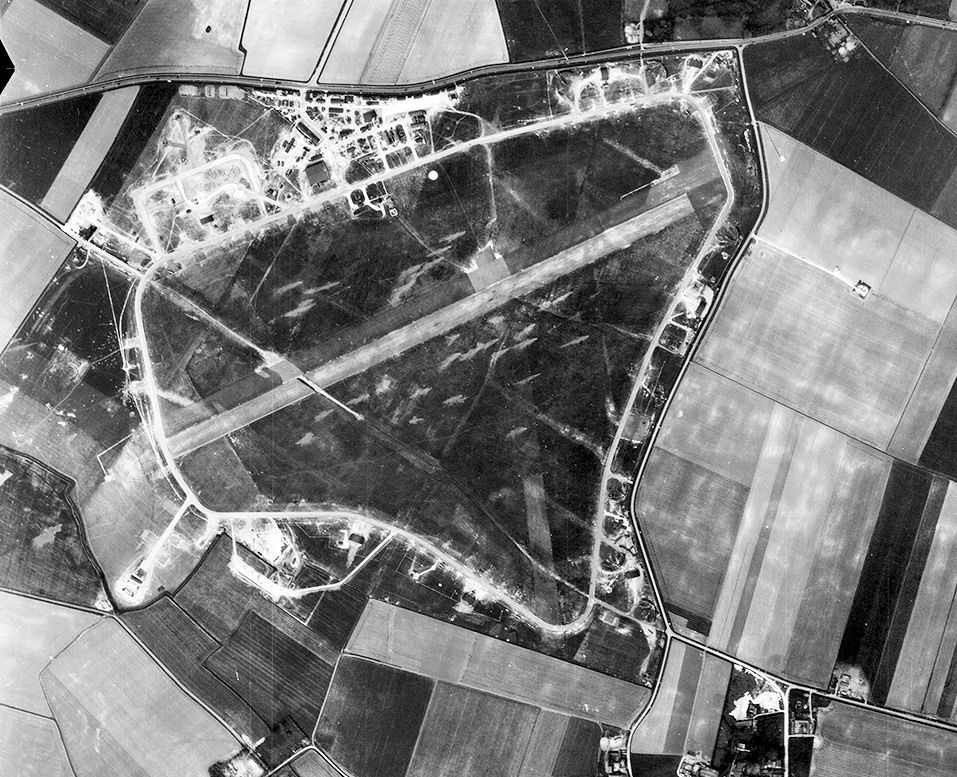
- Aerial photograph of Bottisham airfield, 19 April 1944

Site information
- Type: Royal Air Force station
- Code: IM
- Owner: Air Ministry
- Operator: Royal Air Force; United States Army Air Forces
- Controlled by: RAF Fighter Command; Eighth Air Force

Location
- Shown within Cambridgeshire RAF Bottisham (the United Kingdom)
- Coordinates: 52.2138°N 0.2571°E

Site history
- Built: 1940
- In use: 1940–1946
- Battles/wars: European Theatre of World War II; Air Offensive, Europe July 1942–May 1945

Airfield information
Runways
Direction	Length and surface
NE/SW	PSP
00/00	PSP

Royal Air Force Bottisham or more simply RAF Bottisham is a former Royal Air Force station located 5 miles (8 km) east of Cambridge, Cambridgeshire, England.

== History ==
=== RAF Fighter Command use ===
RAF Bottisham opened in March 1940 and was first used by bomb-armed de Havilland Tiger Moths transferred from No. 22 Elementary Flying Training School RAF (EFTS) to be prepared for possible anti-invasion duties. From October 1940 the airfield was used by 22 EFTS Tiger Moths as a Relief Landing Ground until 1941.

With the departure of the Tiger Moths, Bottisham was transferred to 241 Sqn Army Co-operation Command with Westland Lysanders, Curtiss Tomahawks, North American Mustang Mk 1's, moved to Ayr.

From 15 June 1942, the airfield was used by No. 652 Squadron RAF and No. 168 Squadron RAF.

A number of other Royal Air Force squadrons used the airfield before it was turned over to the United States Army Air Forces (USAAF):

- No. 2 Squadron RAF between 31 January 1943 and 19 March 1943 with detachments at RAF Westcott, RAF Newmarket, RAF Cranfield, RAF Duxford using the Mustang I. The squadron then moved to RAF Fowlmere.
- No. 4 Squadron RAF between 20 March 1943 and 16 July 1943 using the Tomahawk IIA and Mustang I. The squadron then moved to RAF Gravesend.
- No. 169 Squadron RAF between 10 March 1943 and 12 March 1943 with the Mustang I before moving to RAF Duxford.
- No. 268 Squadron RAF between 6 March 1943 and 10 March 1943 with the Mustang I. The squadron then moved to RAF Snailwell.
- No. 288 Squadron RAF between 18 January 1943 and March 1943 as a detachment from RAF Digby. The squadron used the Hawker Hurricane I, Boulton Paul Defiant I and Supermarine Spitfire Mk's VB and IX. The squadron then moved to RAF Coleby Grange.
- No. 400 Squadron RCAF between 18 June 1941 and 25 June 1941. The squadron used the Westland Lysander III and the Tomahawk Mk's I, IIA and IIB. The squadron then moved to RAF Odiham.
- No. 613 (City of Manchester) Squadron AAF between 7 March 1943 and 19 March 1943 with Mustang I before moving to RAF Ringway.
- No. 654 Squadron RAF between 20 November 1942 and 20 February 1943 moving to Gourock. The squadron used the Taylorcraft Plus C.2 and the Taylorcraft Auster Mk's I and III.
- No. 4 Flying Instructors School (Supplementary) RAF.
- No. 2761 Squadron RAF Regiment.
- RAF (Belgian) Training School.

=== United States Army Air Forces use ===
With the arrival of large numbers of USAAF fighter groups in 1943, Bottisham was allocated to the Americans and assigned designation as Station 374 (IM). The airfield was enlarged and areas of steel matting were laid.

USAAF Station Units assigned to RAF Bottisham were:

- 50th Service Group (VIII Air Force Service Command)

468th and 469th Services Squadrons; HHS 50th Service Group

- 18th Weather Squadron
- 66th Station Complement Squadron
- 1073rd Quartermaster Company
- 1097th Signal Company
- 1184th Military Police Company
- 1598th Ordnance Supply & Maintenance Company
- 2118th Engineer Fire Fighting Platoon

==== 361st Fighter Group ====
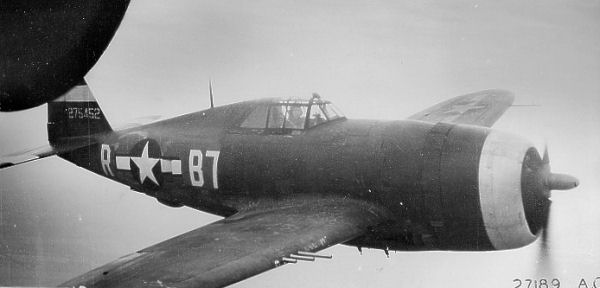
P-47D-11-RE Thunderbolt aircraft Serial 42-75452 of the 374th Fighter Squadron, 361st Fighter Group, based at Bottisham.

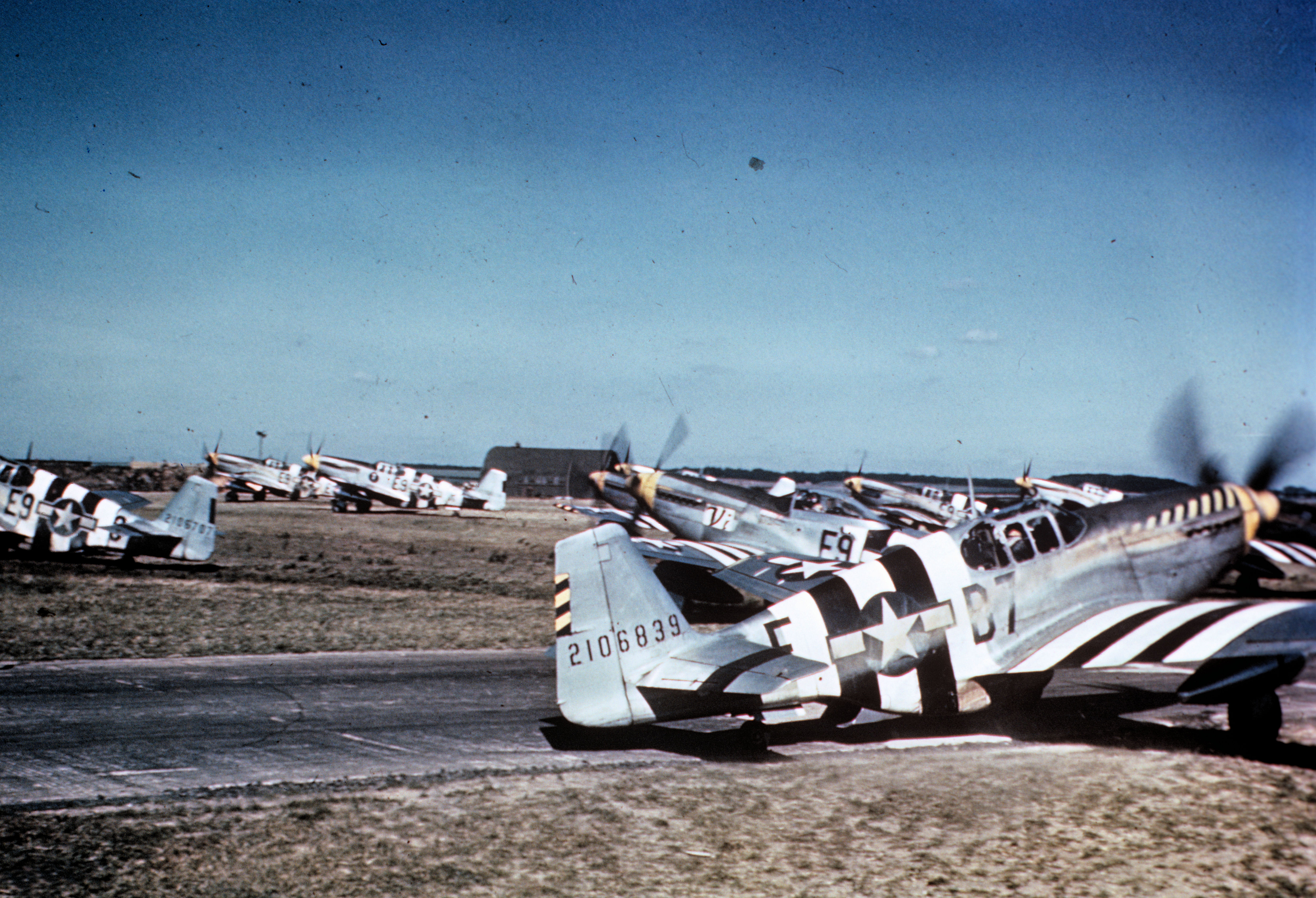
P-51 Mustangs, including (E9-S, serial number 42-106707) nicknamed "Sleepytime Gal", (B7-E, serial number 42-106839) nicknamed "Bald Eagle III" and (E9-K) nicknamed "Vi" of the 361st Fighter Group line up for take off on D-Day at Bottisham.

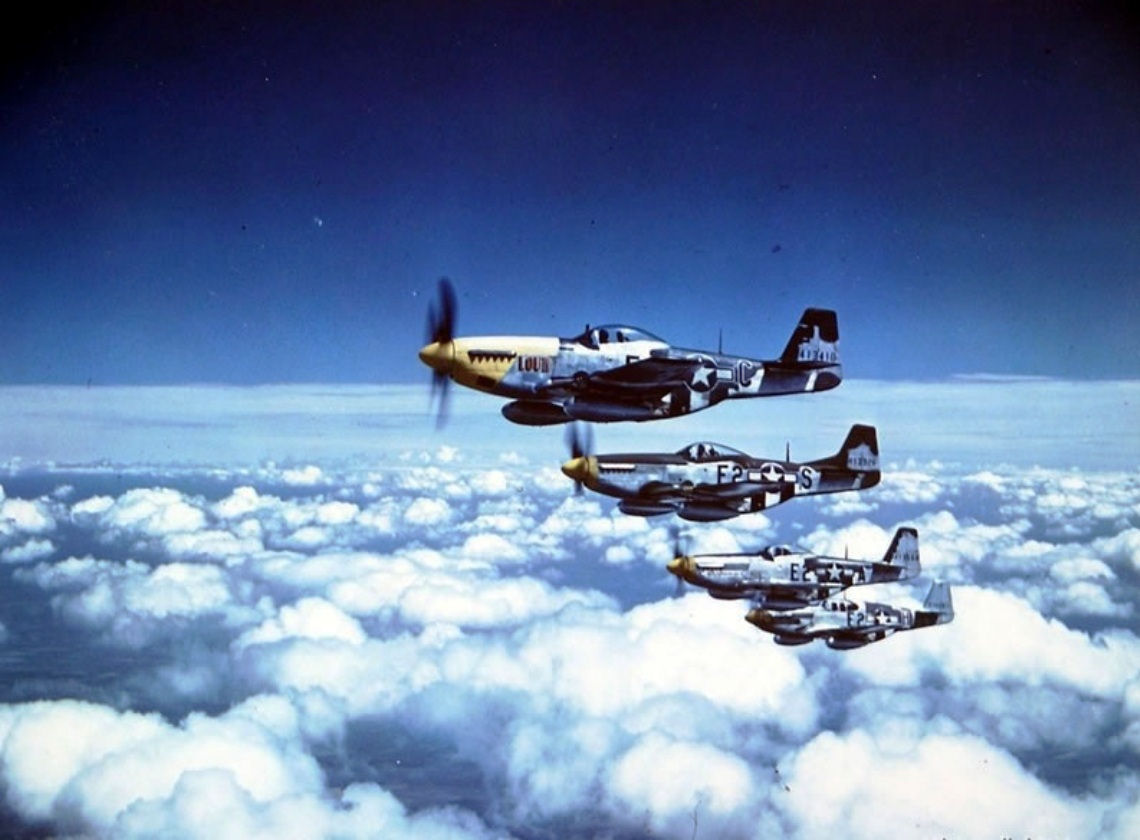
"The Bottisham Four", four USAAF North American P-51 Mustang fighters from the 375th Fighter Squadron, 361st Fighter Group, from Bottisham, in flight on 26 July 1944. All four aircraft were lost or crashed by the end of the war in Europe.

The airfield was first used by the United States Army Air Forces Eighth Air Force 361st Fighter Group, arriving from Richmond AAF, Virginia on 30 November 1943. The group was under the command of the 65th Fighter Wing of the VIII Fighter Command. Aircraft of the group were identified by yellow around their cowlings and tails.

The group consisted of the following squadrons:

- 374th Fighter Squadron (B7)
- 375th Fighter Squadron (E2)
- 376th Fighter Squadron (E9)

The 361st FG entered combat with Republic P-47 Thunderbolt aircraft on 21 January 1944 and converted to North American P-51 Mustang's in May 1944. The unit served primarily as an escort organisation, covering the penetration, attack, and withdrawal of Boeing B-17 Flying Fortress/Consolidated B-24 Liberator bomber formations that the USAAF sent against targets on the Continent.

The group also engaged in counter-air patrols, fighter sweeps, and strafing and dive-bombing missions. It attacked such targets as aerodromes, marshalling yards, missile sites, industrial areas, ordnance depots, oil refineries, trains, and highways. It participated in the assault against the German Air Force and aircraft industry during Big Week, 20–25 February 1944; the Normandy invasion, June 1944 and the Saint-Lô breakthrough in July.

The weight of the heavy P-47 fighters soon began to tell on the wet surface making take-offs tricky. A team of American engineers was called in during January 1944 and, in three days, they constructed a 1,470-yard-long runway with pierced-steel planking. This feat was considered a record for laying this type of prefabricated surfacing. The runway, which was aligned NE-SW, became the main one at Bottisham, the other also being constructed of PSP.

In September 1944 the 361st FG moved to RAF Little Walden when it became available after the departure of the 409th Bombardment Group (Light) for France. Little Walden was a Class A airfield with concrete runways and much better facilities than were available at Bottisham.

== Post-war use ==
From mid-1945 until 5 January 1946 Bottisham was used temporarily by Belgian airmen until being closed. Today, few traces of Bottisham remain as the land has all been reclaimed for farming, however a few buildings remain in use. The outline of the PSP runway can still be seen, but now as a long thick row of trees. Also the track which intersected the PSP runway towards the SW end is now a permanent road which cuts through this row of trees. There is now a volunteer-run museum at the former site, in honour of the RAF and USAF personnel who were stationed there during the war.

=== Bottisham Airfield Museum ===
The museum opened in 2009 and is the only UK museum dedicated to the Royal Air Force, United States 8th Army Air Force and Belgian Air Forces. It operates out of the last remaining buildings within the airfield's original perimeter.

The purchase of the site was completed in September 2014 and, since then renovation and restoration of the airfield buildings and restoration to their original appearance has been in process. A new Nissen hut has been installed in the original position of one located there in 1944.

== See also ==
- List of former Royal Air Force stations
