= 376th Fighter Squadron =

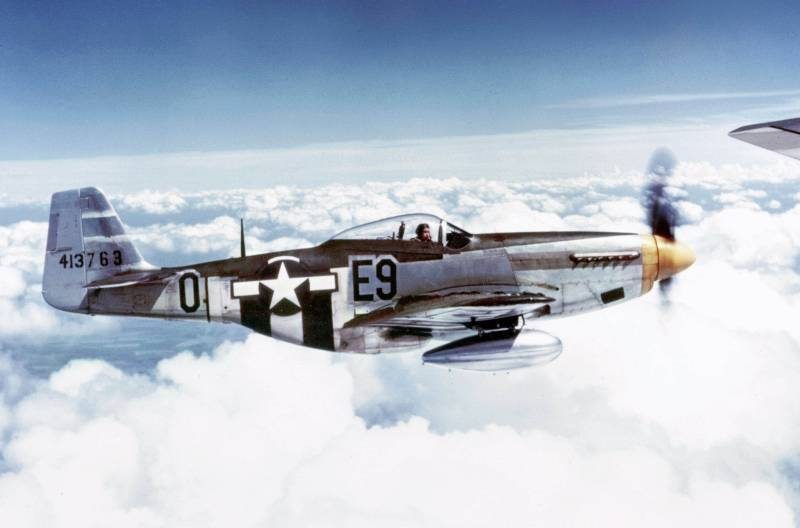
- Squadron P-51 Mustang
- Active: 1943–1945
- Country: United States
- Branch: United States Air Force
- Role: Fighter
- Engagements: European Theater of Operations

Insignia
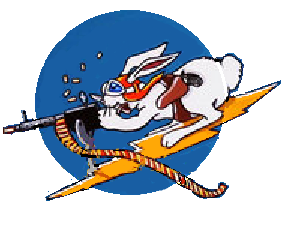
- 376th Fighter Squadron emblem (Note: Approved 17 June 1943.)
- World War II fuselage code: E9

The 376th Fighter Squadron is an inactive United States Air Force unit. Its last was assigned to the 361st Fighter Group, VIII Fighter Command, stationed at Camp Myles Standish, Massachusetts. It was inactivated on 23 October 1945. In 1985, the squadron was consolidated with the 376th Air Refueling Squadron

== History ==
Established in early 1943 as the 376th Fighter Squadron and equipped with P-47 Thunderbolts, the squadron trained under I Fighter Command in the mid-Atlantic states. Also flew air-defense missions as part of the Philadelphia Fighter Wing. Deployed to the European Theater of Operations (ETO), being assigned to VIII Fighter Command in England, November 1943.

The unit served primarily as an escort organization, covering the penetration, attack, and withdrawal of B-17/B-24 bomber formations that the USAAF sent against targets on the Continent. The squadron also engaged in counter-air patrols, fighter sweeps, and strafing and dive-bombing missions. Attacked such targets as airdromes, marshalling yards, missile sites, industrial areas, ordnance depots, oil refineries, trains, and highways. During its operations, the unit participated in the assault against the Luftwaffe and aircraft industry during the Big Week, 20–25 February 1944, and the attack on transportation facilities prior to the Normandy invasion and support of the invasion forces thereafter, including the Saint-Lô breakthrough in July.

The squadron supported the airborne attack on the Netherlands in September 1944 and deployed to Chievres Airdrome, (ALG A-84), Belgium between February and April 1945 flying tactical ground support missions during the airborne assault across the Rhine. The unit returned to Little Walden and flew its last combat mission on 20 April 1945. Demobilized during the summer of 1945 in England, inactivated in the United States as a paper unit in October.

== Lineage ==
- Constituted 376th Fighter Squadron on 28 January 1943

Activated on 10 February 1943
Inactivated on 10 November 1945

=== Assignments ===
- 361st Fighter Group, 10 February 1943 – 10 November 1945

=== Stations ===
- Richmond Army Air Base, Virginia, 10 February 1943
- Camp Springs Army Air Field, Maryland, 26 May 1943
- Millville Army Air Field, New Jersey, 15 August 1943
- Camp Springs Army Air Field, Maryland, 18 September 1943
- Richmond Army Air Base, Virginia, 30 September – 11 November 1943
- RAF Bottisham (AAF-374), England, 30 November 1943
- RAF Little Walden (AAF-165), England, ca. 28 September 1944

Operated from St-Dizier Airfield (A-64), France, 23 December 1944 – 1 February 1945

- Chievres Airdrome (A-84), Belgium, 1 February 1945
- RAF Little Walden (AAF-165), England, 7 April – ca. 11 October 1945
- Camp Kilmer, New Jersey, 23–24 October 1945

=== Aircraft ===
- Republic P-47 Thunderbolt, 1943–1944
- North American P-51D Mustang, 1944–1945
