= ABC =

ABC, abc, or Abc commonly refers to:

- ABC, the first three letters of the Latin script

ABC, abc, or Abc may also refer to:

== Arts, media, and entertainment ==
=== Broadcasting ===
- American Broadcasting Company, a commercial American TV broadcaster
  - Disney–ABC Television Group, the former name of the parent organization of ABC
- Australian Broadcasting Corporation, one of the national publicly funded broadcasters of Australia
  - ABC Television (Australian TV network), the national television network of the Australian Broadcasting Corporation
    - ABC TV (Australian TV channel), the flagship TV station of the Australian Broadcasting Corporation
    - ABC Canberra (TV station), Canberra, and other ABC TV local stations in state capitals
    - ABC Australia (Southeast Asian TV channel), an international pay TV channel
  - ABC Radio (disambiguation), several radio stations
- Aliw Broadcasting Corporation, a Philippine broadcast company
- Associated Broadcasting Corporation, the former name of TV5 Network, Inc., a Philippine media company
  - ABC-5, the former name of TV5, a Philippine free-to-air television network
- ABC (Swedish TV programme), a former Swedish regional news programme
- ABC Weekend TV, a former British television company
- Asahi Broadcasting Corporation, a Japanese commercial television and radio station
- Associated Broadcasting Company, a former name of Associated Television, a British television company
- African Barter Company, a pan-African barter broadcast syndication company
- TVP ABC, a Polish children's television channel
- ABC Television-Africa, a defunct Sierra Leone television channel
- Asociación Boliviana de Canales, a defunct Bolivian television network

=== Music ===
==== Albums ====
- ABC (Jin album), 2007, by rapper MC Jin
- ABC (Kreidler album), 2014, by Kreidler
- ABC (The Jackson 5 album), 1970, by The Jackson 5

==== Groups ====
- A.B.C., the former name of Japanese boy band A.B.C-Z
- ABC (band), an English pop band
- Acid Black Cherry, a Japanese rock band
- Active Bird Community, an American indie rock band
- Alien Beat Club, a Danish pop and R&B band
- Andrus, Blackwood and Company, a Christian pop and R&B duo
- Another Bad Creation, an American hip hop and new jack swing group

==== Labels ====
- ABC Classics, an Australian record label
- ABC Records, an American record label

==== Other uses in music ====
- ABC song (disambiguation), several songs
- ABC notation, a musical notation language
- O_{2} ABC Glasgow, a music venue

=== Periodicals ===
- ABC (magazine), an Italian magazine (1960-1977)
- ABC (newspaper), a Spanish daily newspaper (founded 1903)
- ABC (Monterrey newspaper), a Mexican newspaper (founded 1985)
- ABC Color, a Paraguayan newspaper (founded 1967)
- Audit Bureau of Circulations, a private organization that provides industry-agreed standards for media brand measurement of print publications and other media outlets
  - Audit Bureau of Circulations (India), a non-profit circulation-auditing organisation
  - Audit Bureau of Circulations (North America), the former name for the North American non-profit industry organization Alliance for Audited Media
  - Audit Bureau of Circulations (UK), a non-profit organisation

=== Literature ===
- Alphabet book, a type of children's book listing and depicting the letters
- America's Best Comics, an imprint of DC Comics
- Accessible Books Consortium, a subunit of the World Intellectual Property Organization
- Austin Bat Cave, a creative writing nonprofit organization in Texas

=== Other uses in arts, media, and entertainment ===
- ABC Cinemas, a British cinema chain

== Economics and law ==
=== Retailers ===
- ABC (Lebanon), a chain of department stores and shopping centers, and operator of fashion boutiques in Lebanon
- ABC Stores, a chain of convenience stores in Hawaii

=== Banks ===
- Agricultural Bank of China, in the People's Republic of China
- Bank ABC, an international bank headquartered in Bahrain

=== Other uses in economics and law ===
- ABC analysis, an inventory categorization technique
- Activity-based costing, an accounting method
- Assignment for the benefit of creditors, a concept in bankruptcy law
- ABC trial, of Crispin Aubrey, John Berry, and Duncan Campbell in 1978 in the UK

== Education ==
- ABC strategy (abstinence, be faithful, use a condom), a sex-education strategy
- ABC Learning, a former Australian childcare business
- Academia Británica Cuscatleca, a school in Santa Tecla, El Salvador
- Afrikan Black Coalition, a University of California student organization
- Andres Bonifacio College, Dipolog City, Philippines

== Food and beverage ==
- Air batu campur, also known as ais kacang, a Malaysian dessert
- ABC (food), an Indonesian-based food division of the H. J. Heinz Company
- Aerated Bread Company, a British bakery and tea-room chain
- Alcoholic Beverage Control, or Alcoholic Beverage Commission, a U.S. state's regulatory control over the wholesaling or retailing of some or all categories of alcoholic beverages
- Appalachian Brewing Company, an American brewery

== Places ==
- ABC countries, Argentina, Brazil, and Chile
- ABC Islands (Alaska), Admiralty Island, Baranof Island, and Chichagof Island
- ABC islands (Leeward Antilles), Aruba, Bonaire, and Curaçao
- ABC Region, an industrial area outside of São Paulo, Brazil
- Appa Balwant Chowk, area of Pune, India, noted for its bookshops

== Politics and unions ==
- Abantu Batho Congress, a South African political party
- ABC (Cuba), a Cuban political organization 1931–1952, named after the system for labeling its clandestine cells
- ABC Vancouver, a municipal political party in Vancouver, Canada
- A Better Calgary Party, a municipal political party in Calgary, Canada
- All Basotho Convention, a political party in Lesotho
- Alliance for Barangay Concerns, a political party in the Philippines
- American Bakery and Confectionery Workers' International Union, a predecessor of the Bakery, Confectionery, Tobacco Workers and Grain Millers' International Union
- Americans Battling Communism, an anti-communist organization founded in 1947
- Anarchist Black Cross, an anarchist support organization
- Anything But Conservative, a 2008 Canadian political campaign
- Armagh City, Banbridge and Craigavon Borough Council, a local government council in Northern Ireland
- Association of Barangay Captains, or Association of Barangay Councils, the former names of the Philippine organization now known as the Liga ng mga Barangay
- Association of British Counties, a non-party-political society

== Religious ==
- American Baptist Convention, the former name of American Baptist Churches US
- Association of Baptist Churches in Ireland, in Ireland and the UK

== Science and technology ==
=== Biology and medicine ===
==== Psychology ====
- ABC data collection, a descriptive functional behavior assessment method in applied behavior analysis
- Affective-behavioral-cognitive model, an attitude component model

==== Zoology ====
- Alien big cat, a large feline outside its indigenous range
- American Bird Conservancy, a nonprofit membership organization
- Australian Bird Count, a project of the Royal Australasian Ornithologists Union

==== Other uses in biology and medicine ====
- Association of Black Cardiologists, a North American nonprofit organization
- Abacavir, an antiretroviral drug used to treat HIV/AIDS
- ABC (medicine), a mnemonic for "Airway, Breathing, Circulation"
- ABC model of flower development, a genetic model
- Abortion–breast cancer hypothesis, a posited connection between breast cancer and abortion
- Aneurysmal bone cyst, a kind of lesion
- ATP-binding cassette transporter, a transmembrane protein

=== Computing ===
==== Hardware ====
- ABC, a line of computers by Dataindustrier AB
- Acorn Business Computer, a series of microcomputers announced at the end of 1983 by the British company Acorn Computers
- Atanasoff–Berry computer, an early electronic digital computer

==== Software ====
- ABC (computer virus), a memory-resident, file-infecting computer virus
- ABC (programming language), a programming language and environment
- ABC (stream cipher), an algorithm
- Abstract base class, a programming language concept
- Artificial bee colony algorithm, a search algorithm
- .abc, several file formats

=== Mathematics ===
- ABC formula, an expression that provides the solutions to a quadratic equation
- Absorbing boundary condition, a kind of technique for numerical analysis of outgoing waves
- Approximate Bayesian computation, a computational method in Bayesian statistics
- abc conjecture, a statement in number theory

=== Other science and technology ===
- ABC dry chemical, a fire extinguishing agent
- ABC weapon (atomic, biological, and chemical), a weapon of mass destruction
  - Atomic, biological, and chemical defense; now CBRN defense (chemical, biological, radiological, and nuclear)
- Accelerated bridge construction, a technique for building bridges
- Aerial bundled cable, for power lines
- Airborne Cigar, a British military electronic countermeasure system used during World War II

== Sports ==
- ABC Futebol Clube, a football (soccer) club based in Natal, Rio Grande do Norte, Brazil
- American Bowling Congress, merged in 2005 with other bowling organizations to form the US Bowling Congress
- Association of Boxing Commissions, a North American not-for-profit professional boxing and mixed martial arts organization
- Indianapolis ABCs, a 1900s Negro league baseball team

== Transportation ==
=== Aviation ===
- Advance Booking Charter, a type of air travel
- Albacete Airport, Spain (IATA code: ABC)

=== Cars ===
- Active Body Control, a type of automobile suspension technology
- ABC (1906 automobile), an American car by Albert Bledsoe Cole
- ABC (1920 automobile), an English car by ABC Motors
- ABC (1922 automobile), a planned American car

=== Railway ===
- Automatic Buffer Couplers, a type of railway couplers
- ABC Rail Guide, a British railway guide published between 1853 and 2007
- Altnabreac railway station, Scotland (National Rail code: ABC)

=== Other uses in transportation ===
- ABC Motors, an English manufacturer of aircraft, aero engines and cars
- Anglo Belgian Corporation, a diesel engine manufacturer
- ABC, a Finnish gas station chain owned by the ~~Group~~
- ABC motorcycles, a British motorcycle manufacturer

== Other uses ==
- Andrew Browne Cunningham, 1st Viscount Cunningham of Hyndhope (1883–1963), nicknamed ABC, a British WWII admiral
- Architectural, building and construction, an industry; see Industry Foundation Classes
- American-born Chinese, people of Chinese ethnicity born in the US
- Australian-born Chinese, people of Chinese ethnicity born in Australia
- Abecedarium, an inscription consisting of the letters of an alphabet
- Ambala Ayta language (ISO 639-3 code: abc)

== See also ==
- AB (disambiguation)
- ABCC (disambiguation)
- ABCD (disambiguation)
