= Abecedarian (disambiguation) =

Abecedarian is a 16th-century German sect that rejected any education above the minimal level.

Abecedarian may also refer to:

- A-b-c-darian, the youngest students in the typical one-room school of 19th-century America
- Abecedarian Early Intervention Project, a 1972 controlled experiment in North Carolina, US
- Abecedarians (band), an American post-punk trio active in the 1980s
- Abecedarian hymn, a hymn in which the first letter of every verse follows the order of the alphabet

== See also ==
- Abecedarium, an inscription of the letters of an alphabet in order
- Abecedarius, an acrostic with first letters in alphabetic order
- Alphabet (disambiguation)
- Alphabetical (disambiguation)
