= ABCD =

ABCD may refer to:

== Entertainment ==
=== Film ===
- ABCD (1999 film), an American film
- ABCD (film), a 2005 Indian Tamil-language romance
- ABCD: American Born Confused Desi (disambiguation)
- ABCD: Any Body Can Dance, a 2013 Indian Hindi-language dance-drama
  - ABCD 2, the 2015 sequel

=== Music ===
- "ABCD" (song), a 2024 South Korean song by Nayeon of Twice

== Science and technology ==
=== Medicine ===
- ABCD, a variation of ABC (medicine), a medical mnemonic
- ABCD guideline, used in diagnosis of melanoma
- ABCD rating, a staging system for prostate cancer
- ABCD syndrome, a genetic disorder
- Amphotericin B colloidal dispersion, an antifungal preparation

=== Other uses in science and technology ===
- ABCD Schema, a data exchange and access model in biology
- ABCD Study, the Adolescent Brain Cognitive Development longitudinal study
- ABCD matrix analysis, or ray transfer matrix analysis
- ABCD-parameters, in a two-port network
- ABCd, an American TV streaming service and sub-brand made by the American Broadcasting Corporation
- ABCD (add, browse, change, delete) a variation of create, read, update and delete in computer programming

== Other uses ==
- ABCD line, embargoes placed against the Japanese Empire by the Americans, British, Chinese and Dutch
- ABCD Region, an industrial district outside of São Paulo, Brazil
- ABCD ships (Atlanta, Boston, Chicago and Dolphin) of Delaware River Iron Ship Building and Engine Works
- Action for Boston Community Development, an American organization
- American-born confused desi, informal term for South Asian Americans
- Asset-based community development, a methodology for the sustainable development of communities
- Association of Better Computer Dealers, now CompTIA
- "ABCD" companies that dominate world agricultural commodity trading: Archer-Daniels-Midland, Bunge, Cargill, Louis Dreyfus

== See also ==
- ABC (disambiguation)
- ABCD1, a protein
- ABCD^{2} score, a score for determining the risk of stroke after a transient ischemic attack
- English alphabet
