= Alphabeta =

Alphabeta or Alpha Beta may also refer to:

- Alpha Beta, a former chain of Californian supermarkets
- The Greek alphabet, from Alpha (Αα) and Beta (Ββ), the first two letters
- Alpha and beta anomers (chemistry)
- Alpha–beta pruning, a type of search algorithm
- Alpha–beta transformation, a mathematical transformation in electrical engineering
- α,β-Unsaturated carbonyl compound, a class of organic compounds
- Alpha beta filter, a predictive filter
- Alpha (finance) and Beta (finance), two measures characterizing the return of an investment portfolio
- The Alpha Betas, a fraternity in the Revenge of the Nerds film series
- Alpha Betas, an animated webseries created by Chris Bruno and David Howard Lee starring Evan Fong
- α/β barrel, a protein fold structure
- Izhar Cohen and the Alphabeta, musical group known for the 1978 song "A-Ba-Ni-Bi"

== See also ==
- Alphabet (disambiguation)
