= ABC song =

ABC song or similar terms may refer to:

- The ABC Song, or Alphabet song, a popular alphabet song for children first copyrighted in 1835
- "ABC" (The Jackson 5 song), 1970
- "ABCs" (song), a 2008 song by K'naan
- "ABC-123", a 1993 song by LeVert
- "ABCDEFU", the 2021 debut song by Gayle also known by the radio-edit titles of "abc" and "abc (nicer)"
- "ABC", a song by Jin from the album ABC
- "ABC", a song by the Pipettes from the album We Are the Pipettes, 2006
- "ABC", a 1986 song by Anna Book
- "A.B.C.", a song by Ozuna from the album Cosmo, 2023
- "ABCDEath", a song by Psychostick from the album We Couldn't Think of a Title
- "ABC 123", a song by Mel B from the album Hot, 2000
- "ABC–DEF–GHI", a 1969 song sung by Big Bird on the American public television children's show Sesame Street

== See also ==
- ABC discography, list of songs by English band ABC
- Alphabet (disambiguation)
- ABC (disambiguation)
