= ABCDEF =

ABCDEF may refer to:

- ABCDEF, a modification of the ABC medical mnemonic
- American Boys' Club for the Defense of Errol Flynn

== See also ==
- ABCDEFG (disambiguation)
- "ABCDEFU", a 2021 single by Gayle
