= ABC station =

ABC station(s) may refer to:

- Television stations affiliated with the American Broadcasting Company:
  - List of ABC television affiliates (by U.S. state)
  - List of ABC television affiliates (table)
  - ABC Owned Television Stations
- ABC (Australian TV channel), the flagship TV channel of the Australian Broadcasting Corporation

== See also ==
- ABC (disambiguation)
