= ABC (1922 automobile) =

Defunct American motor vehicle manufacturer

Arthur-Boynton Company
- Industry: Automobile
- Founded: 1922
- Defunct: 1922
- Fate: Never materialized
- Headquarters: Albany, New York, United States
- Products: Automobiles

The ABC was a light car which was planned, in 1922, to sell for $300, but which never went into production.

== See also ==
- ABC (1906 automobile).
- List of defunct automobile manufacturers
