= Boulton Paul Overstrand =

1933 medium bomber aircraft

Overstrand
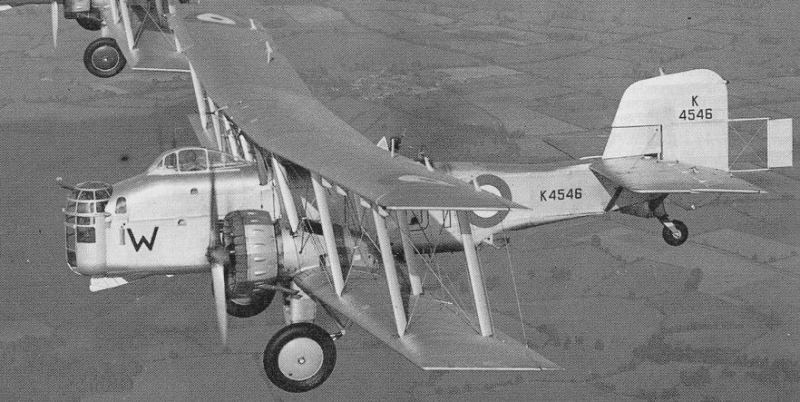
- Overstrand in flight

General information
- Type: Bomber
- Manufacturer: Boulton Paul
- Designer: H.A. Hughes
- Primary user: Royal Air Force
- Number built: 28 (four converted Sidestrands)

History
- Introduction date: 1934
- First flight: 1933
- Retired: 1941
- Developed from: Boulton Paul Sidestrand

The Boulton Paul P.75 Overstrand was a twin-engine biplane medium bomber designed and produced by the British aircraft manufacturer Boulton Paul. It was the final example of a series of biplane medium bombers that had served in the Royal Air Force since the First World War, starting with the likes of the Vickers Vimy and Handley Page Type O. The Overstrand was also the first aircraft to be fitted with a fully-enclosed power-operated turret.

First flown in 1933, the Overstrand was essentially an improved model of the Boulton Paul Sidestrand of the 1920s, thus early references to the type referred to it as the Sidestrand Mk IV instead. It demonstrated a higher maximum speed than its predecessor and was procured for the RAF in limited numbers. As such, the type entered service during the mid 1930s, but became increasingly overshadowed by the new generation of monoplane medium bombers, such as the Vickers Wellington and Armstrong Whitworth Whitley. Nevertheless, the Overstrand remained operational during the early years of the Second World War, albeit only being flown by training units. The few surviving aircraft were withdrawn from service during 1941, having been rendered surplus to requirements.

== Design and development ==
=== Origins ===
The Overstrand was a development of the Boulton Paul Sidestrand, which had first flown in 1928 and like the Sidestrand, it was named after a village in Norfolk, home also of Boulton Paul's Norwich factory. The earlier Sidestrand had been largely similar to its predecessors of the First World War, featuring open cockpits and hand-operated defensive machine guns. Unlike its predecessors, the Sidestrand could fly at speed of up to 140 mph (230 km/h), which made operating the guns in exposed positions difficult, particularly in the nose. To address this difficulty, the Overstrand was furnished with an alternative nose turret design, which was both enclosed and powered. At the time this was a relatively novel feature, the resulting aircraft being the first in the world to feature a fully-enclosed power-operated turret.

The Overstrand's innovative turret was largely developed in-house by Bolton Paul's chief armament designer H. A. Hughes. In terms of its basic design, the turret was a metal-framed cylinder with a domed upper and lower area; Perspex was used as glazing, in which there was a vertical slot for the single Lewis gun, which was covered by a canvas strip with a zip fastener to facilitate movement of the gun itself. Traverse motion of the turret was driven by pneumatic motors, powered by air bottles on board that were pressurised to 200 psi (1,400,000 Pa) using an engine-driven air compressor. The turret could move through a fully 360-degree circle if the gun was raised sufficiently, helping the turret to cover the widest area of any turret system. A geared spindle at the base of the turret was supported by a series of ball bearings. Elevation was achieved manually.

In addition to the turret, various other revisions and improvements were also incorporated. It was decided that the cockpit ought to also be fully enclosed within a canopy of anti-glare Perspex, complete with a sliding hood. The airframe was strengthened considerably in many areas, which facilitated an increased bomb capacity of up to 1,500 lb (680 kg), up to two 500 lb (230 kg) bombs could be carried in the aircraft's recessed bomb cell in addition to two 250 lb (110 kg) bombs on external carriers. A new levered main undercarriage, complete with larger wheels, was also fitted, while the tailskid of the Sidestrand was replaced by a tailwheel. The wing design was also revised, a noticeable sweepback was added to the outer sections in order to compensate for the aircraft's heavier nose section.

=== Into flight ===
During 1933, the first Overstrand performed its maiden flight, at which point the type was still known as the Sidestrand Mk IV. Shortly thereafter, it was decided to rename the aircraft after the village of Overstrand. On 22 February 1934, the prototype was delivered to RAF Andover for trials conducted by No. 101 Squadron. Some criticisms of the aircraft were produced during this time, one early report by the Aeroplane and Armament Experimental Establishment (A&AEE) observed the powered turret to be somewhat cramped, while excessive engine vibration and issues with the longitudinal controls were also noted. Various positive attributes were also noted, such the addition of crew comfort features, as well as the aircraft's ability to attain speeds as high as 153 mph (246 km/h) at an altitude of 6,500 ft (2,000 m) without any negative impact upon its manoeuvrability.

Modifications were made after the aircraft's return on 19 March to refine the design. This led to a second Sidestrand being converted to the Overstrand configuration, incorporating these improvements, such as larger diameter turret, tweaks to the fins and elevators, and a simplification of the rear engine mount area. While the initial example had been powered by a pair of Bristol Pegasus IM.3 radial engines, each capable of generating up to 580 hp (430 kW), in comparison to the 460 hp (340 kW) provided by the Bristol Jupiters used upon the Sidestrand, the second aircraft was outfitted with the improved Bristol Pegasus II.M3 engine, capable of 580 hp (430 kW), instead.

Continued flight testing revealed the vibration issues to be present still, but would be largely resolved upon later new-build Overstrands. Having been encouraged by the demonstrated performance, which displayed a meaningful improvement over the Sidestrand, the Air Ministry authorised the modification of a further two Sidestrands into Overstrands. Shortly thereafter, the Ministry selected the type to fulfil Specification 23/34 and issued an initial order for 19 Overstrands. A small follow-on order for five new-built Overstrands would lead to a total of 24 aircraft being built in addition to the four converted Sidestrands.

At one stage, plans were drawn up for an improved variant of the aircraft to be developed, the principal difference being the adoption of a retractable undercarriage, designated the P.80 "Superstrand"; however, this project was ultimately abandoned due to alternative options involving rival monoplane designs proving to be more attractive in the eyes of military planners.

== Operational history ==
A total of 24 Overstrands would be procured for the RAF, a quantity that facilitated the complete replacement of the older Sidestrands flown by No. 101 Squadron, the only squadron equipped with the type, to commence in January 1935. The type was also briefly adopted by No. 144 Squadron, although it was quickly replaced by the more modern Bristol Blenheim bomber during 1938. The Overstrand proved to be relatively popular with its crews, who often appreciated the attention paid to crew comfort as well as the ability of the newly developed powered turret.

While aerial refuelling was still a somewhat experimental capability during the late 1930s, it is known that at least one Overstrand was modified to receive fuel from a Vickers Virginia tanker aircraft. The type would perform regular public displays of its capabilities, from mock interceptions to bombing demonstrations, throughout the 1930s; one particularly prominent occasion was during the Silver Jubilee of George V, with the King himself inspecting one such aircraft externally and internally. During 1935, an Overstrand of No. 101 Squadron was awarded to Sassoon Trophy for aerial reconnaissance, having the highest score achieved at that time.

Due to the rapid advances made in bomber technology during the late 1930s, the Overstrand had been effectively rendered obsolete by 1938, the final example of the type being withdrawn from frontline duties during the summer of that same year. The surviving Overstrands were allocated to the Armament Training Camps during 1938. At the outbreak of the Second World War, eleven Overstrands remained in service and six were used for gunnery training. They remained in operation until May 1941, though flying was limited following the fatal mid-air breakup of Overstrand K8173 on 22 April 1940.

== Aircraft on display ==
A replica of an Overstrand nose section, marked as K4556, is on display at the Norfolk and Suffolk Aviation Museum.

== Operators ==
United Kingdom

- Royal Air Force
  - No. 101 Squadron
  - No. 144 Squadron
- RAF Second line units
  - No. 2 Air Observers School
  - No. 10 Bombing and Gunnery School
  - Balloon Development Unit
  - Army Co-operation Development Unit

== Accidents and incidents ==
A number of Overstrands were destroyed or beyond economic repair in accidents, the type had only two fatal accidents.

- 11 January 1937: K4564 of 101 Squadron flew into ground in fog at Swanbourne, Buckinghamshire, three crew killed.
- 22 April 1940: K8173 of 101 Squadron crashed off Chesil Beach, Dorset following an engine fire, three crew killed.

== Specifications ==
Data from The British Bomber since 1914.

General characteristics

- Crew: five
- Length: 46 ft 0 in (14.02 m)
- Wingspan: 72 ft 0 in (21.95 m)
- Height: 15 ft 6 in (4.72 m)
- Wing area: 980 sq ft (91 m^{2})
- Empty weight: 7,936 lb (3,600 kg)
- Gross weight: 11,932 lb (5,412 kg)
- Powerplant: 2 × Bristol Pegasus IIM.3 nine-cylinder radial engines, 580 hp (430 kW) each

Performance

- Maximum speed: 148 mph (238 km/h, 129 kn) at 6,500 ft (2,000 m)
- Range: 545 mi (877 km, 474 nmi)
- Service ceiling: 21,300 ft (6,500 m)
- Time to altitude: Five minutes and 24 seconds to 6,500 ft (2,000 m)

Armament

- Guns: Three .303 in (7.7 mm) Lewis guns in nose turret, dorsal and ventral gun positions
- Bombs: 1,500 lb (680 kg) bombs (two 500 lb/227 kg and two 250 lb/113 kg) and four 20 lb (9 kg) bombs could be carried on fuselage racks by the cockpit and dorsal gun position

== See also ==
Related development

- Boulton Paul Sidestrand

Aircraft of comparable role, configuration, and era

- Martin B-10, contemporary American all-metal monoplane bomber with nose turret
- Breguet 410

Related lists

- List of bomber aircraft
