= No. 101 Squadron RAF =

Flying squadron of the Royal Air Force

- Squadron badge
- Active: 12 Jul 1917 – 31 Dec 1919; 21 Mar 1928 – 1 Feb 1957; 15 Oct 1957 – 4 Aug 1982; 1 May 1984 – present
- Country: United Kingdom
- Branch: Royal Air Force
- Type: Flying squadron
- Role: Air transport and air-to-air refuelling
- Part of: No. 1 Group RAF
- Home station: RAF Brize Norton
- Mottos: Mens agitat molem (Latin for 'Mind over matter')
- Aircraft: Airbus A330 Voyager K2/K3
- Battle honours: Western Front 1917–1918*; Ypres (1917)*; Somme (1918); Lys; Hindenburg Line; Fortress Europe (1940–1944)*; Invasion Ports (1940)*; Ruhr (1940–1945)*; Berlin (1941)*; Channel and North Sea (1941–1944); Biscay Ports (1941–1944); German Ports (1941–1945); Baltic (1942–1945); Berlin (1943–1944); France and Germany (1944–1945); Normandy (1944)*; Walcheren; South Atlantic (1982); Gulf (1991); Kosovo; Iraq (2003–2011); Libya (2011); * Honours marked with an asterisk may be emblazoned on the Squadron Standard

Commanders
- Current commander: Wg Cdr Paul Summers

Insignia
- Squadron badge heraldry: Issuant from the battlements of a tower, a demi lion rampant guardant. The battlements symbolise the squadron's pioneering role in the development of power-operated gun turrets, while the lion indicates the unit's fighting power and spirit. Approved by King George VI in February 1938
- Squadron codes: LU (Apr 1939 - Sep 1939); SR (Sep 1939 - Apr 1951); MW ('C' Flight - May 1942)

No. 101 Squadron of the Royal Air Force operates the Airbus Voyager in the air-to-air refuelling and transport roles from RAF Brize Norton, Oxfordshire.

== History ==
=== Formation and early years ===
101 Squadron RFC was formed at Farnborough on 12 July 1917 operating the Royal Aircraft Factory FE2b. Two weeks later it moved to France to operate as a night bomber squadron. In March 1919 the squadron returned to the UK and it was disbanded on 31 December 1919.

=== Reformation and World War II ===
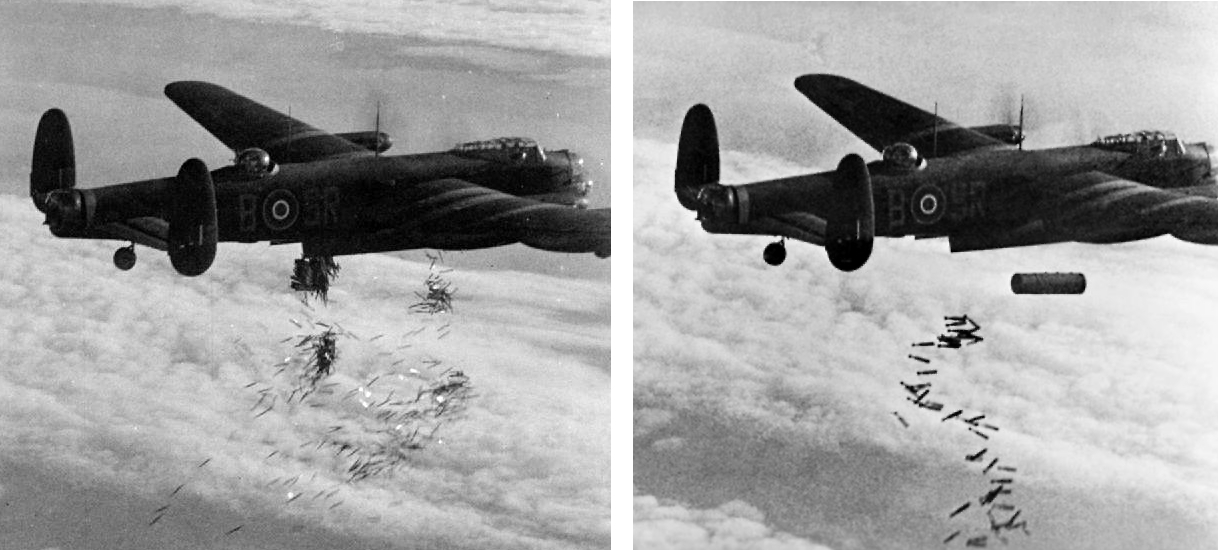
An Airborne Cigar (ABC) Lancaster I of No. 101 Squadron dropping bombs over Duisburg, 1944

The squadron was reformed in March 1928 at RAF Bircham Newton as a day bomber squadron flying the Boulton Paul Sidestrand. In 1938 the squadron was equipped with the Bristol Blenheim. In 1941 the squadron changed to a medium-bomber squadron with the Vickers Wellington. These were replaced the following year with the Avro Lancaster. 101 Squadron Lancasters were in 1943 equipped with a top secret radio jamming system codenamed "Airborne Cigar" (ABC) operated by an eighth crew member who could understand German, some with German or Jewish backgrounds known as "special operators" commonly abbreviated to "spec ops" or "SO". They sat in a curtained off area towards the rear of the aircraft and located and jammed German fighter controller's broadcasts, occasionally posing as controllers to spread disinformation. The aircraft fitted with the system were distinctive due to the two large vertical antennae rising from the middle of the fuselage. Deliberately breaking the standing operating procedure of radio silence to conduct the jamming made the aircraft highly vulnerable to being tracked and attacked, which resulted in 101 Squadron having the highest casualty rate of any RAF squadron.

=== Post-war ===
In October 1945, the squadron moved to RAF Binbrook, Lincolnshire and in June 1946 re-equipped with Avro Lincolns. These aircraft were deployed in conducting small-scale raids against the Quteibi tribe at Thumier in Aden in October 1947.

On 25 May 1950, the squadron took delivery of its first English Electric Canberra B2 thereby becoming the RAF's first jet bomber unit. Without a training unit in existence, conversion to type was achieved by the squadron itself with assistance from English Electric test pilots. Most of the type's service trials were flown by the squadron and, by the end of 1950, nine Canberra B2s were held on strength. Out of the pool of type-qualified crews, a wing of five squadrons had been formed by August 1952 at Binbrook, comprising Nos. 9, 12, 50, 101 and 617.

In June 1954, the squadron became the first to receive the B.6 variant of the Canberra. After full conversion to the type, the Binbrook Wing of five squadrons undertook an intensive training programme in readiness for staged detachments to Malaya as support for Operation Firedog. This was a large-scale counter-insurgency campaign, on-going in Malaya since 1948 against communist guerrillas. 101 Squadron became the first RAF jet bomber squadron to serve in the Far East when four Canberras arrived at Changi on 11 February 1955. The first bomb drop by an RAF jet bomber occurred when the squadron, which had been deployed to RAF Butterworth, Penang, was operating against a target in Johore. Over a period of two months operating from Butterworth, ninety-eight raids were made before the squadron returned to Binbrook on 21 June 1955. A final deployment to the same base from June to August 1956 signified the last Canberra participation in the Malayan operation. Also in 1956, the squadron flew night bombing raids against Egyptian airfields from their base at Hal Far, Malta during the Suez crisis. With the entry into service of the V bombers, Canberras in the bomber role were becoming outmoded. Consequently, 101 Squadron was temporarily disbanded on 1 February 1957.

=== Vulcans ===
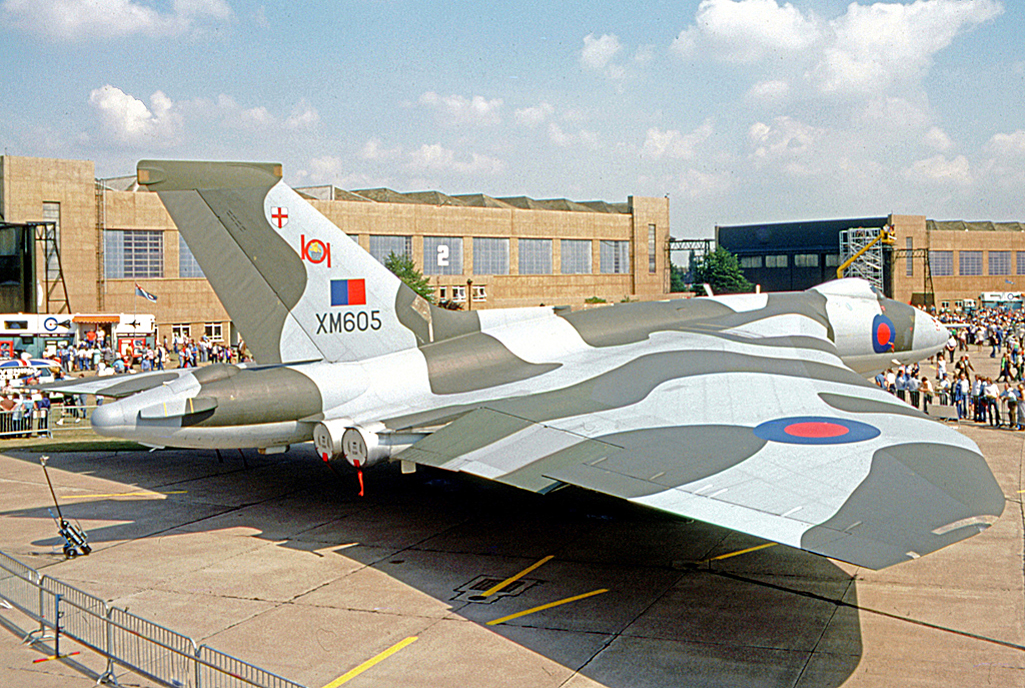
101 Squadron Vulcan B.2 of the RAF Waddington Wing in 1972

The squadron reformed on 15 October 1957 as part of RAF Bomber Command's V bomber force maintaining the UK's strategic nuclear deterrent, equipped with Avro Vulcan B1s from RAF Finningley, and in 1961 the squadron moved from Finningley to RAF Waddington where it remained until disbandment in 1982. Its aircraft were now the upgraded Vulcan B1A fitted with the ECM tailpod. The squadron's assigned role was high-level strategic bombing with a variety of free fall nuclear bombs. These included American bombs supplied to the RAF under Project E.

On 20 June 1961 a 101 Squadron Vulcan B1A (XH481) flew non-stop from RAF Waddington to the Royal Australian Air Force Base Richmond, NSW, the longest recorded non-stop flight by a Vulcan, and the 10,000 nmi flight still stands as a record for the Vulcan, exceeding the mileage done by the Black Buck Vulcan by some 3,000 nmi.

After the advent of effective Soviet SAMs forced Bomber Command to reassign V bombers from high-altitude operations to low-level penetration operations in March 1963, the squadron's Vulcans adopted a mission profile that included a 'pop-up' manoeuvre from 500 to 1,000 ft to above 12,000 ft for safe release of Yellow Sun Mk2.

By Dec 1967 the squadron was re-equipped with eight Vulcan B2 aircraft and eight WE.177B laydown bombs which improved aircraft survivability by enabling aircraft to remain at low-level during weapon release.

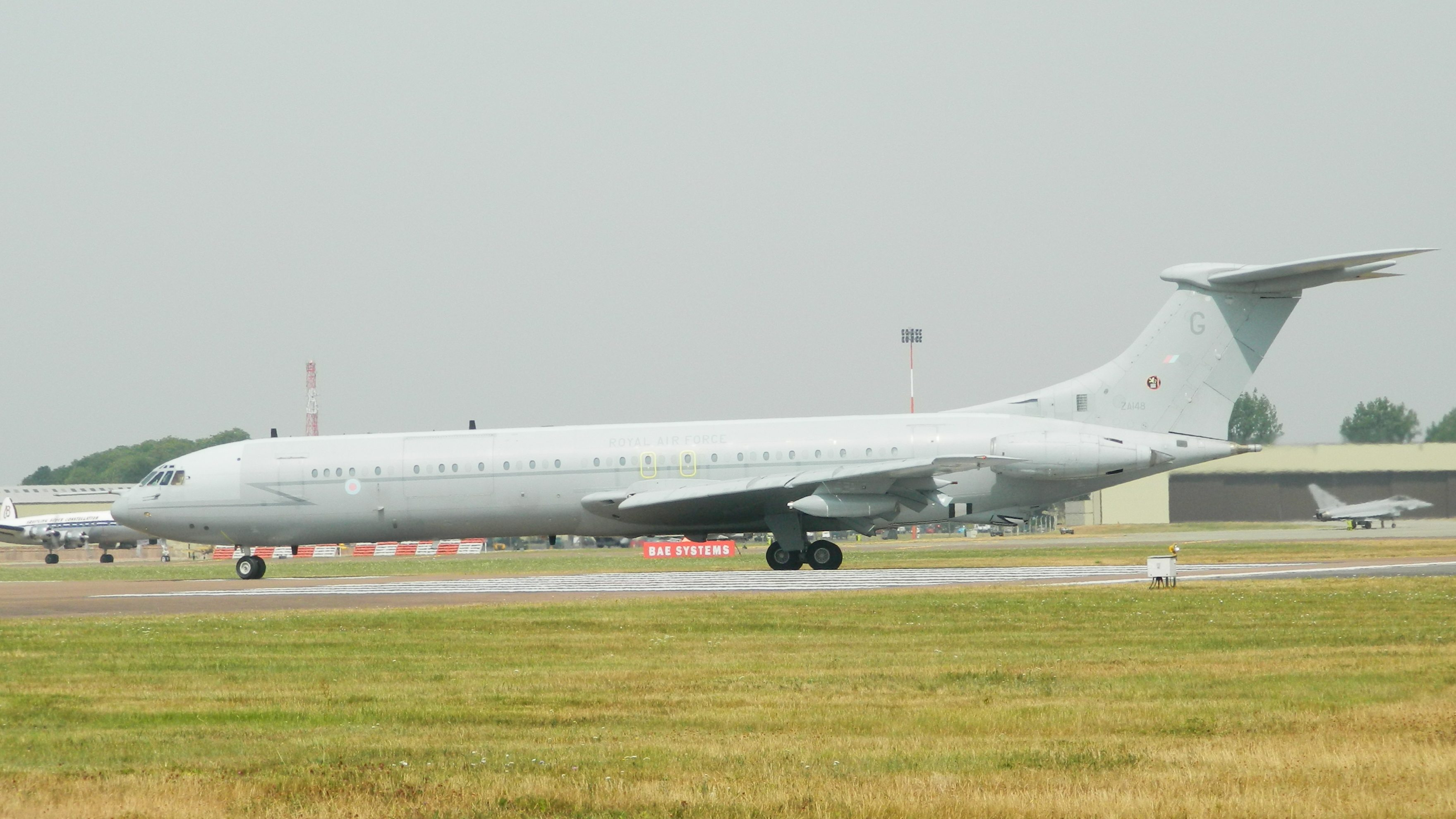
A VC10 K3 in 2013 the last year of operation.

Following the transfer of responsibility for the nuclear deterrent to the Royal Navy the squadron was reassigned to SACEUR for tactical strike missions still armed with the WE.177B bomb and a variety of conventional munitions. In a high-intensity European war the squadron's new role was to support land forces on the Continent resisting an assault on Western Europe by the Red Army, by striking deep into enemy-held areas beyond the forward edge of the battlefield, striking at enemy concentrations and infrastructure, first with conventional weapons and secondly with WE.177 tactical nuclear weapons as required, should a conflict escalate to that stage. The squadron continued in this role until the Falklands War of 1982 when the squadron performed operations during the campaign in the South Atlantic, and was then disbanded on 4 August 1982.

=== Tankers ===
In 1978, the RAF announced a plan to convert second-hand civil Vickers VC10 aircraft for conversion to aerial refuelling aircraft and the first K2 flew in 1982. No 101 Squadron was chosen to operate the aircraft and was reformed at RAF Brize Norton on 1 May 1984. Notable recent deployments of 101 Squadron include the Gulf War and the 2003 invasion of Iraq. The VC10 aircraft was retired on 20 September 2013, and was replaced by the Airbus Voyager.

== Aircraft operated ==
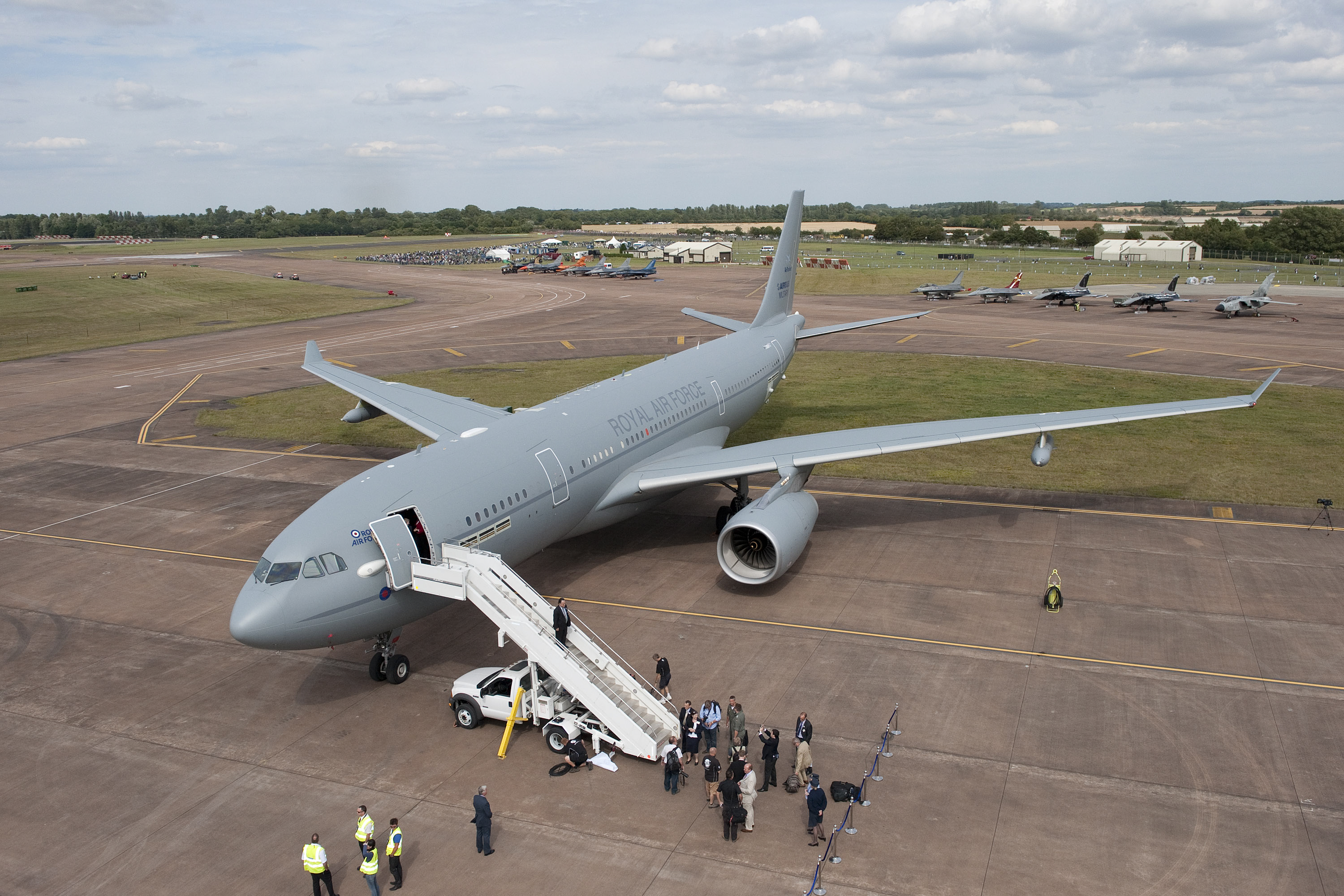
Airbus Voyager

data from
From	To	Aircraft	Version
July 1917	March 1918	Royal Aircraft Factory B.E.12	BE.12
July 1917	March 1918	Royal Aircraft Factory B.E.12	BE.12a
July 1917	March 1919	Royal Aircraft Factory F.E.2	FE.2b and FE.2d
April 1928	July 1936	Boulton Paul Sidestrand	Mk.III
November 1928	June 1929	de Havilland DH.9A	
January 1935	August 1938	Boulton Paul Overstrand	Mk.I (four converted from Sidestrands)
June 1938	April 1939	Bristol Blenheim	Mk.I
April 1939	May 1941	Bristol Blenheim IV	Mk.IV
April 1941	February 1942	Vickers Wellington	Mk.Ic
February 1942	October 1942	Vickers Wellington	Mk.III
October 1942	August 1946	Avro Lancaster	Mk.I & Mk.III
August 1946	June 1951	Avro Lincoln	B.2
June 1951	August 1954	English Electric Canberra	B.2
June 1954	January 1957	English Electric Canberra	B.6
October 1957	May 1962	Avro Vulcan	B.1
March 1961	December 1967	Avro Vulcan	B.1a
December 1967	August 1982	Avro Vulcan	B.2
February 1984	March 2001	Vickers VC10	K2
February 1985	September 2013	Vickers VC10	K3
July 1994	March 2013	Vickers VC10	K4
October 2005	July 2013	Vickers VC10	C1K
October 2013	present	Airbus Voyager	KC2 and KC3

== See also ==
- List of Royal Air Force aircraft squadrons
