= Boulton Paul Sidestrand =

Military aircraft of the Royal Air Force

Sidestrand
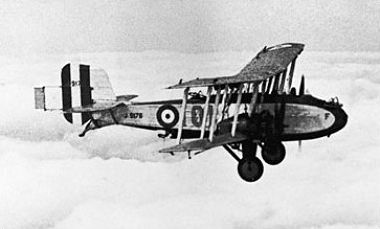

General information
- Type: Medium bomber
- Manufacturer: Boulton Paul
- Designer: John Dudley North
- Primary user: Royal Air Force
- Number built: 20 (four Sidestrands were converted into the Boulton Paul Overstrand)

History
- Introduction date: 1928
- First flight: 1926
- Retired: 1936
- Variant: Boulton Paul Overstrand

The Boulton Paul P.29 Sidestrand was a twin-engine biplane medium bomber of the Royal Air Force. Designed for daylight operations, it was manoeuvrable and provided with three defensive gun positions. Named after a village on the Norfolk coast near Boulton & Paul's factory in Norwich, the Sidestrand first flew in 1926 and entered service in 1928. It remained in service until 1936, equipping No. 101 Squadron RAF. It was an agile and relatively fast aircraft that was capable of aerobatic manoeuvres such as loops, rolls and spins.

== Design and development ==
Boulton & Paul Ltd of Norwich built a series of twin-engined biplanes starting with the Bourges of 1918, which although not ordered into production, had demonstrated excellent performance and manoeuvrability, followed by the 'all-metal' Bolton of 1922 and the smaller Bugle of 1923. In 1924, the Air Ministry issued Specification 9/24 for an all-metal, twin-engined medium bomber, and Boulton & Paul's offering, designed by John Dudley North, led to an order for two prototypes early in 1925. The first aircraft flew in 1926, piloted by Squadron Leader Cecil Rea, the company's first full-time test pilot.

The village of Sidestrand, chosen for the aircraft name, was the home of the Secretary of State for Air, Samuel Hoare. Only 20 Sidestrands were built. The first two were similar prototypes, designated the Sidestrand Mk I. Originally intended to be powered by two Napier Lion inline engines, the Mk I was eventually fitted with 425 hp (317 kW) Bristol Jupiter VI radial engines, which also powered the first six production Sidestrands, known as the Sidestrand Mk II. The remaining twelve aircraft were powered by 460 hp (343 kW) Jupiter VIIIFs as the Sidestrand Mk III. The six Mk IIs were subsequently re-engined to bring them up to the Mk III specification.

Building on Boulton & Paul's experience with the Bourges, Bolton and Bugle, the airframe was carefully designed with the help of a wind tunnel to keep drag to a minimum. The fuselage was constructed from steel tube with a fabric and plywood covering. Aluminium alloys were used for elements bearing lower structural loads, such as the outer interplane struts and wing ribs. Bombs were carried internally in open bays set into the fuselage. A small compartment under the cockpit enabled the bomb-aimer to lie prone when using his sight, and also housed the radio. The undercarriage had oleo suspension legs and a tailskid. Unusually, the engine mountings were hinged for ease of maintenance, and the nose also hinged allowing access to the back of the cockpit instrument panel and to the radio compartment. Production models incorporated a prominent Servo tab on the rudder and Frise ailerons to reduce pilot control loads. The elevators horns remained unchanged in production models from the Mk I, but the vertical fin became less angular. Automatic sprung leading-edge slats were added to the top planes to reduce stalling speed. The Mk III introduced a bomb-aiming window into the nose. Four-bladed propellers replaced two-bladed from March 1930.

The Sidestrand usually had a crew of three: pilot, nose gunner/bomb aimer and a rear gunner. Additionally, a navigator/co-pilot could be accommodated in a small cockpit immediately aft of the pilot's. There were three open gun positions; nose, dorsal and ventral. Armament for each position was a .303 in (7.7 mm) Lewis gun, the weapon being moved between the two rear positions depending on where each aircraft flew in a formation. The bomb-load was limited to 1,050 pounds (480 kg), less than contemporaries such as the Tupolev TB-1.

In the early 1930s a Sidestrand Mk III was fitted with Bristol Pegasus IM3 engines. This was intended to become the Sidestrand Mk IV, but eventually became the prototype for the redeveloped Boulton Paul Overstrand which would begin replacing the Sidestrand in service in 1936. Four Sidestrands were eventually converted to Overstrand standard and are essentially considered Overstrands.

== Operational history ==
Deliveries to the re-formed No. 101 Squadron began in 1928 at RAF Bircham Newton. The two Mk Is were joined initially by six Mk IIs with un-geared Bristol Jupiter VI engines. These were followed by nine Mk III variants with geared Jupiter VIIIFs and the final three production aircraft were replacement Mk IIs. The squadron moved to RAF Andover in 1929 and to RAF Bicester in 1934.

The Sidestrand inherited the good manoeuvrability of the Boulton Paul P. 7 Bourges, and put on a notably impressive display at the 1932 RAF Pageant. But despite proving to be an excellent aircraft for bombing and gunnery, only No. 101 Squadron was so equipped.

As part of its peacetime round of training duties, the Squadron undertook mock combat exercises with fighter squadrons and participated in the annual bombing competition (usually held at RAF Catfoss). After a mock combat exercise in the summer of 1930 with Armstrong Whitworth Siskin fighters of No. 111 Squadron, it was noted in the No. 101 Squadron operations record book that, "the Sidestrand [in formation] was a difficult proposition to tackle and that Fighters had no attack at present to meet them."

The Squadron also experimented with 'glide bombing' (possibly dive bombing) in January 1932, and during 1934 the Sidestrand showed itself capable of intensive night flying.

Even with Jupiter VI engines, the aircraft could retain height on only one engine, turn in either direction and climb slowly (without bomb load).

The maximum endurance was found to be 6 hours with a 1/2 hour reserve.

The Sidestrand never equipped any other squadrons and 101 Squadron remained essentially an experimental unit used by the RAF to test the medium day bomber concept.

== Variants ==
Sidestrand I
Two prototypes.
Sidestrand II
Production variant, six built and converted to Sidestrand III.
Sidestrand III
Improved production variant, twelve built, four converted to Boulton Paul Overstrands.
Sidestrand V
Improved variant modified from a Mark III with more powerful engines, an enclosed cockpit and nose-mounted power-operated turret, renamed Boulton Paul Overstrand

== Operators ==
United Kingdom

- Royal Air Force
  - No. 101 Squadron RAF

== Specifications (Mk III - performance with bomb load) ==
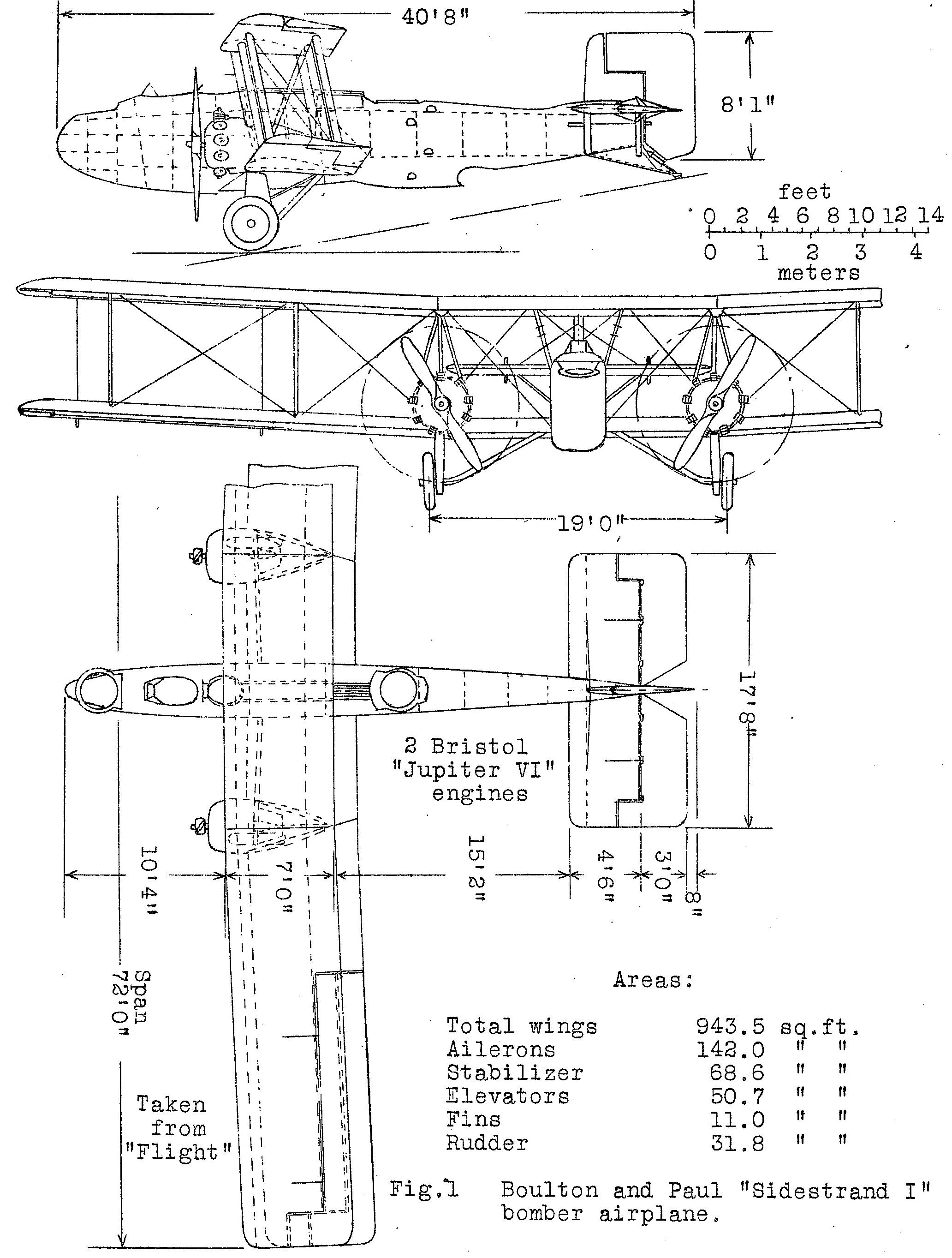
Boulton Paul Sidestrand 3-view drawing from NACA Aircraft Circular No.71

Data from The British Bomber since 1914.

General characteristics

- Crew: three or four (pilot, two gunners and optional navigator/co-pilot)
- Length: 46 ft 0 in (14.02 m)
- Wingspan: 71 ft 11 in (21.92 m)
- Height: 14 ft 9 1/2 in (4.51 m)
- Wing area: 979.5 sq ft (91.00 m^{2})
- Empty weight: 6,370 lb (2,889 kg)
- Gross weight: 10,200 lb (4,627 kg)
- Powerplant: 2 × Bristol Jupiter VIIIF 9-cylinder air-cooled radial engines, 460 hp (340 kW) each

Performance

- Maximum speed: 139 mph (224 km/h, 121 kn) at 6,500 ft (2,000 m)
- Range: 520 mi (840 km, 450 nmi)
- Service ceiling: 20,800 ft (6,300 m)
- Time to altitude: 6 min 42 s to 6,500 ft (2,000 m)

Armament

- Guns: 2 × .303 in (7.7 mm) Lewis guns. One in nose, other in either dorsal and ventral gun positions
- Bombs: 1,040 lb (473 kg) total

== See also ==
Related development

- Boulton Paul Overstrand

Related lists

- List of bomber aircraft
