= Taxon =

Unit of biological populations

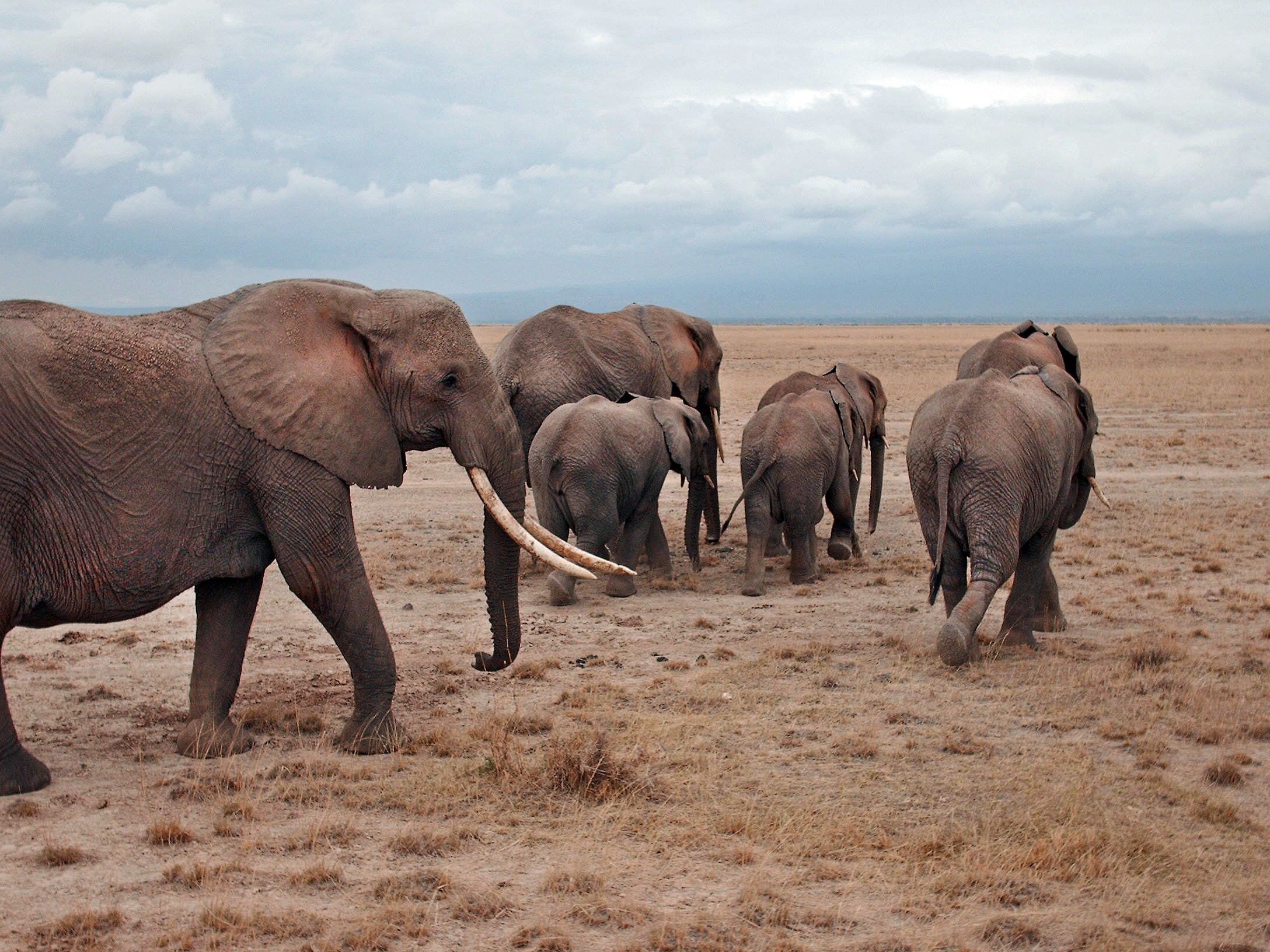
African elephants form the genus Loxodonta, a widely accepted taxon.

In biology, a taxon is a group of one or more populations of an organism, or organisms, as seen by taxonomists to form a biological unit; (taxon: back-formation from taxonomy; pl.: taxa). Although neither is required, a taxon, once its description has become established, is usually known by a particular name and is given a particular ranking.

== Methods ==
Taxonomists consider:

- which organisms belong to a given taxon
- which criteria are to be used for deciding inclusion. This is especially the case in context of rank-based nomenclature (Linnaean taxonomy).

Once a taxon is given a formal scientific name, its use is governed by one of the nomenclature codes that specify the correct scientific name for a particular grouping.

Initial attempts at preserving human knowledge of plants and animals were presumably made in prehistoric times by hunter-gatherers, as suggested by folk taxonomies interpreted from archeological and anthropological studies. Much later, as of Aristotle's teachings, and later still—as of the published works of Magnol, Tournefort, and Carl Linnaeus, (his Systema Naturae, 10th edition (1758)), and as of the unpublished works of Bernard and Antoine Laurent de Jussieu—then did European naturalists and scientists begin documenting this new field of human knowledge.

The idea of a unit-based system to classify the characteristics of plants and animals (later known as biological classification) was first made widely available in 1805 via Augustin Pyramus de Candolle's Principes élémentaires de botanique, published as the introduction to Jean-Baptiste Lamarck's Flore françoise, 3rd ed. (1805), which treatise presented a system for the "natural classification" of plants. From that time forward systematists have competed, collaborated, and published—while providing for organizing and classifying human knowledge of the life forms on planet Earth.

In modern biology studies, a "good" or "useful" taxon is commonly taken to be one that reflects evolutionary relationships. (Note: This is not considered as mandatory, however, as indicated by terms for non-monophyletic groupings ("invertebrates", "conifers", "fish", etc).) Many modern systematists are advocates of phylogenetic nomenclature; they use cladistic methods that require taxa to be monophyletic (i.e., show all the descendants of a common ancestor). Their basic unit, the clade, is equivalent to the taxon, and their using the clade implies that taxa should reflect evolutionary relationships. Similarly, among those contemporary taxonomists working with the traditional Linnean (binomial) nomenclature, only a few still propose taxa they know to be paraphyletic.

An example of a long-established taxon that is paraphyletic—meaning not also a clade—is the class Reptilia: the reptiles. Birds and mammals are descendants of animals long classed as reptiles; but traditionally, neither was placed in class Reptilia. Instead, birds are found in the class Aves, and mammals in the class Mammalia.

== History ==
The term taxon was first used in 1926 by Adolf Meyer-Abich for animal groups, as a back-formation from the word taxonomy; the word taxonomy had been coined a century before from the Greek components τάξις (táxis), meaning "arrangement", and νόμος (nómos), meaning "method". For plants, it was proposed by Herman Johannes Lam in 1948, and it was adopted at the VII International Botanical Congress, held in 1950.

== Definition ==
The glossary of the International Code of Zoological Nomenclature (1999) defines a:

- "taxon, (pl. taxa), n.

A taxonomic unit, whether named or not: i.e. a population, or group of populations of organisms which are usually inferred to be phylogenetically related and which have characters in common which differentiate (q.v.) the unit (e.g. a geographic population, a genus, a family, an order) from other such units. A taxon encompasses all included taxa of lower rank (q.v.) and individual organisms. [...]"

== Ranks ==
The hierarchy of biological classification's eight major taxonomic ranks. Intermediate minor rankings are not shown.

A taxon can be assigned a taxonomic rank, usually (but not necessarily) when it is given a formal description, though it is common to place a taxon as an unranked group called a clade.

"Phylum" applies formally to any biological domain, but traditionally it was always used for animals, whereas "division" was traditionally often used for plants, fungi, etc.

The prefix super- indicates a rank above, the prefix sub- indicates a rank below. In zoology, the prefix infra- indicates a rank below sub-. For instance, among the additional ranks of class are superclass, subclass and infraclass.

Rank is relative, and restricted to a particular systematic schema. For example, liverworts have been grouped, in various systems of classification, as a family, order, class, or division (phylum). The use of a narrow set of ranks is challenged by users of cladistics; for example, the mere 10 ranks traditionally used between animal families (governed by the International Code of Zoological Nomenclature [ICZN]) and animal phyla (usually the highest relevant rank in taxonomic work) often cannot adequately represent the evolutionary history as more about a lineage's phylogeny becomes known.

In addition, the class rank is quite often not an evolutionary but a phenetic or paraphyletic group and as opposed to those ranks governed by the ICZN (family-level, genus-level and species-level taxa), can usually not be made monophyletic by exchanging the taxa contained therein. This has given rise to phylogenetic taxonomy and the ongoing development of the PhyloCode, which has been proposed as a new alternative to replace Linnean classification and govern the application of names to clades. Many cladists do not see any need to depart from traditional nomenclature as governed by the ICZN, International Code of Nomenclature for algae, fungi, and plants, etc.

== See also ==
- ABCD Schema
- Alpha taxonomy
- Chresonym
- Cladistics
- Folk taxonomy
- Ichnotaxon
- International Code of Nomenclature for algae, fungi, and plants
- International Code of Nomenclature of Prokaryotes
- International Code of Phylogenetic Nomenclature
- International Code of Zoological Nomenclature (ICZN)
- List of taxa named by anagrams
- Rank (botany)
- Rank (zoology)
- Segregate (taxonomy)
- Virus classification
- Wastebasket taxon
