= ABCC =

ABCC may refer to:

- Alpha Beta Christian College, a secondary school in Ghana, founded 2004
- American Board of Clinical Chemistry, an American doctoral board certification agency, established 1950
- Angami Baptist Church Council, headquartered in India, formed c. 1885
- Arunachal Baptist Church Council, located in North East India
- Association of British Chambers of Commerce, since 1996 known as the British Chambers of Commerce
- Atomic Bomb Casualty Commission, a U.S. government agency, 1946–1975
- Australian Building and Construction Commission, an Australian Government agency, 2016–2023
  - Office of the Australian Building and Construction Commissioner, an Australian Government agency, 2005–2012
- Massachusetts Alcoholic Beverage Control Commission, an agency of the state government of Massachusetts

== See also ==
- ABC (disambiguation)
