= ABCD: American Born Confused Desi =

ABCD: American Born Confused Desi may refer to:

- American-born confused desi, slang term for Indian-Americans
- ABCD: American-Born Confused Desi (2013 film), a 2013 Indian Malayalam-language comedy film
- ABCD: American Born Confused Desi (2019 film), a 2019 Indian Telugu-language drama film by Sanjeev Reddy

== See also ==
- ABCD (disambiguation)
