= ABCDEFG =

ABCDEFG and Abcdefg may refer to:

== Music ==
- The standard names of the seven diatonic musical notes: "A", "B", "C", "D", "E", "F", and "G"
- ABCDEFG (album), a 2010 album by British band Chumbawamba
- "ABCDEFG", a 2013 single recorded by American singer Alison Gold
- "Abcdefg", a song by Rosalía from Motomami, 2022

== Technical ==
- ABCDEFG Schema, a Geosciences extension to the Access to Biological Collections Data (ABCD) XML schema

== See also ==
- English alphabet
- Balu: ABCDEFG, a 2005 Indian film
