= .abc =

.abc is the name of several file extensions:

- .abc (ActionScript), or ActionScript Byte Code, used in virtual machines
- .abc (Alembic), a computer graphics file format
- .abc (Clean), an intermediate compiling language used in Clean
- .abc (music notation), a language for notating music using ASCII characters

== See also ==
- ABC (disambiguation)
