= ABC (Monterrey newspaper) =

Periódico ABC
- Type: Daily newspaper
- Format: Europe
- Owner: Epsilon Media Group
- Publisher: Juan Antonio Martinez
- Editor: Miguel González
- Founded: June 15, 1985; 41 years ago
- Headquarters: Rafael Platón Sanchez Sur 411, Centro, C.P. 64000 Monterrey, Nuevo León.
- Circulation: 41,000 daily
- Website: www.abcnoticias.mx

Periódico ABC is a daily newspaper printed and distributed in Monterrey, Nuevo León, Mexico founded in 1985. As of 2003, its daily circulation was 40,000 and its Sunday circulation was 45,000.

In 2015, it won an award for its redesign from the Society of News Design.
