= ABC Radio =

ABC Radio may refer to:

== Australia ==
- ABC Radio (Australian network), the division of the Australian Broadcasting Corporation (ABC) responsible for:
  - ABC Classic, a classical music radio station
  - ABC Classic 2, an un-presented streaming-only classical music radio station
  - ABC NewsRadio, a national 24-hour news radio service available on several platforms
  - ABC Radio National, an Australia-wide radio network
  - ABC Radio Australia, a radio network that broadcasts throughout South-East Asia
  - ABC Sport, a live sports radio station

== Elsewhere ==
- ABC Audio, a US radio network launched as ABC Radio in 2015
  - ABC News Radio, the radio service of the US ABC News
- ABC Radio Network, former name of Cumulus Media Networks, a defunct American radio network
- ABC Radio 1008, radio station broadcast by Asahi Broadcasting Corporation in Osaka, Japan
- ABC Radio 760 AM, broadcast by XEABC-AM, a Mexican radio station
