= ABCD Study =

Brain development study in the United States

The ABCD (Adolescent Brain Cognitive Development) Study is an ongoing longitudinal research study being undertaken by a consortium of 21 data collection sites across the United States. It is the largest long-term study of brain development and child health in the US. The study collects data on the behavior and brain development of over 11,500 children beginning at age 9-10 and continuing through young adulthood. The study collected data from youth in seven primary domains: physical health, mental health, brain imaging, biospecimens, neurocognition, substance use, and culture and environment. Data are also collected from participating youths' parents, including physical health, mental health, substance use, and culture and environment.

== Motivation ==
The ABCD Study is primarily motivated by the need to develop a "baseline" for adolescent brain development. A primary goal of the study is to characterize the development of youth before initiation of substance use, as well as characterizing the impact of substance exposure on adolescent neurocognitive development". Data are also collected on sleep habits, screen time, demographics, clinical measures, imaging, and biological samples to allow a holistic picture of adolescent development.

== Timeline ==
The ABCD Consortium was established in 2015 and data collection began in 2017. The baseline data collection spanned 2017-2018 and was released in 2018. It contained data from all seven original domains. Each year, the subjects return for data collection, but imaging data is only obtained every other year. In addition to the annual comprehensive data collections, there are 15-minute mid-year phone interviews with subjects. The most recent data release was Data Release 4.0 (2021) which contains the baseline data, 1-year follow-up (no imaging), and 2-year follow-up (includes imaging). The mid-year full cohort follow-ups for 6―18 months is also included. There is also limited data (not all subjects) from the 3-year follow-up (no imaging) and 2nd- and 3rd-year mid-year interviews. Data Release 5.0 was originally slated for 2022, but its release has been pushed back. It is estimated to be released in the spring of 2023.

== Youth domains ==
There are seven domains covered in the baseline data collection, including biospecimens, brain imaging, culture & environment, mental health, neurocognition, physical health, and substance use. In year two and the following years, mobile technology & other data sources was added as an eighth domain.

=== Behavior ===
Several behavioral tests and measures are administered, including measures of IQ, language, and working memory.

=== Biospecimens ===
Several different biospecimen samples are collected for the analysis of hormones, DNA, and neurotoxic substances. These biospecimens include hair, blood, saliva, and deciduous (baby) teeth.

Deciduous teeth can be tested for environmental neurotoxins that were encountered at specific ages (even as early as prenatally) by analyzing the chemical content of successive tooth layers. The ABCD Study currently banks teeth provided by participants for future analyses. Examining toxic chemical exposure at various life stages is expected to provide insight into how exposure to substances like heavy metals affects brain and behavior development.

=== Imaging ===
The ABCD imaging protocol includes 3D T1 and 3D T2-weighted scans, as well as diffusion-weighted images, resting state scans, and three functional magnetic resonance imaging (fMRI) tasks. The fMRI tasks include: Monetary Incentive Delay task, Stop Signal task, and the EN-back task (for emotional regulation). Order and version are randomized across subjects, and when taken together the tasks are meant to measure reward processing, motivation, impulsivity, impulse control, working memory, and emotion regulation.

Motion artifacts are a perpetual concern in MRI data acquisition, especially when collecting data from very young or elderly populations. To enhance the data collection during scanning sessions, new ABCD study participants go through a simulated MRI environment where they can receive real-time motion feedback in order to practice being in the scanner.

== Parent domains ==
The baseline metrics for parents of participating subjects focused on the five domains of culture & environment, mental health, physical health, substance use, and other data sources (external data). Mobile technology was also added as an additional domain in year two and following years. Biospecimens, brain imaging, and neurocognitive data were not collected from parents.

== Impact of the COVID-19 pandemic ==
Due to physical distancing advisories connected with the ongoing COVID-19 pandemic, the study was adapted to virtual assessments. It is unclear how profoundly this disturbance will affect the longitudinal arm of the study, and the disruption will likely vary by site.

== Controversy ==
On January 24, 2026, The New York Times published an article which claimed that private ABCD study data had been accessed by researchers who used the data to promote racist and anti-vax ideas. The information had been accessed via the Nation Institute of Health, who sponsored ABCD study. The New York Times also claimed that ABCD study had chosen to not tell their participants that their data had been misused. Scientists in ABCD study said they chose to not tell the participates as they believed doing so could cause more harm than good.

=== Response ===
In the response, ABCD study condemned the misuse of data, added security measures by creating a more secure data hubs with stricter access, elaborated on why they had chosen to not notify ABCD participants and emphasised that no personally identifiable information was released.
