= Airborne Cigar =

World War II-era electronic countermeasure system

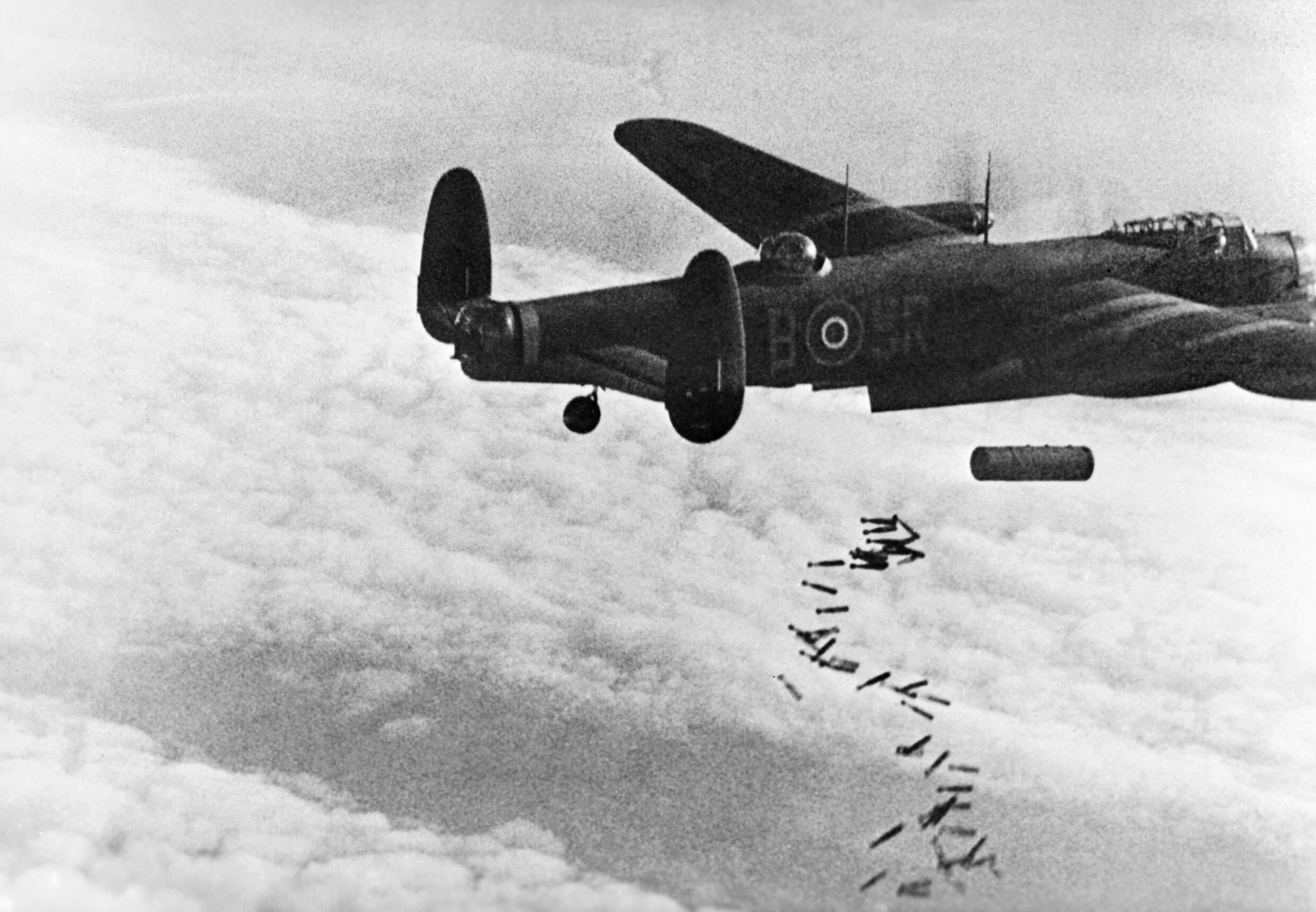
Avro Lancaster B Mark I, NG128 'SR-B', of No. 101 Squadron RAF bombs over the target during a daylight raid on Duisburg on 15 October 1944. The large aerials on top of the Lancaster's fuselage are the antennas for the Airborne Cigar system.

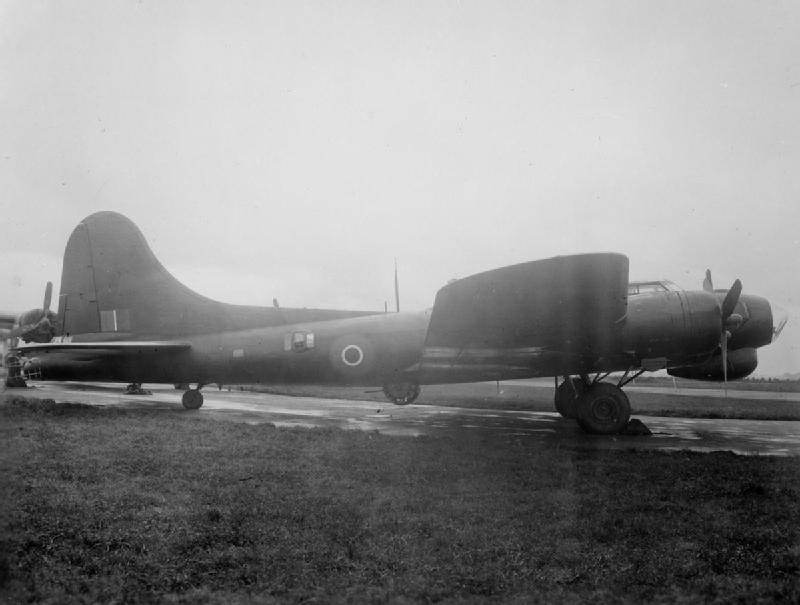
RAF Fortress III HB796 at Prestwick, after being fitted with radio counter-measures equipment by Scottish Aviation. It served with No. 214 Squadron RAF of No. 100 Bomber Group, based at RAF Sculthorpe from November 1944. Equipment includes American AN/APS-15 radar in the large radome under the nose, Airborne Cigar radio-jamming equipment, and an Airborne Grocer aircraft radar jamming installation, the aerials of which can be seen on either side of the tail turret. HB796 was lost on 9 February 1945.

Airborne Cigar, or ABC for short, was a World War II electronic countermeasure (ECM) system developed by the Telecommunications Research Establishment (TRE) to jam Luftwaffe ground-to-air radios operating in the very high frequency (VHF) band. When used properly, the system made enemy night fighter communications almost impossible. The Germans referred to ABC as "dudelsack", German for bagpipes, in reference to the warbling sound.

The system consisted of a wide-band receiver and three tunable transmitters of about 50 W output. The German-speaking Special Duties Operators (SDOs) would listen to signals in the band to determine which frequencies were being used by ground controllers. When one was found, one of the transmitters would be turned to that frequency and begin broadcasting noise. ABC was operated primarily by No. 101 Squadron RAF, part of the specialist No. 100 Group RAF. As the system was only useful over a range of about 50 miles (80 km), their Lancasters were spread out through the bomber stream. Because ABC was used on almost every mission, 101 suffered among the highest losses of the war.

To counteract ABC, the Germans introduced new frequency bands. These were soon discovered and jammed as well. Other attempts, like false ground controllers, using women to send the signals, and other methods, all had little effect, and no effective countermeasure to ABC was found. ABC was later supplanted by Jostle IV, which barraged the entire band beginning on 30 June 1944. The ABC systems moved to No. 462 Squadron RAAF in March 1945. After the war, they were moved to No. 199 Squadron RAF and in 1958 to No. 18 Squadron RAF, ending their long career on the Vickers Valiant.

== History ==
=== Tinsel ===
The idea of jamming the Luftwaffe ground-to-air radios appears to have been introduced in 1942 (Note: All available sources show the various jamming efforts starting in late 1942 and early 1943, lacking any details on their exact origins.) as the main RAF bombing campaign began to ramp up. At the time, the Germans used two sets of frequency bands for air-to-ground communications, the main one in the high frequency (HF) band between 3 and 6 MHz and another in the very high frequency (VHF) band between 38 and 42 MHz.

For the HF frequencies, the Telecommunications Research Establishment (TRE) developed the "Tinsel" system that was fitted to many Lancasters. This consisted of an HF receiver that the operator could scan through the German frequencies, listening for any signals. When they found one being used, they would set their transmitter to the same frequency and send out a signal from a microphone next to the aircraft's engine. First used in December 1942, it was soon realized that the operators didn't have enough time to keep searching for frequencies while operating the rest of their equipment. Additionally, the Germans came up with a useful counter to Tinsel; instead of sending commands to single aircraft, a single very high-power transmitter mass-broadcast a running commentary on the location of the bomber stream.

This resulted in the "Special Tinsel" concept, introduced in June 1943. The frequencies being used by the controllers were not searched out by the radio operator in the aircraft but instead by the Y service signals intercept stations in England. These were then forwarded to the aircraft in coded terms during the half-hour scheduled Group Operational messages sent from Bomber Command. Two-thirds of the Group would then tune their jammer to that signal, creating a powerful source of jamming. In addition, in October, the Corona system was set up; when a frequency in the HF band was seen to be in use, German speakers in England would begin giving out orders to land or indicate that certain airbases were fogged in, causing further confusion.

=== Cigar ===
The Special Tinsel system became increasingly effective, and by the spring of 1943, the Y service was reporting that more and more of the successes being reported by German night fighters were those operating on the newer VHF bands. On 7 April 1943, Bomber Command asked the Air Ministry for a solution, which emerged as "Cigar". Because VHF transmitters of the required power were large, this was built in a ground-based form. The first example was set up at Sizewell and went into operation for the first time on the night of 30/31 July 1943. Unfortunately, it was difficult for the Y service to give any indication of the success of this system because its broadcasts made it impossible for them to hear the night fighter traffic.

The Admiralty also complained as they relied on Y service intercepts to track E-boat operations. This was among the first of many cases where the offended group was forced to demonstrate that their loss of intercept intelligence would have a greater impact than the loss of jamming to Bomber Command, an argument they almost always lost due to Bomber Command's high attrition rates at that time. In this case, Cigar was allowed to continue operation. A more serious concern for Cigar was a lack of range; the VHF signals did not refract around the Earth as well as lower frequencies, meaning that the effect was limited to the line-of-sight. In the case of Cigar, calculations suggested it would be effective to about 140 miles (230 km), which made it useful only against short-range raids in France and over the North Sea.

=== Airborne Cigar ===
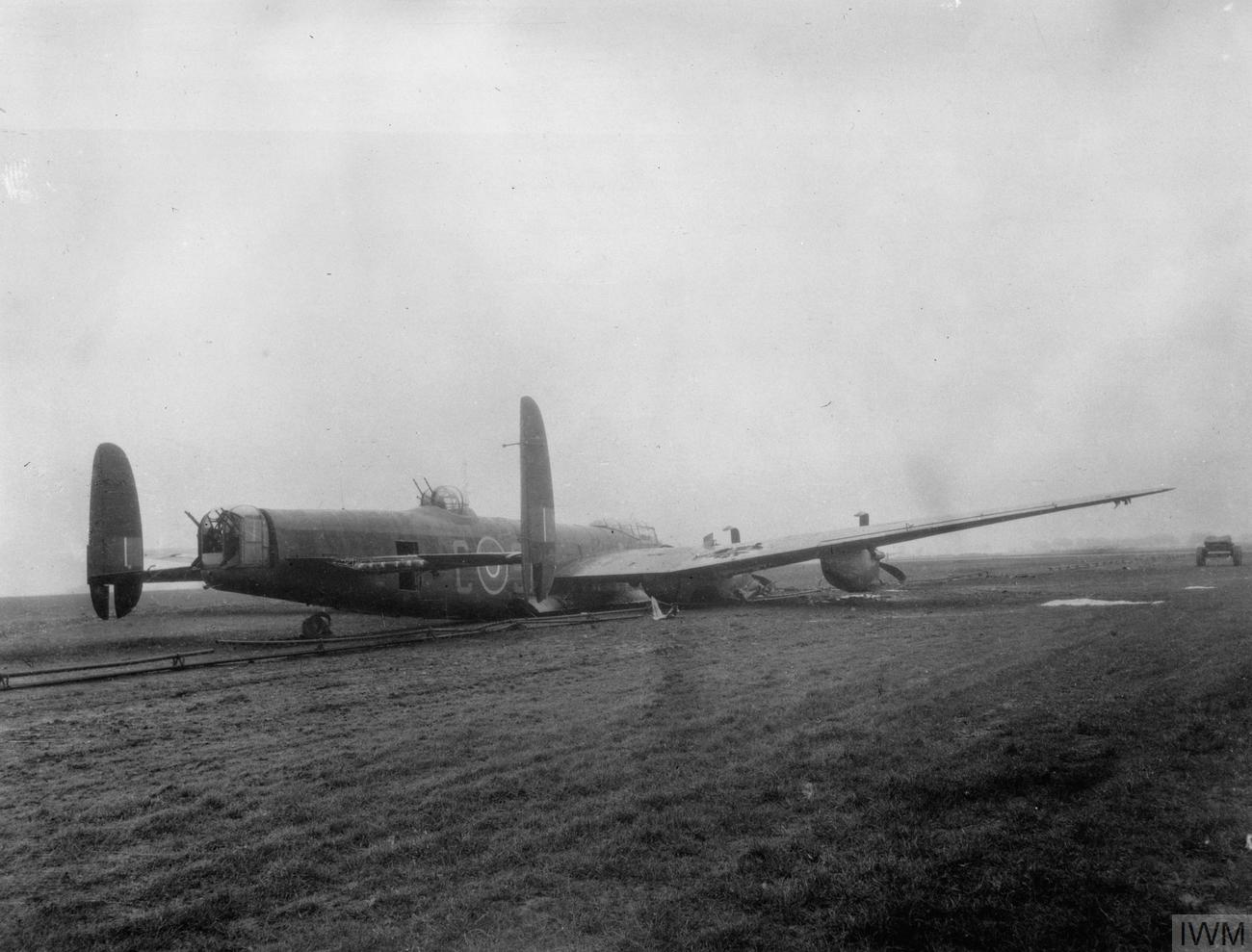
Avro Lancaster B Mark I, ME590 'SR-C', of No. 101 Squadron RAF, lies on the FIDO (Fog Investigation and Dispersal Operation) pipework at Ludford Magna, Lincolnshire, after a successful crash-landing on returning from a raid to Augsburg on the night of 25/26 February 1944. The censor has eliminated the large aerial masts above the fuselage which indicated that the aircraft was carrying 'Airborne Cigar'.

On 6 May 1943, Air Commodore Sidney Osborne Bufton ordered a version of Cigar that could be fitted to an aircraft. This concept naturally became known as the "Airborne Cigar", and as a result, the original retroactively became the "Ground Cigar". Bufton also suggested that "in view of the brevity and simplicity of the term, it is requested that you refer to 'Airborne Cigar' aircraft as ABC aircraft in future communications." The system was originally intended for fitting to No. 100 Squadron RAF bombers, but as these aircraft were in the process of receiving the new H2S radars, they had no leftover electrical power to run the ABC system. Thus No. 101 Squadron RAF was selected, operating the system for much of the war.

Building such a system was tough work; high-power VHF transmitters of the era were quite large, and to be effective an aircraft would have to carry several in order to spot-jam different working frequencies. Ultimately, the system consisted of three transmitters broadcasting from two 7 foot (2.1 m) antenna masts above the wing, with a single specialized receiver and its shorter antenna mounted near the tail of the aircraft. The transmitter electronics were packaged into a large cylinder that massed 275 kilograms (606 lb) and took 3,000 man-hours to install. The bomb load was reduced by about 1,000 pounds (450 kg) as a result. The system was tested 4 to 6 September 1943 and first went into operation on the night of 7/8 October. (Note: A number of works refer to an earlier raid on Hamburg on 22 September, the date used here is from the official Bomber Command history.)

ABC required the operator to listen for any broadcasts in the VHF bands. As these communications were fleeting, they could not simply hunt around the dial looking for transmissions. Instead, a motorized tuner swept the receiver through the entire band 25 times a second. Any signals received were sent to an oscilloscope, causing a vertical "blip" to appear on the display. The horizontal axis of the oscilloscope was connected to a time base generator for the same 1/25 second period, and synchronized to the tuner. Thus, the horizontal position of the blip indicated the frequency of the signal.

When a blip was seen, the operator would then tune a second conventional tuner to the same frequency and began listening to the transmissions. They would listen for certain keywords like "kapelle", giving the target altitude, to identify ground controllers as opposed to other users. To do this, the operator had to have a working knowledge of the German language, and thus, many of the Special Duties Operators (SDOs or SOs) were Yiddish speakers, including a number of men who had escaped from Germany before the war. Once a frequency was identified, one of the three transmitters would be set to jam that frequency and the operator would begin hunting for another signal.

As the effective range of ABC was on the order of 50 miles (80 km), and the bomber streams were often much longer, the ABC aircraft had to be spread out through the stream. This required many ABC aircraft to fly on every mission. As a result, losses among No. 101 were very high; between 18 November 1943 and 24 March 1944, the unit lost seventeen aircraft. Seven were lost on the night of 30/31 March during the disastrous Nuremberg Raid, and another four on 3/4 May.

As was the case for Tinsel, operations were sometimes aided by the Y service's station in West Kingsdown, who would attempt to identify the frequencies and send them to the ABC aircraft using code words. This proved largely ineffective due to range limitations, and ABC was almost always operated purely by the SDOs.

One of ABC's major uses was during the D-Day invasion. In order to convince the Germans that the invasion was taking place near Pas de Calais, a large force of RAF Flying Fortresses dropped Window in patterns that looked like a massive paratrooper landing effort. To protect these aircraft, the entire force of ABC-equipped Lancasters was mustered to disrupt any attempt at interception utterly.

=== Countermeasures ===
By the time ABC was introduced, the Germans had been subject to several previous rounds of jamming and were well familiar with the tactic. They introduced new radio procedures that allowed the ground controller to quickly order the fighters to tune to a new frequency in case one was being jammed. This led to a cat-and-mouse situation with the ABC operators hunting down the new frequency and jamming it, forcing yet another frequency switch. Depending on the proficiency of the ABC operators, even this frequency hopping could be so disrupted as to render fighter operations difficult.

Other attempts were made to disrupt ABC use, including having women make broadcasts (Note: The reason for the use of women controllers is not clear, some sources suggest this was to distract the ABC operators, other suggest it was that their higher-pitched vocalizations were less susceptible to the transmissions.) or, in other cases, producing false signals by playing music on other channels to waste the SDO's time. Another system used captured ABC sets to send out jamming on the frequencies they intended to use, fooling the SDO's into thinking those were already jammed. The transmitter would be turned off immediately before a real broadcast went out.

Y service soon indicated that a new frequency band from 31 to 32 MHz was also being used. This was outside the frequency range of the ABC receiver, so a switch was added to the transmitters that would cause them to send out noise across this entire band. This would be triggered on instructions from the Group Operations messages. It needs to be clarified whether this produced enough jamming to hamper transmissions, and to some degree it was only added to demonstrate to the Germans that they knew of the new frequencies and were one step ahead of them at all times. In any event, the Germans soon abandoned the use of this frequency.

Another attempt to avoid ABC jamming was made by using the now-useless HF bands to transmit Morse code instead of voice. Morse code's stronger signals made it easier to hear over the noise. This required the fighter's radio operator to decode the messages, making it useful only for larger multi-place aircraft where someone could be dedicated to this role. This was almost instantly countered through a new system known as "Drumstick", first used on the night of 21/22 January 1944. After the signal was picked up at the Cheadle Y station, Drumstick sent out random dots and dashes while increasing and decreasing the signal rate to match any potential keying rate from the original operator.

=== Later use ===
Although ABC was effective throughout the war, it made use of German-speaking crewmembers who were in high demand for other roles. Worse, it put them very much in harm's way, and as most were Jewish, the personal risks in case of capture were extremely high.

As a result, ABC was eventually replaced by a new version of the Jostle VHF jammer. Instead of attempting to identify and jam the specific frequencies being used, Jostle produced 2,000 W of power which it broadcast across the entire ground-to-air band. This required no "operation", it simply had to be turned on when needed. Jostle-equipped aircraft would broadcast on a random time slot to avoid allowing German night fighters to use the broadcasts as a homing source.

Those ABC units still operational were removed from No. 101 and moved to the Handley Page Halifaxes of No. 462 Squadron RAAF. They began operations in March 1945.

ABC remained in use in the post-war era; the specialist No. 199 Squadron RAF fitted four ABC transmitters to their force of Avro Lincolns and a single example in their de Havilland Mosquitos. They later fitted one to their English Electric Canberra, and later still to their Vickers Valiants, which had enough electrical power for six transmitters. When No. 199 stood down in 1958, the Valiants were sent to RAF Finningley and became the newly reformed No. 18 Squadron RAF. It is not recorded when the last of these retired.

Beyond these specialist units, it was Jostle that set the pattern for more modern jammers and remained in use until replaced by Green Palm on the V bomber fleet.
