= Alphabet (disambiguation) =

An alphabet is a standard set of letters used to write one or more languages.

Alphabet or The Alphabet may also refer to:

== Language ==
- Alphabet (formal languages), in formal language theory, a finite sequence of members of an underlying base set
- English alphabet, a Latin alphabet consisting of 26 letters used to write the English language
- ISO basic Latin alphabet, a character-encoding standard

== Art, entertainment, and media ==
=== Films ===
- The Alphabet (film), a 1968 short film by David Lynch
- Alphabet, a 2013 Austrian documentary by Erwin Wagenhofer

=== Computer games ===
- Alphabet (video game), a 2013 game by Keita Takahashi and Adam Saltsman

=== Literature ===
- Alphabet (poetry collection), a 1981 book by Danish poet Inger Christensen
- The Alphabet, a "life work" poem by Ron Silliman, 1979–2004

=== Music ===
- "Alphabet Song", a song used to recite the English alphabet
- "Alphabet" (Amanda Lear song), 1977
- "Alphabet", a 2021 song by Shame off the album Drunk Tank Pink

== Brands and enterprises ==
- Alphabet Inc., the holding company for Google and other subsidiaries

== See also ==
- Alphabet. Alphabets., a 2006 album by American experimental rock band Trophy Scars
- List of writing systems
- "The Alphabet Song"
- Alphabeta (disambiguation)
- Alphabetical (disambiguation)
- ABC (disambiguation)
