= A-b-c-darian =

Youngest students in the typical one-room school of 19th-century America

A-B-C-darians, ABC-darians, or abecedarians were the youngest students (then called scholars) in the typical one-room school of 19th-century America.

The name comes from its original purpose which was mainly restricted to learning the alphabet. It could also refer to someone teaching the alphabet.

== Early references ==
In his autobiographical reminiscences on his school days, Warren Burton recounted that he "was three years and a half old when I first entered the Old School-house as an abecedarian". Many young children were simply sent along with other siblings in order to get them out of their mothers' way. Noah Webster's early school dictionary (1838) contains the following entry: "A-be-ce-da'-ri-an, n. One who teaches or is learning the alphabet."

== Front row seats ==
In the district schools of the early 19th century, the youngest scholars were seated on the front benches in a room that typically had floors that sloped up from the center on three sides like a small amphitheater. The entrance door(s) and the teacher's desk were located on the unsloped side. The desks accommodated two or more scholars and were arranged up the ramps around a center space, the front of each desk providing the seat for the desk before it, with the front rows consisting only of the benches attached to the desks of the second row where the youngest children sat. Samuel Griswold Goodrich (a.k.a. "Peter Parley") attended a district school around 1810 in which "The larger scholars were ranged on the outer sides, at the desks; the smaller fry of a-b-c-darians were seated in the center". Warren Burton also noted that "next to the spelling floor, were low, narrow seats for abecedarians and others near that rank. In general, the older the scholar the further from the front was his location".

== A day in the life of an a-b-c-darian ==
A-b-c-darians in unreformed schools were drilled in their letters two or three times a day, then spent the rest of the school day on their own trying to recall the names of letters, and probably watching the recitations of older scholars who were called to the middle of the room to show what they had learned for the schoolmaster. Educator William Augustus Mowry recalled that "I was sent to the old brick schoolhouse when I was four years old. Two or three others entered school at the same A-B-C time. We sat on the low seat facing the open Class floor—the boys on one side and the girls on the other. We had nothing to do but to look on and thus cultivate our powers of observation. With all the classes of an ungraded school to teach, of course the teacher could give but a few minutes to the three A-B-C darians, who had just entered the school. Twice a day we were called up and took our places at the teacher's knee. Here we received our first lessons in learning to read; and this reading lesson of five minutes in the forenoon and five minutes in the afternoon was all we had to do".

== Reform ==
Beginning in the 1830s, education reform included consideration of how to improve instruction for all students, including the a-b-c-darians. Education reformer Henry Barnard shared in the American Journal of Education that "Basedow at Magdeburg Johann Bernhard Basedow, adopted a constructive method of teaching the letters, by presenting them made in gingerbread—then rewarding success in remembering the name by gift of the substance. This founder of Philanthropinism should be held in everlasting and grateful remembrance by A-b-c-darians". In the 1850s it was reported that in some, modifications had already taken place: "The A B C darians are each in a separate class, and are instructed in a very uniform style".

By contrast, New York educators continued to complain of poor methods for the younger students into the 1860s. "The habit of requiring the children of the alphabet class to give formal definitions to words which are far more simple than those used to define them, is a practice which I have endeavored to discourage. For instance, such words as father, mother, brother, sister, boy, girl, etc., it is not uncommon to hear defined by these little A-B-C-darians, in this manner:—"Mother—a female parent; brother—a male child born of the same parents; girl—a female child; cat— a domestic animal; cow—a domestic animal", &c."

== Obsolescence ==
By the end of the 19th century, the mere use of the term represented a bygone era of the one-room schoolhouse. George Howland, superintendent of the Chicago Public Schools declared in 1898 that "The days of the A-B-C-darians, and the three R's—all! ah! and alas!—have happily gone by, and hard after them are following those to whom the ability to trace with index-finger, word by word, and line by line, the pupil's progress down the page of the text-book, was enough".
