= ABCD Schema =

Data exchange and access model

The Access to Biological Collections Data (ABCD) schema is a highly structured data exchange and access model for taxon occurrence data (specimens, observations, etc. of living organisms), i.e. primary biodiversity data.

In 2006, an 'Extension For Geosciences' was added to the schema, to form the ABCDEFG Schema, and in 2010, Biodiversity Information Standards (TDWG) published a draft standard extension for DNA, called ABCDDNA.
