= Alphabetical (disambiguation) =

Alphabetical may refer to:

- Alphabetical order, a ranking of words by the conventional ordering of an alphabet
- Alphabetical (album), a 2004 album by the French indie pop band Phoenix
- Alphabetical (game show), a British television game show
