= ABC (1906 automobile) =

Defunct American motor vehicle manufacturer

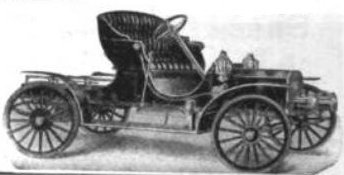
- Advertisement in Popular Mechanics
- Industry: Automotive
- Founded: 1905
- Defunct: 1910
- Headquarters: St. Louis, Missouri
- Products: Automobiles; Trucks; Tractors

ABC was an American high wheeler automobile built by Albert Bledsoe Cole in St. Louis, Missouri, USA, from 1905 to 1910.

Known as the Autobuggy (Note: Not to be confused with the Auto-Buggy that was made by Success Automobile Manufacturing Company.) from 1906 to 1908, it was sold as "the cheapest high-grade car in America", and was available with 18 hp (13 kW) two-cylinder and 30 hp (22 kW) four-cylinder engines, friction drive, and pneumatic or solid tires. The drive system used a cone and two bevel wheels, one for forward and the other for reverse. This allowed it to reach its 30 mph (48 km/h) top speed in either direction. A larger engine was fitted in 1908, and the wheelbase grew from 72 in (180 cm) to 90 in (230 cm). Its high ground clearance made it popular in rural areas.

Later models were more conventional with two- or four-cylinder engines, but the market for high wheelers was disappearing and the company folded in 1910.
