= Handley Page Type E =

Type E (H.P.5)
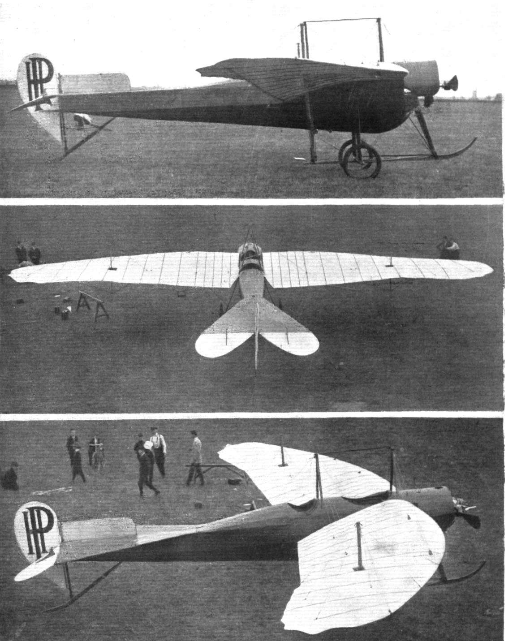

General information
- Type: Company demonstrator
- National origin: United Kingdom
- Manufacturer: Handley Page
- Designer: Frederick Handley Page
- Number built: 1

History
- First flight: April 1912
- Retired: 1914

The Handley Page Type E was a two-seat, single-engined monoplane intended as a demonstrator. Though only one was built, it flew successfully from 1912 to 1914, carrying several hundred passengers and flying several thousand miles.

== Design and development ==
The Handley Page Type E tandem seat monoplane was begun in the hope of winning a War Office competition late in 1911, but the specifications looked hard to meet, so it was decided to complete the machine as a demonstrator and submit a new design (the Type F) for the military prize. The Type E had a good deal in common with its smaller, single-seat predecessor, the Type D. Both were single-engined high-wing aircraft with the characteristic wing plan inherited from the José Weiss patent. Less technically, both the wings and tails of both machines were varnished yellow, though the fabric-covered fuselage of the Type E was doped bright blue in contrast to the dull grey finish of the Type D. Unsurprisingly, the Type E also inherited the name Yellow Peril.

The wings of the Type E had a strongly curved leading edge and a straight but swept back trailing edge. Towards the tip, the trailing edge was extended rearwards to make it more flexible for wing warping. The wings were built around two spars and wire-braced, both above and below to points on the front and rear spars from a pair of fuselage-mounted inverted-V struts, one just forward of each cockpit and joined by a horizontal tie rod. A kingpost was fixed to the rear spar toward the tip where the outer bracing wires were fixed. When this post was moved fore and aft by separate control wires, the wing was warped for lateral control.

The fuselage was built around four ash longerons, equally spaced at the front but tapering to a vertical edge at the tail. Underneath the fuselage was a deep central keel, so the lower fuselage cross-section was triangular; on top there was a rounded decking. The tailplane was of steeply swept delta plan like that of the Type D, but carried twin elevators of roughly half-heart shape. In contrast to the Type D, the rudder post was firmly fixed to the fuselage and did not move with the elevators; the rudder was similar in shape to the elevators, moving between them and behind a long rectangular fin. The pilot's open cockpit was a little behind the leading edge of the wing, just aft of the spar and bigger than the passenger's, placed behind the rear spar near the trailing edge. The pilot warped the wings by turning a wheel mounted on a lever which could also be moved fore and aft, operating the elevators. There was a "foot tiller" for rudder control.

The Type E was powered by a 50 hp (37 kW) Gnome rotary engine. These engines were well regarded but produced a lot of hot oil, so a half cowling was installed to shield the pilot. The mainwheels were mounted at the ends of a pair of sprung telescopic legs and joined by a centrally hinged axle with a further pair of fixed struts forming an inverted W arrangement. This structure was stiffened and the aircraft protected against nose-over by a long central skid which curved upwards well forward of the propeller, mounted to the fuselage by a fore and aft pair of inverted-V struts and also joined to the axle hinge. There was a long tailskid which met the ground at the bottom of the rudder post.

The Type E made its first straight hops on 26 April 1912 at the Handley Page field at Fairlop and was soon performing well enough to fly to the works at Barking, piloted by Edward Petre. On 27 July it flew from Fairlop to Brooklands on a complicated 55 mile route avoiding the built-up parts of London. In late September, after a period in which Handley Page were preoccupied with the military trials of the Type F and the move of their works from Barking to Cricklewood, the Type E was flown to Hendon by Wilfred Parke and then used to carry some 28 passengers on joy flights, including two children together. It was also flown by other, non-company pilots until sustaining minor damage. During repair the rectangular fin was replaced by a triangular one. Handling was improved and several flights were made with three passengers before the aircraft was spruced up for its appearance at the Olympia Show in February 1913, where it was inspected by King George V. Immediately afterwards a new wing was fitted with the wing warping system replaced by ailerons formed by hinging the outer trailing edge extensions; the earlier side-to-side rolling characteristic was cured. The Type E flew exhibitions, demonstrations and joy rides through the Summer of 1913, mostly in the north of England. It was then modified for use as an advanced single-seat trainer for a flying school at Hendon. The fuselage was shortened by 14 in (356 mm) and the separate pairs of fuselage struts that carried the wing bracing wires were replaced by a four-strut pyramid. The earlier undercarriage was replaced by a simpler arrangement of the kind used on the B.E.2c, with a solid axle and two skids. It flew in that form on 4 July 1914 and was in use to the start of World War I, when it was first impressed, then discarded. The aircraft did not fly again, but made a few celebratory outings and survived until 1940, when it was destroyed to make space in the Radlett factory. In the retrospective type redesignation of 1924, the Yellow Peril or Type E became the H.P.5.

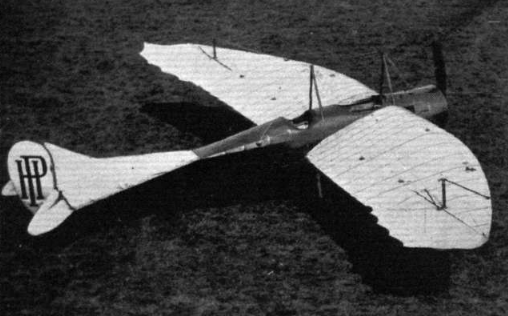
With ailerons and new fin

== Specifications (Two seater) ==
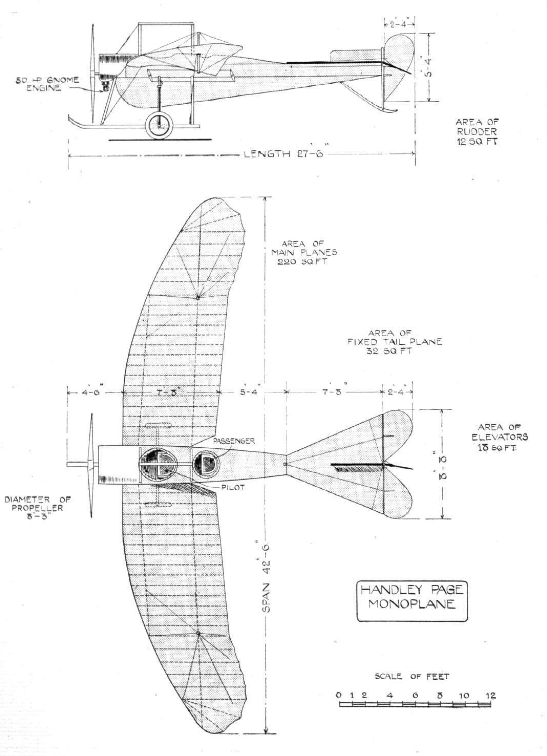
Early (1912) version

Data from Barnes & James 1987, p. 63

General characteristics

- Crew: one
- Capacity: up to three passengers
- Length: 28 ft 2 in (8.6 m)
- Wingspan: 42 ft 6 in (12.9 m)
- Wing area: 240 sq ft (22.3 m^{2})
- Empty weight: 800 lb (363 kg)
- Gross weight: 1,300 lb (590 kg)
- Powerplant: 1 × Gnome et Rhône 7-cylinder rotary , 50 hp (37 kW)

Performance

- Maximum speed: 60 mph (96 km/h, 52 kn)
- Endurance: 3 hours
