= Handley Page Hendon =

Hendon
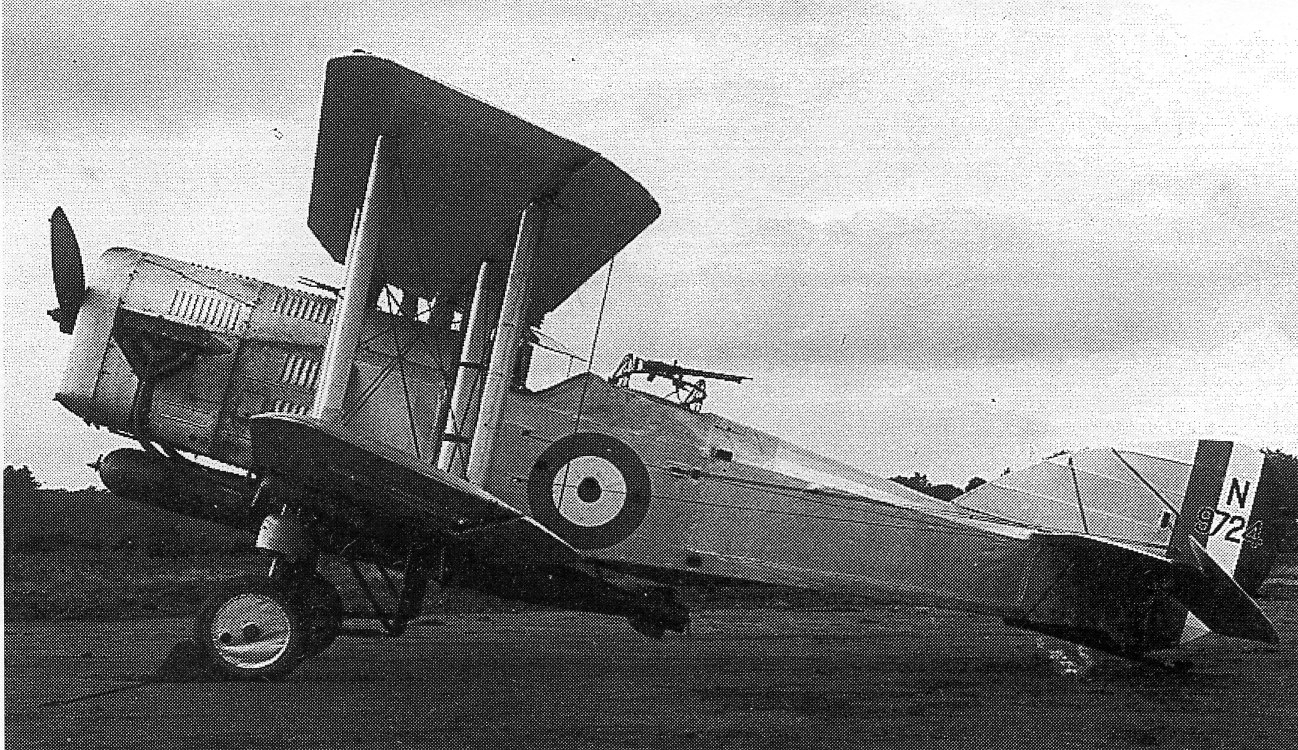

General information
- Type: Torpedo bomber
- National origin: United Kingdom
- Manufacturer: Handley Page
- Status: Prototypes
- Number built: 6

History
- First flight: 1924
- Retired: 1927
- Developed from: Handley Page Hanley

The Handley Page Hendon was a British torpedo bomber of the 1920s. A two-seat development of Handley Page's earlier single-seat Hanley, the Hendon was a single-engine biplane. While six aircraft were purchased by the British Air Ministry for evaluation and trials purposes, no further production ensued and the Hendon did not enter squadron service.

== Development and design ==
While the single-seat Handley Page Hanley had lost to the similar Blackburn Dart in fulfilling the requirements for a carrier-based torpedo bomber to equip Britain's Fleet Air Arm, it was recognised by both Handley Page and the Air Ministry that a two-seat aircraft would be more useful both for operational purposes and for experimental work. An order was therefore placed on 27 November 1923 for six two-seat derivatives of the Hanley III, designated the Type Ta (later known as the H.P.25) or Handley Page Hendon to meet the requirements of Air Ministry Specification 25/23 for an interim torpedo bomber.

The first of the six aircraft to fly, (serial N9724) flew on 7 July 1924, with the remaining five flying by September. It had a longer fuselage to accommodate the observer, who was provided with a .303 in (7.7 mm) Lewis Gun on a Scarff ring mounting, but initially, was similar to the Hanley III. Tests showed that it was tailheavy when carrying a torpedo, the outer wings being swept back by six degrees to avoid this.

== Operational history ==
The six Hendons were used for extensive trials to investigate various configurations of leading edge slots/slats. These allowed one aircraft to successfully land on HMS Furious while carrying a torpedo and without using arrestor gear. No further production occurred, the development of automatic slots in October 1927 making the Hendon obsolete.

== Variants ==
Hendon I
Initial configuration. Leading edge slots as Hanley III. Six built.
Hendon II
Improved slot gear. Three converted.
Hendon III
Slotted Flaps. One converted from Hendon II.

== Specifications (Hendon) ==
Data from Handley Page Aircraft since 1907.

General characteristics

- Crew: 2
- Length: 36 ft 6 in (11.13 m)
- Wingspan: 46 ft 0 in (14.02 m)
- Height: 13 ft 8 in (4.17 m)
- Wing area: 562 sq ft (52.2 m^{2})
- Empty weight: 4,350 lb (1,973 kg)
- Gross weight: 6,970 lb (3,162 kg)
- Powerplant: 1 × Napier Lion IIB W-12 water-cooled piston engine, 450 hp (340 kW)
- Propellers: 2-bladed fixed-pitch propeller

Performance

- Maximum speed: 110 mph (180 km/h, 96 kn)
- Stall speed: 55 mph (89 km/h, 48 kn)
- Service ceiling: 9,500 ft (2,900 m)
- Wing loading: 12.4 lb/sq ft (61 kg/m^{2})
- Power/mass: 0.065 hp/lb (0.107 kW/kg)

Armament

- Guns: 1 × .303 in (7.7 mm) forward firing Vickers machine gun and 1 × .303 in (7.7 mm) Lewis gun in rear cockpit
- Bombs: 1 × 18 in (457 mm) torpedo or 2 × 230 lb (105 kg) bombs

== See also ==
Related development

- Handley Page Hanley

Aircraft of comparable role, configuration, and era

- Blackburn Velos
