= Albatros L 72 =

L 72
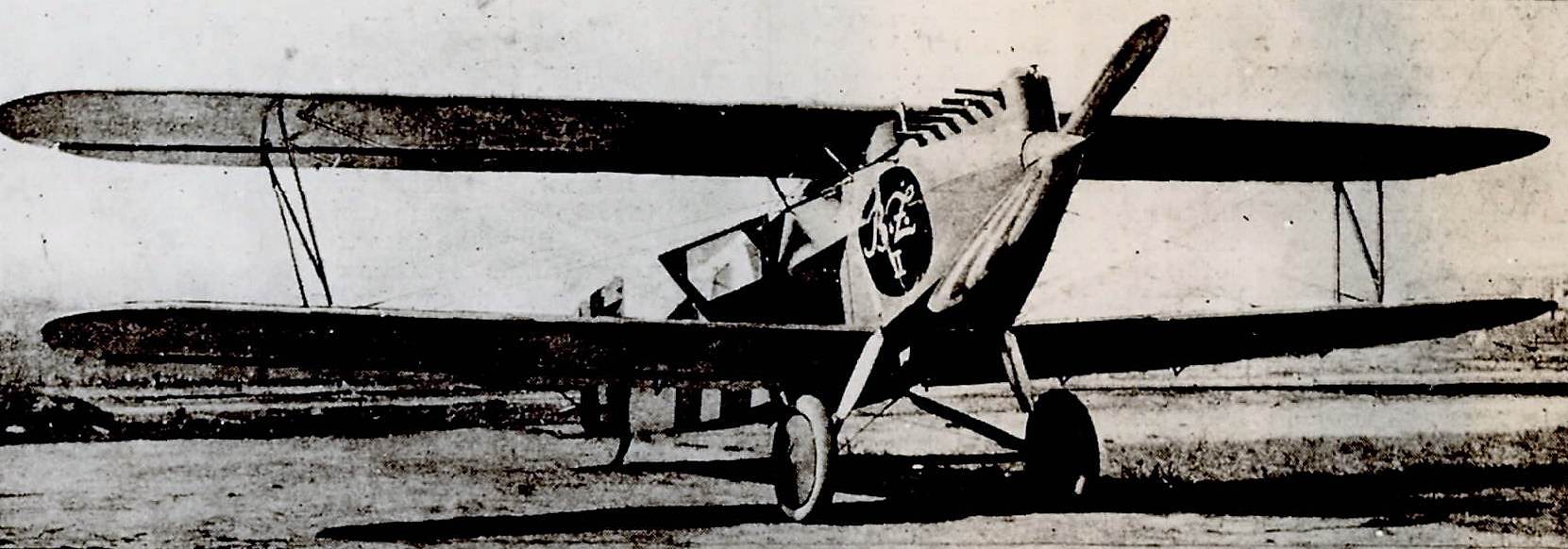

General information
- Type: Cargo aircraft
- Manufacturer: Albatros Flugzeugwerke
- Designer: Gustav Lachmann
- Number built: 4

History
- First flight: 1926

The Albatros L 72 was a German transport aircraft of the 1920s, designed to carry newspapers between German cities for Ullstein Verlag. A single revised example was built for the Hamburger Fremdenblatt.

== Design and development ==
The L 72 was a single-engine biplane of conventional configuration with unstaggered wings of equal span. It was the first German commercial aircraft to incorporate leading edge slots and trailing-edge flaps. The upper and lower wings were interchangeable. They were of all metal construction with fabric covering. The thickened centre section of the upper wing contained the fuel tanks. The upper wing was carried on a tubular cabane and one set of 'N' formation interplane struts was provided with stream-lined wire bracing. The fuselage was built of welded steel tubing with diagonal wire bracing and was fabric covered. Aft of the pilot's cockpit was a cabin containing a conveyor-like device which could accept up to sixteen parcels of newspapers weighing 10 kg (22 lb) each. These could then be dropped, either by an attendant travelling in the cabin or by the pilot, an indicator in the cockpit indicating how many parcels had been dropped. A novel feature of the tail was the rudder and fin which were both pivoted in such a way that when the rudder was turned the fin also turned around a vertical axis thus providing a more powerful rudder control for a smaller angular movement

== Variants ==
- L 72a
- L 72b - two examples for Ullstein AG
- L 72c Albis - one example for Hamburger Fremdenblatt

== Specifications (L.72a) ==
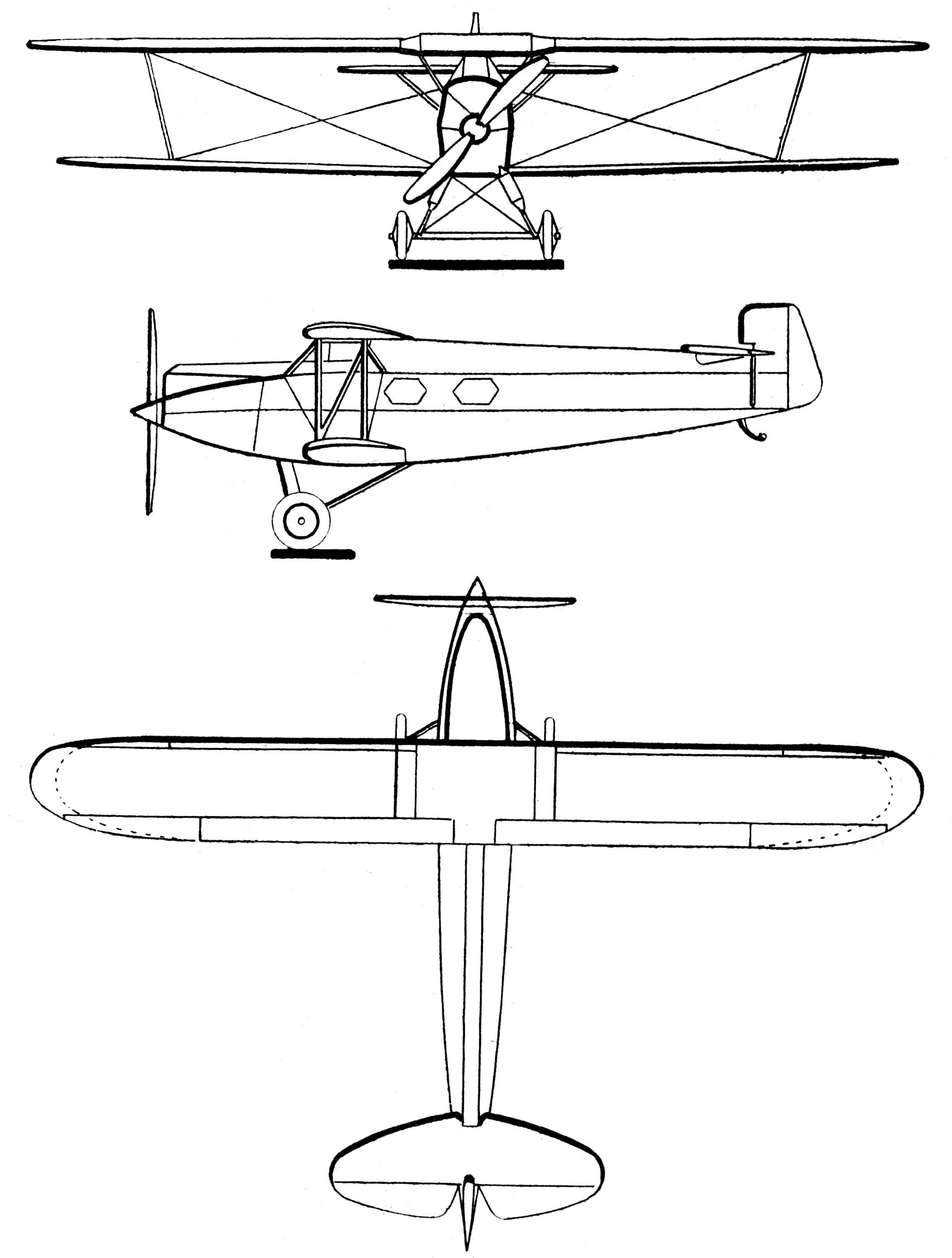
Albatros L 72 3-view drawing from Les Ailes May 6, 1926

Data from Flight, 15 April 1926, p.231

General characteristics

- Crew: two, pilot and engineer
- Capacity: 4 passengers or 2 handlers plus 160 kg (353 lb) of newspapers
- Length: 10.5 m (34 ft 5 in)
- Wingspan: 12.8 m (42 ft 0 in)
- Wing area: 36 m^{2} (390 sq ft)
- Empty weight: 1,300 kg (2,866 lb)
- Gross weight: 2,000 kg (4,409 lb)
- Powerplant: 1 × BMW IV , 160 kW (220 hp)
- Propellers: 2-bladed

Performance

- Maximum speed: 160 km/h (99 mph, 86 kn)
- Cruise speed: 170 km/h (110 mph, 92 kn)
- Endurance: 4.5 hr
- Landing speeds: 100 knm/h (62 mph) with slots closed, 75 km/h (47 mph) open
