= HP4 =

HP4 or variant, may refer to:

- HP4, a postcode for Berkhamsted, see HP postcode area
- hP4, a Pearson symbol
- Harry Potter and the Goblet of Fire, the fourth Harry Potter novel
- Harry Potter and the Goblet of Fire (film), the fourth Harry Potter film
- Handley Page Type D a.k.a. H.P.4, an airplane
- HP-4, a glider designed by Richard Schreder
- HP4, a type of photographic stock, see Ilford HP
- HP4, a version of the BMW S1000RR produced between 2013 and 2014.

== See also ==
- HP (disambiguation)
