= HP6 =

HP6 or variant, may refer to:

- HP6, a postcode for Amersham, see HP postcode area
- hP6, a Pearson symbol
- Harry Potter and the Half-Blood Prince, the sixth Harry Potter novel
- Harry Potter and the Half-Blood Prince (film), the sixth Harry Potter film
- Handley Page Type F a.k.a. H.P.6, an airplane
- HP-6, a glider designed by Richard Schreder

== See also ==
- HP (disambiguation)
