= Handley Page Hanley =

Torpedo bomber aircraft

Hanley
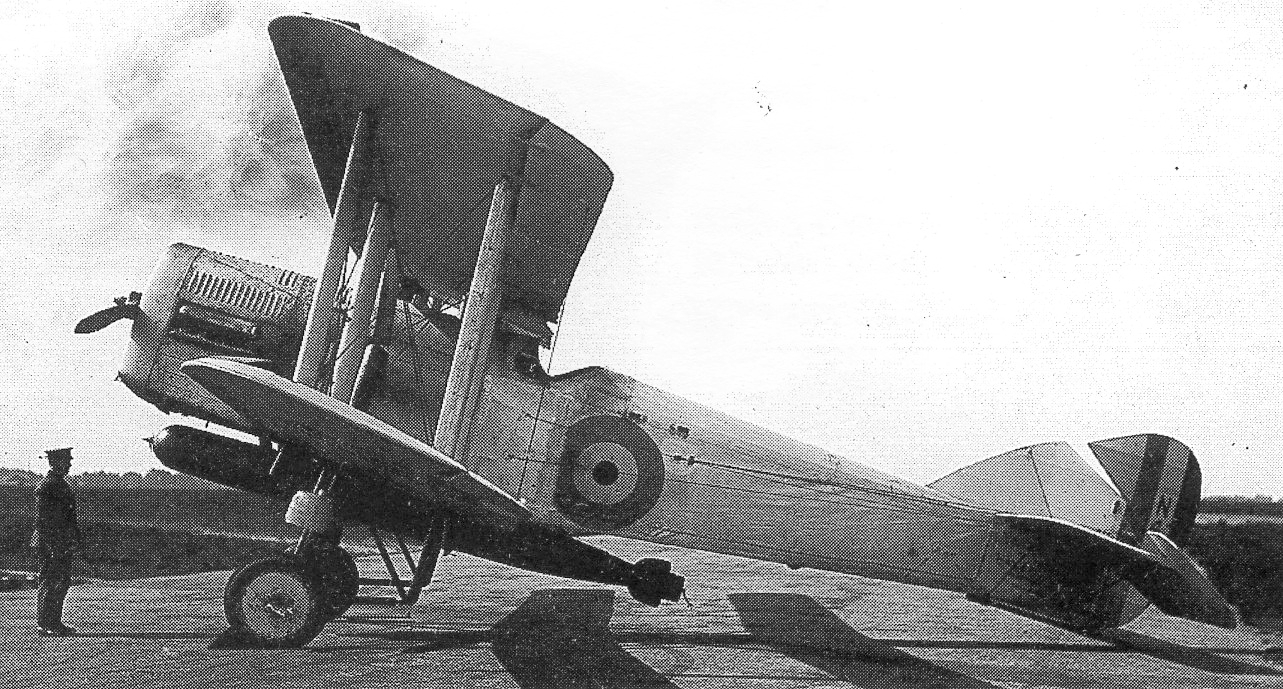

General information
- Type: Torpedo bomber
- National origin: United Kingdom
- Manufacturer: Handley Page
- Status: Prototype
- Number built: 3

History
- First flight: 3 January 1922
- Variant: Handley Page Hendon

The Handley Page Hanley was a British torpedo bomber aircraft of the 1920s. A single-engine, single-seat biplane intended to operate from the Royal Navy's aircraft carriers, it was not successful, with only three aircraft being built.

== Design and development ==
In late 1920, Handley Page started design of a new single-seat torpedo bomber to meet the requirements of Air Ministry Specification 3/20 for a carrier-based aircraft to replace the Sopwith Cuckoo, in competition with the Blackburn Dart. The resulting design, the Type T, (later known as the H.P.19) and named the Hanley was a single-engine biplane of wooden construction. It, like the Dart, was powered by a Napier Lion engine and had a crew of one. It had folding three-bay wings which were fitted with full-span leading edge slots on both upper and lower wings in order to improve low-speed handling.

Three prototypes were ordered, the first of which (serialed N143) flew on 3 January 1922. Initial testing revealed that performance was disappointing with low speed handling, and that the view from the cockpit was also poor. After being damaged in a crash landing, the first prototype was rebuilt with new wingtips, a revised two-bay wing and with the control cables for the elevators enclosed in the rear fuselage to reduce drag, flying in December 1922 as the Hanley Mark II. These changes improved performance, but handling was still poor. The third prototype was therefore fitted with revised slots, as well as the drag reduction changes tested on the Hanley Mark II, the revised aircraft being designated Hanley Mark III, demonstrating considerably improved handling.

By the time that the Hanley Mark III was available for testing, the Dart, which was developed from Blackburn's earlier Swift, had already been ordered into service.

== Specifications (Hanley III) ==
Data from Handley Page Aircraft since 1907

General characteristics

- Crew: 1
- Length: 33 ft 4 in (10.16 m)
- Wingspan: 46 ft 0 in (14.02 m)
- Height: 14 ft 2 in (4.32 m)
- Wing area: 562 sq ft (52.2 m^{2})
- Empty weight: 3,640 lb (1,651 kg) Hanley I
- Gross weight: 6,444 lb (2,923 kg)
- Powerplant: 1 × Napier Lion IIB W-12 water-cooled piston engine, 450 hp (340 kW)
- Propellers: 3-bladed fixed-pitch propeller

Performance

- Maximum speed: 116 mph (187 km/h, 101 kn)
- Stall speed: 55 mph (89 km/h, 48 kn)
- Service ceiling: 15,000 ft (4,600 m)
- Wing loading: 11.5 lb/sq ft (56 kg/m^{2})
- Power/mass: 0.070 hp/lb (0.115 kW/kg)

Armament

- Bombs: 1 × 18 in (457 mm) torpedo

== See also ==
Related development

- Handley Page Hendon

Aircraft of comparable role, configuration, and era

- Blackburn Dart
