= Handley Page Type G =

Type G
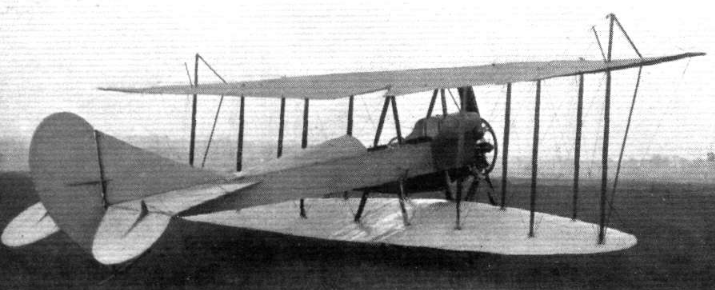

General information
- Type: 2-seat biplane
- National origin: United Kingdom
- Manufacturer: Handley Page Limited
- Designer: Frederick Handley Page
- Number built: 1

History
- First flight: 6 November 1913
- Retired: 1915

The Handley Page Type G was a two-seat British biplane, designed by Handley Page that first flew in 1913. Only one was built.

== Development ==
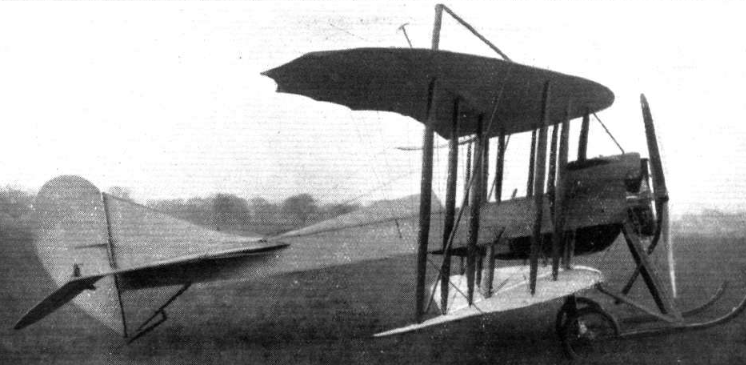

The Type G was the first biplane wholly designed by Handley Page. In 1924 the early Handley Page types were give a retrospective design number and the Type G became the H.P.7. Its immediate precursors were monoplanes (Types D, E & F), all of which used a wing of very unusual planform, having a strongly curved leading edge together with a slightly swept and almost straight trailing edge. The Type D and the larger, two-seat Type E were popularly known as the "Antiseptic" and the "Yellow Peril" because of the colour of the anti-corrosion paint on wings and tail.

The Type G used wings of the same plan though of unequal span. It was a three bay biplane having slight wing stagger, with two pairs of separate but wire braced interplane struts per wing. Only the upper wings carried ailerons, which were operated via king posts that appeared as extra interplane struts near the wingtips, but extending above the upper wing and carrying the control wires. The details of this arrangement were modified at least once. The slender fuselage was positioned between the wings with struts above and below. It was flat sided, with a curved decking behind the pilot who sat in the rear seat. An early photo shows a single cockpit opening, but later there were two separate open cockpits for passenger and pilot. The pilot's upward view was assisted by a small V-shaped trailing edge cutout. The horizontal stabiliser and fin were sharply swept at their leading edges. There were separate elevators and a rudder of half-heart shape, the point extending well below the fuselage to about the level of the lower wing.

In its early form the Type G had a two-wheeled single axle main undercarriage mounted by a pair of struts on each side, one forward to the engine bulkhead and one rearwards to the fuselage via the main spar. Initially the wheels were supplemented by a pair of skids to avoid nosing over, but these were later discarded. A long tail strut positioned a sprung tailskid just below the lower tip of the rudder. The aircraft was powered by a 100 hp (75 kW) Anzani 10 radial engine. The prominent pair of semicircular exhaust tubes characteristic of this engine fed a single exhaust pipe which curved away under the aircraft via a silencer, ending near the trailing edge.

== Operational history ==
The Type G flew successfully and usefully between 1913 and 1915. It was designed to have inherent stability and for a time, early in its life, demonstrated this by flying without its tailfin. Before the First World war it was flown by Rowland Ding, who later became Blackburn's main test pilot. He took it to various aviation meetings and also made a cross-channel flight with Princess Lowenstein Wertheim as a passenger. He also made many flights between meetings with his wife and six-year-old daughter in the front seat, qualifying the Type G as a three-seater.

At the outbreak of war in 1914 the Type G was bought by the Royal Naval Air Service and was based at Hendon, being used for training and defence. During its service life it carried a Union Jack and the number 892 on the rudder. On one occasion, mistaken by London ground forces for a German Taube because of the wing shape, it was caught in a "friendly fire" incident but survived. It was finally written off in a ground accident at RNAS Chingford in August 1915.

== Specifications ==
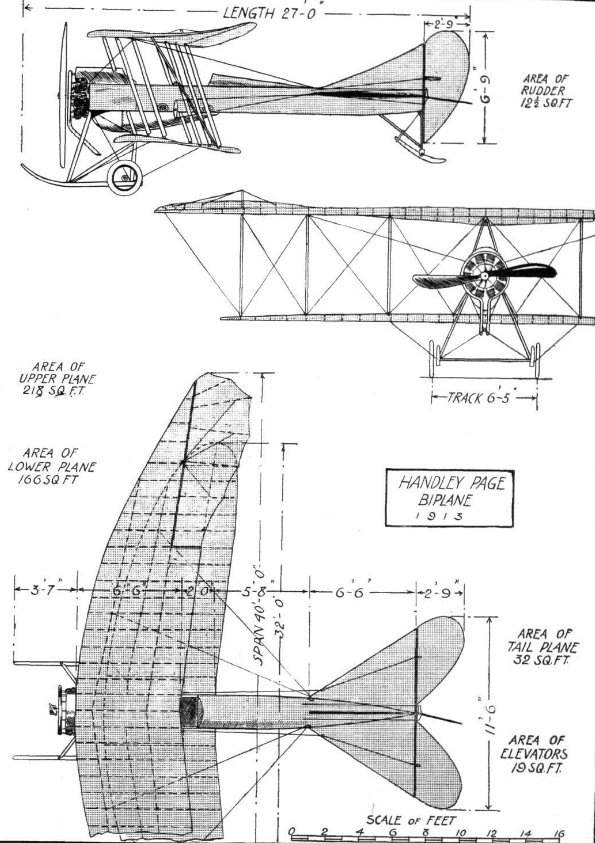

Data from Barnes & James 1987, p. 73

General characteristics

- Crew: one
- Capacity: one or two passengers
- Length: 25 ft 1 in (7.64 m) (without skids)
- Wingspan: 40 ft 0 in (12.2 m)
- Wing area: 384 sq ft (35.67 m^{2})
- Empty weight: 1,150 lb (522 kg)
- Gross weight: 1,775 lb (805 kg)
- Powerplant: 1 × Anzani 10 ten cylinder two row air-cooled radial , 100 hp (75 kW)

Performance

- Maximum speed: 73 mph (117 km/h, 63 kn)
- Endurance: 4 hours
- Rate of climb: 286 ft/min (1.45 m/s) to 3,000 ft (914 m)
