= HP5 =

HP5 or variant, may refer to:

- HP5, a postcode for Chesham, see HP postcode area
- hP5, a Pearson symbol
- Harry Potter and the Order of the Phoenix, the fifth Harry Potter novel
- Harry Potter and the Order of the Phoenix (film), the fifth Harry Potter film
- Handley Page Type E a.k.a. H.P.5, an airplane
- HP-5, a glider designed by Richard Schreder
- HP5 and HP5+, a type of photographic stock, see Ilford HP

== See also ==
- HP (disambiguation)
