= Handley Page H.P.20 =

H.P.20
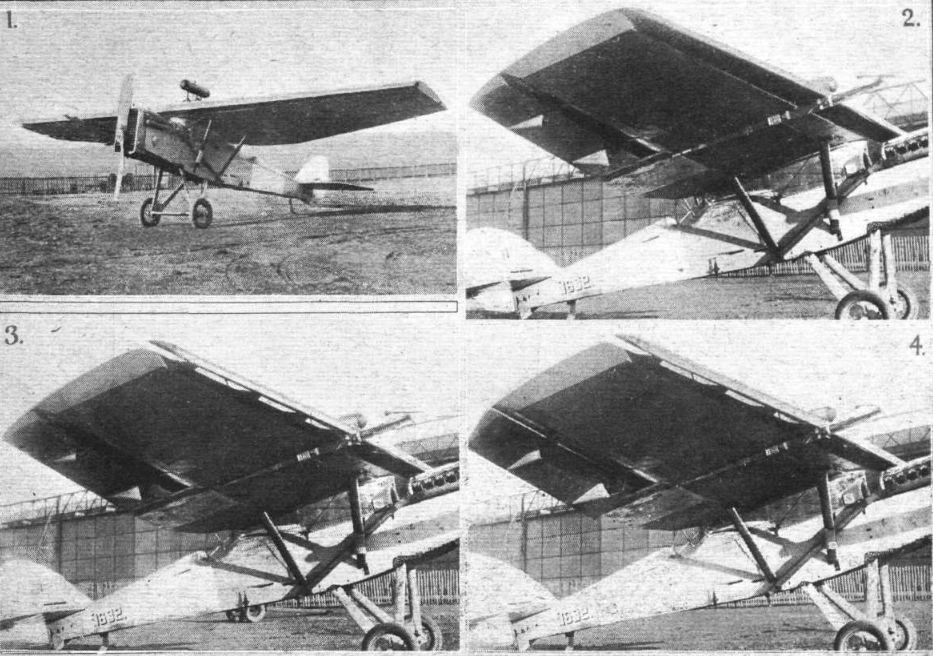
- Showing open and closed slots and depressed aileron

General information
- Type: experimental monoplane
- National origin: United Kingdom
- Manufacturer: Handley Page
- Number built: 1

History
- First flight: 24 February 1921

The Handley Page H.P.20 was an experimental monoplane modification of a de Havilland DH.9A, built to study controllable slots and slotted ailerons as high lift devices. It was the first aircraft to fly with controllable slots.

== Development ==
Frederick Handley Page obtained his master patent for controllable slots on the edge of an aircraft wing on 24 October 1919. He knew the lift coefficient of all wings increased linearly until the stall was approached, then fell away; he argued that if the stall could be delayed, higher lift coefficients could be reached. In Germany Gustav Lachmann had the same idea, though through a wish to avoid the dangers of stalling. Rather than going to litigation an agreement was reached in which Lachmann, working with Prandtl at the advanced Goettingen air tunnel acted as consultant to Handley Page. Lachmann heard about the Handley Page work when they modified a standard DH.9A with fixed slots and demonstrated it dramatically at the Handley Page airfield at Cricklewood on 21 October 1920. That machine was retrospectively designated the H.P.17. The first aircraft with pilot controllable slots, designed by Handley Page and wind tunnel tested by Lachmann was called the X.4B in the company's contemporary notation but became, retrospectively, the H.P.20. The Air Ministry met the cost.

Like the H.P.17 it used a D.H.9A engine, fuselage and empennage, but fitted with an entirely new wing. The H.P.20 was a high-wing monoplane, using a thick wing with a straight leading edge but taper on the trailing edge. It was a semi-cantilever structure bolted to a small cabane on the fuselage and braced to the lower fuselage longerons with a pair of steeply rising struts on each side. The heaviness of early cantilever wing structures is shown by a comparison of the loaded weight of the H.P.20 (6,500 lb) with that of the loaded standard biplane DH.9A (4,645 lb including fuel for over 5 hours of flight and a 460 lb bomb load). The undersurface was flat and the front edge cropped to allow the full span slats, when closed, to form the true leading edge. The slats were hinged ahead of the wing and at their leading edges; their rotation formed the slots. In addition, slots opened in front of the ailerons when they were lowered. This was done via a groove in the wing just in front of the aileron hinge, narrowing towards the top surface.

The spans and wing areas of the DH.9A and H.P.20 were about the same, so the wing chord of the monoplane was about double that of the biplane. As a result, the tailing edge extended aft beyond the DH.9A's pilot's cockpit and so the H.P.20 was flown from what had been the gunner's position. There was a small cut-out in the trailing edge to enhance the pilot's view. As there was no upper wing to house the fuel, the H.P.20 had a slightly round-ended cylindrical tank mounted high over the centre section to provide gravity feed. Because high angles of attack were used in landing and take-off with the slots open, the undercarriage was lengthened, as it had been on the H.P.17. There was an airflow direction indicator mounted on a little boom which projected forward of the starboard wing.

The H.P.20 was first flown with slots closed on 24 February 1921 at Cricklewood. About a month later it was flying with controllable slots. In one test it landed at 43 mphh (69 km/h) at a wing loading of 11 lb/ft^{2} (54 kg/m^{2}), about the same as a Cessna 152. This corresponds to a lift coefficient of 1.17. Aerodynamic loads made the slats hard to operate reliably. After manufacturer's tests, the Air Ministry agreed to take on the aircraft, but the Ministry's pilot made a heavy landing at Cricklewood during acceptance flights and the H.P.20 remained there for repairs until final delivery in February 1922.

== Specifications ==
Data from Barnes & James 1987, pp. 229

General characteristics

- Crew: 1
- Length: 30 ft 0 in (9.15 m)
- Wingspan: 47 ft 6 in (14.5 m)
- Wing area: 500 sq ft (46.4 m^{2})
- Gross weight: 6,500 lb (2,950 kg)
- Powerplant: 1 × Liberty 12-N water cooled V-12 , 400 hp (300 kW)
