= Radlett Aerodrome =

- IATA: none; ICAO: none

Summary
- Airport type: Closed
- Serves: Radlett, Hertfordshire
- Location: Hertfordshire
- Built: 1929
- In use: 1929–1970
- Elevation AMSL: 230 ft / 70 m
- Coordinates: 51.71°N 0.33°W

Map
- Location in Hertfordshire

Runways
Direction	Length		Surface
Direction	ft	m	Surface
03/21	2,106	642

Radlett Aerodrome was an airfield and Handley Page aircraft manufacturing plant in Hertfordshire, now owned by Eon Productions. Part of the airfield is now the M25 between junctions 21 (A405) and 22 (A1081).

== History ==
In the 2010s plans for the future use of the site's land were the subject of lengthy dispute but in 2020 it was agreed that it would be redeveloped as a rail freight terminal.

On 20 February 2024, the £34m sale of the remaining portion of the former Radlett Aerodrome to rail freight company Segro, which has faced opposition from campaigners, will undergo judicial review in the High Court to determine its lawfulness.

== Airshows ==
Radlett Aerodrome hosted a number of significant post-war airshows.

- 10 February 1946; a display was given in order to show the main types of British civil and military aircraft to the delegates to U.N.O. (United Nations)
- 12–13 September 1946; the first post-war Society of British Aerospace Companies (S.B.A.C.) show is held at Radlett in Hertfordshire.
- 9–12 September 1947; the Society of British Aerospace Companies show is extended to four days, with three days of flying displays. This is the last S.B.A.C. show at Radlett before it is moved to Farnborough.
- 14 September 1947; Royal Aeronautical Society Garden Party

== Structure ==
The Handley Page works were situated on the east of the former A5, then a main road into London from the Midlands. The site is between the A5 road, to the west, and the Midland Main Line, to the east. The M25 motorway crosses the entire former site from east to west.

== Accidents ==
On 25 March 1937, whilst ferrying pilots to the Handley Page factory at Radlett aerodrome, to collect new Harrow bomber aircraft, Handley Page H.P.54 Harrow K6940 clipped an express train travelling at 60 mph, ripping the roof off the kitchen car. Fortunately there were no fatalities either on board the Harrow, or the train, but the aircraft crash-landed and was written off.
