= Handley Page Hamlet =

HP.32 Hamlet
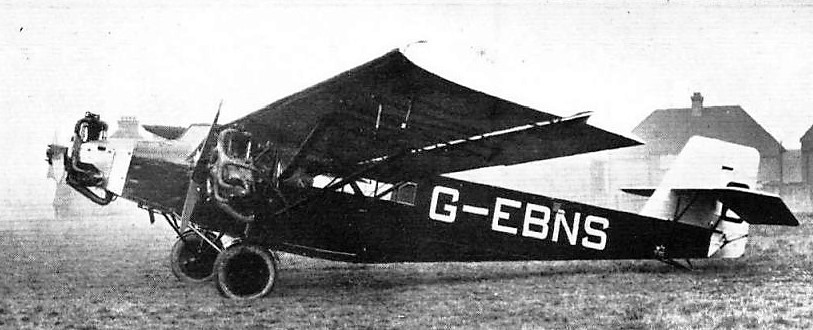

General information
- Type: Cabin monoplane
- National origin: United Kingdom
- Manufacturer: Handley Page
- Number built: 1

History
- First flight: 19 October 1926
- Retired: 1929

The Handley Page HP.32 Hamlet was a British six-passenger monoplane transport designed and built by Handley Page. Only one was built to order of the Air Ministry, first flown with three-engines, later changed to two then back to three engines.

== Development ==
In 1924, the British Air Ministry issued Specification 23/24 for a three-engined six/seven-passenger charter airliner. Handley Page's design to meet this requirement, the Hamlet, was a high-wing three-engined monoplane with a conventional landing gear and room for six passengers. The wing was fitted with leading edge slots and flaps to give good landing performance. The only Hamlet was built at Cricklewood in 1926, and registered G-EBNS. It was first flown on 19 October 1926 powered by three 120 hp (90 kW) Bristol Lucifer IV three-cylinder radial engines. The Lucifer gave rise to excessive vibration, particularly in the centre engine, causing the pilot's instruments to be unreadable, and after a final flight with Lucifer engines on 25 October 1926, it was modified with a smaller fin and larger rudder and the engines were changed to two 250 hp (187 kW) Armstrong Siddeley Lynx radial engines, with the nose engine replaced by additional baggage space, first flying in this form on 19 May 1927. This modification eliminated the vibration, but the twin-engined variant was underpowered. In March 1928 it was re-engined again with three 150 hp (112 kW) Armstrong Siddeley Mongoose five-cylinder radial engines although it flew only once in that configuration on delivery to the Royal Aircraft Establishment at Farnborough. The aircraft was scrapped in 1929.

== Specifications (Lynx-powered) ==
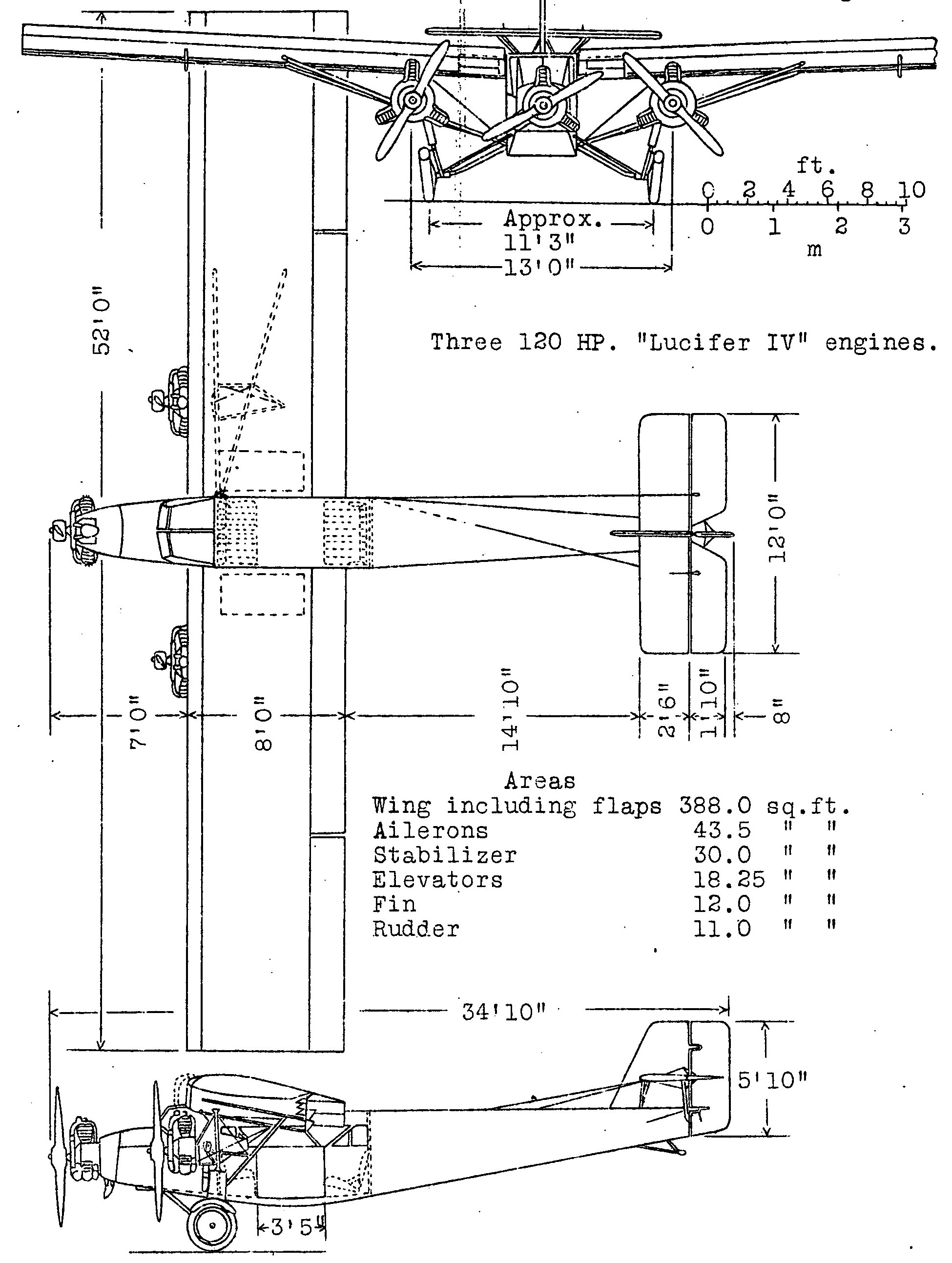
Handley Page Hamlet 3-view drawing from NACA Aircraft Circular No.20

Data from

General characteristics

- Crew: two
- Capacity: six passengers
- Length: 34 ft 10 in (10.62 m)
- Wingspan: 52 ft 0 in (15.85 m)
- Empty weight: 3,105 lb (1,408 kg)
- Gross weight: 5,000 lb (2,268 kg)
- Powerplant: 2 × Armstrong Siddeley Lynx radial , 220 hp (164 kW) each

Performance

- Maximum speed: 114 mph (183 km/h, 99 kn)
