= Handley Page Type L =

L/200

General information
- Type: Long-range aircraft
- National origin: United Kingdom
- Manufacturer: Handley Page
- Status: Incomplete prototype

The Handley Page L/200 was the internal designation for a biplane aircraft by Handley Page, conceived to compete for the Daily Mail £10,000 prize for the first nonstop air crossing of the Atlantic. One prototype was designed and built in 1914 at the order of Prince Ludwig of Löwenstein-Wertheim.

The L/200 designation came from its 200 hp (150 kW) Salmson 2M.7 engine, but the engine was requisitioned by the Admiralty when it arrived from France, so although the aircraft had been substantially built it was never finally assembled or flown. It was offered to the Admiralty as a coastal defence aircraft, with variants designated M/200 and MS/200 (seaplane) based on the more readily available sub-100 hp (80 kW) engines, but these were not ordered as the Admiralty had already placed contracts for a seaplane for these duties.

The plans for the L/200 had been lost by the time of the Commission on Awards to Inventors in February 1920, and no photographs remained.

== Specifications (weights and performance estimated) ==
Data from Handley Page Aircraft since 1907

General characteristics

- Crew: two
- Length: 41 ft (12 m)
- Wingspan: 60 ft (18 m)
- Wing area: 900 sq ft (84 m^{2})
- Empty weight: 2,800 lb (1,270 kg)
- Gross weight: 6,000 lb (2,722 kg)
- Powerplant: 1 × Salmson (Canton-Unné) 2M.7 14-cyl. two-row water cooled radial engine, 200 hp (150 kW)

Performance

- Cruise speed: 80 mph (130 km/h, 70 kn)
- Stall speed: 46 mph (74 km/h, 40 kn)
- Endurance: 23 hours at 80 mph (130 km/h)
