= Handley Page Type F =

Type F (H.P.6)
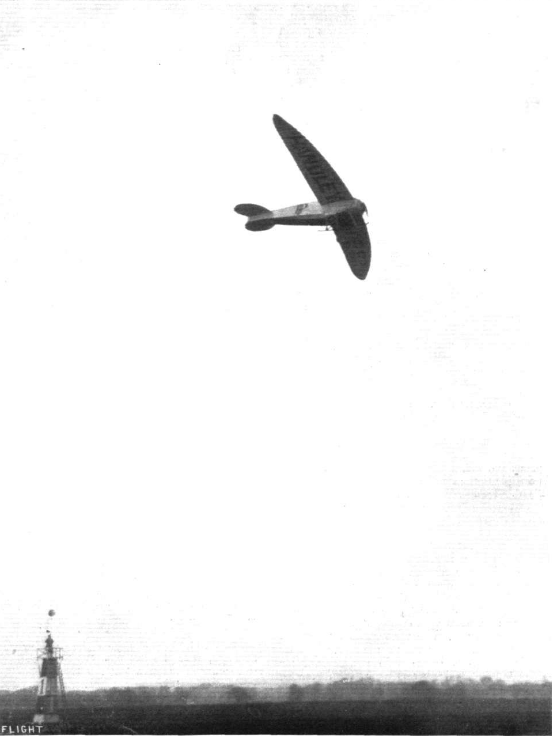
- Over Hendon, 17 November 1912

General information
- Type: Military two seater
- National origin: United Kingdom
- Manufacturer: Handley Page
- Designer: Frederick Handley Page
- Number built: 1

History
- First flight: 21 August 1912

The Handley Page Type F was a two-seat, single-engined monoplane designed to compete for a War Office prize for a specified military machine in 1912. It crashed before the trials got under way and, although it flew well later, only one was built.

== Design and development ==
In layout and general appearance the Type F was similar to the earlier Type D and its contemporary, the Type E. Like them, the wings of the Type F had a strongly curved leading edge and a straight but swept-back trailing edge. They were wire braced above and below with the upper wires attached to a four-strut pyramidal pylon above the cockpit and below to the undercarriage structure, which was very similar to that of the Type E. Lateral control was by wing warping; the outer 40% of each wing was relatively flexible and could be twisted by wires running from the cockpit via the pylon to kingposts at 60% span. The Type F did not have the chord extensions seen on the outer parts of the Type E's wings.

The Type F had a deep rectangular cross-section fuselage, narrowing to the rear, with fairings above and below for streamlining. The 70 hp (52 kW) Gnome rotary engine was completely enclosed in a snub-nosed cowling. The two crew sat side by side, as the military specification required, in an open cockpit at mid-wing. The observer, sitting on the left had a downward view through a windowed hatch. Elsewhere the aircraft was fabric-covered. The tailplane had a circular leading edge curving though a little more than 180° and carried split elevators with scalloped trailing edges. There was no fixed fin, only a rudder of irregular six-sided (five of them concave) shape. It had a tailskid formed from a pair of cane hoops.

In August 1912 it was taken, untested, from the factory at Barking (it was the last Handley Page aircraft built there) to the military trials at Larkhill. It flew there for the first time on 21 August, coping with the windy conditions quite well though showing the side-to-side wallowing that had also been experienced with the Type E before its wing warping lateral control was replaced by ailerons. The next day the engine failed soon after takeoff and a wing and the undercarriage were seriously damaged in the resulting crosswind landing. The Type F was withdrawn from the trials and returned to the new factory at Cricklewood for repairs. It was in the air again in early November, flown with enthusiasm with a variety of passengers by Wilfred Parke on most days. The Type F was lost on 15 December 1912 when engine failure led to the death of Parke and his passenger, Alfred Arkell Hardwick. In the retrospective type redesignation of 1924, the Type F became the H.P.6.

== Specifications ==
Data from Barnes & James 1987, pp. 63

General characteristics

- Crew: two
- Length: 30 ft 2 in (9.2 m)
- Wingspan: 43 ft 6 in (13.7 m)
- Height: 10 ft 6 in (3.2 m)
- Wing area: 250 sq ft (23.2 m^{2})
- Empty weight: 850 lb (386 kg)
- Gross weight: 1,450 lb (657 kg)
- Powerplant: 1 × Gnome rotary , 70 hp (52 kW)

Performance

- Maximum speed: 55 mph (88 km/h, 48 kn)
