= Wilfred Parke =

British aviator (1889–1912)

- Born: 1889
- Died: 1912 (aged 22–23); Wembley, London
- Military career
- Allegiance: United Kingdom
- Branch: Royal Navy
- Service years: 1905–1912
- Rank: Lieutenant

Lieutenant Wilfred Parke RN (1889–1912) was a British flight instructor who was the first pilot to make an observed recovery from a spin.

== Family ==
Parke was the son of Alfred Watlington Parke, the Rector of Uplyme, and Hilda Fort, and the grandson of Charles Joseph Parke.

== Career ==
Parke became a midshipman in the Royal Navy in September 1905, was promoted to sub-lieutenant in 1908 and lieutenant in 1910. He had his first flying lesson at the Avro school at Brooklands on Sunday 11 April 1911. At that time dual-control instruction was almost unknown, and Parke was in sole charge of the aircraft, in which he had been told to try taxying. To the surprise of all, he opened the throttle, and made series of short hops, managing to land successfully. The following Wednesday Parke, at his third attempt, succeeded in flying a half-circle in a stiff breeze, landing with minor damage to the undercarriage. The following Monday he successfully took the test for his pilot's licence in a Bristol Boxkite, and was awarded Royal Aero Club flying license no.73, awarded in a RAeC meeting that also awarded licenses to the pioneer naval aviators C. R. Samson and Arthur Longmore.

In October 1911 he was taken on as a demonstrator and instructor by the Grahame-White flying school at Hendon, doing this when not engaged on naval duties. In May 1912 he was posted to HMS Actaeon (part of the Royal Navy's torpedo school HMS Vernon) as an officer of the Naval Wing of the R.F.C.

In August 1912 he was the pilot of the Avro G cabin biplane which had been entered in the British Military Aeroplane Competition taking place at Larkhill Aerodrome on Salisbury Plain. On the morning of August 25 he had carried out a three-hour endurance trial, accompanied by Lieut. Le Breton, R.F.C., and was approaching the aerodrome in order to land. When flying upwind an altitude of about 650 feet (200 m), Parke entered a spiral gliding approach and closed the throttle without switching the engine off. Having turned though a half circle and now more or less flying into wind, Parke thought the aircraft was too nose-up and also insufficiently banked for the turn he was making. He therefore applied up elevator and possibly applied the wing warping control, and at once the aircraft entered a spin.

Parke attempted to recover from the spin by increasing engine speed, pulling back on the stick, and turning into the spin, with no effect. The aircraft descended 450 feet (140 m), and observers braced themselves for a fatal crash. Parke was disabled by centrifugal forces but was still considering a means of escape. In an effort to neutralize the forces pinning him against the right side of the cockpit, he applied full right rudder, and the aircraft levelled out fifty feet above the ground. With the aircraft now under control, Parke climbed, made another approach, and landed safely.

The British pilot F. P. Raynham had already made a successful recovery from a spin, but the event was unobserved.

In spite of the discovery of "Parke's technique," also known as the "Parke Dive", pilots were not taught spin-recovery procedures until the beginning of World War I.

== Death ==
Parke was killed a few months later on 15 December 1912 when the Handley Page monoplane in which he was flying from Hendon to Oxford crashed at Wembley, also killing his passenger Alfred Hardwick, the manager of Handley Page. The accident was caused by loss of engine power, combined with the loss of airspeed caused by turning, exacerbated by the wind disturbances due to the local topography, especially the presence of a belt of trees on the windward side of a ridge.

There is a stained glass window dedicated to his memory in Uplyme parish church.
