= Handley Page Limited =

Former British aerospace manufacturer

- Industry: Aviation
- Founded: 17 June 1909
- Founder: Frederick Handley Page
- Defunct: March 1970
- Fate: Voluntary liquidation
- Successor: Scottish Aviation
- Headquarters: Cricklewood Aerodrome, Radlett Aerodrome
- Key people: Hedley Hazelden, Charles Joy, Gustav Lachmann, Godfrey Lee, Reginald Stafford, George Volkert
- Subsidiaries: Handley Page Transport (until 1924)

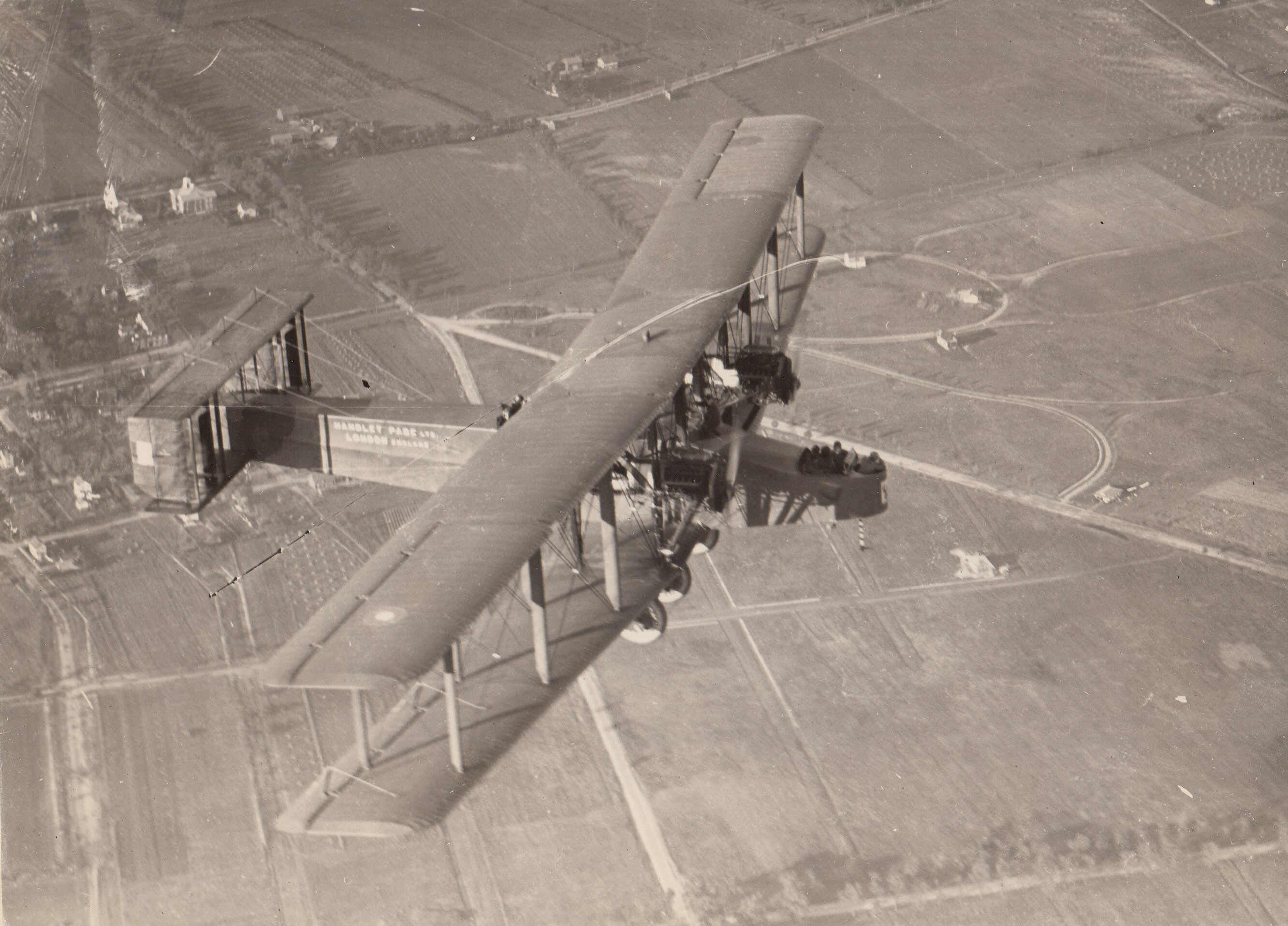
Atlantic in flight, non-stop from New York to Chicago, 1919

Handley Page Limited was a British aerospace manufacturer. Founded by Frederick Handley Page (later Sir Frederick) in 1909, it was the United Kingdom's first publicly traded aircraft manufacturing company. It went into voluntary liquidation and ceased to exist in 1970. The company, based at Radlett Aerodrome in Hertfordshire, was noted for its pioneering role in aviation history and for producing heavy bombers and large airliners.

== History ==
Handley Page Ltd was registered as a private limited company on 17 June 1909 for the purpose of aeronautical engineering and the design and manufacture of aircraft..

In 1912, Handley Page established an aircraft factory at Cricklewood after moving from Barking. Aircraft were built there, and flown from the company's adjacent airfield known as Cricklewood Aerodrome, which was later used by Handley Page Transport. The factory was later sold off to Oswald Stoll and converted into Britain's largest film studio, Cricklewood Studios.

=== World War I ===
During the First World War, Handley Page produced a series of heavy bombers for the Royal Navy to bomb the German Zeppelin yards, with the ultimate intent of bombing Berlin in revenge for the Zeppelin attacks on London. Handley Page had been asked by the Admiralty to produce a "bloody paralyser of an aeroplane". These aircraft included the O/100 of 1915, the O/400 of 1918 and the four-engined V/1500 with the range to reach Berlin. The V/1500 had only just entered operational service as the war ended in 1918.

The Handley Page factory at Radlett Aerodrome employed women as part of the war effort, and was visited by royalty.

=== Interwar period ===
In early 1919, a Handley Page V/1500 aircraft, dubbed Atlantic, was shipped to Newfoundland to attempt the world's first non-stop Transatlantic flight; only to be beaten by a Vickers Vimy piloted by Alcock and Brown in June of that year. The Atlantic flew into New York City via Canada on 9 October 1919, carrying the first airmail from Canada to the United States of America.

In the immediate postwar years, Handley Page modified some O/400's for passenger use, which they flew on the London-Paris route as Handley Page Transport. The V/1500 was considered too large to be practical at the time, but many design features of the V/1500 were later incorporated into an O/400 airframe to produce their first dedicated passenger design, the W.8 that led to a series of similar airliners, fitted with two or three engines, which, aside from being used by Handley Page Transport, were also exported to Belgium.

In 1924 Handley Page Transport merged with two other airlines to create Imperial Airways, as the UK's national airline service, which continued to use a number of the W.8, W.9 and W.10 series of airliners. Handley Page continued to develop large biplane airliners, including the luxurious Handley Page H.P.42, for use on Imperial routes to Africa and India.

Handley Page developed the Handley Page Slat (or slot), an auxiliary airfoil mounted ahead and above the wing, which formed a narrow gap which improved airflow at high angles of attack and improved low-speed handling. The leading edge slat was simultaneously designed by the German aerodynamicist Gustav Lachmann, who was later employed by Handley Page. The design was so successful that licensing fees to other companies were their main source of income in the early 1920s.

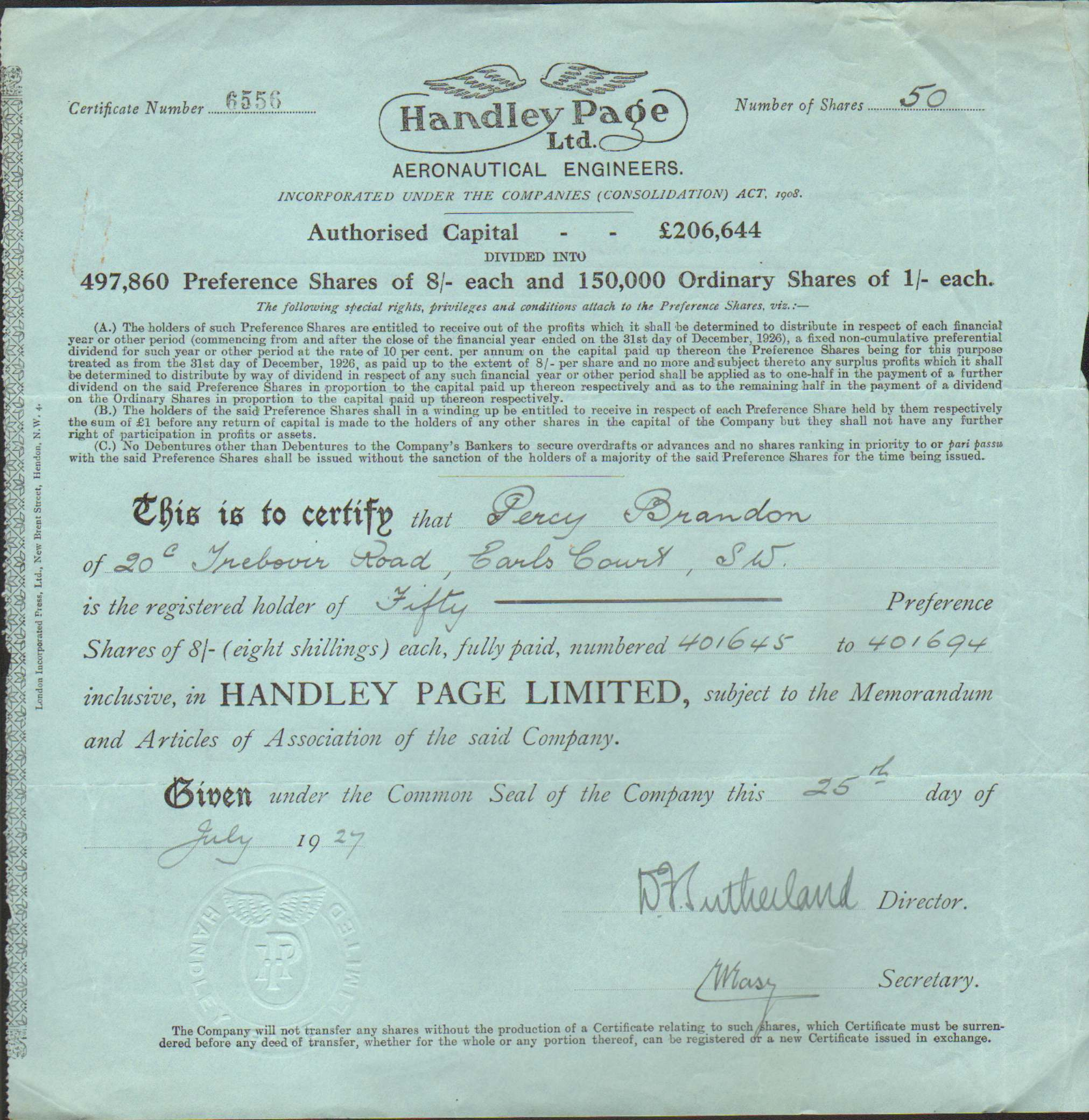
HP preference share certificate, 1927

In 1929, Cricklewood Aerodrome was closed and Handley Page moved the aircraft final assembly to Radlett Aerodrome. Cricklewood Aerodrome was taken over by Cricklewood Studios, the largest film studio in the UK at that time. Manufacture of aircraft parts and sub-assemblies continued until 1964 at Cricklewood when the remainder of the site was sold off and a Wickes home renovation store currently occupies the site.

=== World War II ===
With the Second World War looming, Handley Page designed and produced the HP.52 Hampden bomber, which took part in the first British raid on Berlin.

In response to a 1936 government request for heavier, longer ranged aircraft, Handley Page tendered the HP.56 design powered by twin Rolls-Royce Vultures and this was ordered, along with what became the Avro Manchester. However the Vulture proved so troublesome that – years before the engine was abandoned by Rolls-Royce in 1940 – the Air Staff decided that the HP.56 should be fitted with four engines instead. Therefore, before reaching the prototype stage, the HP.56 design was reworked into the four-engined HP.57 Halifax. The Halifax became the second most-prolific British heavy bomber of the war after the Avro Lancaster (itself essentially a four-engine development of the Manchester). Although in some respects (such as crew survivability) better than the Lancaster, the Halifax suffered in terms of altitude performance and was redeployed toward the end of the war as a heavy transport and glider tug, with several variants being specifically built as such, including the HP.70 Halton.

=== Postwar ===
After the war, the British Government sought tenders for jet bombers to carry the nation's nuclear deterrent. The three types produced were known as the V-Bombers, and Handley Page's contribution was the HP.80 Victor, a four-engined, crescent-winged design. This aircraft remained in service (as a tanker aircraft) well beyond the demise of the company which created it.

In 1947 Handley Page bought some of the assets of the bankrupt Miles Aircraft company. These assets include existing designs, tools and jigs, most notably for the Miles M.52 supersonic research aircraft, and the Miles site at Woodley, near Reading. The operation was named Handley Page (Reading) Ltd, a company constituted to buy and operate the assets formed out of the inactive Handley Page Transport Ltd. The most significant of the inherited designs became the Herald airliner. Designs from the Reading site used the initials HPR ("Handley Page (Reading)").

=== Demise ===
Unlike other large British aircraft manufacturers, Handley Page resisted the government's pressure to merge into larger entities. By the late 1960s, the British aviation industry was dominated by two companies: Hawker Siddeley and the British Aircraft Corporation.

Unable to compete for government orders or build large commercial aircraft, Handley Page produced its final notable Handley Page design, the Jetstream. This was a small turboprop-powered commuter aircraft, with a pressurised cabin and a passenger capacity of 12 to 18. It was designed primarily for the United States "feederliner" market.

Although successful, Jetstream was too late to save Handley Page, and the company went into voluntary liquidation in March 1970 and was wound up after 61 years trading under the same name. The Jetstream lived on, the design being purchased and produced by Scottish Aviation at Prestwick, continuing after the company was bought by British Aerospace in 1977.

== Sites ==
Site of Cricklewood Factory
OS Grid Reference:	TQ240862
Site of Radlett Aerodrome
OS Grid Reference:	TL155038

Radlett Aerodrome was opened in 1929 as a grass aerodrome for Handley Page Civil Aircraft. Its runway was extended in 1939 to enable production of Halifax bombers. By the time of its closure the airfield had two runways:

- 03/21 approximately 7,000 feet (2,100 m)
- 15/33 approximately 2,500 feet (760 m)

Most of the towers, hangars and runways were demolished in the 1970s after the Company was terminated. The M25 Motorway now runs on the south side of the site, with Lafarge Aggregates now owning the remainder. The runway surface was removed and replaced with grass, but a shadow remains when viewed from the air.

The aerodrome was used in the 1962 film, The Iron Maiden.

== Products ==
=== Designations ===
Handley Page originally used a letter sequence to designate types (i.e. A, B, C etc.). Beginning with the model E, the letter was used in combination with a slash and a number that referred to the installed horsepower, at least initially. However the 100 in O/100 indicated the type's 100-foot wingspan, while other designs it may or may not have been meaningful other than as a design sequence. By 1923, the company had come to the end of the alphabet and had begun reusing earlier letters, but this would have become confusing, so from 1924 they assigned the letters HP and a sequential number to indicate the model, with previous aircraft being retroactively assigned numbers in the new sequence, starting with the Type A as the HP.1. Thus the O/400 became the HP.16 and the W.8 the HP.18. Unbuilt projects were skipped from this sequence.

When the assets of Miles Aircraft were taken over, the latter's Reading design office used HPR for Handley Page Reading, followed by a number as with the HPR.1 Marathon.

=== Designs ===
==== First letter designation sequence (pre-1924) ====
- Type A – 1909-1910 "Bluebird" monoplane
- Type B – 1909 biplane
- Type C – 1910 monoplane, did not fly; rebuilt from Type A
- Type D – 1911 "Antiseptic" monoplane
- Type E – 1912 E/50 "Antiseptic" monoplane
- Type F – 1912 F/70 military monoplane with side by side seating
- Type G – 1913 G/100 crescent-wing biplane
- Type H – 1913 H/70 and H/110 monoplane projects, developments of type E & F
- Type I – not assigned
- Type J - possibly a bomber
- Type K – 1913 K/35 biplane project, scaled down type G
- Type L – 1914 L/200 transatlantic biplane, never flew; scaled up Type K
- Type M – 1914 M/200 coastal defense biplane project; land/seaplane derivative of L/200
  - Type MS/200 – 1914 seaplane derivative project of M/200
- Type N – 1914 N/80 biplane project
- Type O – 1915-1920 twin-engine O/100 & O/400 bombers and O/7, O/10 & O/11 airliners
- Type P – 1916 P/320 biplane (later triplane) shipboard scout project
- Type Q – not assigned
- Type R – 1917 R/200 landplane/seaplane reconnaissance-fighter to Spec. N.2B
- Type S – 1917 S/400 flying boat project, derivative of O/400
- Type T – 1917 T/400 flying boat project; military flying boat derivative of O/400
- Type T – 1922 Hanley biplane carrier torpedo bomber
- Type Ta – 1924 Hendon biplane carrier torpedo-bomber
- Type U – not assigned
- Type V – V/1500, 1918 four engine heavy bomber
- Type W – W/400 (later W/4), 1919 airliner; transport derivative of O/400
- Type X – X/4, Airco DH.9A fitted with slotted monoplane wing
- Type Y – not assigned
- Type Z – not assigned

==== Second letter designation sequence (1923) ====
- Type C/7 Handcross – 1924 biplane day bomber, letter reused
- Type D/4 – HP.29 biplane transport project
- Type D – HP.32 Hamlet
- Type E – HP.31 Harrow
- Type F – HP.37 shipboard fighter project to Spec. O.22/26
- Type H – HP.34 Hare
- Type M – HP.36 Hinaidi II

==== Numerical designations (1924–1970) ====
- HP.1 – Type A monoplane
- HP.2 – Type B biplane
- HP.3 – Type C monoplane, never flew; rebuilt from HP.1
- HP.4 – Type D monoplane
- HP.5 – Type E monoplane
- HP.6 – Type F monoplane
- HP.7 – Type G biplane
- HP.8 – Type L biplane, never flew
- HP.9 – Type M coastal defense aircraft project
- HP.10 – Type N biplane scout project
- HP.11 – O/100 twin-engine bomber
- HP.12 – O/400 twin-engine bomber
- HP.13 – Type P biplane (later triplane) shipboard scout project
- HP.14 – Type R prototype naval reconnaissance aircraft
- HP.15 – V/1500 "Super Handley" four-engine bomber
- HP.16 – W/400 airliner
- HP.17 – Airco DH.9 fitted with wing slots
- HP.18 Hamilton – W/8 airliner
- HP.19 Hanley – torpedo bomber
- HP.20 – Airco DH.9A fitted with slotted monoplane wing
- HP.21 – Type S monoplane fighter for US Navy
- HP.22 – single-seat sport monoplane for Lympne light aircraft trials
- HP.23 – single-seat sport monoplane for Lympne light aircraft trials
- HP.24 Hyderabad – biplane heavy bomber
- HP.25 Hendon – torpedo bomber
- HP.26 Hamilton – W/8 airliner
- HP.27 Hampstead – W/9 airliner
- HP.28 Handcross – biplane day bomber
- HP.29 – D/4 biplane transport project
- HP.30 – W/10 airliner
- HP.31 Harrow – carrier-based torpedo bomber and reconnaissance aircraft
- HP.32 Hamlet – six-passenger monoplane airliner
- HP.33 Hinaidi I and Clive I – heavy bomber & transport
- HP.34 Hare – high-altitude day bomber
- HP.35 Clive II – heavy bomber
- HP.36 Hinaidi II – twin-engine bomber
- HP.37 – shipboard fighter project to Spec. O.22/26
- HP.38 Heyford – prototype biplane heavy night bomber
- HP.39 Gugnunc – experimental STOL/safety biplane
- HP.40 – biplane seaplane project for Japan for 3MR5 design
- HP.41 – biplane torpedo bomber project to Spec. M.5/28; joint tender with Blackburn
- HP.42 – eastern biplane airliner
- HP.43 – three-engine biplane bomber transport to Spec. C.16/28; later rebuilt as HP.51
- HP.44 Hinaidi III – twin-engine bomber; proposed re-engining of HP.36
- HP.45 – western biplane airliner
- HP.46 – biplane torpedo bomber to Spec. M.1/30
- HP.47 – general purpose monoplane to Spec. G.4/31
- HP.48 – reserved but not used
- HP.49 – reserved but not used
- HP.50 Heyford – production variant, biplane heavy night bomber
- HP.51 – prototype monoplane bomber-transport to Spec. C.26/31
- HP.52 Hampden I – medium bomber
- HP.53 – bomber project for Sweden, led to the HP.53 Hereford
- HP.54 Harrow – bomber-transport
- HP.55 – twin-engine heavy bomber design to Spec. B.1/35
- HP.56 – twin-engine heavy bomber design to Spec. P.13/36
- HP.57 Halifax Mk.I – four-engine heavy bomber
- HP.58 Halifax Mk.II – four-engine heavy bomber project; cancelled due to armament problems, name transferred to HP.59
- HP.59 Halifax Mk.II – four-engine heavy bomber
- HP.60 Halifax Mk.IV – heavy bomber project for B.1/39, not built
- HP.61 Halifax Mk.III – four-engine heavy bomber
- HP.62 Hampden II – medium bomber
- HP.63 Halifax V – four-engine heavy bomber
- HP.64 Halifax transport – airliner to Spec. C.15/43
- HP.65 Halifax IV "Super-Halifax" – project with low drag 113 ft (34 m) wing, turbo supercharged Hercules engines.
- HP.66 Hastings B.I and B.II – Halifax project to Spec. B.27/43, provisional name, abandoned at end of war.
- HP.67 Hastings C1 and C2 – military transport
- HP.68 Hermes I – airliner
- HP.69 Hastings B.II – Halifax project with turbo-blower exhaust Hercules 100, provisional name. Order cancelled 1944
- HP.70 Halifax C.VIII & Halton – transport & airliner
- HP.71 Halifax A.IX – paratroop transport/glider tug
- HP.72 – military transport project to Spec. C.15/45
- HP.72A – four-engine swept wing jet bomber project; led to HP.80 Victor
- HP.73 Hastings C.III – transport project
- HP.74 Hermes II – airliner developed from the HP.68 Hermes I
- HP.75 Manx – tailless research aircraft for possible transport, bomber and fighter aircraft projects.
- HP.75A – unarmed high-speed swept wing jet bomber project; led to and eclipsed by the HP.72A
- HP.76 – 34 passenger, twin turboprop airliner to Brabazon 2B
- HP.77 – as HP.76 but with two Bristol Theseus engines to Brabazon 2B
- HP.78 – four-engine turboprop airliner project to Brabazon 2B; four-engine derivative of HP.76
- HP.79 Hermes III – four-engine turboprop airliner project; originally designated HP.74
- HP.80 Victor – four-engine bomber to Spec. B.35/46
- HP.81 Hermes IV – airliner
- HP.82 Hermes V – airliner
- HP.83 – Hermes airliner to Spec. C.2/47 (Brabazon III) with four Bristol Hercules 663 engines
- HP.84 – airliner to Spec. C.2/47
- HP.85 – Hermes airliner to Spec. C.2/47 with two Bristol Proteus coupled turboprops and single-spar wing
- HP.86 – Hermes airliner to Spec. C.2/47 with four Bristol Hercules 663 engines and single-spar wing
- HP.87 – 1/3 scale radio-controlled Victor glider
- HP.88 – Victor research aircraft, wings and tail on Supermarine Attacker
- HP.89 Hastings VI – transport project
- HP.90 Hermes IA – project civil combi freighter
- HP.91 Hermes VI – lightened Hermes IA project
- HP.92 Hermes VII – as HP.91 but with four Rolls-Royce Merlin engines
- HP.93 – Dufaylite wing for Miles Messenger
- HP.94 Hastings C.4 – VIP transport project to Spec. C.115P
- HP.95 Hastings C.3 – transport for RNZAF
- HP.96 – Victor military transport project
- HP.97 – Victor civil airliner project
- HP.98 – Victor target-marker project
- HP.99 – "Daisy Cutter" low-level bomber project
- HP.100 – long-range, high-speed reconnaissance-bomber to Spec. OR.330
- HP.101 – proposed military version of HP.97
- HP.102 – boundary level control airliner; superseded by HP.108
- HP.103 – BLC conversion of Jet Provost
- HP.104 – phase 3 Victor bomber project
- HP.105 – BLC military transport to Spec. C.132D
- HP.106 – missile design studies
- HP.107 – supersonic bomber project to Spec. OR.330
- HP.108 – four-engine jetliner, rival to Boeing 707
- HP.109 – supersonic transport project
- HP.110 – supersonic transport project
- HP.111 – strategic jet transport/freighter project, partially based on Victor
- HP.111C – civil version of HP.111
- HP.112 – "Flying Jeep" project; eclipsed by HP.118
- HP.113 – "laminarized" 12-seat commuter project
- HP.114 – phase 6 Victor bomber project
- HP.115 – low speed delta wing research aircraft
- HP.116 – tactical freighter studies
- HP.117 – 200-300 passenger flying wing airliner project
- HP.118 – VTOL "Jumping Jeep" project; eclipsed by HP.120
- HP.119 – 3/10 scale model for HP.117
- HP.120 – 2-man VTOL convertible "Jumping Jeep" project
- HP.121 – not used to avoid confusion with de Havilland DH.121
- HP.122 – VTOL transport project to Spec. OR.351
- HP.123 – HP.111-based BLC military tactical transport project to Spec. OR.351
- HP.124 – Military Herald project
- HP.125 – tactical VTOL variant of HP.124 to NATO requirement NMBR-4
- HP.126 – All-Wing Aerobus 100 passenger airliner
- HP.127 – Jet Herald feederliner development
- HP.128 – short-range supersonic transport project
- HP.129 – Mini Herald 30 passenger feederliner
- HP.130 – BLC conversion of HS.125
- HP.131 – improved HP.124 with ramp; offered to Belgium in 1965 along with HP.132 and HP.133
- HP.132 – STOL variant of HP.131
- HP.133 – STOL variant of HP.131; offered to Belgium Air Force in 1965, but rejected
- HP.134 – Ogee Aerobus high-speed airliner
- HP.135 – high-wing laminar-flow military transport
- HP.136 – not used to avoid confusion with de Havilland DH.136
- HP.137 Jetstream – twin-turboprop light transport aircraft

==== Handley Page (Reading) designs ====
- HPR.1 Marathon – 1948 Miles M.60 transport
- HPR.1 (II) – 1950 Basic Trainer derivative project
- HPR.2 Basic Trainer – 1950 basic trainer to Spec. T.16/48
- HPR.3 Herald – 1952 airliner prototype; converted to Dart Herald standard
- HPR.4 Herald – projected production version of HPR.3
- HPR.4 (II) – 1953 projected turboprop derivative of HPR.3
- HPR.5 Marathon (I) – 1949 Miles M.69 Marathon II test bed conversion
- HPR.5 Marathon (II) – 1953 Miles M.69 T.II navigation trainers
- HPR.6 – 1955 short-range high-density airliner project
- HPR.7 Dart Herald – 1957 turboprop airliner
- HPR.8 – 1959 car ferry project based on Dart Herald

== See also ==
- Aerospace industry in the United Kingdom
- Norman Thompson Flight Company
- Hedley Hazelden – Handley Page test pilot
