= Handley Page Type D =

Type D (H.P.4)
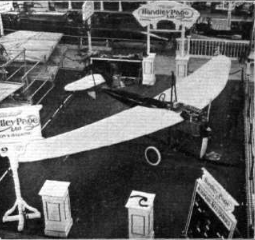
- With Green engine at the Third International Aero Show, Olympia, April 1911

General information
- Type: Experimental monoplane
- National origin: United Kingdom
- Manufacturer: Handley Page
- Designer: Frederick Handley Page
- Number built: 1

History
- First flight: 15 July 1910

The Handley Page Type D or H.P.4 was a single-seat, single-engined tractor monoplane, the first Handley Page design to fly for more than a few hops. Only one was built.

== Development ==
The Type D was the third and last of Handley Page's early single-seat monoplanes (the Type B being a biplane). It was a close relative of the Type A, which crashed on its first turn, and the Type C which did not fly at all. Like them the Type D used the wing patented by José Weiss that promised, but failed to deliver, automatic lateral stability. Its structure was based on a rigid inner section, built with four spars and standard ribs with a flexible outer section carried on ribs attached fanwise from the end of the spars in a bird-like fashion. The wing was braced by wires from a tall, narrow inverted V kingpost, lifting loads being carried by symmetrical bracing to a matching V post under the fuselage. This latter structure also carried the two-wheel single axle undercarriage and a long central skid to prevent nosing over and to hold the tail clear of the ground. After the Type A crash, Handley Page had added wing warping for lateral control to the Type C. The Type D also used this system, with a steering wheel pulling on wires to the mid-wing via the kingpost. The horizontal tail was an approximately 60° delta with rounded tips; most of the surface moved to form the single-piece elevator and carried the rudder post and split (above and below the elevator) rudder, so that all the control surfaces moved together as a cruciform piece. The elevator was operated by pushing or pulling the lever-mounted steering wheel and the rudder by a "foot tiller". There was no fixed fin.

The Type D was built for the 1911 Olympia Aero Show and appeared there with a borrowed 35 hp (26 kW) liquid-cooled Green engine mounted tractor fashion in a semi-monocoque mahogany planked fuselage. This engine was not powerful enough to get the Type D into the air and a new canvas covered fuselage had to be built to house the 50 hp (37 kW) Isaacson from the Type C.

It was entered into the Daily Mail Circuit of Britain race, starting on 22 July 1911 but crashed at the end of its first flight on 15 July. Appearing after repairs in yellow varnish, it was named The Antiseptic by Handley Page's new test pilot, Edward Petre, after the tincture of iodine commonly used on cuts in those days. In the Handley Page factory at Barking, north east London it was often called the Yellow Peril after the current nickname for Gold Flake cigarettes. It flew several times from a rented part of a sports field at Fairlop, six miles north of Barking, before Handley Page decided to concentrate on two-seaters with better sales prospects. Nonetheless, the Type D was the first Handley Page designed aircraft to fly successfully. In the retrospective redesignations of 1924 the Type D became the H.P.4.

== Specifications (Isaacson) ==
Data from Barnes & James 1987, p. 54

General characteristics

- Crew: one
- Length: 32 ft 0 in (6.71 m)
- Wingspan: 32 ft 0 in (9.76 m)
- Wing area: 156 sq ft (14.5 m^{2})
- Empty weight: 440 lb (199 kg)
- Gross weight: 620 lb (281 kg)
- Powerplant: 1 × Isaacson 5-cylinder air-cooled radial , 50 hp (37 kW)

Performance

- Maximum speed: 50 mph (80 km/h, 43 kn)
