= Gustav Lachmann =

German aeronautical engineer

Gustav Victor Lachmann (3 February 1896 – 30 May 1966) was a German aeronautical engineer who spent most of his professional life working for the British aircraft company Handley Page. He was, with Frederick Handley Page, the co-inventor of the leading edge slot.

== Early life ==
Lachmann was born in Dresden, Germany, in 1896, the younger son of Gustav Anton Lachmann, an Austrian industrialist, and his wife, Leopoldine Wilvonseder. He served as a lieutenant in the German Army cavalry during World War I before transferring to the flying corps in 1917 and training as a pilot. During flight training he stalled and crashed, breaking his jaw.

While hospitalised, he turned his mind to the cause of his crash. He concluded that a series of small aerofoils contained within a normal wing section would possess improved low-speed characteristics. He rigged up a primitive flow-visualisation rig using a fan and cigarette smoke to confirm his ideas. He attempted to patent the principle, but the application was initially rejected by the German Patent Office on the basis that there was no proof that it would work. Lachmann gave up the idea and enrolled at Darmstadt Technical University, for a course in mechanical engineering and aerodynamics. He graduated in June 1921 and took a job with the Opel factory.

By chance, he read an account of Frederick Handley Page's public demonstration of leading-edge slots given at Cricklewood on 21 October 1921. This encouraged him to renew his patent application. He borrowed DM 1000 from his mother to pay for wind-tunnel tests, to be undertaken by Ludwig Prandtl at Göttingen University and the patent was retrospectively granted as DE 347884. This gave his patent priority over those of Handley Page, but a meeting between the two men settled the matter to mutual advantage, the patent rights being shared, and Lachmann being hired as a consultant by Handley Page Ltd.

In 1923, his doctoral thesis The Slotted Wing and its Importance for Aviation was accepted by Aachen Technical University. He then spent time as a designer at the Schneider aircraft works in Berlin before becoming chief designer at the Albatros aircraft works at Johannisthal in 1925, where he designed the Albatros L 72 and the twin-engined Albatros L 73 eight-passenger transport.

== Career ==
In 1926, Lachmann resigned from Albatros to join the Ishikawajima Aircraft Works in Tokyo as a technical adviser. He left Ishikawajima in 1929 to take a job with Handley Page in the United Kingdom as engineer in charge of slot development. In 1932, he was appointed chief designer, designing the H.P 54 Harrow and Hampden aircraft. In 1936, he was appointed to set up a special research department to work on a tailless aircraft design, the Handley Page H.P.75.

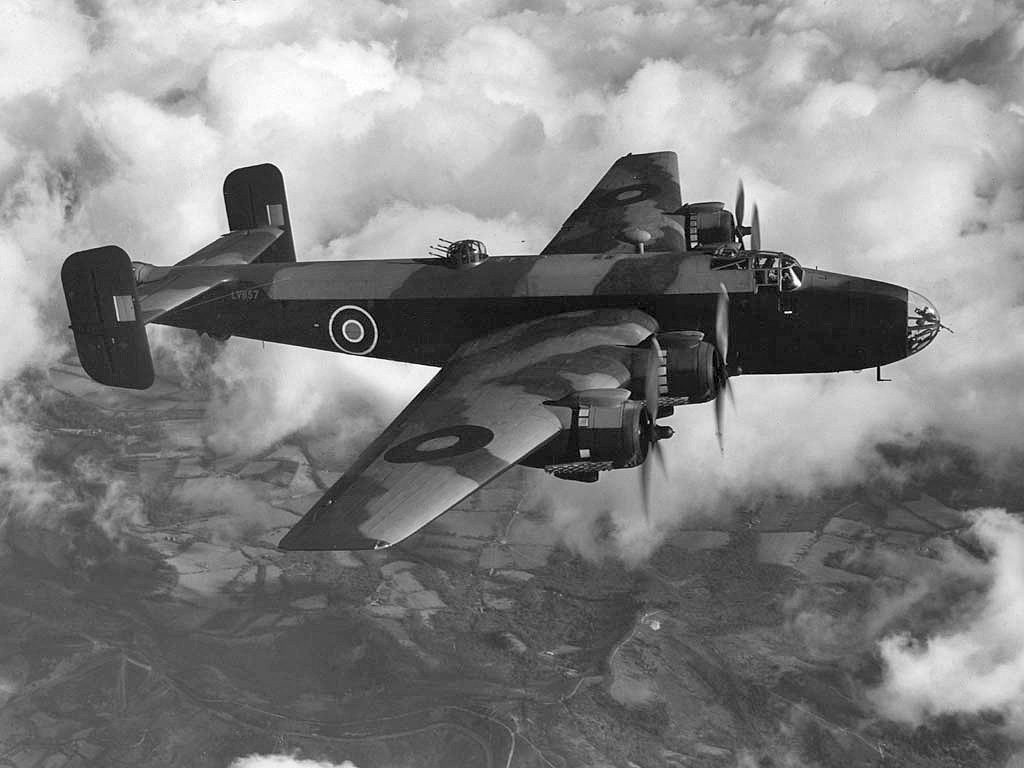
Handley Page Halifax; 6,178 Halifaxes were built

As the prospect of war loomed, Lachmann was put in charge of research & development for the Handley Page Halifax bomber.

Lachmann was regarded with suspicion by the British counter-intelligence service MI5 as a possible spy. Following the outbreak of World War II, he was interned as an enemy alien and was sent to Quebec City, Canada, on the SS Duchess of York, departing from Liverpool on June 20th 1940. However, British Security Service files mention that he was in an internment camp on the Isle of Man in 1942, followed by one established for the duration of the war at Lingfield Park Racecourse, in Surrey. After pressure from Handley-Page, the authorities permitted Lachmann to resume work for the company, although he remained detained at Lingfield.

In 1949, he became a British citizen. He wanted aircraft to have 'laminar flow control'. The new type of wing was tested on an Avro Lancaster at Cranfield in Bedfordshire.

He became research director at Handley-Page in 1953 and stayed with the company until he retired at the end of 1965. He died at Chorleywood, Hertfordshire in 1966, 5 months after he retired.

== Personal life ==
Lachmann married Evelyn Wyatt Gill in 1926 in Kobe in Japan; Evelyn (13 November 1897 - 27 February 1976) had been born in Kobe.

In the mid-1930s he lived in Mill Hill. In 1938 he lived at 'Dalla' on Canons Drive in Canons Park, Edgware. When he was arrested in January 1940, he lived in Edgware, with three children (two step-daughters).
