= Leading-edge slot =

Anti-stall control surface on aircraft

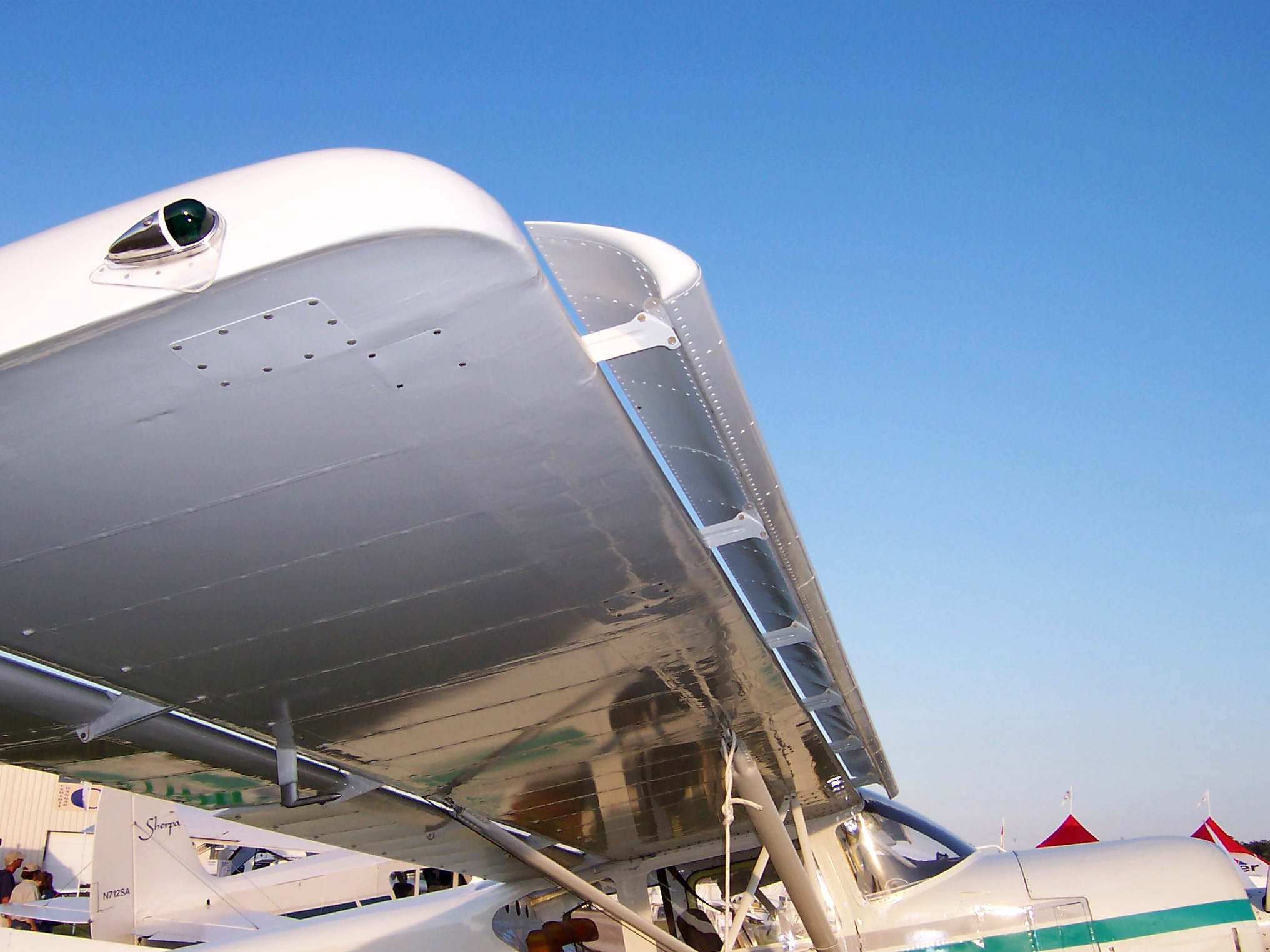
A leading-edge slot on a STOL aircraft

A leading-edge slot is a fixed aerodynamic feature of the wing of some aircraft to reduce the stall speed and promote good low-speed handling qualities. A leading-edge slot is a spanwise gap in each wing, allowing air to flow from below the wing to its upper surface. In this manner they allow flight at higher angles of attack and thus reduce the stall speed.

== Purpose and development ==
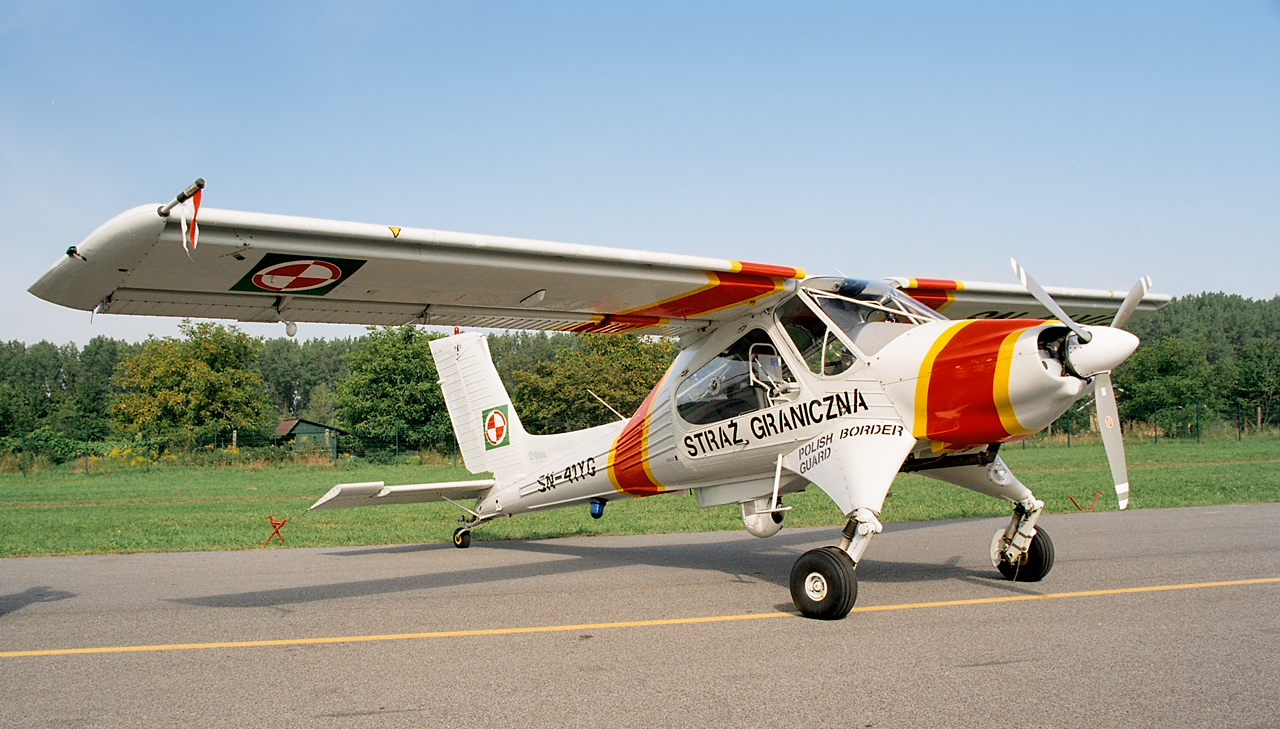
Full-span leading-edge slot in the wing of the PZL-104M Wilga 2000

At an angle of attack above about 15° many airfoils enter the stall. Modification of such an airfoil with a fixed leading-edge slot can increase the stalling angle to between 22° and 25°.

Slots were first developed by Handley Page in 1919 and the first aircraft to fly with them was the experimental H.P.17, a modified Airco DH.9A. Their invention is credited jointly to Sir Frederick Handley Page and Gustav Lachmann. The first aircraft fitted with controllable slots was the Handley Page H.P.20. Licensing the design became one of Handley Page's major sources of income in the 1920s.

Similar, but retractable, leading-edge devices are called slats. When the slat opens, it creates a slot between the slat and the remainder of the wing; retracted, the drag is reduced.

A fixed leading-edge slot can increase the maximum lift coefficient of an airfoil section by 40%. In conjunction with a slat, the increase in maximum lift coefficient can be 50% or even 60%.

Unlike trailing edge flaps, leading-edge slots do not increase the lift coefficient at zero angle of attack since they do not alter the camber.

== Operation ==
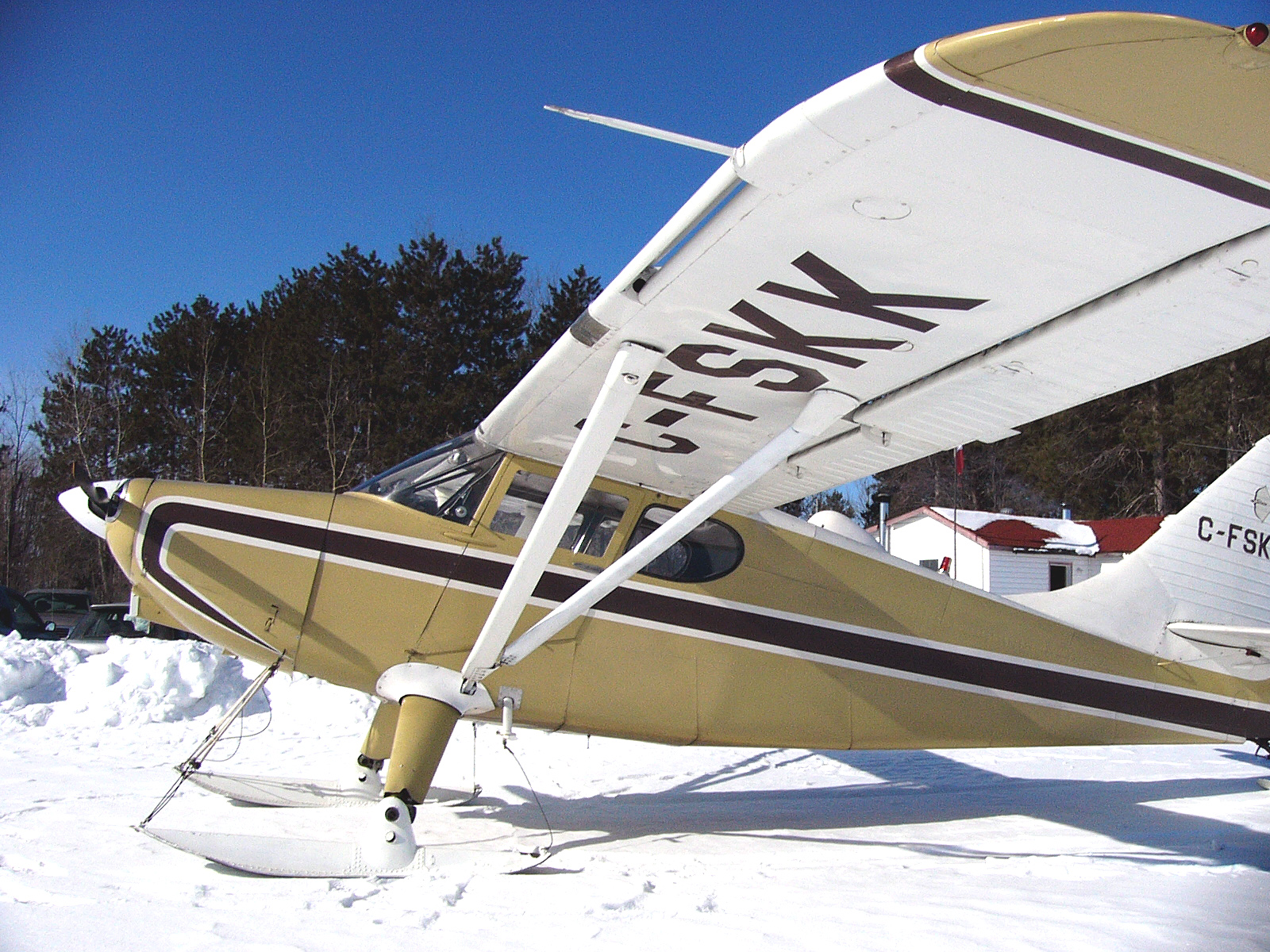
Partial-span leading-edge slot in the wing of a Stinson 108-3

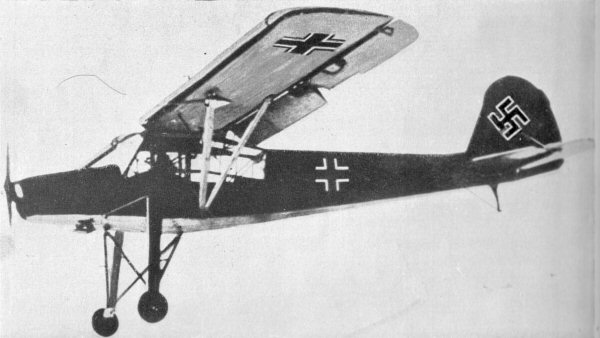
Fieseler Storch with full-span slots

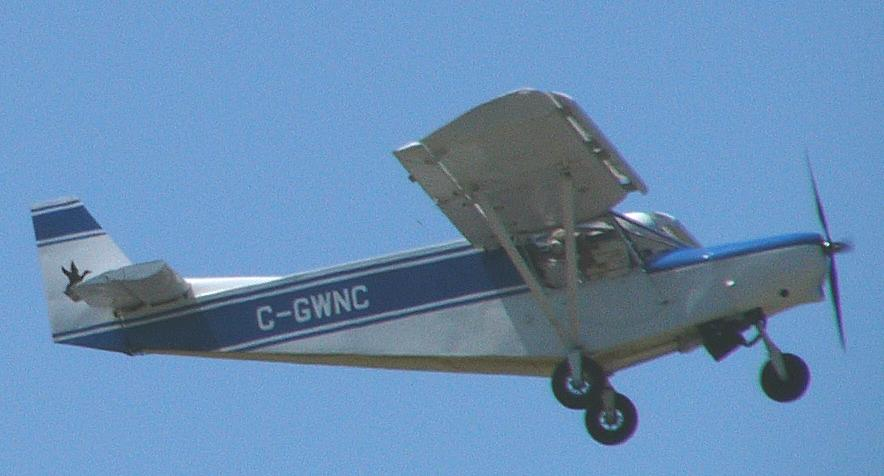
A Zenith STOL CH 701 showing its full-span slot.

A leading-edge slot is a fixed (non-closing) gap behind the wing's leading edge. Air from below the wing can accelerate through the slot towards the low pressure region above the wing, and exit from the slot moving parallel to the upper wing surface. This high-speed flow then mixes with the boundary layer attached to the upper surface and delays boundary layer separation from the upper surface.

Slots naturally exact a penalty on the aircraft in which they are used. This is because they contribute to drag compared to an unslotted wing. The extra drag at low speed is acceptable because of the beneficial reduction in stall speed and improvement in handling characteristics, but at higher speeds the extra drag contributed by slots is a significant disadvantage because it reduces cruising speed and increases fuel consumption per unit distance flown.

One way to reduce the cruise drag of slots is to make them able to be closed. This arrangement is known as leading-edge slats. Aerodynamically, slats work in the same way as fixed slots but slats can be retracted at higher speeds when they are not needed. Slats, in turn, are heavier and more complex than slots.

At low angles of attack the airflow through the slot is insignificant, although it contributes to drag. At progressively higher angles of attack, the flow of air through the slot becomes increasingly significant, accelerating from the higher pressure region below the wing to the lower pressure region on top of the wing. At high angles of attack the fastest airspeed relative to the airfoil is very close to the leading edge, on the upper surface. In this region of high local airspeed, skin friction (viscous force) is very high and the boundary layer arriving at the slot on the upper wing has lost much of its total pressure (or total mechanical energy) due to this friction. In contrast, the air passing through the slot has not experienced this high local airspeed or high skin friction, and its total pressure remains close to the free-stream value. The mixing of the upper surface boundary layer with air arriving through the slot re-energises the boundary layer which then remains attached to the upper surface of the wing to a higher angle of attack than if the slot were not there. The leading-edge slot was therefore one of the earliest forms of boundary layer control.

== Application of leading-edge slots ==
Leading-edge slots are generally of two types: those that are full-span and those that are partial-span.

Full-span slots are generally found on Short Take-off and Landing STOL aircraft like the Fieseler Storch, Dornier Do 27, PZL-104M Wilga 2000, and Zenair CH 701 STOL. Their primary purpose is to allow the aircraft to fly at a higher angle of attack before reaching the stalling angle.

In aircraft other than specialist STOL aircraft, full-span slots have serious drawbacks because, to take advantage of the high angle of attack at the stall, they usually necessitate long undercarriage legs that either cause high drag or are longer than can be accommodated easily inside the airframe.

Partial-span slots are usually found only on the outboard portion of the wing where they ensure airflow over that portion of the wing will remain unstalled at higher angles of attack than the inboard portions of the wing. This ensures the wing root stalls first and contributes to docile stall behaviour and maintaining aileron control throughout the stall. Using slots in this manner produces a similar result to employing washout on a wing, but through a different means. Examples of aircraft with partial-span, fixed slots are the Stinson 108, Bristol Beaufort, Lockheed Hudson, and Dornier Do 28D-2 Skyservant.

== See also ==
- Alula, a bird's biological equivalent to the leading-edge slot
- Leading-edge droop flap
- High-lift device
