= SABCA S.11 =

S.11
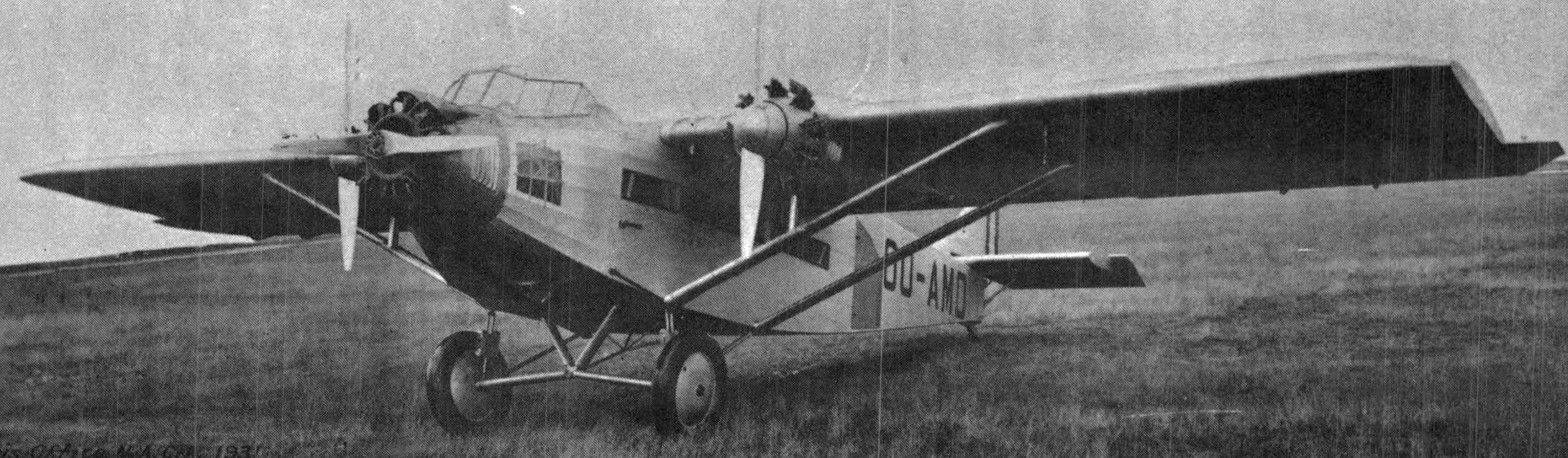

General information
- Type: Airliner
- National origin: Belgium
- Manufacturer: Sociétés Anonyme Belge de Constructions Aéronautiques
- Designer: Henri Jullien
- Number built: 1

History
- First flight: 12 August 1931

The SABCA S.11 or SABCA S.XI was a prototype Belgian airliner designed and produced by the Belgian aircraft manufacturer Sociétés Anonyme Belge de Constructions Aéronautiques (SABCA). It was a three-engined high-winged monoplane intended for service in the Belgian Congo, but only a single example was built.

The S.XI had a fuselage constructed of welded-steel tubing, covered by fabric. The crew of three (two pilots and a navigator) were accommodated in an enclosed cockpit ahead of the wing, while the aircraft's cabin had seats for up to 20 passengers. The wing structure comprised steel spars with duralumin ribs and covering, and was braced using steel struts. The aircraft's tail assembly was also composed of duralumin. It was powered by three Bristol Jupiter radial engines, rated at 420 horsepower (310 kW) each, with one mounted in the nose and the other two on the leading edge of the wing, each driving two-bladed propellers. The aircraft had a fixed conventional landing gear.

== Design and development ==
In 1926, the Belgian government issued a specification for an all-metal trimotor airliner to replace the wooden Handley Page W.8 biplanes used by Belgian airline SABENA in the Belgian Congo. To meet this requirement, the Belgian aircraft manufacturer Sociétés Anonyme Belge de Constructions Aéronautiques (SABCA) proposed a high-winged monoplane, the S.XI. It was designed by Henri Jullien, the company's chief engineer. At that time, the S.XI was the largest aircraft ever designed by the company; a key design influence was SABCA's recent acquisition of several patents from the Dutch aircraft manufacturer Fokker.

The S.XI was a high-wing semi-cantilever monoplane airliner that had a relatively large fuselage for the era. The framework of this fuselage comprised autogenously welded steel tubing that made use of construction techniques pioneered by Fokker. The upper edge of the fuselage directly attached to the wings. Each wing was supported via a pair of oblique struts, composed of steel tubing, that connected the central wing spars with the fittings of the landing gear struts. these struts were also faired with duralumin.

The wings were composed of a mixture of both sheet steel and light metals. In comparison to the aircraft's overall size, the wing had a relatively short span. The trailing edge of each wing was removable (attaching to the rear wing spar) and thus was independent of the principal structure of the wing. The planform of the wing was perfectly rectangular, with the exception of the balancing tips of the ailerons. Furthermore, it lacked any dihedral or sweepback while its thickness was uniform across the wing's entire length. The ailerons, which were relatively long and wide, were balanced by large surfaces towards their outer edges. The wing structure comprised a pair of spars made of high-resistance steel, connected by ribs and covered with plain sheet duralumin.

The fuselage had a rectangular cross-section and was covered with fabric. The cockpit, which was enclosed, was located immediately aft of the central engine and was separated from the passenger cabin by a partition with a door. Dual flight controls were typically fitted; the cockpit was also large enough to accommodate a navigator. The cabin could accommodate a maximum of twenty passengers in seats that were arranged into five rows of four, each with a central aisle. The cabin windows were fitted with sliding glass panes. Aft of the cabin was a single lavatory and a space intended for the stowage of baggage. As the chairs were removable, the cabin interior could be rearranged to suit the operator's preferences; one optional configuration included the fitting of up to six couches, which were intended for use on night flights.

The horizontal empennage consisted of a stabilizer (which could be adjusted mid-flight) and a two-part balanced elevator; it rested on the fuselage and was supported from underneath by a pair of struts. The vertical empennage comprised a triangular fin (adjustable during flight by the pilot) and a balanced rudder. Most elements, such as the spars, ribs and the entire covering of the tail, were composed of duralumin.

The S.XI was powered by a total of three SABCA Jupiter radial engines, each one capable of producing up to 420 hp; it was reportedly possible to install 500 hp engines if improved performance was desired. When equipped with Jupiter engines, the aircraft was expected be capable of attaining speeds as high as 230 kmph (143 mph) while the commercial cruising speed would have been around 210 kmph (130 mph) and used about 80 percent of its maximum power at low altitude. It was predicted that, when provided with engines capable of producing a combined 2000 hp, performance could be increased to a maximum speed of 260 kmph (161.6 mph) and a cruising speed of 220 kmph (137 mph). The S.XI had sufficient power to maintain level flight in the event of a single-engine failure. The central engine was mounted on a bearer (composed of steel tubing) within the nose of the fuselage while the side engines were mounted in the forward portion of two nacelles installed on both sides of the fuselage directly underneath the wing; these engines were cowled with sheet elektron.

The fuel tanks, which were composed of sheet elektron, had a sufficient capacity to permit commercial flights of up to 1,350 km (around 840 miles), albeit while carrying a reduced payload of 500 kg (1,100.3 lb.). While carrying a payload of 1,600 kg (3,527 lb.), the aircraft's endurance reduced to 500 km (310.7 miles) or less. The landing gear comprised a two-part steel axle that was hinged to the apex of an inverted pyramid underneath the centre of the fuselage. The wheels were fitted with Bendix-supplied brakes and were joined by two V-sections to fittings on the lower longerons of the fuselage while the front strut of each V-section was furnished with a shock absorber. The tail skid, which was also made of electron, was positioned just forward of the sternpost and carried a large shoe.

Although the prototype was originally expected to be completed sometime during 1928, it would not be ready until three years later. On 12 August 1931, the prototype performed its maiden flight in the hands of Charles Wouters, SABCA's chief pilot; it reportedly handled well during this flight. Flight testing revealed the need for some modifications; thus the prototype was fitted with a lengthened rear fuselage with a modified tail of similar design to that used by the SABCA S.12. The type was soon abandoned, with no production following.

== Specifications ==
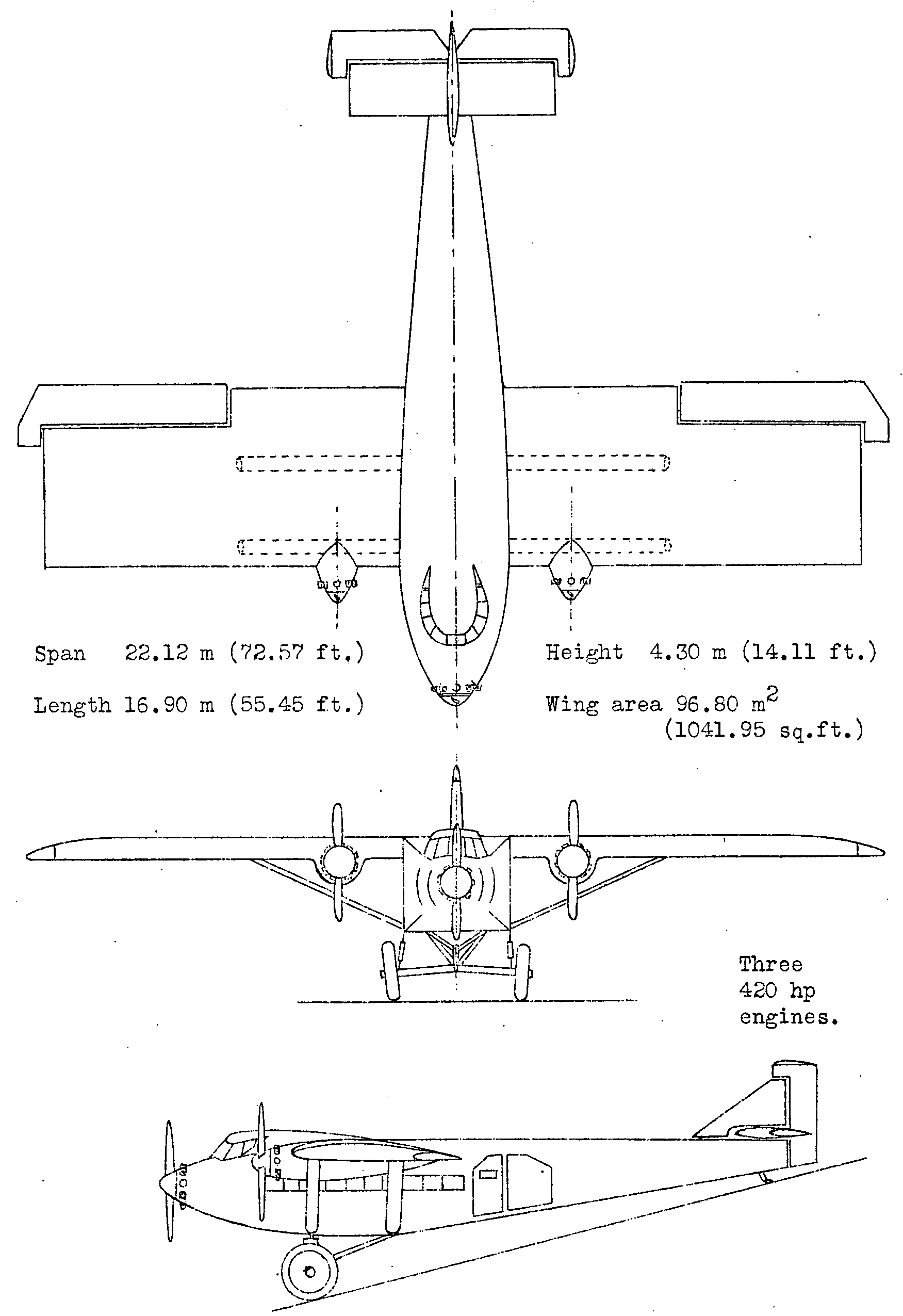
SABCA S.XI 3-view drawing from NACA-AC-160

Data from Flight 4 September 1931: S.A.B.C.A. S.XI., Jane's all the World's Aircraft 1931

General characteristics

- Crew: three (pilot, co-pilot and navigator)
- Capacity: 20 passengers
- Length: 16.9 m (55 ft 5 in)
- Wingspan: 22.12 m (72 ft 7 in)
- Height: 4.1 m (13 ft 5 in)
- Wing area: 96.8 m^{2} (1,042 sq ft)
- Empty weight: 4,127 kg (9,098 lb)
- Gross weight: 6,600 kg (14,551 lb)
- Fuel capacity: 2,880 litres (760 US gal; 630 imp gal)
- Powerplant: 3 × SABCA Jupiter nine-cylinder air-cooled radial piston engines, 310 kW (420 hp) each
- Propellers: 2-bladed fixed pitch metal propellers

Performance

- Maximum speed: 220 km/h (140 mph, 120 kn)
- Cruise speed: 200 km/h (120 mph, 110 kn)
- Range: 500 km (310 mi, 270 nmi)
- Service ceiling: 3,500 m (11,500 ft)
