= Farman MF.9 =

1910s French aircraft

MF.9
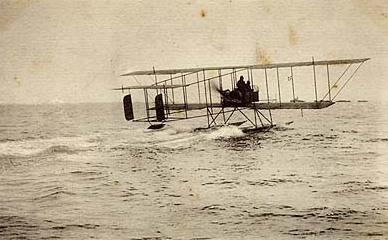

General information
- Type: Bomber biplane seaplane
- Manufacturer: Farman Aviation Works
- Designer: Maurice Farman

History
- First flight: 1913

The Maurice Farman MF.9 is a French bomber and reconnaissance biplane developed by Maurice Farman before World War I. Like the Maurice Farman MF.6, it used floats for take-off and landing on water.

== Specifications ==
Data from

General characteristics

- Crew: 2
- Length: 9.45 m (31 ft 0 in)
- Wingspan: 17.00 m (55 ft 9 in)
- Height: 3.90 m (12 ft 10 in)
- Empty weight: 755 kg (1,664 lb)
- Gross weight: 1,030 kg (2,271 lb)
- Powerplant: 1 × Renault 8B V-8 air-cooled piston engine, 52 kW (70 hp)

Performance

- Maximum speed: 90 km/h (56 mph, 49 kn)
