= No. 10 Squadron RAF =

Flying squadron of the Royal Air Force

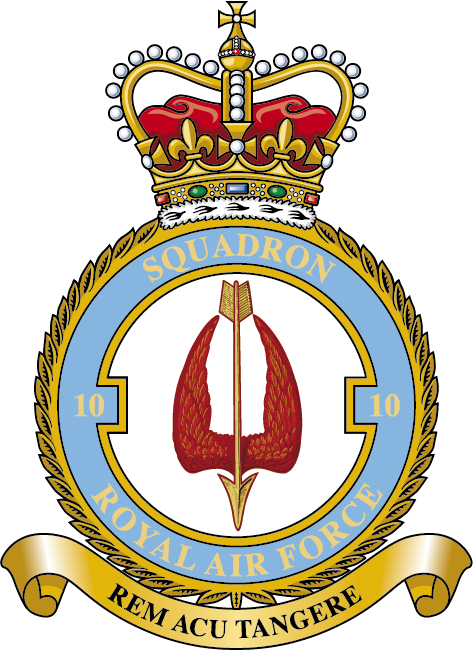
- Squadron badge
- Active: 1915–1918 (RFC); 1918–1919; 1928–1947; 1948–1950; 1953–1957; 1958–1964; 1966–2005; 2011–present
- Country: United Kingdom
- Branch: Royal Air Force
- Type: Flying squadron
- Role: Air transport and air-to-air refuelling
- Part of: Air Mobility Force
- Station: RAF Brize Norton
- Nickname: 'Shiny Ten'
- Mottos: Rem acu tangere (Latin for 'To hit the mark')
- Aircraft: Airbus Voyager KC2/KC3

Insignia
- Tail codes: PB (Nov 1938 – Sep 1939); ZA (Sep 1939 – Aug 1945; 1948–1950)

Number 10 Squadron is a Royal Air Force squadron. The squadron has served in a variety of roles since it was formed in 1915, including observation, bombing, transport and aerial refuelling. It currently flies the Airbus Voyager KC2/KC3 in the transport/tanker role from RAF Brize Norton, Oxfordshire.

== History ==
=== First World War ===
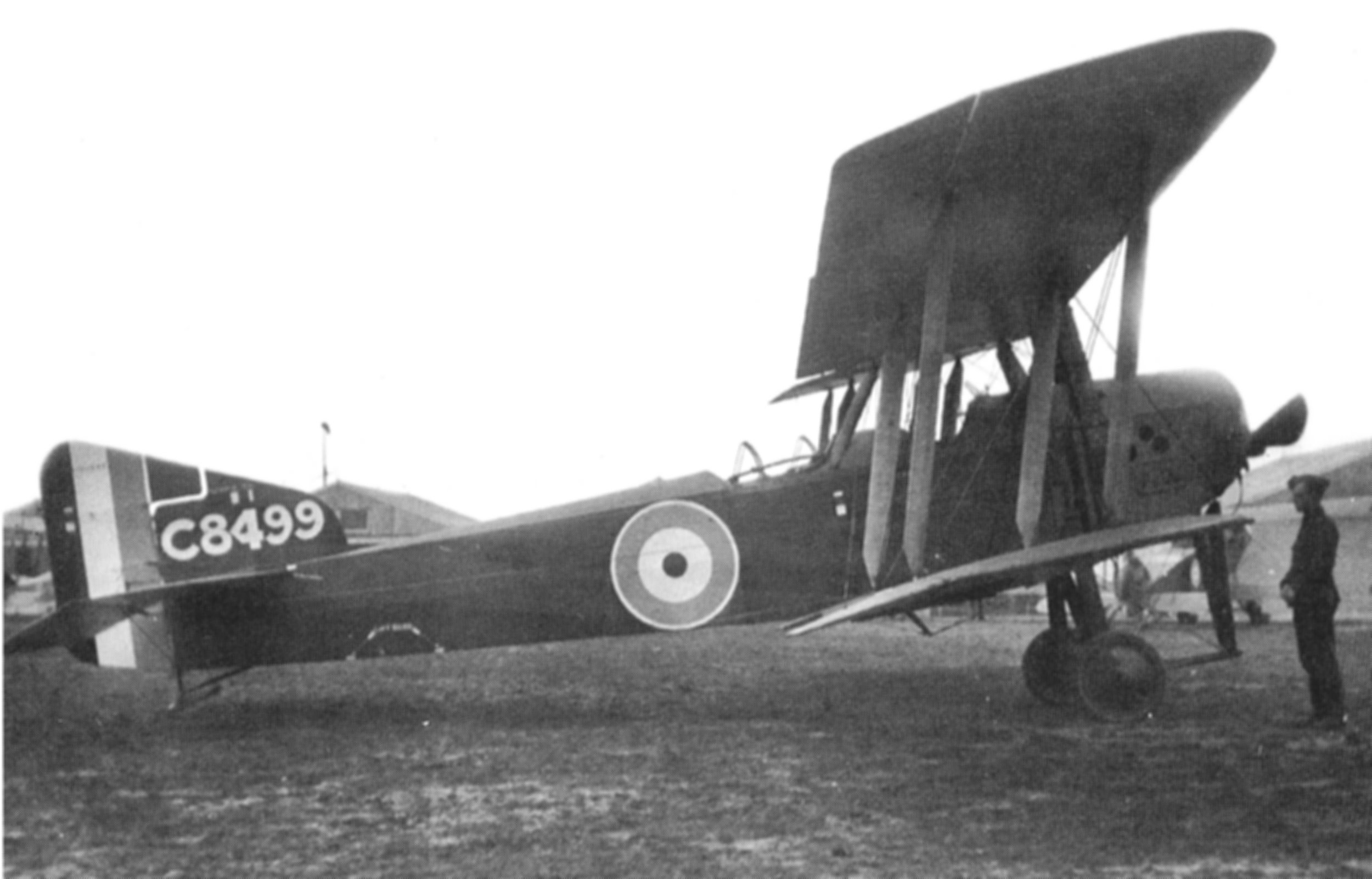
Armstrong Whitworth F.K.8, similar to what No. 10 Squadron operated between 1917 and 1918.

No. 10 Squadron of the Royal Flying Corps was formed from a nucleus provided by No. 1 Reserve Aircraft Squadron on 1 January 1915 at Farnborough Airfield, Hampshire. It initially acted as a training squadron until 27 July 1915 when it relocated to Saint-Omer on the Western Front in France. No. 10 Squadron's first major engagement was providing spotting for the Indian Corps during the Battle of Loos in September 1915 with the Royal Aircraft Factory B.E.2. The squadron also participated in the Battle of the Somme in 1916. In April 1917, No. 10 Squadron carried out spotting and bombing duties during the Second Battle of Arras. The squadron re-equipped with the Armstrong Whitworth F.K.8 in September 1917.

In June 1918, No. 10 Squadron began to receive the Bristol F.2b. The squadron participated in the Second Battle of the Somme between August and September 1918. The squadron briefly spent time in Germany as part of the army of occupation after the armistice. On 8 February 1919, the squadron was reduced to a cadre and returned to the UK. It was disbanded on 31 December 1919 following the end of the First World War, like many other squadrons.

=== Interwar ===
On 3 January 1928, No. 10 Squadron was reformed as a night bomber unit at RAF Upper Heyford with the Handley Page Hyderabad. The unit relocated to RAF Boscombe Down in April 1931 and re-equipped with the Handley Page Hinaidi. These soon gave way to the Vickers Virginia in September 1932 before being replaced by the Handley Page Heyford in 1934. On 16 September 1935, the unit helped provide the nucleus to form No. 97 Squadron and later helped form No. 78 Squadron on 1 November 1936. No. 10 Squadron moved to RAF Dishforth on 25 January 1937 to form part of the newly created No. 4 Group of RAF Bomber Command (which they would remain a part of throughout the Second World War), converting to the monoplane Armstrong Whitworth Whitley Mk.I.

=== Second World War ===
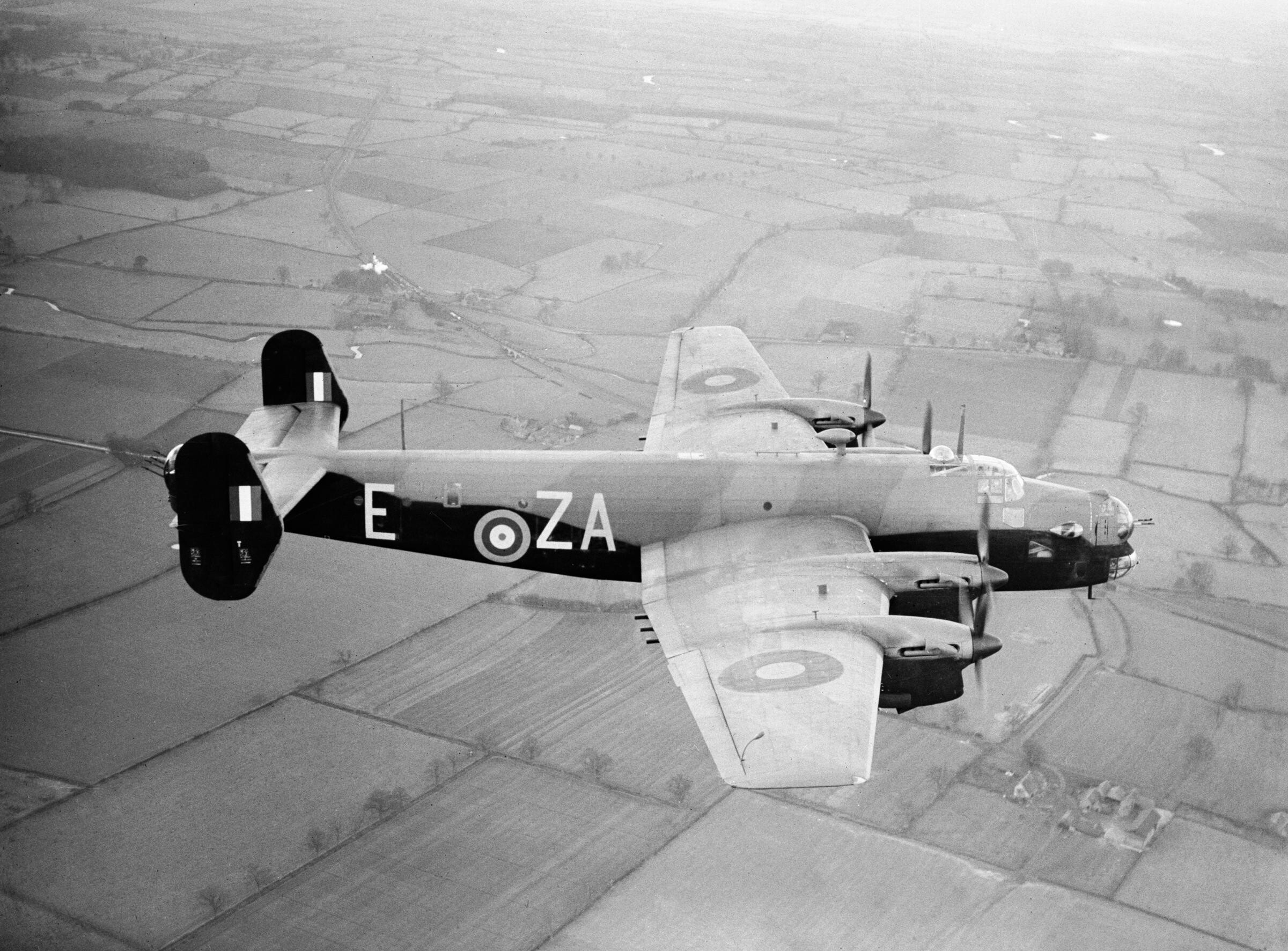
Handley Page Halifax Mk.II L9619 of No. 10 Squadron based at RAF Leeming, December 1941.

On 8 September 1939 the squadron began its first operation of the Second World War when it flew a leaflet dropping mission over Germany with the Whitley Mk.IV. On the night of 11th and 12th June 1940, Whitleys from No. 10 Squadron launched a raid on the Italian cities of Turin and Genoa. On 8 July 1940, the unit moved to RAF Leeming, Yorkshire. On 23 September 1940, the squadron launched a raid on the Boulogne docks in occupied-France.

In December 1941, No. 10 Squadron converted to the Handley Page Halifax Mk.I and Mk.II. In July 1942, the squadron was split in two when a detachment was sent to RAF Aqir, British Mandate, which went on to form No. 462 Squadron of the Royal Australian Air Force. On 19 August 1942, the squadron relocated to RAF Melbourne, Yorkshire, where it would remain until the end of the war in Europe.

On 7 May 1945, No. 10 Squadron was transferred to Transport Command and converted over to the Douglas Dakota. The squadron relocated to RAF Broadwell, Oxfordshire, on 6 August 1945.

=== Post-War ===
==== Transport Command (1945–1950) ====
Following the end of the war, No. 10 Squadron relocated to India in October 1945 where it carried out transport duties until it disbanded on 20 December 1947. The squadron was reformed once more on 4 October 1948 when No. 238 Squadron was renumbered to No. 10 Squadron at RAF Oakington, Cambridgeshire. Between 1948 and 1949, the squadron took part in the Berlin Airlift, operating from RAF Lübeck. No. 10 Squadron disbanded once more on 20 February 1950.

==== Bomber Command (1953–1964) ====
On 15 January 1953, No. 10 Squadron reverted to its original bomber role upon its reformation at RAF Scampton, Lincolnshire, with the English Electric Canberra B.2. In April 1955, the squadron moved to RAF Honington, Suffolk, while Scampton was closed for runway works. Between October and November 1956, the squadron deployed to RAF Nicosia, Cyprus, during the Suez Crisis. From RAF Nicosia, a Canberra B.2 of No. 10 Squadron dropped the first RAF bombs on Egypt during a raid on Almaza Air Base on 31 October 1956. The squadron disbanded on 15 January 1957.

No. 10 Squadron reformed at RAF Cottesmore on 15 April 1958 flying the Handley Page Victor B.1 until disbandment on 1 March 1964.

==== Vickers VC10 (1966–2005) ====
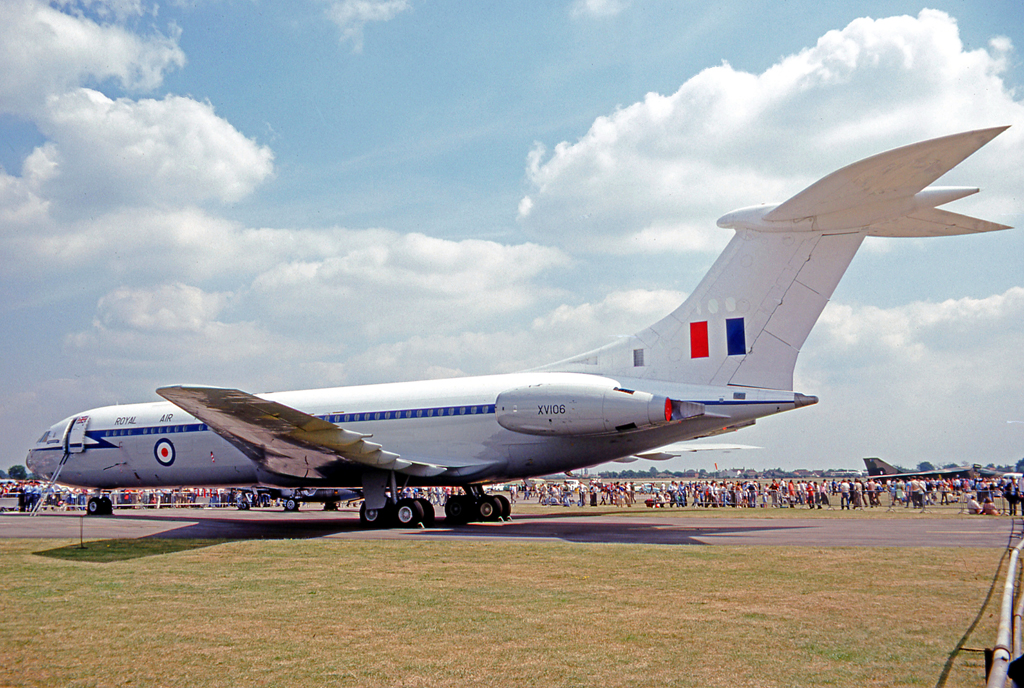
Vickers VC10 C.1 XV106 of No. 10 Squadron in 1977.

The squadron's numberplate was transferred back from Bomber Command to Transport Command in 1965, and on 1 July 1966 the squadron reformed at RAF Brize Norton as the first operators to receive the new Vickers VC10 C.1

Fourteen VC10 C.1 were delivered to the squadron between 1966 and 1967. The C.1 was a variant of the civil 'Standard VC10' fitted with the wing and more powerful engines of the 'Super VC10'. The C.1 could carry 139 passengers in rear-facing seats, eight standard pallets or up to 78 medical evacuation stretchers. These VC10s were named after airmen who had been awarded the Victoria Cross.

The most visible role No. 10 Squadron's VC10s played was that of VIP transport and aeromedical evacuations. In the VIP role, the C1 flew the British royal family, government ministers and Prime Ministers around the world. Later the VC10 VIP role was phased out, with VIP transport being carried out by the RAF's BAe 146 fleet and Boeing 767 airliners chartered from British Airways. However, former Prime Minister Tony Blair reverted to the VC10 for more sensitive flights, notably during his diplomatic trips to Pakistan and the Middle East after the 11 September 2001 attacks.

The rationalisation of the VC10 force led to No. 10 Squadron being disbanded on 14 October 2005, with their C.1(K) aircraft transferred to No. 101 Squadron.

=== Airbus Voyager (2011–present) ===
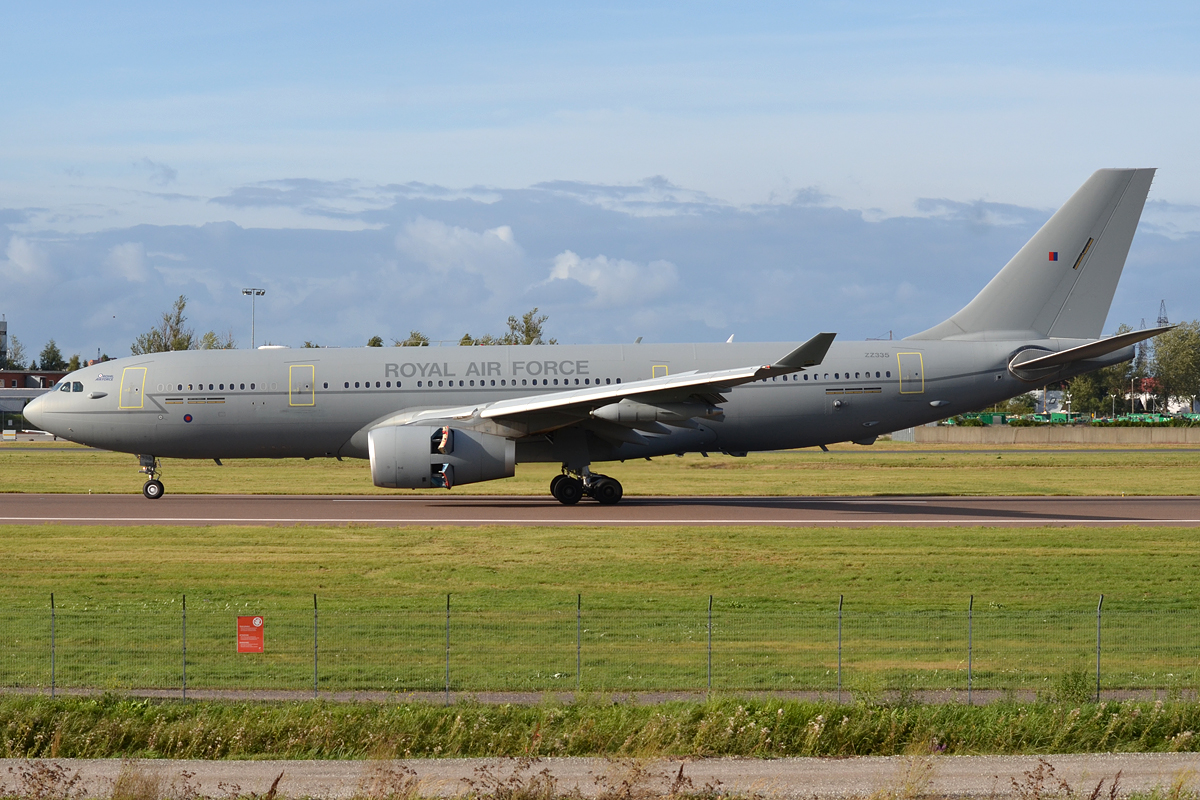
Airbus Voyager KC3 ZZ335 at Tallinn Airport, Estonia, August 2015.

In 2011, with the closure of RAF Lyneham and the transfer of the RAF's Lockheed C-130 Hercules force to RAF Brize Norton, it was announced that No. 10 Squadron would be reformed as the first operator of the new Airbus Voyager. The squadron was officially reformed on 1 July 2011. The first Voyager (ZZ330) was delivered to Brize Norton on 5 April 2012. Operations began with the Voyager on 12 May 2012, with a sortie flown from Brize Norton to RAF Akrotiri, Cyprus. The first air-to-air refuelling flight with the Voyager took place on 20 May 2013, when No. 10 Squadron refuelled several Panavia Tornado GR4.

No. 10 Squadron has helped support Operation Shader since September 2014.

On 10 May 2026, a Voyager refuelled an Airbus A400M Atlas over the South Atlantic on a mission to dispatch six paratroopers and two military clinicians from 16 Air Assault Brigade, along with palletized medical supplies, to the remote island colony of Tristan da Cunha where a British subject had fallen ill. The A400M flew 6,788 km from RAF Brize Norton to Ascension Island, then with a Voyager in support, flew another 3,000 km to make its drop. Tristan da Cunha does not have an airfield, and is normally only accessible by boat.

== Aircraft operated ==
Aircraft operated include:

- Farman MF.7 (January 1915 – April 1915)
- Farman MF.6 (January 1915 – April 1915)
- Blériot XI (January 1915 – April 1915)
- Martinsyde S.1 (January 1915 – April 1915)
- Royal Aircraft Factory B.E.2c (January 1915 – April 1917)
- Royal Aircraft Factory B.E.12 (June 1916 – July 1916)
- Royal Aircraft Factory B.E.2d (July 1916 – February 1917)
- Royal Aircraft Factory B.E.2e (December 1916 – July 1917)
- Royal Aircraft Factory B.E.2f (January 1917 – July 1917)
- Royal Aircraft Factory B.E.2g (January 1917 – July 1917)
- Armstrong Whitworth F.K.8 (July 1917 – February 1919)
- Bristol F.2b (June 1918 – October 1918)
- Handley Page Hyderabad (January 1928 – November 1931)
- Handley Page Hinaidi (December 1930 – September 1932)
- Vickers Virginia Mk.X (September 1932 – January 1935)
- Handley Page Heyford Mk.Ia (August 1934 – January 1936)
- Handley Page Heyford Mk.III (November 1935 – June 1937)
- Armstrong Whitworth Whitley Mk.I (March 1937 – June 1939)
- Armstrong Whitworth Whitley Mk.IV (May 1939 – May 1940)
- Armstrong Whitworth Whitley Mk.V (May 1940 – December 1941)
- Handley Page Halifax Mk.I (December 1941 – August 1942)
- Handley Page Halifax Mk.II (December 1941 – March 1944)
- Handley Page Halifax Mk.III (March 1944 – May 1945)
- Douglas Dakota Mk.III (May 1945 – December 1947)
- Douglas Dakota Mk.IV/C.4 (May 1945 – December 1947; October 1948 – February 1950)
- English Electric Canberra B.2 (January 1953 – December 1956)
- Handley Page Victor B.1 (April 1958 – March 1964)
- Vickers VC10 C.1 (July 1966 – November 1995)
- Vickers VC10 C.1K (December 1992 – October 2005)
- Airbus Voyager KC.2 (April 2012 – present)
- Airbus Voyager KC.3 (September 2013 – present)

== Heritage ==
=== Badge and motto ===
The squadron's badge features a winged arrow with wings. It was designed by Wing Commander Arthur T. Whitelock who was inspired by watching archery practice in Oxford. He thought the bomb was the modern equivalent of the medieval arrow, and the wings were added to represent speed. the badge was approved by King George VI in September 1937.

The squadrons motto is Rem acu tangere (Latin for 'To hit the mark').

== Battle honours ==
No. 10 Squadron has received the following battle honours.

- Western Front (1915–1918)
- Loos (1915)
- Somme (1916)
- Arras (1917)
- Somme (1918)
- Channel & North Sea (1940–1945)
- Norway (1940)
- Ruhr (1940–1945)
- Fortress Europe (1940–1944)
- German Ports (1942–1945)
- Biscay Ports (1940–1944)
- Berlin (1940–1945)
- Invasion Ports (1940)
- France and Germany (1944–1945)
- Norway (1944)
- Rhine (1944–1945)
- Gulf (1991)
- Afghanistan (2001–2014)
- Iraq (2003–2011)

== See also ==
- List of Royal Air Force aircraft squadrons
