= Handley Page Hyderabad =

1923 bomber aircraft by Handley Page

Handley Page H.P.24 Hyderabad
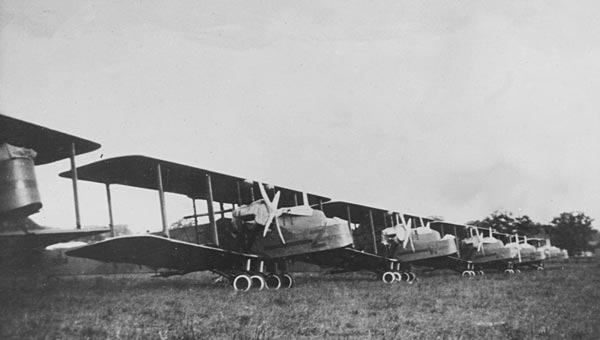

General information
- Type: Heavy bomber
- Manufacturer: Handley Page
- Primary user: Royal Air Force
- Number built: 39 (Note: Original order was 44 plus prototype but a number of Hyderabads were completed as Hinaidis and others converted)

History
- Introduction date: 1925
- First flight: 23 October 1923
- Retired: 1933
- Developed from: Handley Page W.8
- Variant: Handley Page Hinaidi

The Handley Page H.P.24 Hyderabad was a twin-engine biplane heavy bomber designed and produced by the British aircraft manufacturer Handley Page. It holds the distinction of being the last wooden heavy bomber to be operated by the Royal Air Force (RAF). The De Havilland Mosquito also wooden carried twice the bomb load.

The Hyderabad was produced as a replacement night bomber for the RAF's Vickers Vimy and Airco DH.10 Amiens bombers. It was a derivative of the Handley Page W.8 airliner, having been originally envisioned to perform additional roles such as transporting troops and coastal patrol duties. It was one of the first large aircraft to be furnished with Handley Page leading edge slats. An order for a single prototype was received by the company on 13 January 1923, which performed its maiden flight during October of that same year. Proving itself superior to the rival Vickers Virginia, an initial order for 15 Hyderabad bombers was issued to Handley Page.

It was introduced to service in 1925 as a front line bomber. A total of four squadrons, half being regular squadrons and the other special reserve units, were equipped with the type. It continued to serve in its capacity as a bomber with the RAF up to 1933, by which point the Hyderabad had been eclipsed by more capable aircraft. In addition to its use in Britain, an export arrangement was sought by the Belgian aircraft company SABCA, but this was rejected to the supposed involvement of the Soviet Union. Potential overseas sales were complicated due to the Hyderabad being placed on the Secret List, making it difficult to share any information on the aircraft.

== Development ==
=== Background ===
The origins of the Hyderabad was initiated in response to the Air Ministry issuing multiple Specifications during October 1920, including D/R4, D/R9, and D/R12, which sought a long-range bomber, coastal defense torpedo bomber, and troop-transport respectively. Amongst the various proposals received was a submission by Handley Page for a single aircraft to fulfil the requirements of all three specifications. The envisioned aircraft was actually a derivative of an airliner, the Handley Page W.8, that was already in production by the company. While this proposal was not acted upon at this time, two years later, tenders were sought for Specification 31/22, a replacement night bomber for the Airco DH.10 Amiens and the Vickers Vimy. Handley Page's submission, initially referred to as W.8D, shared many of its features, such as the wings, tail, and undercarriage with the W.8B.

Having been sufficiently impressed by the proposal, the company was awarded contract No. 369332/22 to produce a single prototype W.8D on 13 January 1923. This aircraft performed its maiden flight during October 1923, piloted by Arthur Wilcockson. During service trials of the prototype undertaken by the Aeroplane and Armament Experimental Establishment (A & AEE) at Martlesham Heath, it was evaluated against the rival Vickers Virginia. While bearing equal payloads, the W.8D proved to possess superior performance, as well as being a lighter aircraft overall. Consequently, Handley Page was issued with a production contract to produce an initial batch of 15 aircraft, which was officially designated Hyderabad.

=== Into production ===
Aviation author C. H. Barnes claims that financial difficulties on the part of Handley Page were responsible for the Hyderabad's relatively slow rate of production, which was such that the Air Ministry intervened in the matter and reapportioned contractual responsibility to the company. These production difficulties did not deter international interest in the bomber; the Belgian aircraft company SABCA requested a license to locally manufacture its own Hyderabads; however, the Air Ministry formally refused to authorise any such deal allegedly due to suspicions that the Soviet Union might have been seeking to procure the aircraft for its own military purposes. Handley Page also received an official reprimand for sharing detailed drawings of the Hyderabad with the Italian press, as the aircraft had been placed on the Secret List.

During June 1927, a second batch of eight Hyderabads was ordered, followed shortly thereafter by a third order for eleven aircraft to equip a second RAF squadron. During 1928, a final batch of eleven Hyderabads, however some of these were equipped with Bristol Jupiter VIII radial engines and separately designated as the Handley Page Hinaidi instead. This aircraft was a derivative of, and effectively a successor to, the Hinaidi, incorporating multiple advances and being capable of superior performance. During the operating lives of these aircraft, several were reengined with Lion engines due to a shortage of Jupiters, leading to them being designated once again as Hyderabads.

== Design ==
The Handley Page Hyderabad was a twin-engine biplane heavy bomber featuring all-wooden construction. From a structural perspective, it shared a high degree of similarity with the preceding W.8 airliner. Propulsion consisted of a pair of Napier Lion engines, which were installed upon the aircraft without the use of fairings. Fuel was located in tanks slung underneath the upper wing, relying upon gravity to feed the engines. The Hyderabad was furnished with a single fin and rudder, and was one of the first large aircraft to be fitted with Handley Page leading edge slats, which gave the aircraft a high degree of lateral stability.

The Hydrderabad was typically operated by a crew of four, comprising two pilots and two gunners. The pilots, which were seated in a tandem arrangement in separate cockpits, both being forward of the wing and provided with a favourable all-round external view. The forward gunner also doubled as the bomb-aimer. In terms of its armaments, it could carry a pair of 550 lb bombs, or a larger number of smaller munitions; a self-defense capability in the form of three Lewis guns mounted on Scarff rings positioned at the nose, mid-upper fuselage, and a rear-firing ventral location.

== Operational history ==
During December 1925, the Hyderabad entered service with No. 99 (Bomber) Squadron at RAF Bircham Newton, where it replaced the single-engined Avro Aldershot bomber. Barnes observed that the squadron's personnel generally had high opinions of the aircraft, especially after the redesigned rudder had been standardised. Deliveries of the type were slow, while attrition losses through multiple accidents were relatively high, a combination of factors which delayed the formation of the second squadron, No. 10 Squadron at RAF Upper Heyford until 1928. Despite several accidents occurring, there were no fatalities; Barnes speculates that this was a unique feat amongst RAF aircraft of the era.

During 1928 and 1929, two Special Reserve squadrons were also formed, receiving the Hyderabad as equipment. On 12 October 1928, a Hyderabad of No.99 Squadron undertook a particularly noteworthy flight for the time, performing a non-stop flight between Upper Heyford and Turnhouse. During 1931, both of the regular squadrons flying the Hyderabad were re-equipped with the Handley Page Hinaidi, an all-metal development of the Hyderabad. The final reserve Squadron, No. 503, continued to operate their Hyderabad inventory until 1933.

== Operators ==
United Kingdom

- Royal Air Force
  - No. 10 Squadron
  - No. 99 Squadron
  - No. 502 (Ulster) Squadron RAF Special Reserve
  - No. 503 (County of Lincoln) Squadron RAF Special Reserve

== Specifications (Hyderabad) ==
Data from The British Bomber since 1914

General characteristics

- Crew: 4
- Length: 59 ft 2 in (18.03 m)
- Wingspan: 75 ft 0 in (22.86 m)
- Height: 16 ft 9 in (5.11 m)
- Wing area: 1,471 sq ft (136.7 m^{2})
- Empty weight: 8,910 lb (4,042 kg)
- Gross weight: 13,590 lb (6,164 kg)
- Powerplant: 2 × Napier Lion V or VA W-12 water-cooled piston engine, 500 hp (370 kW) each at 2,250 rpm
- Propellers: 4-bladed fixed-pitch propellers

Performance

- Maximum speed: 109 mph (175 km/h, 95 kn)
- Range: 500 mi (800 km, 430 nmi)
- Service ceiling: 14,000 ft (4,300 m)
- Rate of climb: 800 ft/min (4.1 m/s)
- Wing loading: 9.24 lb/sq ft (45.1 kg/m^{2})
- Power/mass: 0.074 hp/lb (0.122 kW/kg)

Armament

- Guns: 3 × .303 in (7.7 mm) Lewis Guns in nose, dorsal and ventral positions
- Bombs: 1,100 lb (499 kg) bombs carried externally

== See also ==
Related development

- Handley Page W.8
- Handley Page Hinaidi
- Handley Page Clive

Aircraft of comparable role, configuration, and era

- Vickers Vimy
- Vickers Virginia

Related lists

- List of aircraft of the RAF
