= Handley Page Hinaidi =

1927 bomber aircraft family by Handley Page

Hinaidi
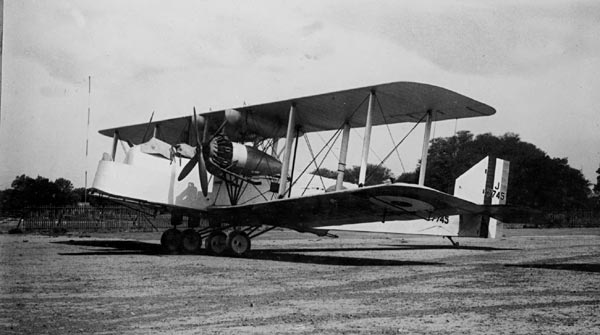

General information
- Type: Heavy night bomber
- Manufacturer: Handley Page
- Primary user: Royal Air Force
- Number built: 36

History
- Introduction date: 1929
- First flight: 26 March 1927
- Retired: 1935
- Developed from: Handley Page Hyderabad

The Handley Page Hinaidi was one of two twin-engine bombers built by Handley Page that served with the Royal Air Force between 1925 and 1935. The aircraft was developed from the Handley Page Hyderabad and named after Hinaidi, an RAF station in Iraq.

== Design and development ==
In 1923, Handley Page designed and built a new heavy bomber based on its W.8 airliner, the Hyderabad. The Hyderabad was an all-wooden biplane powered by two Napier Lion engines. Forty-five were built, entering service from 1925.

The Hinaidi was an improved version of the Hyderabad built to meet Air Ministry Specification 13/29. The first machine, the HP33 Hinaidi I -in fact an early production Hyderabad, J7745, with another engine and a change of fin and rudder- first flew on 26 March 1927. At least four Hyderabads were converted to Hinaidi Is, while six late-production Hyderabads were completed as Hinaidi Is, retaining the wooden airframe of the Hyderabads. The first true Hinaidi, the HP36 Hinaidi II, went into production after major structural modifications were implemented, the structure being changed from wooden to metal.

A re-engined version with two 480 hp Siddeley Jaguars was proposed, the HP44 Hinaidi III, but not built.

== Operational history ==
The prototype Hinaidi was transferred to India in 1928, and between December 1928 and February 1929, took part in the Kabul airlift, carrying out eight evacuation flights and carrying 38 evacuees. It later joined the Heavy Transport Flight at Lahore where it served until scrapped in 1933. The first 33 aircraft came into service in 1929, and were issued to No. 99, No. 10 and No. 503 squadrons. Total production ended with 36 aircraft, with some being converted to transport aircraft on the North-West Frontier in India. The Clive II transport version operated out of Lahore.

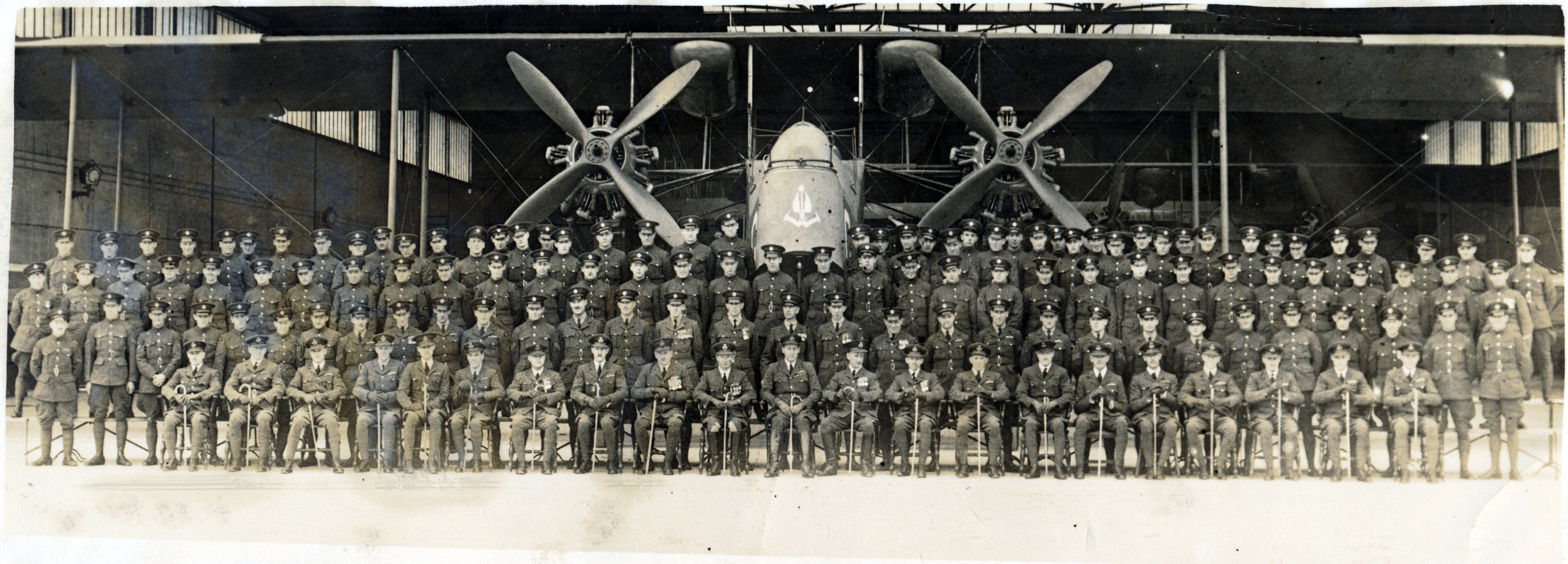
Photo taken c.1930 RAF Upper Heyford (No. 10 Bombing Squadron)

== Variants ==
- HP.33 Hinaidi I

Wooden airframe. Three built, one prototype, J7745, as a conversion of a Hyderabad, two from new, with seven Hyderabads converted.

- HP.33 Clive I

One of the Hinaidi I prototypes, J9126, built using a W.10 fuselage as a transport design later converted to become Clive III though not entering service as such. Later as G-ABYX sold to Sir Alan Cobham with his air circus and named "Youth of Australia" and later renamed "Astra".

- HP.35 Clive II

Two transport aircraft built, all-metal structure, J9948 and J9949.

- HP.36 Hinaidi II

All-metal airframe. 34 built, prototype J9478 and production K1063-K1078 and K1909-K1925. Approximately 20+ aircraft were converted into Clive II transport aircraft configuration in the early 1930s.

== Operators ==
United Kingdom

- Royal Air Force
  - No. 10 Squadron RAF
  - No. 99 Squadron RAF
  - No. 503 Squadron RAF
  - Heavy Transport Flight RAF – Handley Page Clive

== Specifications (Hinaidi Mk II) ==
Data from Aircraft of the Royal Air Force.

General characteristics

- Crew: 4
- Capacity: 4,000 lb (1,814 kg) cargo in transport version (Clive)
- Length: 59 ft 2 in (18.03 m)
- Wingspan: 75 ft (23 m)
- Height: 17 ft (5.2 m)
- Wing area: 1,471 sq ft (136.7 m^{2})
- Empty weight: 8,040 lb (3,647 kg)
- Gross weight: 14,400 lb (6,532 kg)
- Powerplant: 2 × Bristol Jupiter VIII 9-cylinder air-cooled radial piston engines, 440 hp (330 kW) each
- Propellers: 4-bladed fixed-pitch wooden propellers

Performance

- Maximum speed: 123 mph (198 km/h, 107 kn)
- Cruise speed: 75 mph (121 km/h, 65 kn)
- Range: 850 mi (1,370 km, 740 nmi)
- Service ceiling: 14,900 ft (4,500 m)
- Rate of climb: 380 ft/min (1.9 m/s)
- Wing loading: 9.79 lb/sq ft (47.8 kg/m^{2})
- Power/mass: 0.061 hp/lb (0.100 kW/kg)

Armament

- Guns: 3 × 0.303 in (7.7 mm) Lewis Guns in nose, dorsal and ventral positions
- Bombs: 1,450 lb (657 kg) bomb load

== See also ==
Aircraft of comparable role, configuration, and era

- Vickers Virginia

Related lists

- List of aircraft of the Royal Air Force
- List of bomber aircraft
