= No. 99 Squadron RAF =

Flying squadron of the Royal Air Force

- Squadron badge
- Active: 15 Aug 1917 – 1 April 1918 (RFC); 1 April 1918 – 1 April 1920 (RAF); 1 April 1924 – 15 November 1945; 17 Nov 1945 – 6 January 1976; November 2000 – present
- Country: United Kingdom
- Branch: Royal Air Force
- Type: Flying squadron
- Role: Strategic and tactical air transport, aeromedical evacuation
- Part of: No. 2 Group
- Home station: RAF Brize Norton
- Nickname: 'Madras Presidency'
- Mottos: Quisque tenax (Latin for 'Each tenacious')
- Aircraft: Boeing C-17 Globemaster III
- Battle honours: Western Front (1918)*; Independent Force and Germany (1918); Mahsud (1919-1920); Waziristan (1919-1920); German Ports (1940-1941); Baltic (1940-1941); France and Low Countries (1940); Fortress Europe (1940-1942)*; Ruhr 1940-1942*; Berlin (1940-42)*; Biscay Ports (1940); Arakan (1942-44); Burma (1944-45); Manipur (1944); Eastern Waters (1945); Afghanistan (2001–2014); Iraq (2003-2011); Libya (2011); * Honours marked with an asterisk may be emblazoned on the Squadron Standard

Insignia
- Squadron badge heraldry: A puma salient. Selected because the squadrons first aircraft had Puma engines, the cat chosen for independence and tenacity while the black colour signifies the night-bombing role.
- Squadron codes: VF (Apr 1939 – Sep 1939); LN (Sep 1939 – Feb 1942)

No. 99 Squadron is a squadron of the Royal Air Force which operates the Boeing C-17 Globemaster III strategic/tactical transport aircraft from RAF Brize Norton.

The squadron conducts global deployments on behalf of the British Armed Forces and the UK Government, notably delivering emergency aid during natural disasters and supporting military operations overseas.

No. 99 was a bomber squadron in both World War I and World War II. The squadron was the first RAF unit to receive the Avro Aldershot, Handley Page Hyderabad, Handley Page Hinaidi, Vickers Wellington, Bristol Britannia and Boeing Globemaster III. In the case of the Avro Aldershot, the squadron was its only operator, as it is now for the Globemaster III.

== History ==
=== World War I ===
What would later become No. 99 (Madras Presidency) Squadron was originally formed at Yatesbury, Wiltshire, England on 15 August 1917 from elements supplied by No. 13 Training Squadron, RFC. It was equipped with de Havilland DH.9 bombers in 1918, deploying to France to form part of the Independent Air Force, the RAF's strategic bombing force. It flew its first mission on 21 May and continued to take part in large scale daylight raids against targets in Germany, sustaining heavy losses due both to the unreliable nature of the DH.9 and heavy German opposition. As an example, during one raid against railway targets in Saarbrücken on 31 July 1918, seven out of nine aircraft from 99 Squadron were shot down, with a further three DH.9s turning back with engine trouble before the formation crossed the enemy lines 99 Squadron was withdrawn from the front line on 25 September to be re-equipped with de Havilland DH.9A bombers, and it was still in the process of converting when the war ended. During the war it had taken part in 76 bombing raids, dropping 61 tons of bombs and claiming 12 German aircraft, of which eight were during the raid of 31 July.

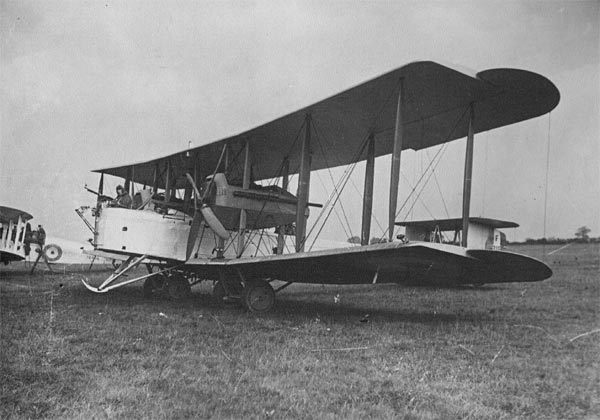
A Vickers Vimy bomber

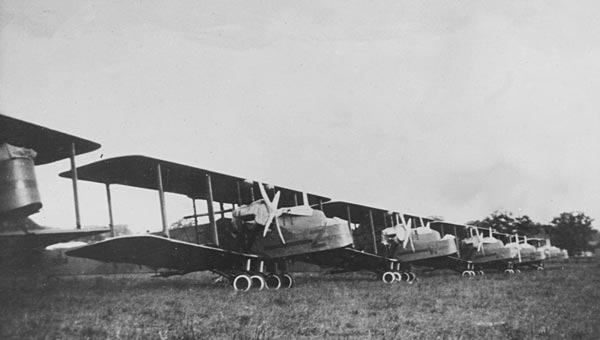
Handley Page H.P.24 Hyderabads

In 1919 the squadron was sent to India, flying patrols over the North-West Frontier from Mianwali and Kohat during the Mahsud and Waziristan campaigns. It was disbanded by being renumbered to No. 27 Squadron on 1 April 1920.

=== Inter-war period ===
No. 99 Squadron reformed on 1 April 1924 at Netheravon, Wiltshire, flying Vickers Vimys. In May 1924, it moved to RAF Bircham Newton in Norfolk, uniquely receiving the Avro Aldershot single-engined heavy bomber. These were replaced at the end of 1925 by twin-engined Handley Page Hyderabads, the squadron moving to RAF Upper Heyford in December 1927. In 1929, it again switched to new aircraft when it began receiving Handley Page Hinaidis, a radial engined derivative of the Hyderabad. By 1933, the Hinaidi, which was little improvement over bombers in use during the First World War, was recognised as obsolete, and in November the unit received the first production Handley Page Heyford heavy bombers. While these carried twice the bombload of the earlier aircraft, and had significantly better performance, they soon became outclassed. However, No. 99 Squadron, which had moved to RAF Mildenhall in November 1934, was obliged to retain the Heyford until October 1938, when it converted to Vickers Wellington monoplanes. In September 1935, "B" flight of No. 99 Squadron was split off to form 38 Squadron, while on 12 April 1937 the squadron again detached "B" flight, this time to form 149 Squadron.

=== World War II ===
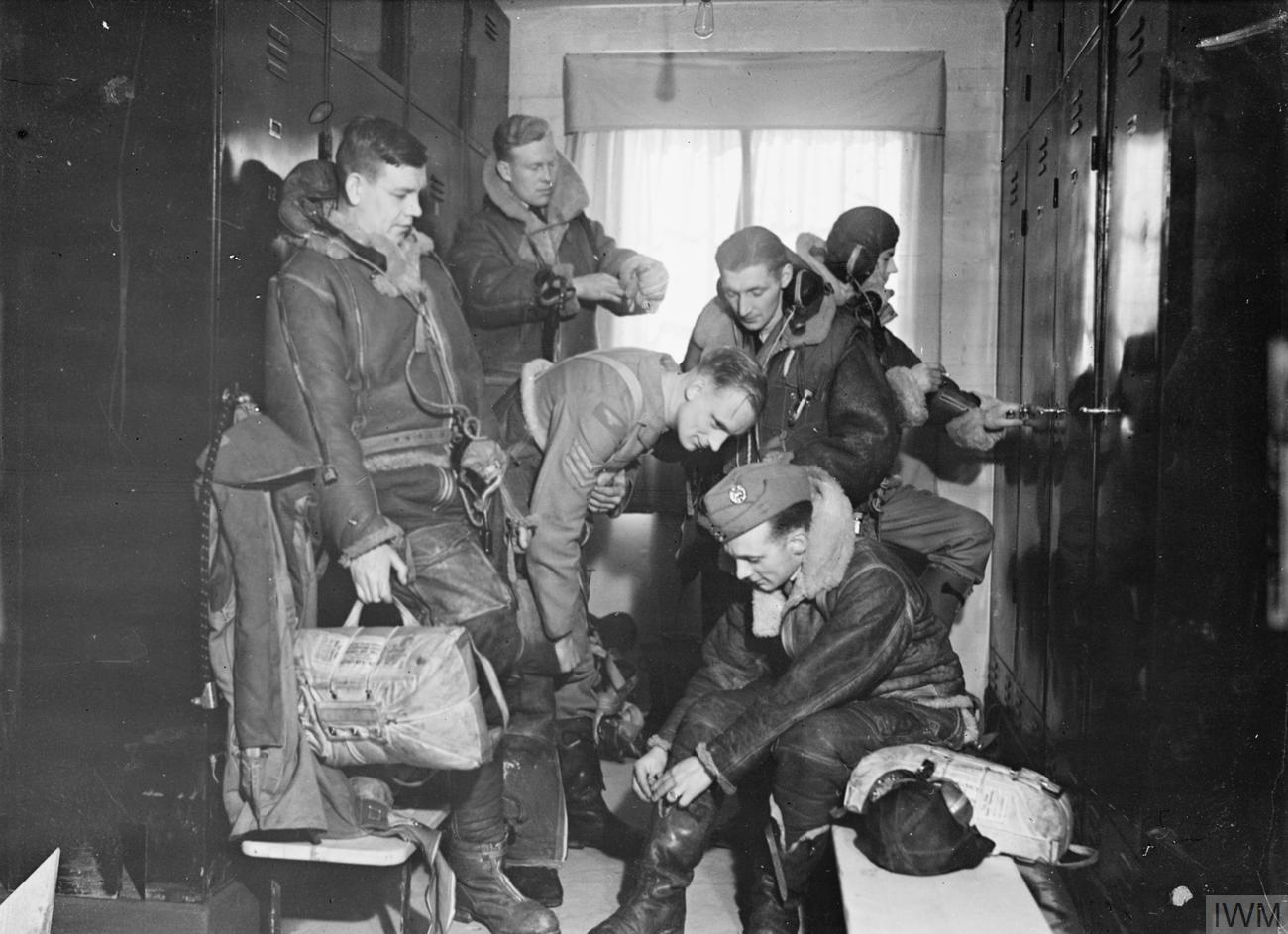
99 Squadron Wellington air crew at RAF Waterbeach prepare for a night raid on Berlin

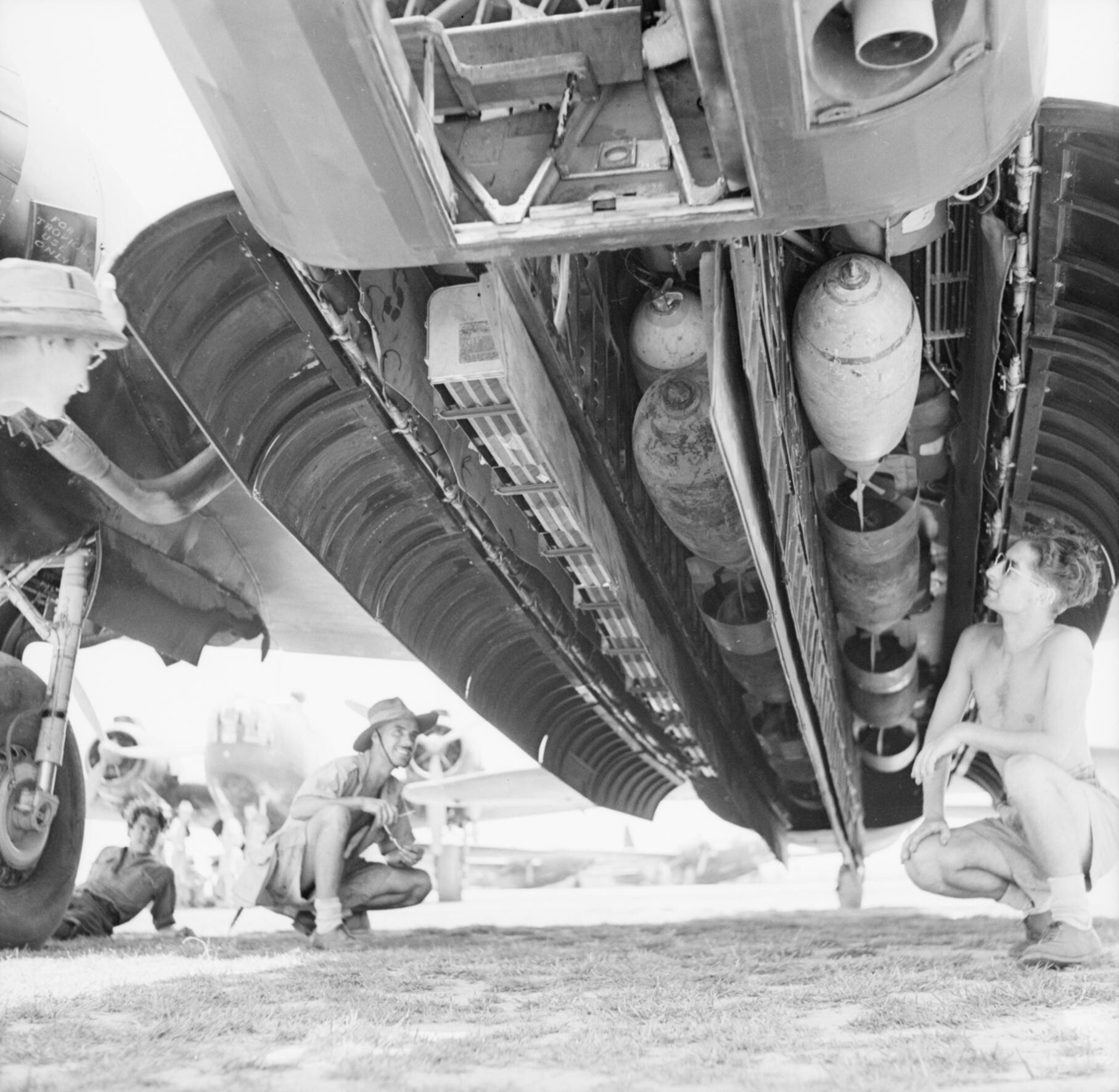
Ground crew check the bomb load on a 99 Squadron Wellington at Jessore, India, prior to a sortie over Burma

No. 99 Squadron was the first unit to be equipped with Vickers Wellingtons, just before the start of World War II. It flew its first operational mission of the war on the night of 8/9 September 1939, when three Wellingtons set off from Mildenhall to drop leaflets over Germany. The squadron temporarily dispersed to RAF Elmdon (now Birmingham Airport) the next day before moving to a more permanent new home at RAF Newmarket, Suffolk on 15 September. On 14 December 1939, 12 Wellingtons of the squadron set off for an armed reconnaissance of the Schillig Roads, hoping to attack a force of German warships spotted by a British submarine the previous night. While the formation encountered the German warships, the cloud base was too low to bomb the ships, and five of the bombers were lost over the North Sea, one shot down by anti-aircraft fire, three by German fighters and one lost in a collision. A further Wellington crashed on return to base. The squadron was a part of No. 3 Group RAF, Bomber Command and bombed targets in Norway and Germany, mainly at night. It moved to the newly established base at RAF Waterbeach in March 1941.

In February 1942 No. 99 Squadron moved to India with the Wellingtons, and resumed operations in November 1942 against Japanese bases in Burma. From September 1944 the squadron re-equipped with Consolidated Liberators which allowed it to reach targets in Thailand and Malaya. During this period, the squadron included a significant number of Royal Australian Air Force (RAAF) and Royal Canadian Air Force aircrew personnel, attached to it under the British Commonwealth Air Training Plan. The squadron moved to the Cocos Islands in August 1945 to prepare for the planned invasion of Malaya. After the Japanese surrender the squadron disbanded there on 15 November 1945.

=== Post-War ===
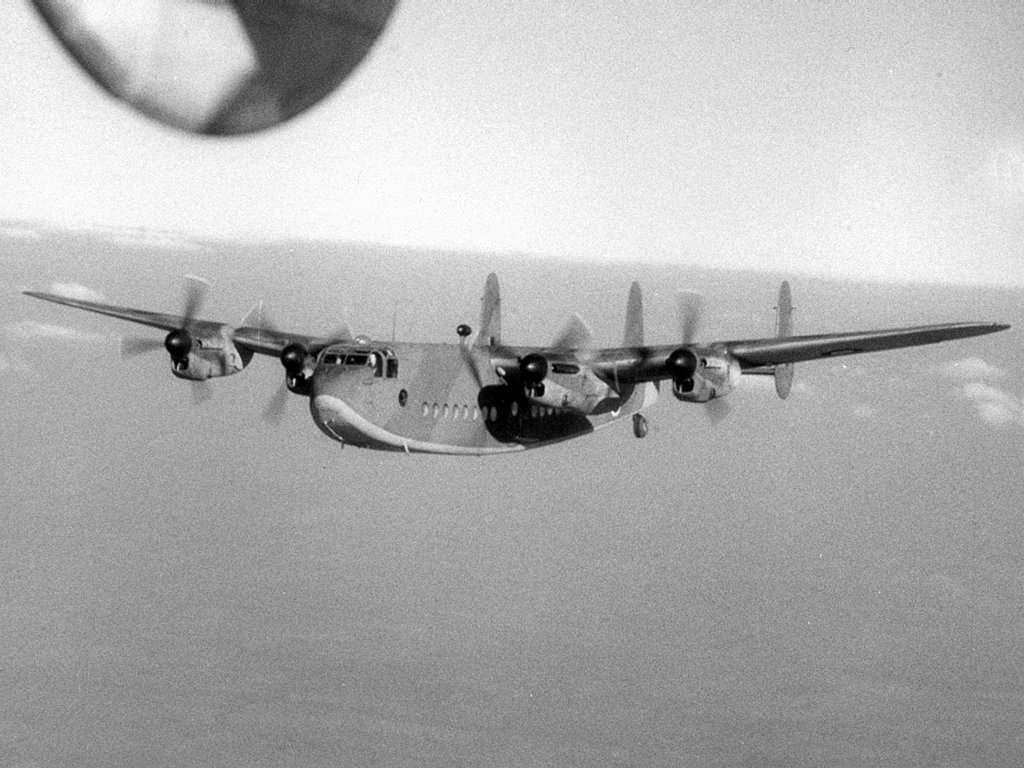
An Avro York

No. 99 Squadron was reformed again on 17 November 1945 at RAF Lyneham, Wiltshire, as a transport squadron, equipped with the Avro York. In that rôle it contributed to the Berlin Airlift.

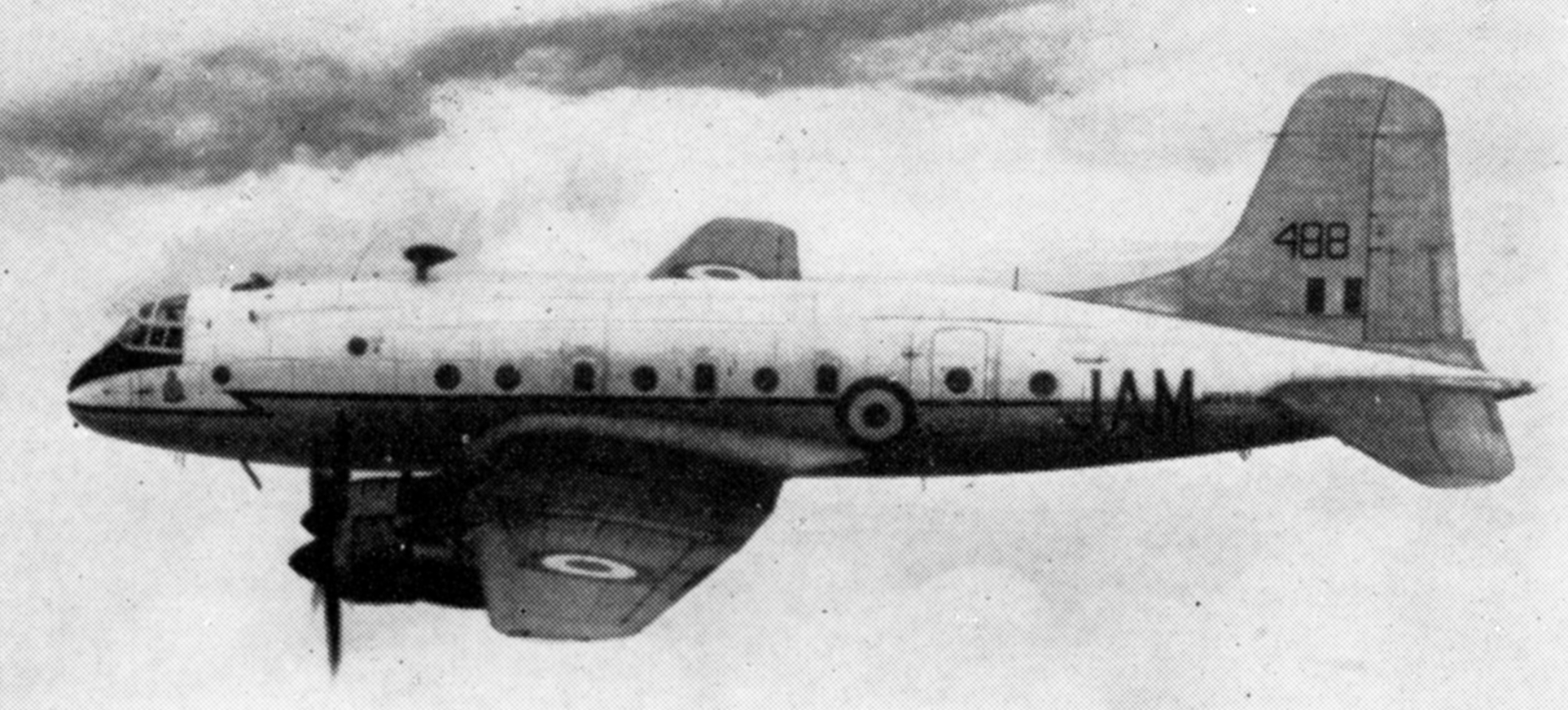
A Handley Page Hastings C.2

The unit continued in the transport role from 1949 to 1959 with the Handley Page Hastings, which was normally used as a transport aircraft but, as the squadron also had a tactical support role, was also used in 1956 to drop paratroops on Gamil Airfield during the Suez Crisis.

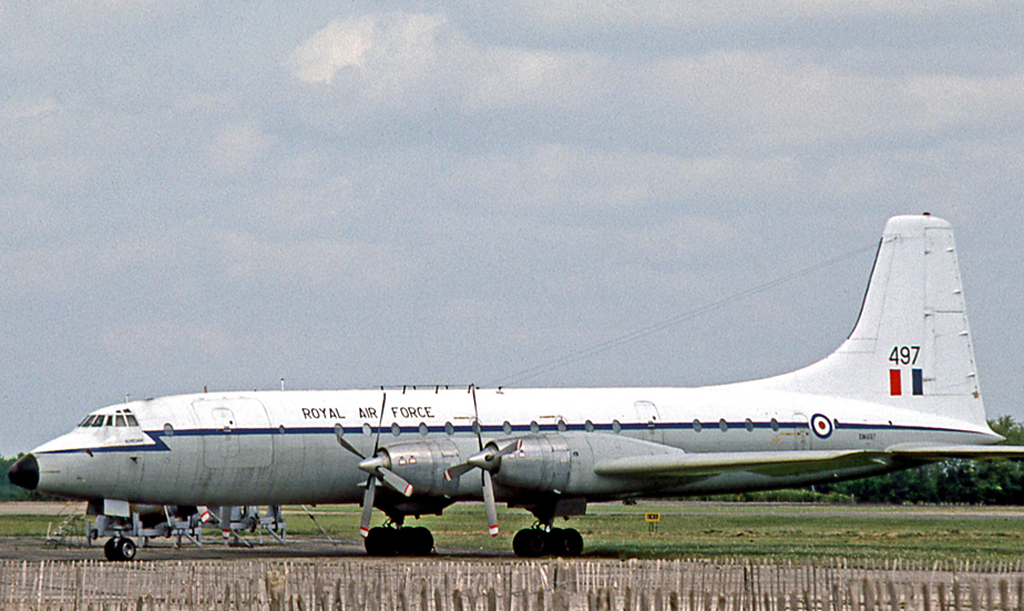
Bristol Britannia C.1 of 99 Squadron in 1976

From 1959 the squadron flew the Bristol Britannia, initially from Lyneham, then from RAF Brize Norton, Oxfordshire, from June 1970. The unit put the new long range turboprop aircraft to use to evacuate citizens from troublespots all over the world such as Congo 1960, Kuwait 1961, Belize 1961 and Aden 1967. The Squadron was disbanded on 6 January 1976, following the 1974 Defence White Paper.

=== C-17 Globemaster III (2000–present) ===
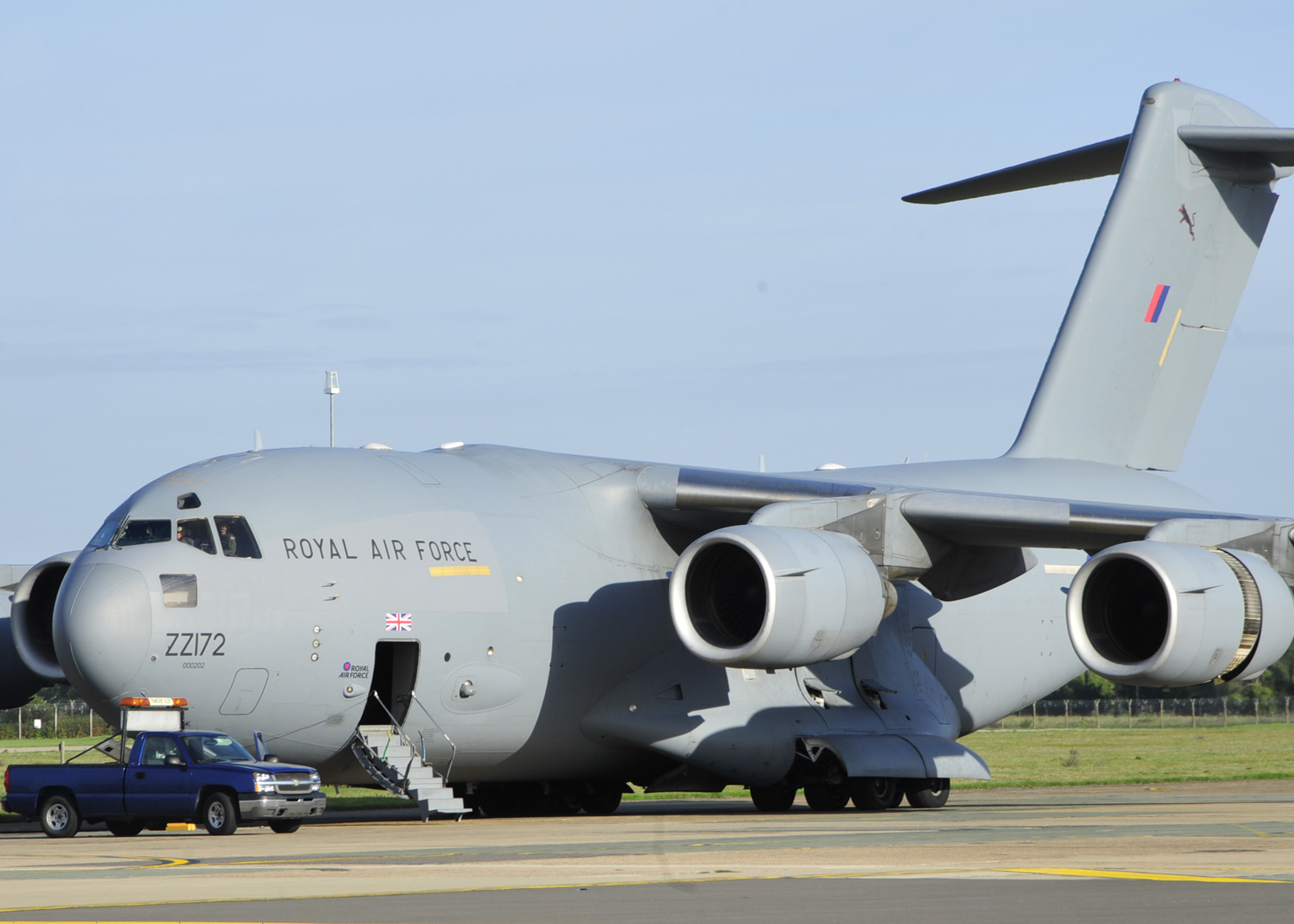
A No. 99 Squadron C-17 during August 2010

No. 99 Squadron was reformed again in November 2000, to operate the RAF's Boeing C-17 Globemaster IIIs. The first of the squadron's four initial C-17s was delivered to the RAF on 17 May 2001, arriving at Brize Norton on 23 May. One of the first high-profile missions of the squadron was the deployment of Westland Lynx helicopters and support equipment to Macedonia as part of a NATO peacekeeping force. This deployment was codenamed Operation Bessemer.

Previously the RAF had to lease commercial heavy lifters such as the Antonov An-124 to return the aircraft to the UK, or launch a major logistical effort to allow a ferry flight. In any case the C-17 has proved invaluable to the RAF and in December 2009, the Ministry of Defence announced its intention to acquire a seventh aircraft. This was received by the RAF at Boeing's Long Beach, California facility on 16 November 2010. The UK announced the purchase of its eighth C-17 in February 2012.

On 13 January 2013, it was announced that two No. 99 Squadron C-17s were to be used to transport French military equipment and troops to Mali. On 15 November 2013, a C-17 of No. 99 Squadron flew to the Philippines to assist with aid efforts there after Typhoon Haiyan.

In August 2021, the C-17 was called upon to assist with Operation Pitting, the evacuation of Kabul. Four aircraft were deployed and the aircraft's normal capacity of 138 people was increased and exceeded almost every day. On 24 August there were 354 persons on board, and by the close of the evacuation, 436 stood as the new record and the greatest number of people ever flown on a single RAF aircraft.

On 13 September 2022, C-17A ZZ177 of No. 99 Squadron carried the coffin of Queen Elizabeth II from Edinburgh Airport to RAF Northolt in preparation for Her Majesty's state funeral.

== Aircraft operated ==
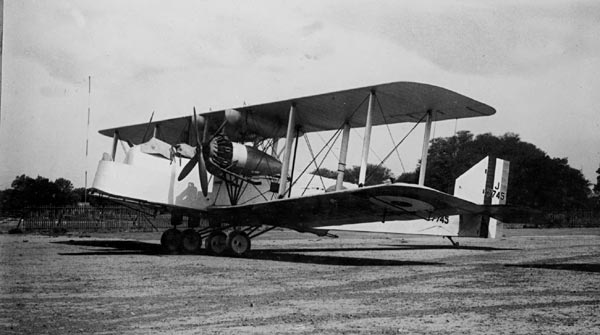
The Handley Page H.P.33 Hinaidi

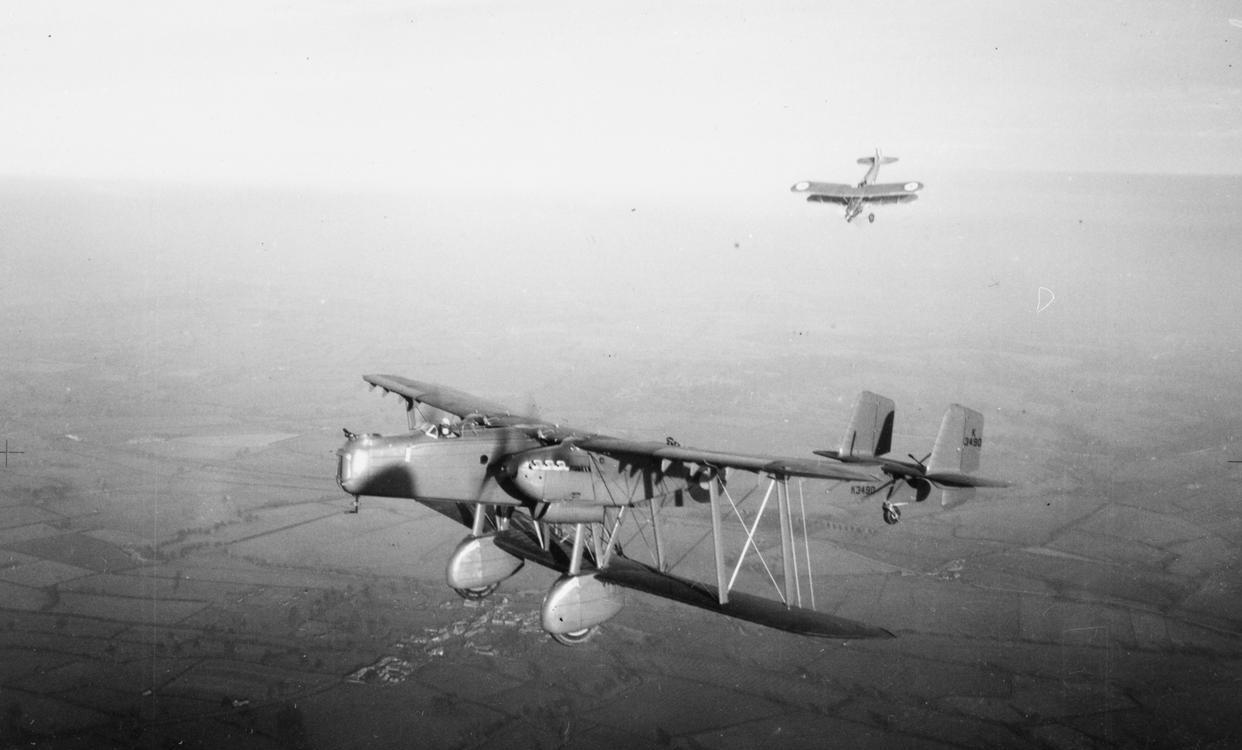
A Handley Page Heyford

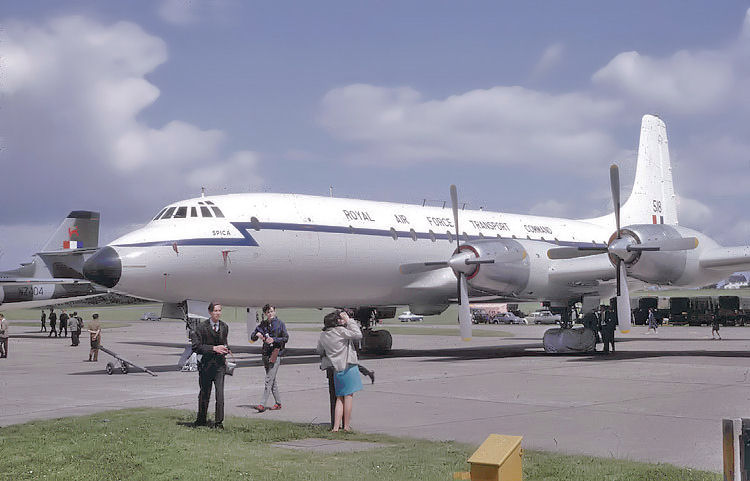
Royal Air Force Bristol Britannia at Bristol Filton Airport in 1964

Aircraft operated by No. 99 Squadron RAF, data from
From	To	Aircraft	Variant	Notes
March 1918	November 1918	de Havilland DH.9		Single-engined biplane bomber
August 1918	March 1920	de Havilland DH.9A		Single-engined biplane bomber
April 1924	December 1924	Vickers Vimy		Twin-engined biplane bomber
August 1924	December 1925	Avro Aldershot	Mk.III	Single-engined heavy bomber
December 1925	January 1931	Handley Page Hyderabad		Twin-engined biplane heavy bomber
October 1929	December 1933	Handley Page Hinaidi		Twin-engined biplane heavy bomber
November 1933	September 1937	Handley Page Heyford	Mk.I	Twin-engined biplane heavy bomber
November 1934	August 1938	Handley Page Heyford	Mk.II	Twin-engined biplane heavy bomber
December 1935	November 1938	Handley Page Heyford	Mk.III	Twin-engined biplane heavy bomber
October 1938	December 1939	Vickers Wellington	Mk.I	Twin-engined medium bomber
September 1939	April 1940	Vickers Wellington	Mk.Ia	Twin-engined medium bomber
March 1940	February 1942	Vickers Wellington	Mk.Ic	Twin-engined medium bomber
July 1941	October 1941	Vickers Wellington	Mk.II	Twin-engined medium bomber
October 1942	May 1943	Vickers Wellington	Mk.Ic	Twin-engined medium bomber
April 1943	August 1944	Vickers Wellington	Mk.III	Twin-engined medium bomber
April 1943	August 1944	Vickers Wellington	Mk.X	Twin-engined medium bomber
September 1944	November 1945	Consolidated Liberator	Mk.VI	Four-engined heavy bomber
November 1947	September 1949	Avro York	C.1	Four-engined transport
August 1949	June 1959	Handley Page Hastings	C.1	Four-engined transport
May 1952	June 1959	Handley Page Hastings	C.2	Four-engined transport
June 1959	January 1976	Bristol Britannia	C.1 and C.2	Four-engined transport
2002	Present Day	Boeing Globemaster	C-17A	Four-engined strategic transport

== Bases ==
Bases and airfields used by no. 99 Squadron RAF, data from
From	To	Base	Remark
15 August 1917	30 August 1917	RAF Yatesbury, Wiltshire	First formation
30 August 1917	25 April 1918	RAF Ford Farm, Wiltshire	
25 April 1918	3 May 1918	St. Omer, France	
3 May 1918	5 June 1918	Tantonville, France	
5 June 1918	16 November 1918	Azelot, France	
16 November 1918	29 November 1918	Auxi-le-Chateau, France	
29 November 1918	12 December 1918	St. André-aux-Bois, France	
12 December 1918	1 May 1919	Aulnoye, France	
1 May 1919	15 June 1919	en route to British India	
15 June 1919	30 September 1919	Ambala, Haryana, British India	
30 September 1919	2 April 1920	Mianwali, Punjab, British India	Det. at Kohat, North-West Frontier Province
1 April 1924	31 May 1924	RAF Netheravon, Wiltshire	Second formation
31 May 1924	5 January 1928	RAF Bircham Newton, Norfolk	
5 January 1928	15 November 1934	RAF Upper Heyford, Oxfordshire	
15 November 1934	2 September 1939	RAF Mildenhall, Suffolk	
2 September 1939	8 March 1941	RAF Newmarket, Suffolk	Det. at RAF Lossiemouth, Moray, Scotland on loan to Coastal Command Nov–Dec 1939; Det. at Salon, France, June 1940
8 March 1941	12 February 1942	RAF Waterbeach, Cambridgeshire	
12 February 1942	1 June 1942	en route to British India	
1 June 1942	12 September 1942	Ambala, Haryana, British India	Re-formed here. Dets at Solan, Punjab, British India and Pandaveswar, Bengal, British India
12 September 1942	24 October 1942	Pandaveswar, Bengal, British India	
24 October 1942	3 April 1943	Digri, Bengal, British India	
3 April 1943	14 June 1943	Chaklala, Punjab, British India	
14 June 1943	27 August 1944	Jessore, Bengal, British India	Dets. at Argatala, Twipra Kingdom and Kumbhirgram, Assam, British India
27 August 1944	1 August 1945	RAF Dhubalia, Bengal, British India	
1 August 1945	15 November 1945	RAF Cocos Islands, Straits Settlements	
17 November 1947	16 June 1970	RAF Lyneham, Wiltshire	Third formation. Det. at RAF Wunstorf, Germany during Berlin Blockade
16 June 1970	7 January 1976	RAF Brize Norton, Oxfordshire	
1 January 2002	present	RAF Brize Norton, Oxfordshire	Fourth formation

== Commanding officers ==
Officers commanding no. 99 squadron RAF, data from
From	To	Name
15 August 1917	11 March 1918	Capt. A.M. Swyny
11 March 1918	5 November 1918	Maj. L.A. Pattinson, MC, DFC
5 November 1918	2 April 1920	Maj. C.R. Cox, AFC
23 April 1924	4 September 1925	S/Ldr. G.R.M. Reid, DSO, MC
4 September 1925	1 October 1925	S/Ldr. L.T.N. Gould, MC, DFC
1 October 1925	3 April 1927	S/Ldr. W.J. Ryan, CBE
3 April 1927	26 July 1929	W/Cdr. B.E. Smithies, DFC
26 July 1929	19 November 1929	W/Cdr. W.B. Hargreaves, OBE
19 November 1929	19 February 1930	S/Ldr. G.H. Cock
19 February 1930	1 August 1932	W/Cdr. H.G. Smart, CBE, DFC, AFC
1 August 1932	13 January 1934	W/Cdr. E.D. Johnson, AFC
13 January 1934	1 January 1936	W/Cdr. F.J. Linnell, OBE
1 January 1936	21 June 1937	W/Cdr. H.N. Drew, OBE, AFC
21 June 1937	26 September 1939	W/Cdr. H.E. Walker, MC, DFC
26 September 1939	29 June 1940	S/Ldr. J.F. Griffiths, DFC
29 June 1940	16 January 1941	W/Cdr. R.J.A. Ford
16 January 1941	12 December 1941	W/Cdr. F.W. Dixon-Wright, DFC
12 December 1941	14 June 1942	W/Cdr. P. Heath
14 June 1942	25 April 1943	W/Cdr. J.B. Black, OBE, DFC
25 April 1943	11 June 1943	S/Ldr. C.L.M. Schräder
11 June 1943	15 March 1944	S/Ldr. R.G. Maddox, AFC
15 March 1944	24 May 1944	S/Ldr. A.S.R. Ennis, DSO, AFC
24 May 1944	3 September 1944	S/Ldr. P.R. O'Connor, DFC
3 September 1944	23 April 1945	W/Cdr. L.B. Ercolani, DSO, DFC
23 April 1945	15 November 1945	W/Cdr. A. Webster, DSO, DFC
17 November 1947	6 May 1949	S/Ldr. G.V. Ridpath, DFC
6 May 1949	10 June 1950	S/Ldr. S.E. Pattinson, DFC
10 June 1950	3 May 1951	S/Ldr. W.G. James
3 May 1951	14 September 1952	W/Cdr. B.C. Bennett, AFC
14 September 1952	17 July 1954	S/Ldr. K.B. Orr
17 July 1954	27 April 1956	S/Ldr. R.F.B. Powell
27 April 1956	27 May 1957	S/Ldr. D.R. Ware, DFC, AFC
27 May 1957	9 January 1959	S/Ldr. T.M. Stafford
9 January 1959	5 October 1959	W/Cdr. J.O. Barnard, OBE
5 October 1959	28 September 1961	W/Cdr. W.E.F. Grey, AFC
28 September 1961	12 November 1963	W/Cdr. P. Barber, DFC
12 November 1963	27 December 1965	W/Cdr. R.M. Jenkins, AFC
27 December 1965	1 August 1967	W/Cdr. T.L. Kennedy, AFC
1 August 1967	21 June 1969	W/Cdr. F.B. Yetman
21 June 1969	25 June 1971	W/Cdr. W.C. Milne
25 June 1971	3 September 1973	W/Cdr. F. Appleyard
3 September 1973	7 January 1976	W/Cdr. C.E. Bowles

== See also ==
- List of Royal Air Force aircraft squadrons
