= 1929 Imperial Airways Handley Page W.10 crash =

1929 ditching into the English Channel

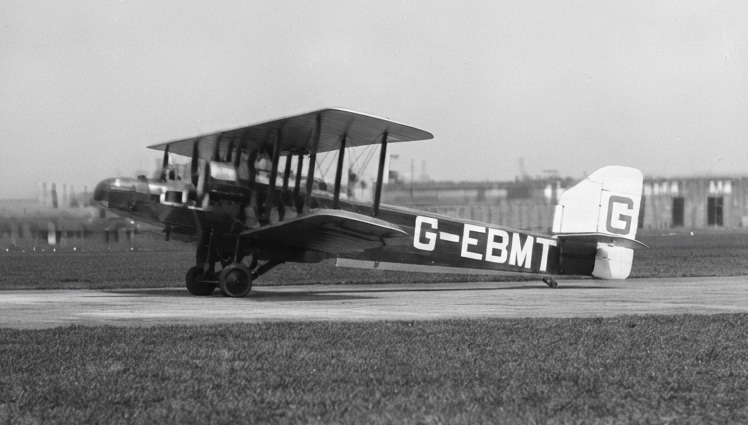
- G-EBMT, the Handley Page W.8 involved in the accident.

Accident
- Date: 17 June 1929
- Summary: Engine failure, ditching at sea
- Site: English Channel, off Dungeness; 50°45′00″N 1°07′0″E

Aircraft
- Aircraft type: Handley Page W.10
- Aircraft name: City of Ottawa
- Operator: Imperial Airways
- Registration: G-EBMT
- Flight origin: Croydon Airport, United Kingdom
- 1st stopover: Paris - Le Bourget Airport, Paris, France
- 2nd stopover: Basle Airport, Switzerland
- Destination: Zurich Airport, Switzerland
- Passengers: 11
- Crew: 2
- Fatalities: 7
- Injuries: 6
- Survivors: 6

The 1929 Imperial Airways Handley Page W.10 crash happened on 17 June 1929 when Handley Page W.10 G-EBMT suffered an engine failure and subsequently ditched in the English Channel off Dungeness with the loss of seven lives. The aircraft was operating an international scheduled flight from Croydon to Le Bourget Airport, Paris, France.

== Aircraft ==
The accident aircraft was Handley Page W.10 G-EBMT City of Ottawa, c/n W10-4. It had been delivered to Imperial Airways on 25 December 1925.

== Accident ==
G-EBMT was operating an international scheduled flight from Croydon Airport to Zurich Airport, Switzerland via Paris - Le Bourget Airport and Basel Airport, Switzerland. Having departed from Croydon at 10:30, the aircraft was some 15 miles (24 km) out over the English Channel, flying at an altitude of 2,500 feet (760 m), when a connecting rod in the starboard engine broke. A mayday was broadcast by radio and the pilot attempted to divert to Lympne Airport. As he was unable to reach land, the pilot landed in the sea some 50 yd (46 m) from the Belgian trawler Gaby, and 12 miles (19 km) offshore.

The nose of the aircraft dived into the water on landing. The passengers at the front of the aircraft were thrown from their seats and trapped. Four passengers seated at the tail of the aircraft escaped, as did both crew. Gaby went to the aid of the stricken airliner and rescued the six survivors. The body of one of the victims was also recovered. They were transferred to the Dover pilot cutter which took them to Folkestone. The cutter entered Folkestone harbour at 2:45 pm flying the signal EDY, signifying that ambulances were required, and with her Red Ensign at half-mast. The injured survivors were taken to the Royal Victoria Hospital, Folkestone. The body of the casualty was landed at Folkestone, but was later transferred to Lydd. Gaby recovered three further bodies that day. They were transferred to a motorboat owned by the Lydd postmaster and taken to a mortuary at Lydd. Gaby assisted in the salvage of the wreckage of G-EBMT. The wreckage was towed to Dungeness, where a search revealed only baggage and personal belongings of the passengers. Three victims were unaccounted for at that stage.

An inquest was opened by the Lydd Coroner on 19 June at Lydd Town Hall into the deaths of the four victims whose bodies had been recovered. Evidence was given that the pilot, Captain Brailli was experienced, with 1,000 hours flying time. He had been in the employ of Imperial Airways for a year. The aircraft was shown to have been airworthy on departure from Croydon. The pilot had been the last survivor to leave the aircraft, at his insistence. All four victims had drowned. Verdicts of "accidental death" were returned in all cases.

== Investigation ==
The Air Ministry opened an investigation into the accident under the Air Navigation (Investigation of Accidents) Regulations, 1922. The investigation opened on 25 June at the Royal Courts of Justice, London, with Sir Arthur Colefax in charge. The cause of the engine failure was the fracture of No. 4 connecting rod in the starboard engine. The engine had run for 126 hours since its last overhaul, with the permitted time between overhauls being 300 hours. The connecting rod had failed due to the failure of the big end bearing studs.

The aircraft's Certificate of Airworthiness had last been renewed in November 1928 and was valid for a year. Its maximum permissible load was 2,946 pounds (1,336 kg); the aircraft's load was 2,494 pounds (1,131 kg) on departure from Croydon. Evidence was given by three of the four surviving passengers and both crew. The fourth surviving passenger was not called as she was legally a minor at the time and had lost her father in the accident. The inquiry closed on 3 July. Imperial Airways and Napier, the engine manufacturer, were cleared of any blame for the accident. The report into the investigation was published on 12 July. Among the recommendations were that passengers should be provided with seatbelts and that aircraft not capable of maintaining level flight with an inoperative engine and not designed to land on water should be withdrawn from continental routes after 1 July 1930.

== Casualties ==
The nationalities of the casualties were -

Nationality	Crew	Passengers	Killed	Injured
English	2	6	3	5
American	–	2	1	1
Australian	–	1	1	–
Canadian	–	1	1	–
French	–	1	1	–
Total	2	11	7	6
