= SABCA S.2 =

S.2
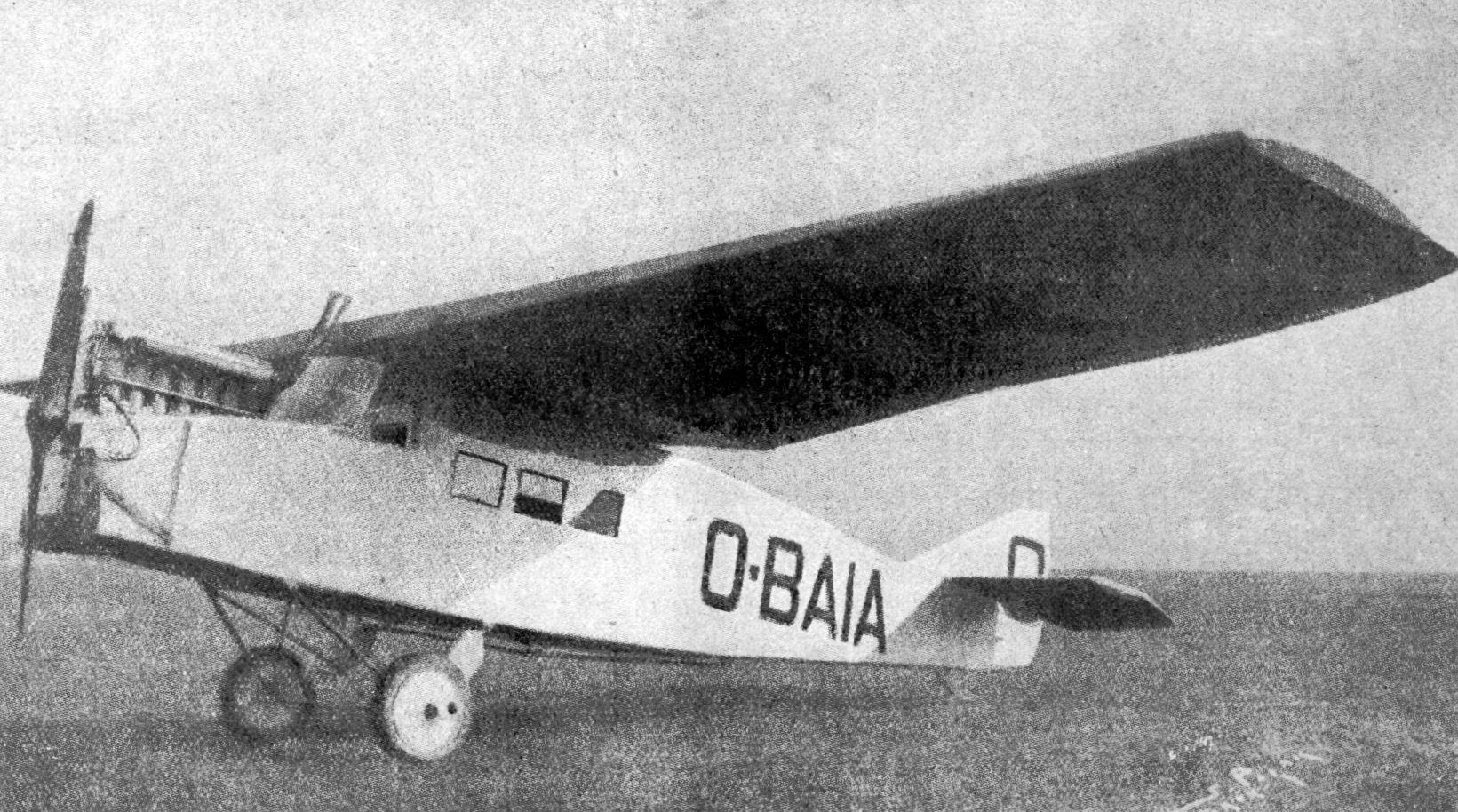

General information
- Type: Airliner
- National origin: Belgium
- Manufacturer: SABCA
- Primary user: SABENA
- Number built: 1

History
- Introduction date: 1926
- First flight: 1926; 99 years ago

The SABCA S.2 was an airliner built in Belgium in 1926.

== Design and development ==
The S.2 was a conventional, high-wing cantilever monoplane with fixed, tailskid undercarriage. The flight deck was open, but the passenger cabin was fully enclosed. Power was provided by a single engine in the nose, driving a two-blade propeller, and whose exhaust was collected in a single stack that extended up over the wing. Metal was construction throughout, with corrugated skin. Only a single example was built, which served with SABENA.

== Specifications ==
Data from Jane's all the World's Aircraft 1928.

General characteristics

- Crew: 2
- Capacity: 4 pax
- Length: 9.75 m (32 ft 0 in)
- Wingspan: 14.6 m (47 ft 11 in)
- Height: 2.12 m (6 ft 11 in)
- Wing area: 39 m^{2} (420 sq ft)
- Empty weight: 1,230 kg (2,712 lb)
- Gross weight: 2,000 kg (4,409 lb)
- Powerplant: 1 × Siddeley Puma 6-cylinder water-cooled in-line piston engine, 180 kW (240 hp)
- Propellers: 2-bladed wooden fixed-pitch propeller

Performance

- Maximum speed: 165 km/h (103 mph, 89 kn)
- Landing speed: 80 km/h (50 mph; 43 kn)
- Service ceiling: 4,500 m (14,800 ft)
- Wing loading: 51.5 kg/m^{2} (10.5 lb/sq ft)
- Power/mass: 13.598 kg/kW (17.6 lb/hp)
