= SABCA S.XII =

S.XII

General information
- Type: Four-passenger transport aircraft
- National origin: Belgium
- Manufacturer: S.A.B.C.A.
- Designer: Henri Jullien
- Number built: 1

History
- First flight: 18 September 1931

The S.A.B.C.A. S.XII or S.A.B.C.A S.12 was a four-passenger light transport aircraft with three engines and a high wing, built in Belgium in the early 1930s.

== Design and development ==
The SABCA S.XII (or S.12) was a response to a July 1930 Belgian government call and funding for an all-Belgian multi-engine aircraft able to carry a useful load of between 350–500 kg (770–1,100 lb). This was prompted by the purchase that summer by the national airline, SABENA, of four Westland Wessex trimotors. Speed, range, and cabin minimum dimensions were specified, a first flight before October 1930 was required, and two prototypes were to be built. Alfred Renard was the only other manufacturer to respond to the call. After comparing the designs of the S.XII and the Renard R.30, the official government committee was unable to choose between the two and ordered one prototype of each. Both were high wing, braced tri-motors with more power than SABENA's Wessex.

The S.XII had a braced, high, two part wing. Each half-wing was rectangular in plan out to elliptical tips. They were wooden structures, with pairs of spruce box spars and plywood skinning. Narrow-chord ailerons filled the entire trailing edges; the inner parts could also be lowered as camber-changing flaps. On each side a pair of parallel tubular struts from the lower fuselage longeron braced the wing spars. The rear struts, the longer of the two, were aluminium inside wooden streamlined metal fairings; the forward struts, which formed part of the landing gear, were steel and metal-faired.

Two of the three Renard Type 120 89 kW (120 hp), five-cylinder radial engines were mounted on frames below the wing within the bracing struts. They had long electron metal fairings behind them which contained oil tanks but their cylinder heads were exposed. The fuel tanks were contained within the wings. The third engine was in the nose of the fuselage under a metal cowling. At the aft, the fuselage was a flat-faced, rectangular section structure based on four steel longerons and fabric covered externally. Internally, there were steel plates in the floor and ceiling and the plane had aluminium walls.

The enclosed cockpit was just ahead of the leading edge of the wing; its pilot sat on the left, though there was provision for a second seat with dual controls. A passengers' cabin, with long strip windows and 2.23 m (7 ft 4 in) in length, seated four and contained a toilet and baggage space at the rear. The cabin could be easily reconfigured into a freight compartment and was accessed through a large port-side door.

Its tailplane was mounted on top of the fuselage ahead of the fin, braced by a long strut from the lower fuselage, assisted by two small, subsidiary struts from it upward to the tailplane. The incidence of the tailplane could be adjusted in flight; its one piece elevator was aerodynamically balanced and had a cut-out for rudder movement. The fin was quite small but the balanced rudder was generous and extended down to the keel; overall, both horizontal and vertical surfaces were straight-edged and round-tipped.

The S.XII had conventional, fixed tailwheel landing gear with a track of 4.10 m (13 ft 5 in). Each wheel was mounted on its own cranked axle from the lower fuselage longeron and had a rearwards drag strut from that longeron. A short, vertical Messier oleo strut was attached to the forward wing strut which was reinforced at that joint by two short struts to the fuselage side. The mainwheels had Bendix brakes and the tailwheel was castored.

The first flight of the S.XII was made by Charles Wouters on 18 September 1931. The early trials were satisfactory and continued until the beginning of 1933, when the S.XII was sold as parts without having completed its development programme. SABENA continued to operate the Wessex until about the end of 1934.

== Specifications ==
Data from Flight December 1931 Performance figures estimated.

General characteristics

- Crew: One pilot
- Capacity: Four passengers
- Length: 12.85 m (42 ft 2 in)
- Wingspan: 18.10 m (59 ft 5 in)
- Height: 3.145 m (10 ft 4 in) to upper wing surface in flight position
- Wing area: 43 m^{2} (460 sq ft)
- Empty weight: 2,014 kg (4,440 lb)
- Gross weight: 2,864 kg (6,314 lb)
- Fuel capacity: 270 kg (600 lb)
- Powerplant: 3 × Renard Type 120 5-cylinder, 7.92 L (483 cu in) radials, 89 kW (120 hp) each (rated)
- Propellers: 2-bladed

Performance

- Maximum speed: 185 km/h (115 mph, 100 kn) at ground level
- Cruise speed: 170 km/h (110 mph, 92 kn) at 80% power
- Range: 600 km (370 mi, 320 nmi)
- Landing speed: 100 km/h (62 mph) with flaps up 85 km/h (53 mph) flaps down
