= SABCA =

Belgian aerospace manufacturer

Société Anonyme Belge de Constructions Aéronautiques
- Traded as: SABCA
- Industry: Aerospace
- Founded: 1920; 106 years ago
- Headquarters: Brussels, Belgium
- Products: Aircraft
- Owners: Orizio
- Number of employees: 993 (2020)
- Website: sabca.be

SABCA (French: Sociétés Anonyme Belge de Constructions Aéronautiques, lit. 'Belgian Public Limited Company of Aeronautical Construction') is a Belgian aerospace company. Its main sectors of activity are civil aviation, space and defence.

SABCA was established during 1920. Presently, it is owned by the Belgian group Orizio, itself owned by the Société Fédérale de Participations et d'Investissement (SFPIM) (a Belgian federal holding) and Sabena Aerospace.

== History ==
During 1920, SABCA was founded with the purpose of locally designing and building aircraft to satisfy Belgium's emerging aviation requirements. Its first manufacturing site was adjacent to Haren Airport, in the suburbs of Brussels. During the Interwar period, the company produced a number of in-house designs, as well as engaging in the manufacture of both civil and military aircraft. Throughout its existence, SABCA has been a prolific user of production licenses, which have authorised the firm to build other manufacturers' aircraft. During 1926, the company constructed a total 15 Airco DH.4 light bombers.

While its operations were disrupted by the German occupation of Belgium during the Second World War, SABCA resumed operations shortly following the end of the conflict. In 1955, a new manufacturing plant was opened at Charleroi Airport. Around this same period, SABCA became involved in early European space programmes; the firm would be involved in the production of Spacelab as well as both the Ariane and Vega expendable launch systems. SABCA also cooperated with the Dutch manufacturer Fokker in the manufacture of its F27 Friendship and 50 short-haul airliners. Other civil programmes the firm was involved with include producing elements of the Dassault Mercure and VFW-Fokker 614 airliners.

Throughout the postwar era, the company was involved in the manufacturing of large numbers of licensed aircraft as well as associated upgrade programmes; such aircraft included the Hawker Hunter, the Republic F-84 Thunderjet, the Lockheed F-104G Starfighter, the Dassault Mirage 5, and the AgustaWestland AW109 helicopter. During the 1970s and 1980s, SABCA was responsible for operating one of the two European production lines for the General Dynamics F-16 Fighting Falcon; a total of 164 aircraft would be manufactured at its Gosselies facility. The European co-production initiative was officially launched on 1 July 1977; under this arrangement, Fokker-produced components were delivered to General Dynamics' Fort Worth facility for fuselage assembly, which were then shipped back to Europe for final assembly of the aircraft at the SABCA's facility; deliveries to the Belgian Air Force started in January 1979. During the following year, SABCA commenced deliveries to the Royal Norwegian Air Force.

During 1989, SABCA's involvement in the civil aviation sector received a significant boost via the first risk-sharing contract with the multinational aerospace conglomerate Airbus. It has since been a participant in all Airbus programmes, including the A380, the A400M Atlas, and the A350 XWB. SABCA also designs and manufactures subassemblies on behalf of other manufacturers, including Dassault Aviation and Gulfstream Aerospace. During 1992, demand for composite components had grown to the point where a dedicated subsidiary, SABCA Limburg, was established to focus specifically on this activity.

== Products ==
- SABCA-Julien SJ 1 - Monoplane
- Gambier-SABCA
- SABCA Castar - 1923 Monoplane, also known as the Poncelet Castar
- SABCA Camgul - 1925 single-engine biplane
- Airco DH.4 - (15 built in 1926)
- SABCA F.VII - license-built Fokker F.VII
- SABCA S.2 - 1926 single-engine airliner
- SABCA S.3 - projected monoplane trimotor transport
- SABCA S.4 - projected single-engine sesquiplane fighter
- SABCA S.11 - 1931 trimotor airliner
- SABCA S.XII - 1931 trimotor feederliner; also known as S.12
- SABCA S.13 - projected army observation aircraft
- SABCA S.14 - projected 1931 parasol-winged reconnaissance aircraft
- SABCA S.20 - 1935 cabin tourer with elliptical wings
- SABCA S.30 - 1936 parasol-winged light aircraft
- SABCA S.40 - 1939 two-seat trainer
- SABCA S.42 - projected 1938 two-seat fighter-trainer, scaled up, higher power version of S.40
- SABCA S.45 - projected license-built Caproni Ca.135
- SABCA S.46 - projected license-built Caproni Ca.310
- SABCA S.47 - license-built Caproni Ca.335
- SABCA S.48 - projected license-built Caproni Ca.312; cancelled due to the Fall of Belgium
- SABCA S.60 Planned jet trainer, not built.
- SABCA S.73 - license-built Savoia-Marchetti S.73

== Locations ==
SABCA has operations in two locations:

- Brussels - company headquarters and the main centre of operations.
- Limburg - high-performance composite component manufacturing subsidiary opened in 1989.

Before the merge with Sabena Engineering, SABCA also operated in Charleroi: military aircraft and helicopter maintenance, technical and logistic support to the customers, opened in 1955.
