= Farman MF.6 =

1910s French aircraft

MF.6

General information
- Type: Tourism biplane
- Manufacturer: Farman Aviation Works
- Designer: Maurice Farman

History
- First flight: 1911

The Maurice Farman MF.6 Shorthorn is a French tourism biplane developed by Maurice Farman before World War I.

== Operational history ==
A number of MF.6 biplanes were imported to Japan on the eve of World War I.

== Specifications ==
Data from

General characteristics

- Crew: 2
- Length: 12.00 m (39 ft 4 in)
- Wingspan: 15.50 m (50 ft 10 in)
- Height: 3.35 m (11 ft 0 in)
- Empty weight: 675 kg (1,488 lb)
- Gross weight: 850 kg (1,874 lb)
- Powerplant: 1 × Renault 8B V-8 air-cooled piston engine, 70 kW (94 hp)

Performance

- Maximum speed: 95 km/h (59 mph, 51 kn)
- Service ceiling: 4,000 m (13,000 ft)

== Bibliography ==
- Liron, Jean (1984). Les avions Farman. Collection Docavia. Vol. 21. Paris: Éditions Larivière. OCLC 37146471.
