= Armstrong Whitworth A.W.23 =

A.W.23
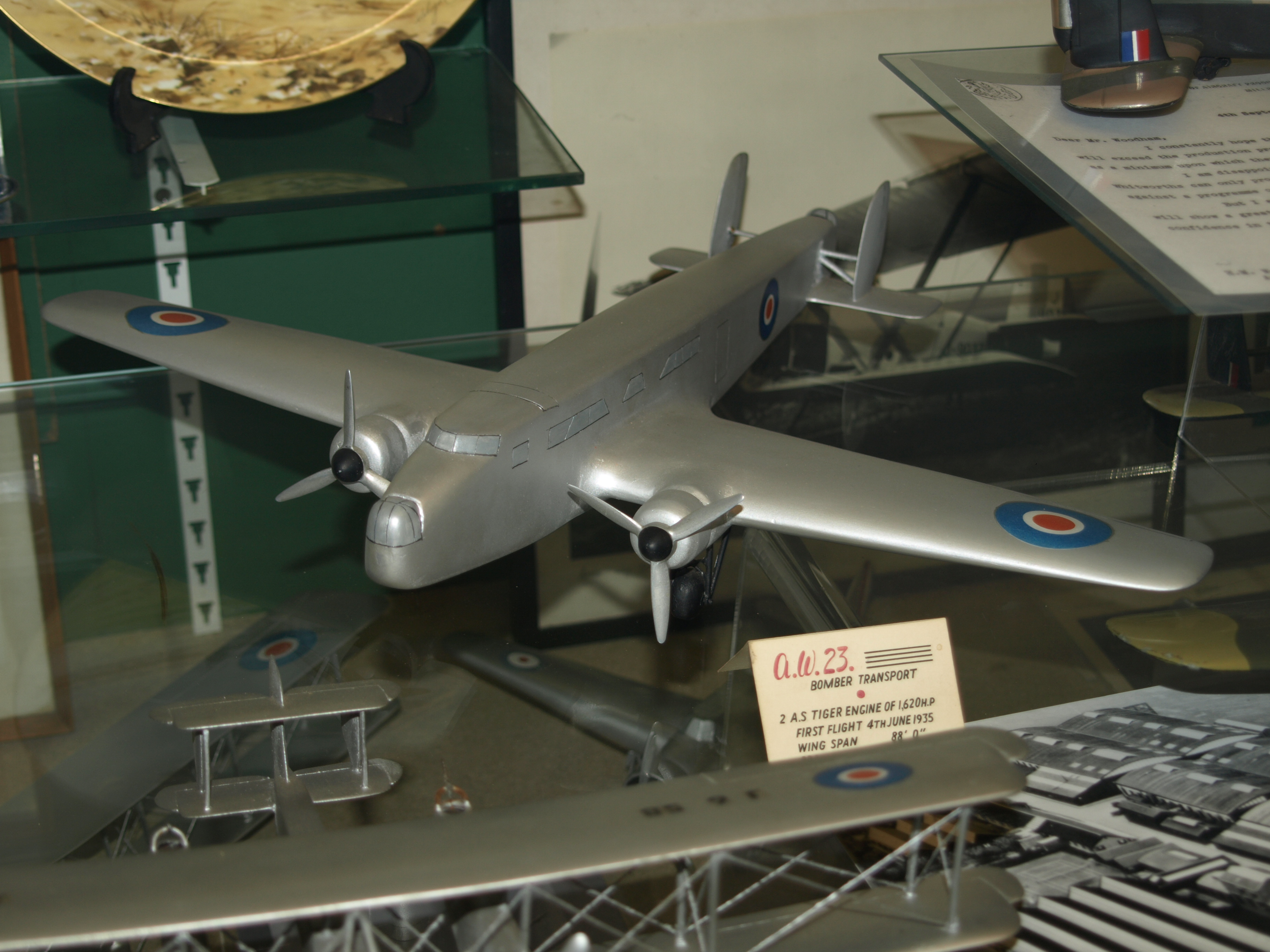
- Model of A.W. 23

General information
- Type: Bomber/transport
- Manufacturer: Armstrong Whitworth Aircraft
- Designer: John Lloyd
- Status: Destroyed
- Primary users: Royal Air Force Flight Refuelling Ltd
- Number built: 1

History
- Manufactured: 1935
- First flight: 1935
- Retired: 1940
- Developed into: Armstrong Whitworth Whitley

The Armstrong Whitworth A.W.23 was a prototype bomber/transport aircraft produced to specification C.26/31 for the British Air Ministry by Armstrong Whitworth Aircraft. While it was not selected to meet this specification, it did form the basis of the later Armstrong Whitworth Whitley aircraft.

== Design and development ==
Specification C.26/31 required a dual-purpose bomber/transport aircraft for service with the Royal Air Force (RAF), with the specification stressing the transport part of its role. The A.W.23 was designed by John Lloyd, chief designer of Armstrong Whitworth to meet this specification, competing with the Handley Page H.P.51 and the Bristol Bombay.

The A.W.23 was a low-wing twin-engine monoplane, powered by two Armstrong Siddeley Tiger engines. It had a fabric covered braced steel fuselage accommodating a large cabin to fulfil its primary transport role but with room for internal bomb racks under the cabin floor. The wings used a novel structure, patented by Armstrong Whitworth, of a massive light alloy box-spar braced internally with steel tubes. This structure was extremely strong but required a thick wing section, increasing drag. This wing structure was re-used in the Armstrong Whitworth Whitley bomber. The A.W.23 was the first Armstrong Whitworth Aircraft to be fitted with a retractable undercarriage.

A prototype, K3585, was built first flying on 4 June 1935. Owing to its unreliable Tiger engines, its delivery to the RAF for testing was delayed, with the Bombay being declared the winner of the specification. The prototype was given the civil registration G-AFRX in May 1939 being used for inflight refuelling development by Flight Refuelling Ltd who used it with the Short Empire flying boat. It was used in February 1940 for the world's first night refuelling experiments. It was destroyed in a German bombing raid on Ford airfield in June 1940.

== Operators ==
United Kingdom

- Flight Refuelling Ltd
- Royal Air Force

== Specifications (A.W.23) ==
Data from The British Bomber since 1914.

General characteristics

- Crew: 4
- Capacity: 23 troops
- Length: 80 ft 9 in (24.61 m)
- Wingspan: 88 ft 0 in (26.82 m)
- Height: 19 ft 6 in (5.94 m)
- Wing area: 1,308 sq ft (121.5 m^{2})
- Gross weight: 24,100 lb (10,932 kg)
- Powerplant: 2 × Armstrong Siddeley Tiger VI 14-cylinder radial engines, 810 hp (600 kW) each

Performance

- Maximum speed: 162 mph (261 km/h, 141 kn) TAS at 6,500 ft (2,000 m)
- Range: 790 mi (1,270 km, 690 nmi) (estimated)
- Service ceiling: 18,100 ft (5,500 m)
- Time to altitude: 10 min 50 s to 10,000 ft (3,000 m)

Armament

- Guns: Provision for a machine-gun in nose and tail turrets
- Bombs: Provision for 2,000 lb (910 kg) bombs internally

== See also ==
Related development

- Armstrong Whitworth Whitley

Aircraft of comparable role, configuration, and era

- Bristol Bombay
- Handley Page Harrow

Related lists

- List of aircraft of the Royal Air Force

== Bibliography ==
- Gardner, Brian (1984). "Flight Refuelling... The Wartime Story". Air Enthusiast. No. 25. pp. 34–43, 80. ISSN 0143-5450.
- Jackson, A. J. (1973). British Civil Aircraft since 1919. Vol. I. London: Putnam. ISBN 0-370-10006-9.
- Mason, Francis K (1994). The British Bomber since 1914. London: Putnam Aeronautical Books. ISBN 0-85177-861-5.
- Tapper, Oliver (1988). Armstrong Whitworth Aircraft since 1913. London: Putnam. ISBN 0-85177-826-7.
