= Jean Demozay =

French flying ace of WWII

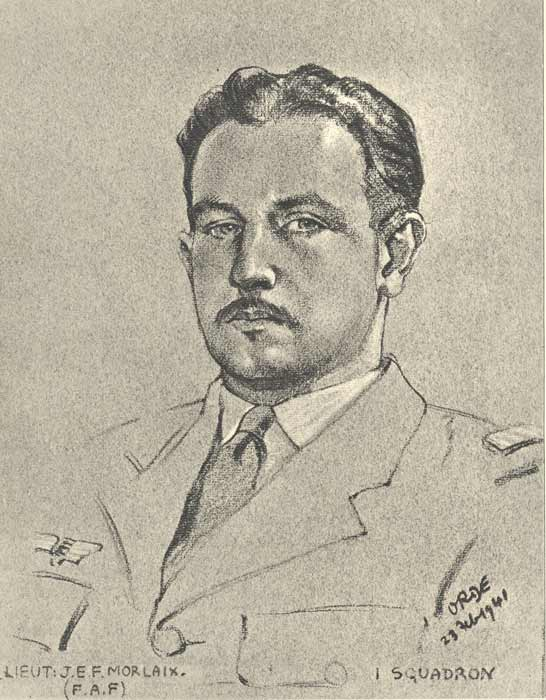
- Portrait of Demozay, under his pseudonym Jean Morlaix, made by Cuthbert Orde in 1941
- Born: 21 March 1916; Nantes, France
- Died: 19 December 1945 (aged 29); Les Loges-en-Josas, France
- Burial place: Beaugency, France
- Military career
- Allegiance: France
- Branch: Forces Aériennes Françaises Libres (FAFL); Royal Air Force (RAF)
- Rank: Lieutenant Colonel (FAFL); Wing commander (RAF)
- Commands: Groupement Patrie (FAFL); No. 91 Squadron (RAF)
- Conflicts: Second World War: Battle of Britain; Circus offensive
- Awards: Distinguished Service Order; Distinguished Flying Cross & Bar; Croix de Guerre (France); Croix de Guerre (Belgium)

Jean Demozay DSO, DFC & Bar (21 March 1916 – 19 December 1945), also known as Jean Francois Morlaix, was a Frenchman who served in the Royal Air Force (RAF) during the Second World War. He was credited with having destroyed at least eighteen German aircraft.

Born in Nantes, Demozay received a portion of his education in the United Kingdom and became proficient in English. Working in the family business, he took up flying. In the early stages of the Second World War, he was an interpreter for RAF forces in France. Attached to No. 1 Squadron at the time of the Battle of France in May 1940, he was left behind at Nantes airfield when its flying personnel was evacuated. Using an abandoned Bristol Bombay transport aircraft, he flew himself and several RAF groundcrew back to the United Kingdom. Claiming to be a fighter pilot, he joined the Free French Air Forces (Forces Aériennes Françaises Libres – FAFL) and was posted back to No. 1 Squadron as a pilot, making his first claim for an aerial victory in November. Several more followed in 1941, while serving with Nos. 1, 242 and 91 Squadrons. He commanded the latter unit for over six months in 1942, claiming his final victories during this time. For much of the remainder of the war, he held training and command posts for the FAFL. He was killed in an aircraft accident to the south of Paris in late 1945.

== Early life ==
Jean Demozay was born on 21 March 1916 in Nantes, France, the son of Lucien Demozay, a businessman, and his wife. He was schooled in Nantes, at Saint-Joseph du Loquidy College. He was then sent to England for further education, at St John's College in Portsmouth. In 1932 his father died and this necessitated Demozay's abandoning his studies and returning to Nantes to take his father's place at the family firm. In 1936, Demozay joined the French Air Force (l'Armee de l'Air) but was quickly invalided out. He then took up civil flying.

== Second World War ==
On the outbreak of the Second World War in September 1939, Demozay volunteered to assist the French war effort. On account of his English-language skills he was seconded to the Royal Air Force (RAF) as an interpreter, initially at its headquarters at Reims and then in December, with No. 67 Wing. He was appointed interpreter to No. 1 Squadron in January 1940. The squadron, which operated Hawker Hurricane fighters, had been sent to France as part of the Advanced Air Striking Force dispatched by the RAF soon after the start of the war.

=== Battle of France ===
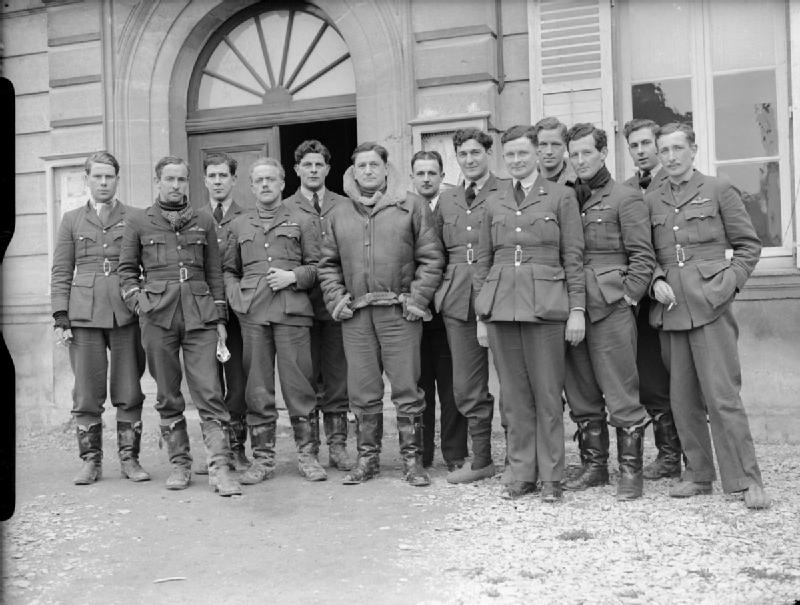
Pilots of No. 1 Squadron at their base in France, 1940. Squadron Leader Halahan stands in the centre, wearing a leather jacket with Demozay standing behind his right shoulder

Once the German invasion of France commenced on 10 May, No. 1 Squadron was heavily engaged and over the following weeks began to retreat, repeatedly shifting from airfield to airfield. Ending up at Nantes airfield, its flying personnel were eventually evacuated to England on 18 June. Demozay was left behind with several RAF groundcrew who were expected to be transported by road to La Rochelle. However, a Bristol Bombay transport aircraft was left on the airfield; although it had mechanical issues with its tail wheel, it was fully fueled. The fault with the aircraft was quickly remedied and Demozay flew it and 16 groundcrew to the RAF station at Sutton Bridge in England.

Once in England, Demozay made his way to the headquarters of the Free French Air Forces (Forces Aériennes Françaises Libres – FAFL), where he claimed to be a fighter pilot and requested to fly with the RAF. At the time, French airmen were enlisted into the Royal Air Force Volunteer Reserve (RAFVR) although they remained in the FAFL. On 9 September Demozay was enlisted under the name 'Jean Francois Morlaix'; this was a strategy to protect his family in German-occupied France. After attending No. 5 Operational Training Unit at Aston Down for familiarisation on Hurricanes, on 16 October Demozay was posted back to No. 1 Squadron. The unit was now based at Wittering for rest and recuperation after being heavily engaged in the Battle of Britain but soon began training in night fighter operations. Demozay made his first claim, for a damaged Junkers Ju 88 medium bomber to the east of Sutton Bridge, on 8 November.

=== Circus offensive ===
After a few months, No. 1 Squadron moved south to Croydon, from where it began to be involved in offensive operations to France as part of the RAF's Circus offensive. Demozay shot down a Messerschmitt Bf 109 fighter south of Hastings on 24 March. On a nighttime sortie on 10 May, he destroyed a Heinkel He 111 medium bomber over London's East India Docks. In an engagement around 20 miles (32 km) east of South Foreland, Demozay shot down a Messerschmitt Bf 110 heavy fighter on 25 May. By this time he was a flight lieutenant and was commanding one of the squadron's flights.

On 21 June, Demozay was posted to No. 242 Squadron. This was another Hurricane-equipped unit, based at North Weald, and engaged in convoy patrols along the east coast of England and bomber escort duties. The following day he destroyed a Bf 109 over the English Channel. This was followed on 23 June with Demozay's destruction of another Bf 109, this time in the vicinity of Desvres in northern France. He was posted away from the squadron on 29 June, his new assignment being a flight commander with No. 91 Squadron.

His new unit was equipped with Supermarine Spitfire Mk Vb fighters and, flying from Hawkinge and Lympne, was tasked with intercepting incoming Luftwaffe aircraft as well as offensive sorties to France and attacks on shipping. On one sortie to Boulogne in France, carried out on 10 July, Demozay probably destroyed a Henschel Hs 126 reconnaissance aircraft and damaged a second, both on the ground. Nearly a week later, on 16 July, he probably destroyed a Bf 109 to the southeast of Dover. The next day he attacked a German minesweeper and the damage he inflicted with his strafing caused its sinking. He shot down a Bf 109 near Calais on 26 July and five days later destroyed two more Bf 109s, and damaged a third, over Dunkirk.

On 9 August Demozay destroyed a Bf 109 4 miles (6.4 km) to the north of Calais. Another Bf 109 was shot down and a second damaged by Demozay on 29 August, both in the region between Calais and Cap Gris-Nez. He shot down two Bf 109s near Cap Blanc-Nez on 13 September, although one of these was deemed to have only been probably destroyed. Demozay was responsible for the destruction of two Bf 109s, on 16 September and 9 October respectively, both in the vicinity of Calais. He shot down another Bf 109 on 1 November to the north of Cap Gris-Nez. On a sortie to strafe an airfield in Calais on 25 November, he caught several Bf 109s on the ground, claiming the destruction of one and damaging two more. Before the end of the year he was awarded the Distinguished Flying Cross (DFC). His final aerial victory before being rested was on 2 January 1942, when he destroyed a Bf 109 off Boulogne.

After spending six months at the headquarters of No. 11 Group, Demozay returned to operations with a posting as the commanding officer of his former unit, No. 91 Squadron, on 25 June. The month after his return he was awarded a Bar to his DFC. During the Dieppe Raid of 19 August, Demozay's squadron was tasked with patrolling the Channel; he led one of its final patrols of the day. During a sortie on 23 September, he destroyed a Focke Wulf 190 fighter to the northwest of Gris-Nez. On the last day of October he shot down two Fw 190s and damaged a third, all near Calais. He was recognised for his leadership of the squadron with the Distinguished Service Order.

=== Later war service ===
In February 1943 Demozay was sent to North Africa where he was tasked with establishing a flight training facility for pilots of the FAFL. Over a year later he returned to the United Kingdom and was employed at the Free French Air Ministry. He was subsequently dispatched to Russia as part of a military mission. In August 1944 he was appointed commander of Groupement Patrie, a FAFL bomber group tasked with attacking German positions that were cut off by the Allied ground forces as they advanced into France. In the immediate postwar period he was deputy commander of the flying training schools in France. He was killed on 19 December 1945, when the Siebel Si 204 transport aircraft in which he was traveling crashed at Les Loges-en-Josas, south of Paris. At the time of his death, he was a wing commander in the RAFVR and lieutenant colonel in the French Air Force. He is buried at Beaugency near Orleans.

Demozay received a number of French honours, including the Croix de Guerre, the Order of Liberation, and the Legion d'Honneur, as well as foreign decorations: in addition to his British awards, he received the Belgian Croix de Guerre, the Czech War Cross, and the American Distinguished Flying Cross. He is credited with having shot down eighteen aircraft. Two further aircraft were probably destroyed and four more damaged. He is also credited with having destroyed one aircraft on the ground, along with one more probably destroyed and three damaged.
