= Handley Page H.P.43 =

Three-engined biplane bomber-transport

H.P.43
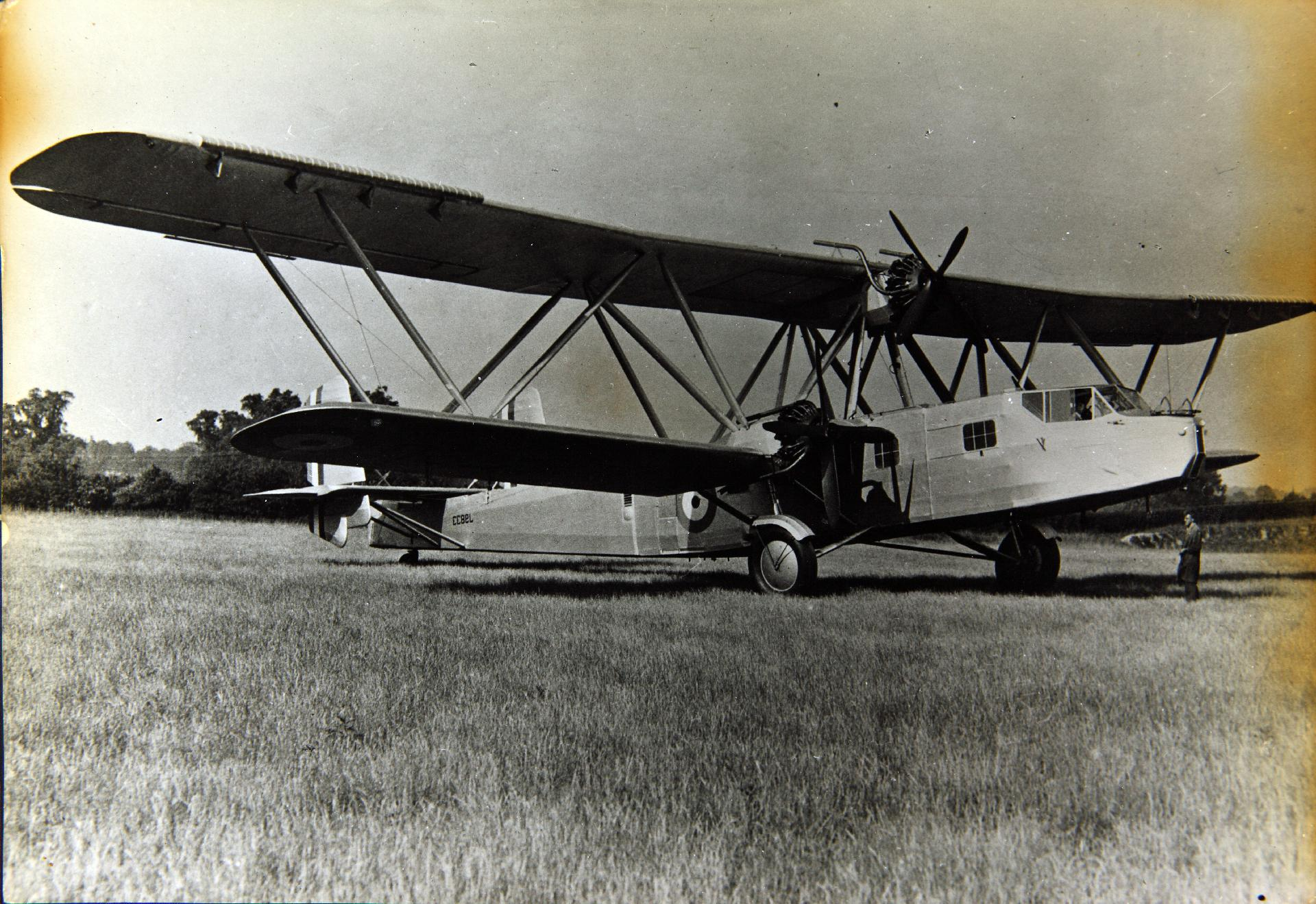

General information
- Type: Bomber/transport
- National origin: United Kingdom
- Manufacturer: Handley Page
- Designer: George Volkert
- Number built: 1

History
- First flight: 21 June 1932
- Variant: Handley Page H.P.51

The Handley Page H.P.43 was a three-engined biplane bomber-transport built to an Air Ministry specification. It did not fly well and the biplane configuration was out-dated at completion; the only one constructed was later turned into a monoplane and led to the Handley Page H.P.54 Harrow.

== Design and development ==
In 1928 Imperial Airways issued two sets of tenders, one for a large four-engined airliner and the other for a smaller, three-engined one. The first led to the very successful Handley Page H.P.42 but the second type did not get beyond the design stage as Imperial later decided that they did not want it. Nonetheless, when Air Ministry specification C.16/28 was issued, calling for a replacement bomber-transport for the Handley Page Clive and Vickers Victoria, Handley Page offered a design which used the tri-motor's wings and engine mountings married to a new monocoque fuselage with gun positions and a revised tail. The Air Ministry ordered a prototype with the proviso that it should have a more familiar fabric covered and gauze windowed fuselage of tubular construction. This aircraft was the H.P.43. Only two other manufactures had submitted types in competition: the Vickers Type 163 was accepted as a private venture only and the Gloster TC.33 prototype was ordered after the specification had been widened to include four-engined types.

Like the H.P.42, the H.P.43 was an unequal-span biplane with unswept and unstaggered wings of constant chord. Both used a Warren girder biplane construction, with two pairs of strongly outward-leaning struts linked by an inward-leaning pair on each wing. This layout avoided the need for bracing wires. Both types had dihedral on upper and lower outer wing sections, combined with marked anhedral in the centre section of the lower wing, a feature that optimised the view from the passenger aircraft because the wing was attached to the top of the fuselage and kept the single-wheeled undercarriage legs, mounted at the end of the centre section, short and widetrack. The lower pair of engines were also mounted at this point, on top of the wing. Both types carried ailerons and leading edge slots on the upper wing only. In contrast, not only did the H.P.43 have a smaller span (114 ft compared with 130 ft on the H.P.42) but the upper and lower planes had nearly equal chord, unlike the sesquiplane H.P.42. The H.P.43's third Bristol Pegasus IM3 radial engine was mounted centrally on the upper wing with bracing to the upper fuselage longerons.

The H.P.43 fuselage was slab-sided, tapering slightly to the tail. The nose extreme housed an open gunner's position with a bomb aimer's window below, immediately in front of an enclosed, side-by-side cockpit for the pilot and navigator. There was a wireless operator's position behind them. The H.P.43 was required to be a 30-seat troop carrier, so there were seats, windows and a port side door amidships. The tail gunner sat in another open position at the end of the fuselage, aft of a twin-finned monoplane tail unit. The elevators were large and projected well beyond the fixed horizontal tail.

The H.P.43 flew for the first time at Radlett on 21 June 1932. After some modifications it went to RAF Hendon in June 1933, where it was not well received by pilots from RAF Martlesham Heath who found it lacking performance and heavy on the controls. During its construction the RAF saw the H.P.43 as outmoded and set to be replaced by monoplane bomber and transport designs; surprisingly the H.P.43 took part in this transition when its fuselage and empennage were adapted to take a high monoplane wing bearing two engines and emerge as the H.P.51, the forebear of the Harrow.

== Specifications ==
Data from Barnes & James 1987, pp. 327

General characteristics

- Crew: three-four
- Capacity: 30 troops
- Length: 75 ft 9 in (23.1 m)
- Wingspan: 114 ft 0 in (34.8 m)
- Empty weight: 13,550 lb (6,150 kg)
- Gross weight: 22,500 lb (10,210 kg)
- Powerplant: 3 × Bristol Pegasus IM3 9-cylinder radial , 650 hp (485 kW) each

Performance

- Maximum speed: 118 mph (190 km/h, 103 kn)
- Range: 1,200 mi (1,930 km, 1,000 nmi)

Armament

- 1× 0.303 in (7.7 mm) machine gun on Scarff no.12 ring in nose position
- 1× 0.303 in (7.7 mm) machine gun on Scarff no.12 ring in tail position

== See also ==
- Handley Page H.P.51
- Handley Page H.P.54 Harrow
