= Bristol Bombay =

British WWII troop transport aircraft

Type 130 Bombay
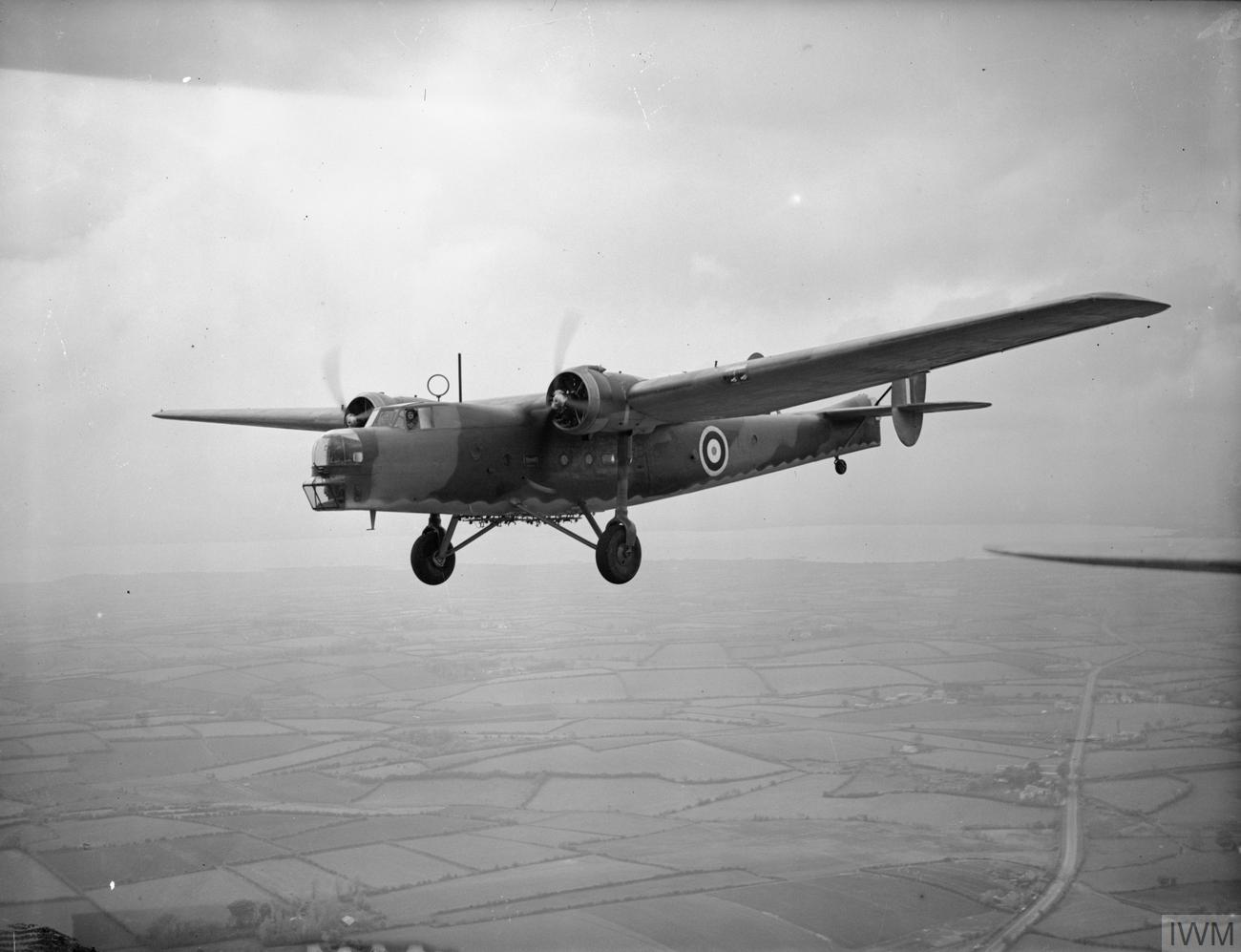
- Bombay Mark I L5838 in flight.

General information
- Type: Transport aircraft
- National origin: United Kingdom
- Manufacturer: Bristol Aeroplane Company
- Primary users: Royal Air Force Royal Australian Air Force
- Number built: 51

History
- Manufactured: 1939
- Introduction date: 1939
- First flight: 23 June 1935
- Retired: 1944

The Bristol Bombay was a British troop transport aircraft adaptable for use as a medium bomber flown by the Royal Air Force (RAF) during the Second World War.

== Design and development ==
The Bristol Bombay was built to Air Ministry Specification C.26/31 which called for a monoplane bomber-transport aircraft to replace the Vickers Valentia biplane in use in the Middle East and India. The aircraft was required to be capable of carrying 24 troops or an equivalent load of cargo as a transport, while carrying bombs and defensive guns for use as a bomber. This dual-purpose design concept was common to British pre-war designs. Other entries for the specification were the Armstrong Whitworth A.W.23 and the Handley Page HP.51.

Bristol's design, the Type 130, was a high-wing cantilever monoplane of all-metal construction. Bristol's previous monoplane design, the 1927 Bagshot, had suffered from lack of torsional rigidity in the wings leading to aileron reversal. This led to an extensive research program at Bristol which resulted in a wing design with a stressed metal skin rivetted to an internal framework consisting of multiple spars and the ribs. This was the basis of the Bombay's wing, which had seven spars, with high-tensile steel flanges and alclad webs. The aircraft had a twin-tail and a fixed tailwheel undercarriage.

The aircraft's crew consisted of a pilot, who sat in an enclosed cockpit, a navigator/bomb-aimer, whose working position was in the nose, and a radio-operator/gunner, who divided his time between the radio operator's position behind the cockpit and a gun turret in the nose. When the aircraft was operated as a bomber, an additional gunner was carried to man the tail gun position. In the prototype, this position was equipped with a Lewis gun on a Scarff ring but in production aircraft, both gun positions were hydraulically operated gun turrets each armed with a Vickers K machine gun. Eight 250-pound (110 kg) bombs could be carried on racks under the fuselage.

A prototype Type 130 was ordered in March 1933 and first flew on 23 June 1935, powered by two 750 horsepower (560 kW) Bristol Pegasus III radial engines driving two-bladed propellers. Testing was successful and an order for 80 was placed as the Bombay in July 1937. These differed from the prototype in having more powerful (1,010 hp (750 kW)) engines driving three-bladed Rotol variable-pitch propellers, discarding the wheel spats fitted to the undercarriage main wheels in the prototype. As Bristol's Filton factory was busy building the more urgent Blenheim light bomber, the production aircraft were built by Short & Harland (owned by Short Brothers and Harland and Wolff) of Belfast. The complex nature of the Bombay's wing delayed production at Belfast. The first Bombay was not delivered until 1939 and the last 30 were cancelled.

== Operational history ==
The first production Bombay flew in March 1939, with deliveries to No. 216 Squadron RAF based in Egypt beginning in September that year. Although it was outclassed as a bomber for the European theatre, it saw some service with British-based 271 Squadron ferrying supplies to the British Expeditionary Force in France in 1940. In June 1940, French pilot Jean Demozay used an abandoned Bombay to ferry himself and 15 troops from France to England, after which he became an ace with the RAF.

The Bombay's main service was in the Middle East, particularly with 216 Squadron, which operated most of the Bombays built at some stage. When the war with Italy began in June 1940, in the absence of more modern aircraft, 216 Squadron's Bombays were used as night bombers as well as in their principal role as transport aircraft. The design bombload of 250 lb (110 kg) bombs under the fuselage was supplemented by improvised bombs thrown out of the cargo door by hand. The aircraft flew bombing sorties against targets in the Western Desert, including Benghazi and Tobruk, and against Italian Somaliland, until the buildup of Vickers Wellington bombers in Egypt allowed the Bombays to concentrate on transport operations.

As transports, they ferried supplies and evacuated the wounded during the Siege of Tobruk, and on 2 May 1941, Bombays of 216 Squadron evacuated the Greek Royal Family from Crete to Egypt. Later that month, Bombays played an important role in ferrying troops during the Anglo-Iraqi War. Five Bombays were used by the fledgling Special Air Service (SAS) in their first official operation in the Middle East, a parachute drop on five forward German aerodromes on 17 November 1941.

Lieutenant General William Gott, the highest ranking British officer killed in the war, died when a Bombay piloted by Hugh James in which he was being carried was shot down in the Western Desert on 7 August 1942. He was about to assume command of Eighth Army from General Claude Auchinleck who had been removed as Commander-in-Chief Middle East and had been directing the Army directly after dismissing its commander Neil Ritchie. His death opened the way for General Bernard Montgomery to take over.

Bombays evacuated over 2,000 wounded during the Allied invasion of Sicily in 1943, and one crew was credited with carrying 6,000 casualties from Sicily and Italy before the type was finally withdrawn from use in 1944.

== Variants ==
- Type 130 : Prototype.
- Type 130A Bombay Mk I : Twin-engined medium bomber and troop transport aircraft. Original designation Type 130 Mark II.
- Type 137A Proposed civil transport version. Unbuilt.
- Type 137B Combi version of Type 137A. Unbuilt.
- Type 144 Unbuilt development with retractable undercarriage proposed for Specification B.4/34 (won by Handley Page Harrow).

== Operators ==
Australia

- Royal Australian Air Force
  - No. 1 Air Ambulance Unit RAAF

United Kingdom

- Royal Air Force
  - No. 117 Squadron RAF formed from C Flight of 216 Squadron in Apr 1941 and used the Bombay until November 1941 at Khartoum
  - No. 216 Squadron RAF used the Bombay from October 1939 to May 1943 and based in Egypt (Heliopolis, El Khnaka and Cairo West)
  - No. 271 Squadron RAF used the Bombay from May 1940 to February 1941 at RAF Doncaster, England

== Specifications (Bombay Mk.I) ==
Data from The British Bomber since 1914

General characteristics

- Crew: 3-4
- Capacity: 24 armed troops or 10 stretchers
- Length: 69 ft 3 in (21.11 m)
- Wingspan: 95 ft 9 in (29.18 m)
- Height: 19 ft 11 in (6.07 m)
- Wing area: 1,340 sq ft (124 m^{2})
- Empty weight: 13,800 lb (6,260 kg)
- Gross weight: 20,180 lb (9,153 kg)
- Powerplant: 2 × Bristol Pegasus XXII 9-cylinder air-cooled radial piston engines, 1,010 hp (750 kW) each
- Propellers: 3-bladed variable-pitch propellers

Performance

- Maximum speed: 192 mph (309 km/h, 167 kn)
- Cruise speed: 160 mph (260 km/h, 140 kn)
- Ferry range: 2,230 mi (3,590 km, 1,940 nmi) with overload fuel
- Rate of climb: 750 ft/min (3.8 m/s)
- Wing loading: 14.9 lb/sq ft (73 kg/m^{2})
- Power/mass: 0.10 hp/lb (0.16 kW/kg)

Armament

- Guns: 2 × 0.303 in (7.7 mm) Vickers K machine guns in both manually-operated nose and tail turrets.
- Bombs: 2,000 lb (907 kg) as 8 × 250 lb (113 kg) bombs on underfuselage racks

== See also ==
Related development

- Bristol Type 170 Freighter — the first air ferry. (The Bristol Freighter's wing was based on that of the Type 130.)

Aircraft of comparable role, configuration, and era

- Handley Page Harrow
- Armstrong Whitworth A.W.23
- Dornier Do 23
- Douglas C-47 Skytrain
- Savoia-Marchetti SM.81

Related lists

- List of aircraft of World War II
- List of aircraft of the RAF
- List of bomber aircraft
