= Handley Page H.P.54 Harrow =

World War II British heavy bomber aircraft

H.P.54 Harrow
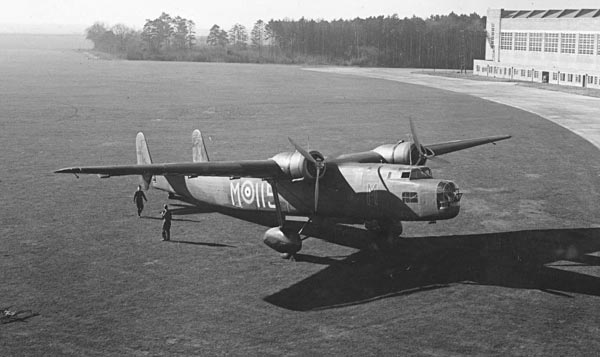
- Harrow of No. 115 Squadron

General information
- Type: Heavy bomber
- Manufacturer: Handley Page
- Designer: G. V. Lachmann
- Primary users: Royal Air Force Royal Navy; Royal Canadian Air Force
- Number built: 100

History
- Manufactured: 1936–1937
- Introduction date: 1937
- First flight: 10 October 1936
- Retired: 1945
- Developed from: Handley Page H.P.51

The Handley Page H.P.54 Harrow was a heavy bomber designed and produced by the British aircraft manufacturer Handley Page. It was operated by the Royal Air Force (RAF) and used during the Second World War, although not as a bomber.

The Harrow was developed during the 1930s as a derivative of the Handley Page H.P.51, an unsuccessful monoplane bomber-transport hybrid. It was a twin-engine, high-wing monoplane with a fixed undercarriage. In 1935, the Air Ministry wrote Specification B.29/35 around the Harrow proposal, seeking a 'stop-gap' heavy bomber to facilitate the expansion of the RAF's bomber squadrons. Handley Page updated the design with new features and along with structural changes to enable more rapid construction. Despite incorporating several modern features, including hydraulically-powered turrets, steam-based cabin heating, and variable-pitch propellers, the performance of the Harrow did not match that of contemporary bombers such as the Armstrong Whitworth Whitley.

On 14 August 1936, the Air Ministry ordered one hundred Harrows for the RAF. While the Fleet Air Arm also placed a separate order for one hundred Harrows, Handley Page did not have the capacity to produce these aircraft. On 13 January 1937, the first Harrow was delivered to No. 214 Squadron; by the end of that same year, all one hundred of the RAF-bound units had been delivered. By the end of 1939, the Harrow had been rapidly displaced as a frontline bomber, it was flown as a transport aircraft instead, which included its use as an air ambulance. It participated in several major actions, including an unorthodox defensive role for The Blitz in the winter of 1940–1941 and Operation Market Garden in September 1944. Limited numbers served through to the conclusion of the conflict, the RAF withdrew the Harrow in May 1945.

== Development ==
=== Background ===
The H.P. 54 Harrow was the production version of the earlier Handley Page H.P.51 design, itself a monoplane conversion of the three-engined Handley Page H.P.43 biplane. The two monoplanes were designed by Dr. Gustav Lachmann. The aviation author C. H. Barnes observes that, despite rumours to the contrary, the development of the Harrow had nothing to do with Air Ministry Specification B.9/32, for a specialist medium bomber; several features of the aircraft, such as its fixed undercarriage and general construction, were incompatible with the requirements laid out. Instead, the aircraft had been developed for the Specification C.26/31, which sought a new bomber-transport aircraft. Handley Page had intended to offer the preceding H.P.51, before opting for the H.P.54 at the last minute as it was viewed as a superior offering to fulfil the requirement.

Recognising that production of existing bombers, such as the Armstrong Whitworth Whitley, or upcoming projects be reasonably accelerated, the Air Ministry came to recognise that additional types of aircraft would have to be procured if it was to keep pace with political pressures to equip the Royal Air Force, which was undergoing a period of rapid expansion and modernisation, including the growth of its bomber force, as the situation in Europe deteriorated. In June 1935, Specification B.29/35 was written around the Harrow as a 'stop-gap'; it was directed to be suitable for rapid production despite its performance not being equal to front-line peers. The use of the aircraft as bomber was emphasised by B.29/35 over that of its transport capability, although this was retained as a secondary role.

To fulfil the specification, which sought the Harrow as a heavy bomber, the design had to be reworked, largely in terms of its structure. Several new features were introduced, including variable-pitch propellers, steam boilers to heat the cabin and hydraulically-powered turrets. Modern construction methods drawn from studies of American automotive factories were adopted, which included a sub-assembly flow system and priority being placed on a high standard of practical training. On 14 August 1936, months before the first Harrow flew, the Air Ministry opted to place a production order for one hundred aircraft. The Fleet Air Arm also placed its own order for another hundred but Handley Page found that it lacked the production capacity to supply them. Quantity production of the Harrow commenced shortly after production of the Handley Page Heyford biplane came to an end.

=== Into flight ===
On 10 October 1936, the first Harrow performed the type's maiden flight from Radlett. Service trials of the type commenced at RAF Martlesham Heath twenty days later using this same aircraft. During January 1937, the second Harrow, which differed from the first by its fitting of the improved Bristol Pegasus XX radial engine, along with prototype Habbart-F.N. turrets, arrived for armament trials. In March 1937, following the forced landings of seven Heyfords in bad weather, it was ordered that improved navigator positions be adopted on all bombers wherever feasible, leading to urgent modifications being performed on all Harrows. To speed deliveries, and to allow time to get the hydraulically powered turrets working properly, early production units were delivered to training squadrons without their turrets.

The Harrow was typically furnished with several defensive guns, including a powered nose and tail turrets as well as a manually operated dorsal turret. These positions had fixed cupolas that had the guns traverse on a slot; the hydraulic controls were linked with the gun sight, while the weight of the guns was balanced by the gunner. Bomb-airming was performed using the nose turret, which incorporated a flat optical panel. Early on, the nose and dorsal turrets were each armed with a Lewis gun, while the tail turret had two. In later service, these guns were typically replaced by Vickers K machine guns. The Harrow could carry a maximum bomb load of 3,000 lb (1,400 kg), which was stowed in a bay directly underneath the floor of the cabin; it was also capable of carrying a 2,000 lb (910 kg) bomb. The majority of Harrows were powered by a pair of Bristol Pegasus XX radial engines, capable of producing up to 925 hp (690 kW).

== Operational history ==
On 13 January 1937, the first Harrow was delivered to 214 Squadron at RAF Scampton. Early examples, powered by the Bristol Pegasus X engine, were called Harrow Mk.I, while those powered by the more powerful Pegasus XX engine were named Harrow Mk.II. By the end of 1937, all one hundred aircraft had been delivered to a total of five RAF bomber squadrons. Despite the presence of cabin heating, which used the exhaust head of onboard steam boilers, the Harrow gained a reputation amongst air crews of being a cold and draughty aircraft, which was largely attributed to the design of its turrets.

Two of No. 214 Squadron's new Harrows from RAF Feltwell collided in mid-air over Wissington, Norfolk and crashed with the loss of five airmen on 29 April 1937. It was reported that a wing-tip of one aircraft contacted the tail of the other, one falling into a field and bursting into flames, and the other crashing into the River Wissey.

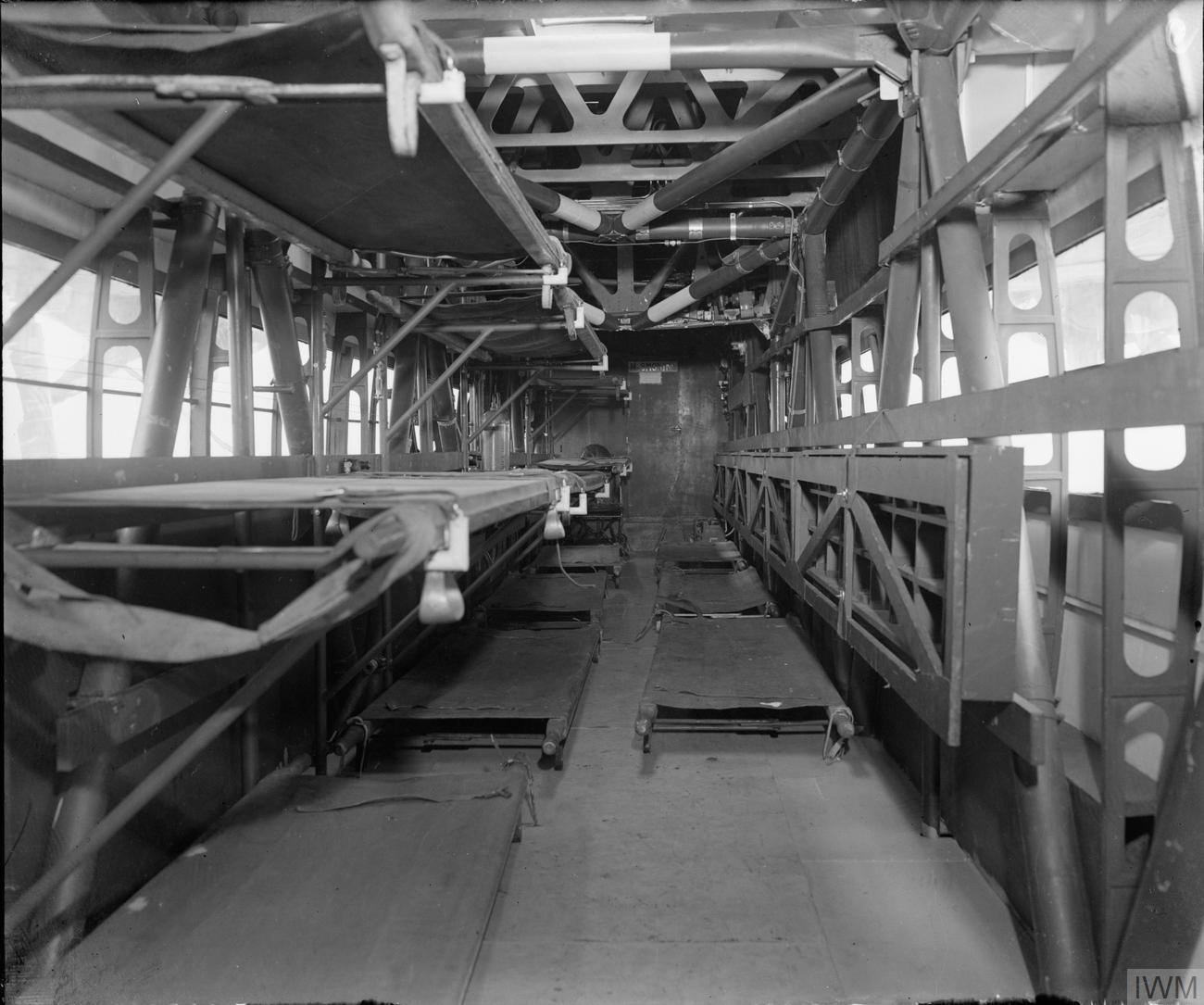
Interior of an Harrow with air ambulance fittings installed c. 1943.

As the delivery of more modern bombers, such as the Vickers Wellington proceeded, the Harrow was withdrawn from front line bomber squadrons by the end of 1939, having never performed any combat missions in this capacity. Perhaps its most prominent use during this brief period was a series of public formation flights performed over various British cities to mark Empire Air Day in May 1938; the Harrow was also put on stand-by during the Munich Crisis of 1938.

Although relegated as a night bomber, the Harrow operated throughout the Second World War as a transport and trainer. On 1 May 1940, 271 Squadron was formed with a mixture of Harrows, Bristol Bombays and an assortment of impressed civil aircraft. While the other aircraft equipping 271 Squadron were replaced by Douglas Dakotas, it retained a flight of Harrows (sometimes nicknamed "Sparrows" due to their new nose fairings to give a more streamlined fuselage) as transports and ambulance aircraft until VE Day.

As a transport, the Harrow was routinely used to convey equipment and personnel between domestic military bases across Britain, as well as to continental airfields prior to the Fall of France. It also occasionally undertook risky flights between England and Gibraltar; two aircraft were recorded as having been lost on this route. Harrows also operated in support of Allied forces in their advance into north-west Europe, evacuating wounded from the Arnhem operation during September 1944. Seven Harrows were destroyed by a low level attack by Luftwaffe fighters of JG 26 and JG 54 on Evere airfield as part of Unternehmen Bodenplatte, the German attack on Allied airfields in north-west Europe, on 1 January 1945, leaving only five Harrows intact. These were retired on 25 May 1945.

The Harrow also served in a novel operational role at the height of The Blitz against Britain in the winter of 1940–1941. Six Harrows equipped 420 Flight (later 93 Squadron) which used lone Harrows to tow Long Aerial Mines (LAM) into the path of German bombers. The LAM had an explosive charge on the end of a long cable and the unorthodox tactic was credited with the destruction of between four and six German bombers. The experiment was judged of poor value and the planned deployment of Douglas Havocs in the LAM role was cancelled. Seven Harrows were also used by 782 Naval Air Squadron of the Fleet Air Arm as transports from June 1941 to July 1943, being used to carry engines and spare parts as well as passengers.

The Harrow was trialled as an aerial tanker for aerial refuelling of Imperial Airways Short Empire flying boats, to enable them to cross the Atlantic with a useful payload. Three Harrows were modified by Flight Refuelling Limited, with two Harrows stationed at Gander, Newfoundland and the third based at Foynes, Ireland. Meanwhile four Empire flying boats were equipped to receive fuel by this method, and between August and September 1939, 15 trans-Atlantic crossings were made using this system. The trials came to an end with the outbreak of World War II, and the two Harrows based at Gander were pressed into service with the Royal Canadian Air Force.

== Variants ==
Harrow Mk.I
Powered by two 830 hp (620 kW) Bristol Pegasus X engines, 19 built.
Harrow Mk.II
Powered by two 925 hp (690 kW) Pegasus XX engines, 81 built.

== Operators ==
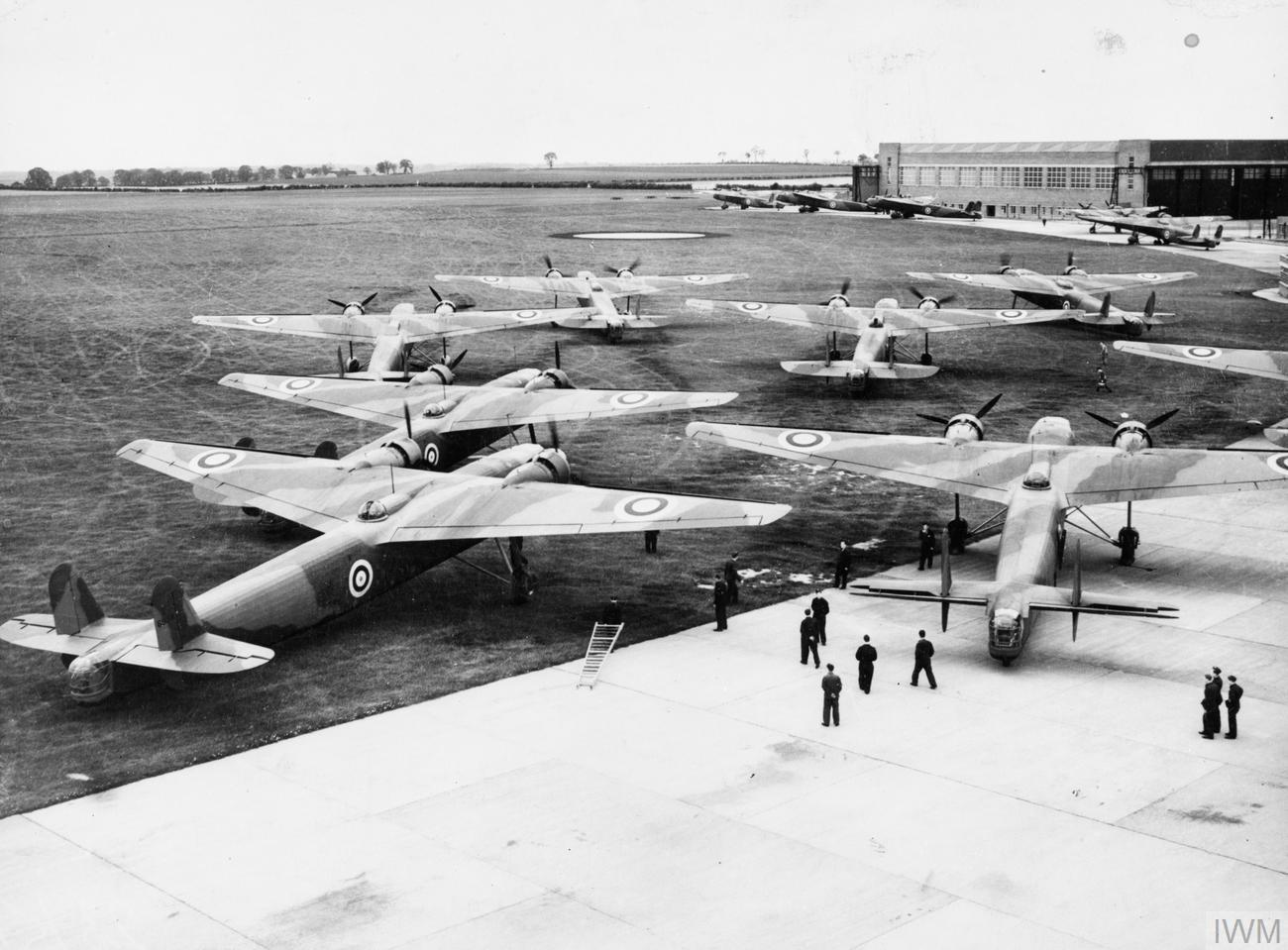
Harrows of No. 214 Squadron at RAF Feltwell, circa 1938

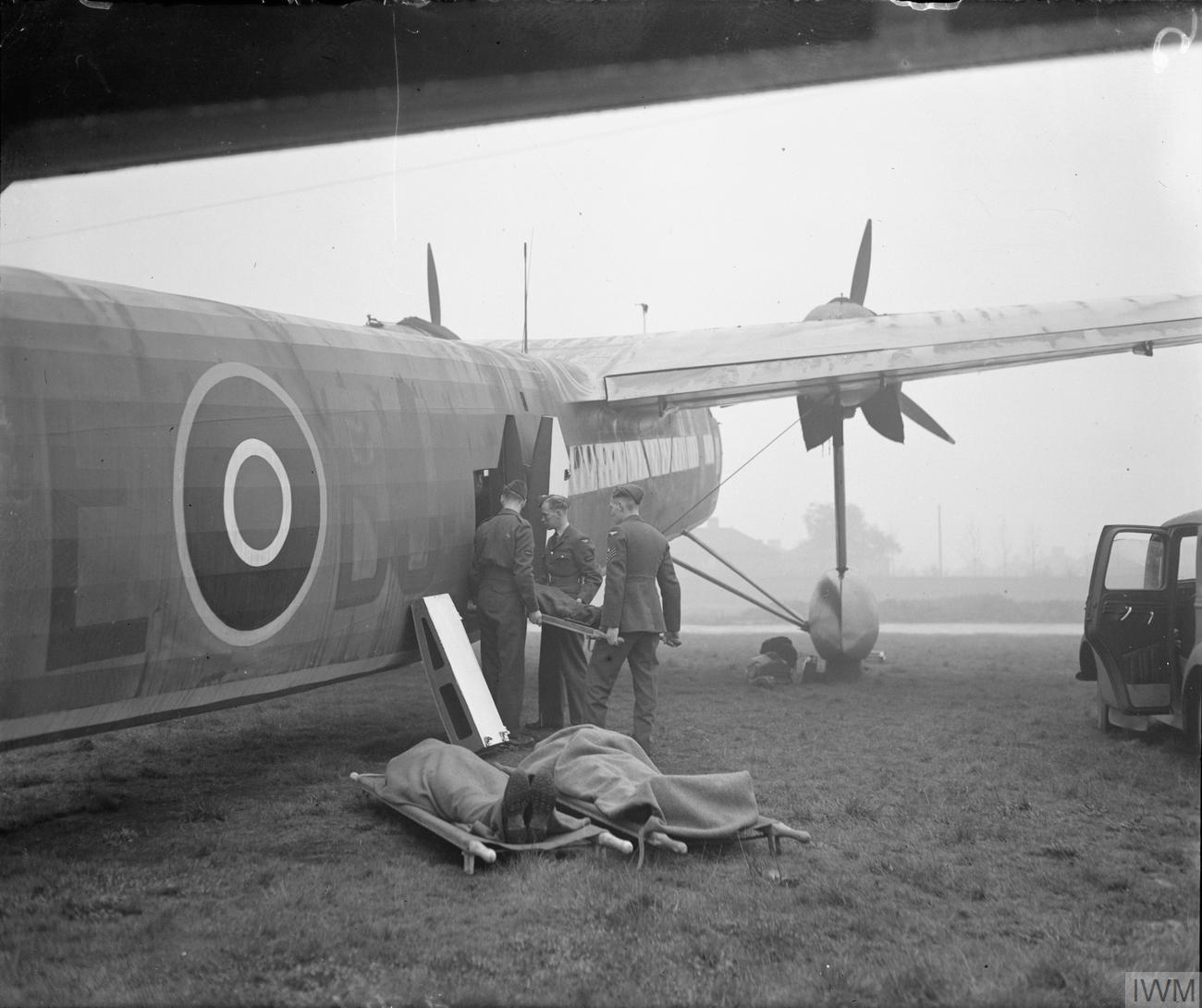
Medical orderlies loading stretcher cases into a Harrow air ambulance of No. 271 Squadron at RAF Hendon, Middlesex, circa 1943

Canada

- Royal Canadian Air Force

United Kingdom

- Royal Air Force
  - No. 37 Squadron – 1937–1939 at RAF Feltwell
  - No. 75 Squadron – 1937–1939 at RAF Driffield and later RAF Honington
  - No. 93 Squadron – 1940–1941 at RAF Middle Wallop (aerial mine role)
  - No. 115 Squadron – 1937–1939 at RAF Marham
  - No. 214 Squadron – 1937–1939 at RAF Scampton later RAF Feltwell
  - No. 215 Squadron – 1937–1939 at RAF Driffield and later RAF Honington
  - No. 271 Squadron – 1940–1945 at RAF Doncaster later RAF Down Ampney (transport role)
  - No. 420 Flight – became 93 Squadron
  - No. 1680 Flight – became 271 Squadron
- Fleet Air Arm
  - 782 Naval Air Squadron
- Flight Refuelling Limited

== Specifications (Harrow II) ==
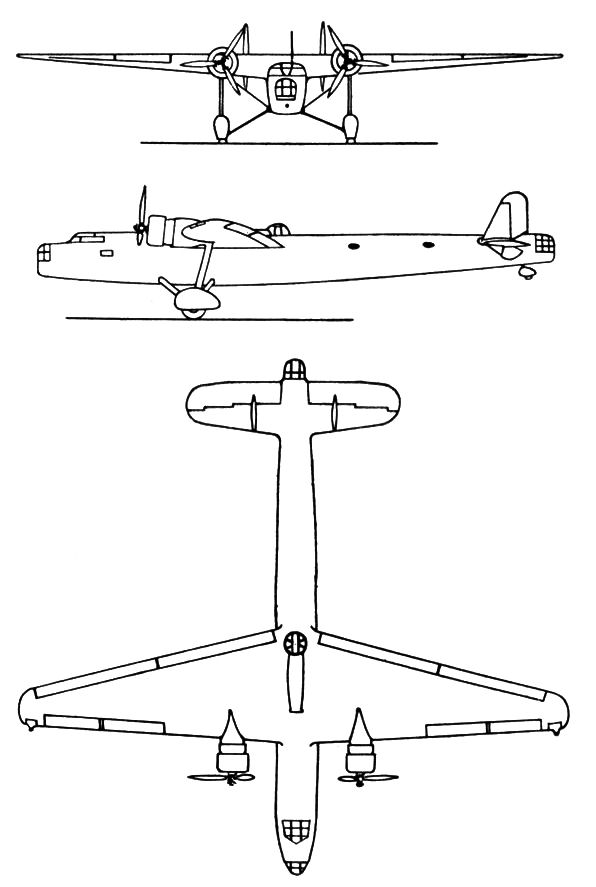
Handley Page Harrow 3-view drawing from L'Aerophile August 1937

Data from The British Bomber since 1914

General characteristics

- Crew: 5
- Capacity: 20 fully equipped soldiers or 12 stretcher cases (used as transport)
- Length: 82 ft 2 in (25.04 m)
- Wingspan: 88 ft 5 in (26.95 m)
- Height: 19 ft 5 in (5.92 m)
- Wing area: 1,090 sq ft (101 m^{2})
- Empty weight: 13,600 lb (6,169 kg)
- Gross weight: 23,000 lb (10,433 kg)
- Powerplant: 2 × Bristol Pegasus XX nine-cylinder air-cooled radial piston engines, 925 hp (690 kW) each for take-off
- Propellers: 3-bladed variable-pitch propellers

Performance

- Maximum speed: 200 mph (320 km/h, 170 kn)
- Cruise speed: 163 mph (262 km/h, 142 kn)
- Range: 1,260 mi (2,030 km, 1,090 nmi)
- Service ceiling: 22,800 ft (6,900 m)
- Rate of climb: 710 ft/min (3.6 m/s)
- Wing loading: 21.1 lb/sq ft (103 kg/m^{2})
- Power/mass: 0.0804 hp/lb (0.1322 kW/kg)

Armament

- Guns: 4 × 0.303 in (7.7 mm) Lewis Guns
- Bombs: Up to 3,000 lb (1,400 kg) of bombs internally.

== See also ==
- Havoc Mk I (Pandora) intruder – also used for Long Aerial Mine (LAM) operations

Aircraft of comparable role, configuration, and era

- Armstrong Whitworth Whitley
- Bristol Bombay
- Dornier Do 23
- Junkers Ju 52

Related lists

- List of aircraft of World War II
- List of aircraft of the Royal Air Force
