= Handley Page H.P.51 =

H.P.51

General information
- Type: Bomber-transport
- National origin: United Kingdom
- Manufacturer: Handley Page
- Designer: G.V. Lachmann
- Number built: 1

History
- First flight: 8 May 1935
- Developed from: Handley Page H.P.43
- Variant: Handley Page H.P.54 Harrow

The Handley Page H.P.51 was a monoplane conversion of the earlier, unsuccessful biplane bomber-transport aircraft, the Handley Page H.P.43. The Air Ministry ordered the production variant off the drawing board as the Handley Page H.P.54 Harrow bomber.

== Development ==
When Air Ministry specification C.16/28 for a multi-engined bomber transport failed to produce a satisfactory replacement for the Vickers Victoria, the Ministry turned to monoplane designs. Specification C.26/31 called for a twin-engined monoplane capable of carrying 24 soldiers and their gear over a range of 920 ml (1,480 km) at a speed of more than 95 mph (153 km/h). Handley Page, having had useful experience of constructing single-spar monoplane wings for their unsuccessful H.P.47 general-purpose bomber, realised that they could marry the fuselage of their failed contender for C.16/28, the H.P.43, to a monoplane wing. The result was designated the H.P.51.

It was a high-wing cantilever monoplane with the wing meeting the fuselage at the same position as the lower wing of the H.P.43 but without the inboard anhedral. The wing had a similar tapered planform to that of the H.P.47, though much bigger with a span of 90 ft rather than 58 ft. The H.P.47's wing construction used a single central spar forming the rear of a stressed skin torsion box forward to the leading edge and the confirmation of its design assumptions by stress tests at the RAE allowed a similar approach for the new aircraft. The H.P.51 wings were of thick RAF 34 section, and like the H.P.47 were fabric-covered behind the spar. There were leading edge slats on the outer half of the wing with fabric-covered ailerons and inboard slotted flaps on the trailing edge. The undercarriage legs of the H.P.51 were longer than those of the H.P.43 because there was no anhedral wing section: the main legs went vertically to the spar just behind the engine mounting and were each braced to the fuselage with a pair of struts from top and bottom of the leg. The resulting landing gear had a wide track, with legs in streamlined fairings and the wheels in spats.

The fabric-covered, tube framed fuselage was that of the H.P.43, though extended by 31 inches (787 mm) to provide the larger tail moment required by the monoplane's broader chord wings. The original tail was also used, though the area of all the flying surfaces was increased by extending both leading and trailing edges, the monoplane carrying noticeably more fin below the tailplane than its predecessor. The H.P.51 was powered by two 750 hp (560 kW) Armstrong Siddeley Tiger IV 14-cylinder double-row radial engines mounted on the chord line and in broad-chord Townend cowlings.

The aircraft was completed at Cricklewood, dismantled and taken to the newer Handley Page site at Radlett for its first flight on 8 May 1935, piloted by Major J.L.B.H. Cordes. The results were so encouraging that Handley Page decided to press ahead with a production-ready variant designated the H.P.54 (later known as the Harrow) and submit this to C.16/31 rather than the H.P.51. In the end, Handley Page did not enter the C.28/31 competition at all and the Harrow was ordered on an ad hoc specification (B.29/35, issued June 1935) to go to production from the drawing board. In January 1935 the final report on wind tunnel tests on a 1/32 model confirmed what had been suspected from preliminary data, that with flaps down the elevator was partly blanketed, requiring the design of a revised tail for the Harrow. To test the redesign, the H.P.51's empennage was modified to the new profile, increasing the area by 70% and requiring external bracing. The new fins were taller and more rounded and the elevator had a much smoother contour. Apart from the bracing and the detail of the fin below the tailplane, the tail was now that of the Harrow. Although tests of the new surfaces were supposed to be urgent, it was decided to fit the H.P.51 with 690 hp (515 kW) Bristol Pegasus III engines similar to the Mk Xs intended for the Harrow. These alterations delayed the flight of the revised aircraft until early September 1936 and it did not fly with the new tail until later. It may even have first flown with the new tail after the first flight of the Harrow on 10 October 1936.

== Operational history ==
The sole H.P.51 flew in its revised form for a short while with Handley Page. In January 1937 it went on to RAF Martlesham Heath for performance testing, then joined the RAE which it served until early 1940. During that period it was involved with air-to-air refuelling, blind flying instrumentation and intercom and radio developments.

Some cockpit components of the aircraft survive, the rudder pedals, the base of the throttle quadrant and other parts. They are part of the collection of the Royal Air Force Museum.

== Specifications ==
Data from Barnes & James 1987, pp. 351

General characteristics

- Crew: five
- Length: 78 ft 4 in (23.9 m)
- Wingspan: 90 ft 0 in (27.45 m)
- Wing area: 1,170 sq ft (157.9 m^{2})
- Empty weight: 12,000 lb (5,445 kg)
- Gross weight: 18,000 lb (8,160 kg)
- Powerplant: 2 × Bristol Pegasus III 9-cylinder single row radial , 690 hp (515 kW) each

Performance

- Maximum speed: 108 mph (302 km/h, 94 kn)
- Range: 950 mi (1,530 km, 830 nmi)
