= Arthur Keen (RAF officer) =

British World War I flying ace

Arthur Willan Keen
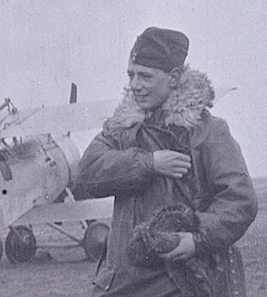
- Captain Keen at Bruay with 40 Squadron some time between April and November 1917
- Born: 20 March 1895; Edgbaston, Warwickshire, England
- Died: 2 September 1918 (aged 23); Wimereux, France
- Burial place: Terlincthun British Cemetery, Wimille, France; 50°44′41″N 1°36′37″E
- Military career
- Allegiance: United Kingdom
- Branch: British Army; Royal Air Force
- Service years: 1915–1918
- Rank: Major
- Units: Army Service Corps; No. 70 Squadron RFC; No. 40 Squadron RFC
- Commands: No. 40 Squadron RAF
- Conflicts: World War I; Western Front
- Awards: Military Cross; Bronze Medal of the Royal Humane Society

Major Arthur Willan Keen MC (20 March 1895 – 2 September 1918) was a British World War I flying ace credited with fourteen aerial victories. Keen won his first decoration before ever seeing combat when he saved a fellow pilot from drowning on 17 June 1916. Once in France, his combat record saw him promoted to flight, then squadron commands. The latter posting made him a major at age 23.

== Background and education ==
Keen was born in Edgbaston, Warwickshire, to Arthur Thomas Keen and Isabel Charlotte Eliza (née Willan). He was educated at Aldro, Dunchurch Hall and Rugby Schools before going up to Trinity College, Cambridge, in 1913 to study engineering.

== Military service ==
Keen left university after two years, abandoning his degree studies, in order to join the Army. He was commissioned as a temporary second lieutenant in the Army Service Corps on 24 May 1915.

In November 1915 he transferred to the Royal Flying Corps and attended the School of Instruction at Wantage Hall, Reading, Berkshire, before moving to Catterick, Yorkshire, for flying training. He was granted Royal Aero Club Aviator's Certificate No. 2298 on 17 January 1916, flying a Maurice Farman biplane. On 15 February he was appointed a flying officer and transferred to the General List, and was promoted to lieutenant on 1 June.

On 17 June Lieutenant Robert Edward Andrew MacBeth crashed into the sea off Montrose. Keen, who witnessed the crash from the air, promptly landed his aircraft nearby and swam out to help MacBeth to shore. He was subsequently awarded the Bronze Medal of the Royal Humane Society.

Keen was then posted to No. 70 Squadron RFC in France, flying the Sopwith 1½ Strutter. There he gained his first aerial victory by driving down a Fokker D.II out of control over Bapaume on 28 August 1916. He was appointed a flight commander with the temporary rank of captain on 22 October 1916. He returned to England to serve as a flying instructor between December 1916 and April 1917, before being posted to No. 40 Squadron RFC. On 1 May, flying a Nieuport 17, he destroyed an Albatros D.III near Douai, to score his second win. Between then and 15 August he scored ten more victories. His award of the Military Cross was gazetted the following day. Keen was then withdrawn from combat for a rest, serving as an instructor at the Central Flying School from 30 November 1917.

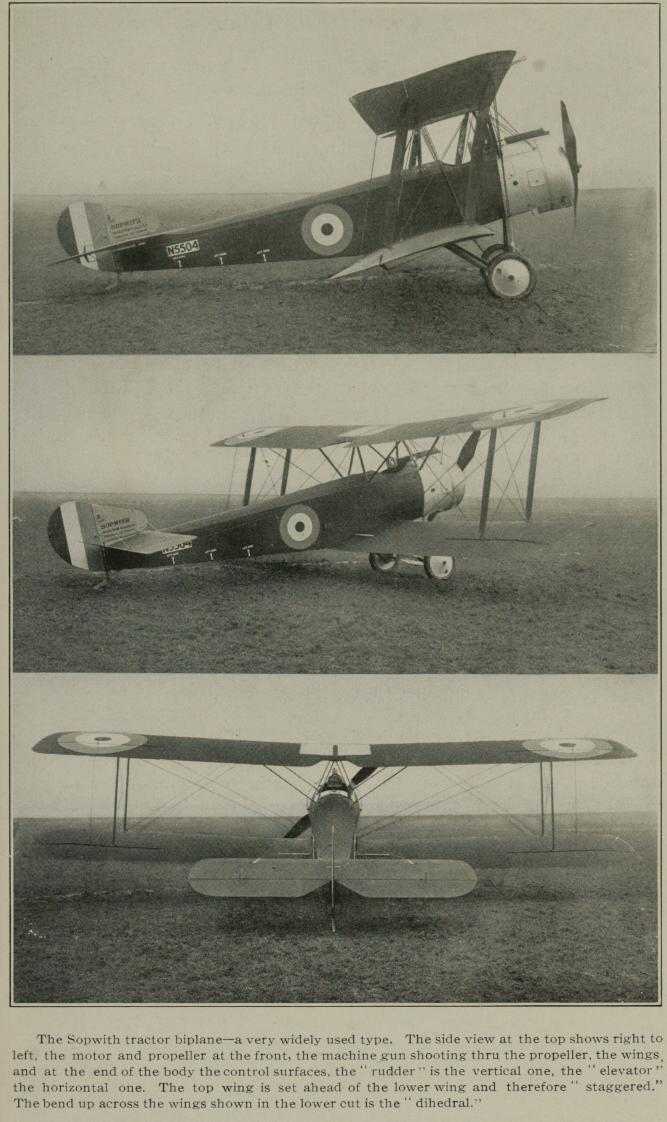
Sopwith 1 1/2 Strutter Biplane

On 1 April 1918 he was appointed an acting-major to command a flying training squadron, but soon returned to France to take command of No. 40 Squadron following the death of its commanding officer Roderic Dallas on 1 June. Flying a S.E.5a Keen scored two more victories during his command, on 30 June and 9 August, to bring his final tally to four German fighters set on fire; three others destroyed, one of which was shared; and seven enemy aircraft driven down out of control.

Keen was severely burned in a flying accident at around 21:30, 15 August at Bruay, 40 Squadron's home airfield at the time. He died of his wounds on 2 September 1918 in No. 5 British Red Cross (Lady Hadfield's) Hospital, Wimereux, France. He is interred in Plot III. A. 17, Terlincthun British Cemetery, Wimille, France.

== Honours and awards ==
Military Cross
Temporary Captain Arthur William (sic) Keen, General List and RFC.

"For conspicuous gallantry and devotion to duty. He has shown the greatest gallantry and skill in aerial fighting, and his daring in leading offensive patrols into favourable positions for attack has been the means of many hostile aircraft being destroyed and driven down."

== Bibliography ==
- Franks, Norman (2000). Nieuport Aces of World War I. London, UK: Osprey Publishing. ISBN 978-1-85532-961-4.
