= No. 215 Squadron RAF =

- Active: 1918–1919; 1935–1940; 1940–1946; 1947–1948; 1963–1967
- Country: United Kingdom
- Branch: Royal Air Force
- Motto(s): Surgite nox adest Latin: "Arise, night is at hand"
- Equipment: Vickers Wellington; Consolidated Liberator; Douglas Dakota

No. 215 Squadron RAF was a Royal Air Force aircraft squadron formed as a night bomber squadron in the First and Second World Wars, becoming a transport squadron near the end of the Second World War.

== History ==
First World War

No. 215 Squadron was formed in France on 1 April 1918 by renumbering No. 15 Squadron of the Royal Naval Air Service. No. 15 Squadron RNAS had been formed on 10 March 1918 to operate the Handley Page 0/100 as a night bomber squadron against targets in Germany. Soon after the squadron became part of the Royal Air Force it returned to England to re-equip with the Handley Page O/400 before returning to France as part of the Independent Air Force. After World War I hostilities ended (November 1918), the squadron disbanded on 18 October 1919.

1935

The squadron was re-formed and dissolved in late 1935. On 1 October, it was formed out of 'A' Flight, No. 58 Squadron at RAF Worthy Down, but was merged soon afterwards into 11 OTU. That same day, the squadron was officially re-formed at RAF Honington, as a Vickers Wellington unit, but the new squadron was again merged into 11 OTU.

Second World War

Following the outbreak of war with Japan, the squadron was re-formed as a bomber unit in December 1941, at RAF Newmarket. Equipped with Wellingtons, it was posted to Calcutta in 1942 and was involved in bombing operations. 215 Squadron was later re-equipped with Consolidated Liberator aircraft. During this period, it included a significant proportion of aircrews from other Commonwealth countries, many of whom were Royal Australian Air Force (RAAF) personnel. The squadron suffered significant losses of personnel and aircraft on operations over Burma.

In April 1945 it assumed a transport role and was re-equipped with Douglas Dakotas. While the squadron was officially disbanded on 15 February 1946, it was redesignated the same day as No. 48 Squadron.

1947–48

The squadron was formed again on 1 August 1947 at RAF Kabrit in Egypt with the Douglas Dakota for transport duties and was disbanded on 1 May 1948 when it was re-numbered as No. 70 Squadron.

1956–58

The squadron was reformed in April 1956 at RAF Dishforth to operate the Scottish Aviation Pioneer in the light transport role and Army support duties, and was disbanded two years later in September 1958 when it was re-designated No. 230 Squadron.

1963–67

The squadron was again formed in May 1963 at RAF Benson as a medium-range transport squadron for operation in the Far East and it moved to RAF Changi with the Armstrong Whitworth Argosy until it was disbanded in December 1967.

== Aircraft operated ==
Dates	Aircraft	Variant	Notes
1918	Handley Page O/100		Twin-engined biplane bomber
1918–1919	Handley Page O/400		Twin-engined biplane heavy bomber
1935–1937	Vickers Virginia	X	Twin-engined biplane heavy bomber
1937; 1940	Avro Anson	I	
1937–1939	Handley Page Harrow		Twin-engined heavy bomber
1939–1940	Vickers Wellington	I and IA	Twin-engined medium bomber
1942–1943; 1943–1944	Vickers Wellington	IC; X	
1944–1945	Consolidated Liberator	VI	Four-engined heavy bomber
1945–1946; 1947–1948	Douglas Dakota		Twin-engined transport
1956–1958	Scottish Aviation Pioneer	CC1	Twin-engined light transport
1963–1967	Armstrong Whitworth Argosy	C1	Four-engined medium transport
