= Golders Green Estate =

Housing development in London

Coordinates: 51.566°N 0.212°W

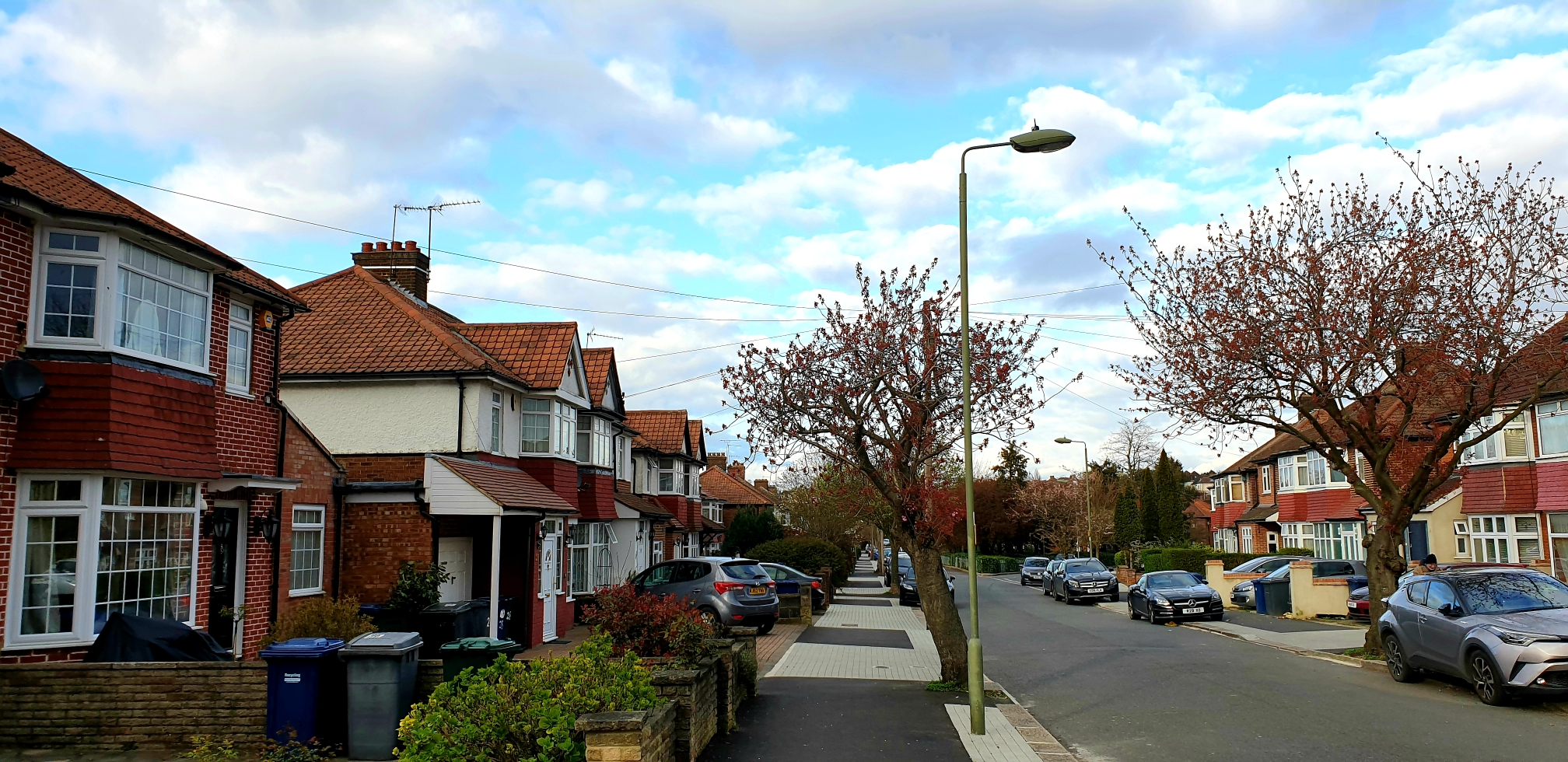
Cotswold Gardens, looking East

The Golders Green Estate is a private housing development in the London Borough of Barnet situated within the London NW2 postcode area.

It is bounded by (and includes) Cotswold Gardens and Cheviot Gardens and was built by John Laing & Co on the site of the Handley Page factory and aerodrome (Cricklewood Aerodrome), which closed in 1929. It borders Clitterhouse Playing Fields.

The area is located within the Golders Green electoral ward of the Finchley and Golders Green parliamentary constituency, and within the Golders Green Metropolitan Police Service ward. Nearby stations include Brent Cross, Golders Green, and Cricklewood, and the district is served by numerous bus routes.

The area was the childhood home of Jean Simmons, the actress.
