= 1920 Golders Green Handley Page O/400 crash =

First fatal UK airliner crash

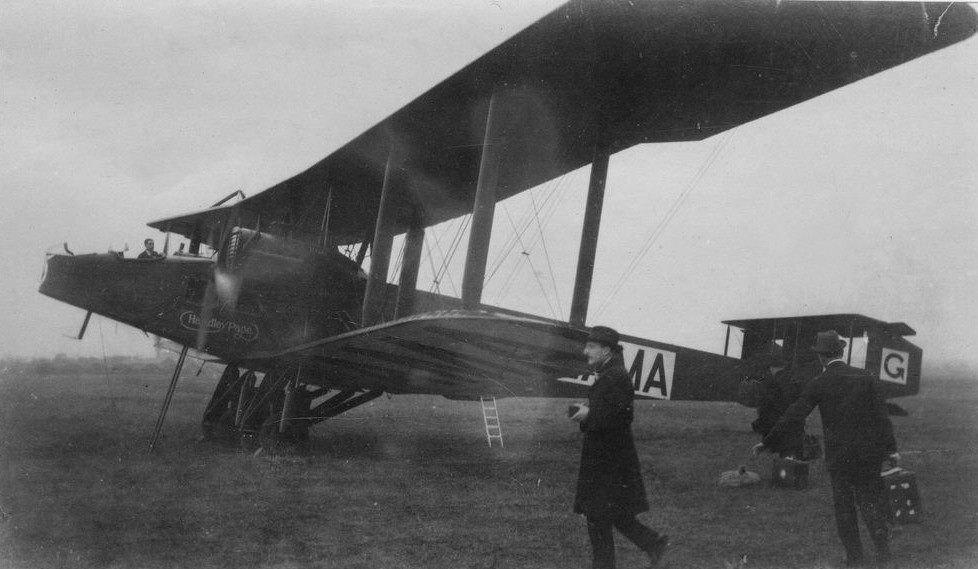
- G-EAMA, the O/400 involved in the accident.

Accident
- Date: 14 December 1920
- Summary: Controlled flight into terrain for unknown reasons
- Site: Golders Green, London; 51°34′13.5″N 0°12′11.07″W

Aircraft
- Aircraft type: Handley Page O/400
- Operator: Handley Page Transport
- Registration: G-EAMA
- Flight origin: Cricklewood Aerodrome, London, England
- Destination: Le Bourget Airport, Paris, France
- Occupants: 8
- Passengers: 6
- Crew: 2
- Fatalities: 4
- Survivors: 4

The 1920 Handley Page O/400 crash occurred on 14 December 1920 when a Handley Page Transport Handley Page O/400 on a scheduled passenger flight from London to Paris with two crew and six passengers crashed at Golders Green in North London after take-off from Cricklewood Aerodrome. The crew of two and two passengers were killed in the first fatal accident for the airline since the service had started in December 1919. It was reported as the first recorded airliner crash in history, but a larger airliner had crashed the previous year.

== Aircraft ==
The aircraft involved was a Handley Page O/400 registered G-EAMA, a large seven-passenger twin-engined biplane airliner. It had been built by the Birmingham Carriage Company and delivered to the Royal Air Force as a bomber during the First World War. As war surplus, it was converted into a passenger configuration in 1919 by Handley Page and used by Handley Page Transport for passenger services.

== Accident ==
The aircraft departed from Cricklewood Aerodrome around mid-day with six passengers, mail and freight for Paris. The weather was misty and the aircraft was seen flying low and crashing into a tree, falling into a back garden of a house in Golders Green (No. 6 Basing Hill) close to the airfield. Four passengers jumped or were thrown clear before the aircraft burst into flames. Two were unhurt and the other two only slightly injured. The two crew and two remaining passengers were killed in the fire. Locals rushed to help but due to the intense heat, the rescue efforts were futile. The Hendon Fire Brigade extinguished the fire and removed the bodies; the aircraft was destroyed and the newly built house was badly damaged.

== Passengers ==
Four passengers were killed in the crash, that being pilot Robert Bager, plane mechanic John Williams, Sam Salinger, and Van der Eist. The four passengers who managed to escape were named as E. Rosenthal, Alexander Bona, P. Curioni, and E. Studd.

== Inquest ==
An inquest to the four deaths was held at Hendon on 16 December 1920. One of the survivors explained the events to the inquest, although he saw the engines being tested before the flight he did not hear any problems with them but the aircraft was not able to climb above 100 feet and suddenly struck a tree. After the aircraft had crashed he immediately climbed over the debris and escaped through a window. Other evidence came from another passenger, the dispatcher and one of the first to arrive on the scene, a ground engineer and the pilot who had flown the aircraft the previous day; all were questioned but the cause of the aircraft hitting a tree under 50 feet (15 m) high was not determined. The coroner recorded a verdict that "the deceased died from consequence of burns due to the crashing of the aeroplane to the ground after striking a tree"; the coroner also said he did not have enough evidence to determine a cause.
