= Handley Page Transport =

Airline of the United Kingdom (1919–1924)

- Founded: 1919
- Commenced operations: 1 May 1919
- Ceased operations: 31 March 1924 (merged with British Marine Air Navigation Co Ltd, Daimler Airway and Instone Air Line to form Imperial Airways)
- Operating bases: Hounslow Heath Aerodrome; Cricklewood Aerodrome
- Fleet size: Handley Page Type O/400; Handley Page Type W.8
- Destinations: Paris; Brussels
- Key people: Frederick Handley Page

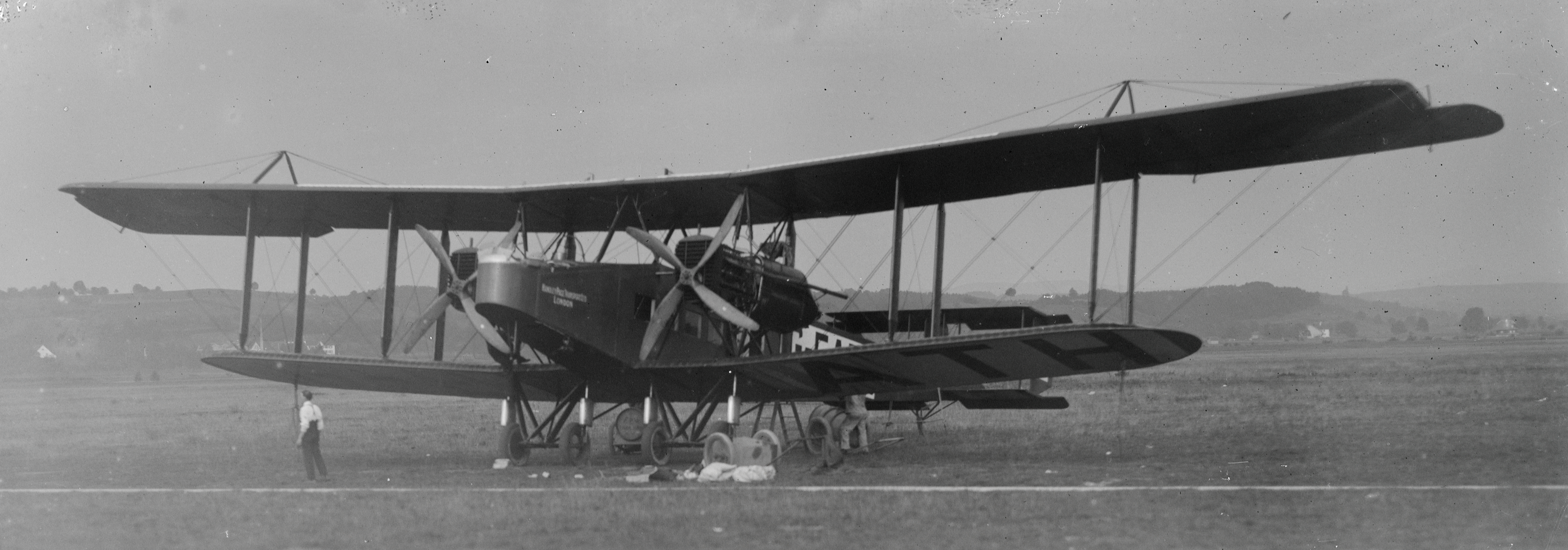
Handley Page Type O/400

Handley Page Transport Ltd was an airline company founded in 1919, soon after the end of the First World War, by Frederick Handley Page.

The company's first planes were Handley Page Type O/400 bombers modified for passenger use. They flew a London-Paris route. Per a request from the Air Ministry, the Handley Page Type W8 was later used for flights to both Paris and Brussels.

The world's first in-flight meal was offered by Handley Page Transport.

On 31 March 1924 the assets and operations of Handley were merged with three other British airlines to found Imperial Airways. That company remained dormant until reconstituted to take over operations for Miles Aircraft in 1947 as Handley Page (Reading) Ltd.

== Cricklewood Aerodrome ==
Cricklewood Aerodrome was adjacent to the Handley Page factory in Cricklewood, which had been established in 1912. The airfield was used by the factory and the transport company.

Until 17 February 1920 Handley Page Transport used Hounslow Heath Aerodrome to embark and disembark passengers for customs clearance, as customs facilities were not provided at Cricklewood initially. A London-Paris air service from Cricklewood Aerodrome was inaugurated in 1920.

The aerodrome closed in 1929 due to suburban development, and the Golders Green Estate was built on the site. A new aerodrome was built at Radlett, where most aircraft were then constructed. At Cricklewood construction of aircraft continued until 1964, when the premises were sold to become the Cricklewood trading estate.

== Accidents and incidents ==
- On 23 February 1920, a Handley Page O/7 (G-EANV) was destroyed in Acadia Siding, Cape Province, in a forced landing after the rudder came loose. All 10 occupants survived.
- On 25 February 1920, a Handley Page O/400 (G-EAMC) crashed 10 km (6.3 miles) N of El Shereik, Sudan, on a flight from Aswan to Khartoum. All 4 occupants were thrown clear on impact and survived. The plane was on a first attempted flight from London to Cape Town.
- On 30 June 1920, a Handley Page O/400 (G-EAKE) crashed in Östanå, Sweden, during a demonstrative competition to land an airmail contract. Both occupants survived.
- On 14 December 1920 a Handley Page O/400 used by the airline crashed on take-off from Cricklewood Aerodrome, hitting a tree; both crew and two of the six passengers died.
- On 30 December 1921, a Handley Page O/10 (G-EATM) crashed in Berck-sur-Mer, France. No details are available.
- On 14 January 1922, the Handley Page Transport Handley Page O/10 G-EATN, operating on a scheduled passenger flight from Croydon Airport in London to Paris–Le Bourget Airport outside Paris in Senlis, crashed while on approach to Le Bourget; all four people on board survived.
- On 10 July 1923, a Handley Page W.8 (G-EAPJ) made a forced landing in Poix, France, due to engine trouble on a Paris-London and was destroyed. All 9 occupants survived; the pilot and mechanic had minor injuries.

== See also ==
- List of defunct airlines of the United Kingdom
