= Handley Page Type O =

British heavy bomber aircraft in service 1916-1922

Type O
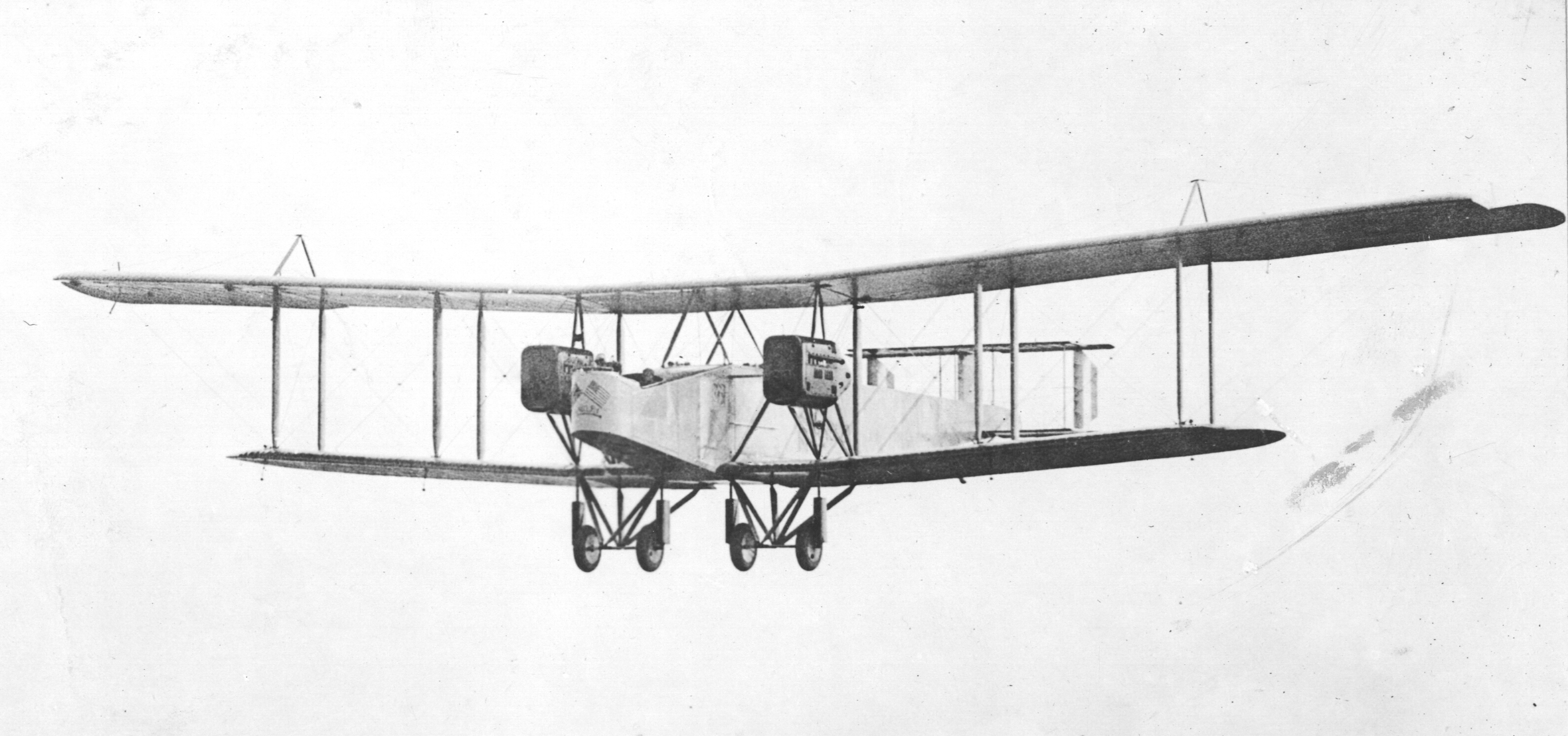

General information
- Type: Heavy bomber
- Manufacturer: Handley Page Aircraft Company
- Primary users: Royal Air Force Royal Naval Air Service
- Number built: 600

History
- Manufactured: 1915-1919
- Introduction date: 1916
- First flight: 17, December, 1915
- Retired: 1922
- Developed into: Handley Page Type W

The Handley Page Type O was a biplane bomber used by Britain during the First World War. When built, the Type O was one of the largest aircraft in the world. There were two main variants, the Handley Page O/100 (H.P.11) and the Handley Page O/400 (H.P.12).

The aircraft were used in France for tactical night attacks on targets in German-occupied France and Belgium and for strategic bombing of industrial and transport targets in the Rhineland. Some aircraft were temporarily diverted to anti-submarine reconnaissance and bombing in the Tees estuary in 1917 and two aircraft operated in the eastern Mediterranean. The Type O made such an impression that for many years after the war any large aircraft in Britain was referred to as a "Handley Page", even getting a dictionary entry.

== Design ==
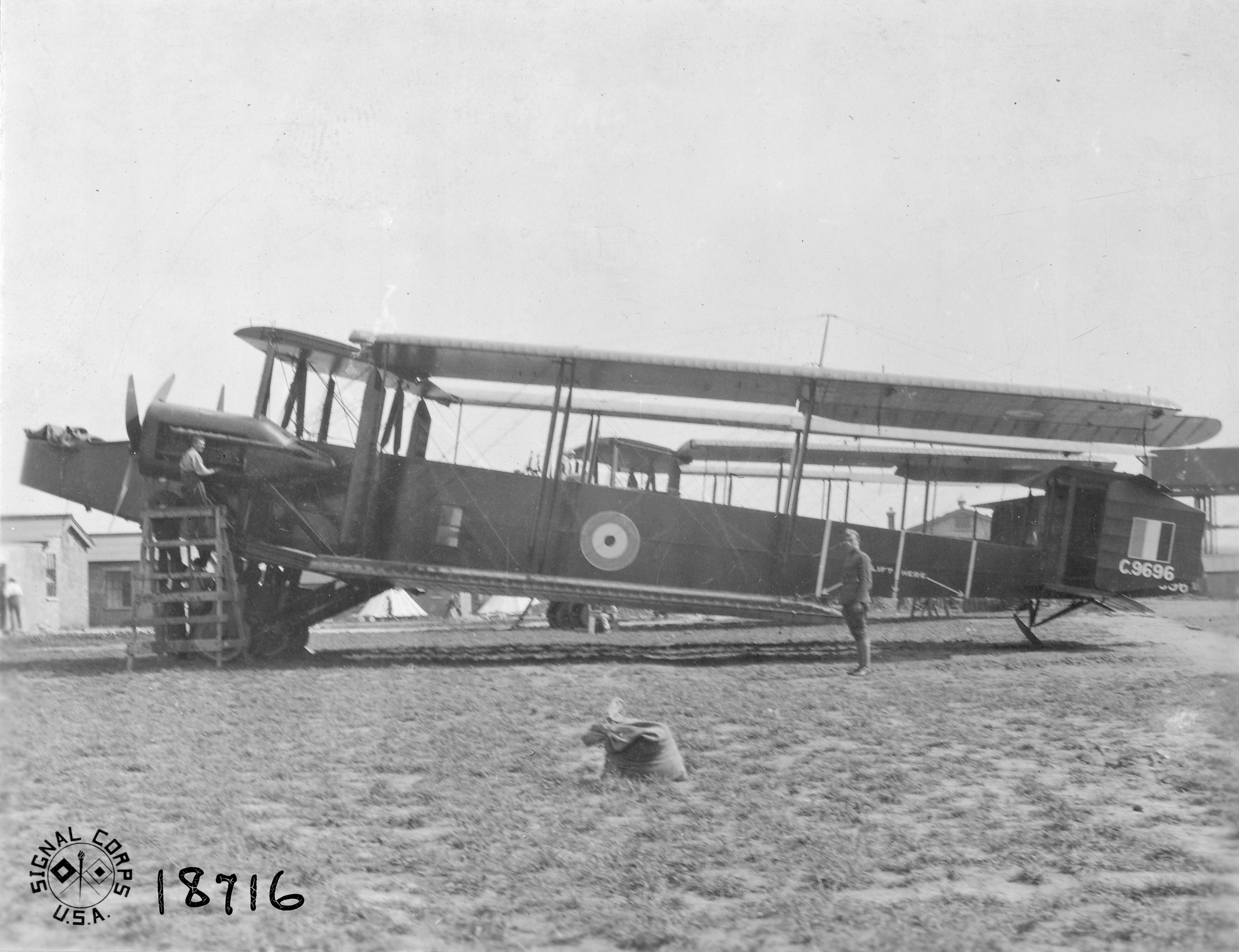
HP O/400 with wings folded

Design work began shortly after the start of the First World War following meetings between Captain Murray Sueter, the director of the Air Department of the Royal Navy, and Frederick Handley Page. Sueter requested "a bloody paralyser of an aircraft" for long-range bombing. The phrase was originated by Commander Charles Rumney Samson, who had recently returned from the front. Coastal patrol adaptations of the abortive Handley Page L/200, M/200 and MS/200 designs were initially discussed but Sueter's technical advisor favoured a large seaplane for coastal patrol and dockyard defence that would also be capable of bombing the German High Seas Fleet at its base in Kiel. The AD Seaplane Type 1000 prototype had already been commissioned from J. Samuel White & Co. of Cowes.

Handley Page suggested a land-based aircraft of similar size, and a specification drawn up around his suggestions was formally issued on 28 December 1914 for four prototypes. It called for a large biplane powered by two 150 hp (110 kW) Sunbeam engines, which was required to fit in a 75 ft × 75 ft (23 m × 23 m) hangar and would therefore have folding wings. It was to carry six 100 lb (45 kg) bombs and have armour to protect crew and engines. The crew of two were to be enclosed in a glazed cockpit and the only defensive armament planned was a rifle for the observer/engineer. The designation O/100 came from Handley Page's sequence of using letters for each of their designs, with 100 for the proposed wingspan of the aircraft. The design was approved on 4 February 1915, with 250 hp (190 kW) Rolls-Royce Eagle engines and on 9 February the contract was amended to include eight additional aircraft.

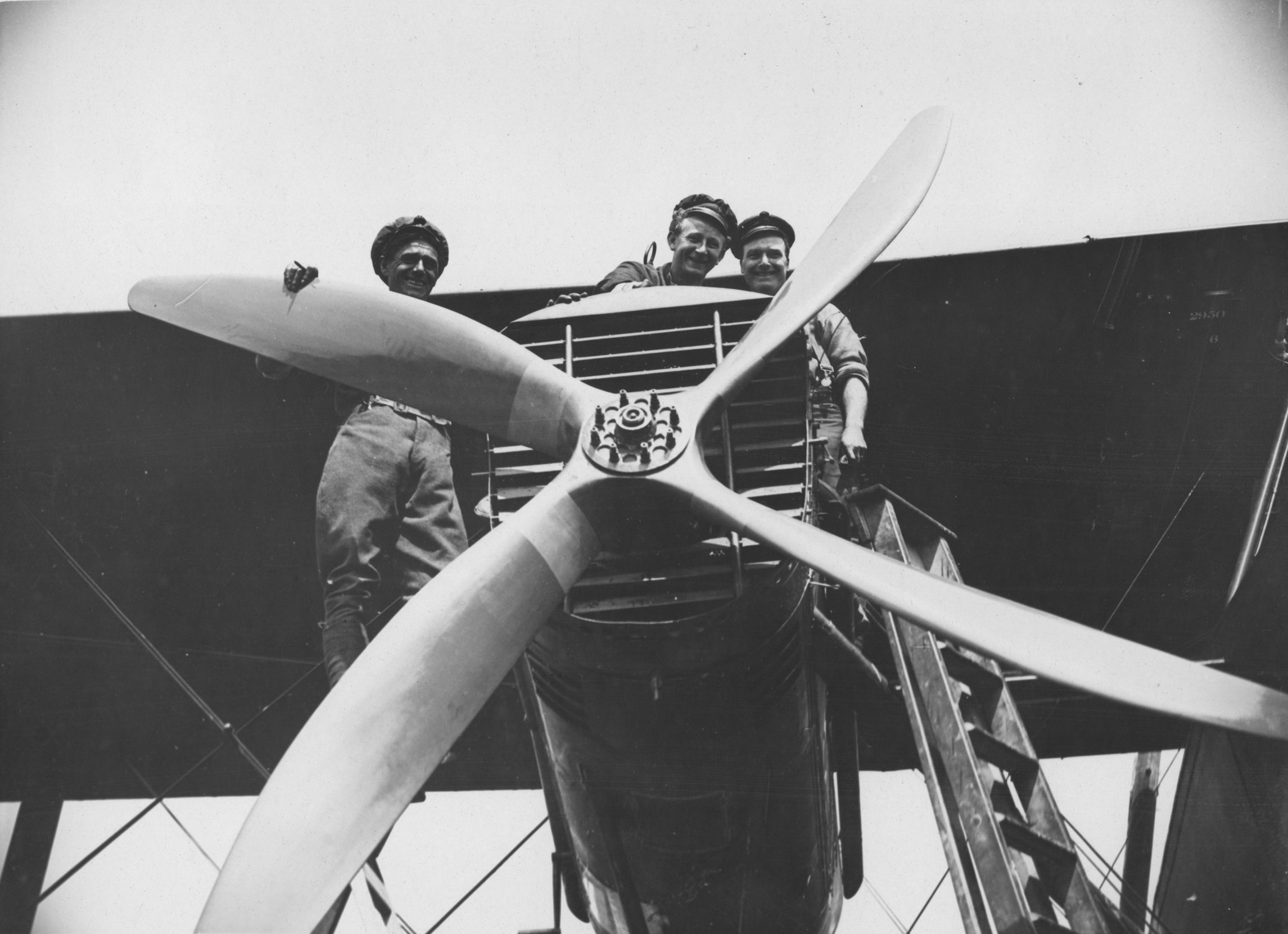
One of the engines with a four-bladed propeller.

The O/100 was an unequal-span three-bay biplane, with the overhanging part of the upper wing braced by kingposts, a rectangular section fuselage and a biplane tail with twin balanced rudders, between the horizontal surfaces. Balanced ailerons were fitted to the upper wing only and extended beyond the wing trailing edge and wing tips. The engines drove four-bladed propellers, rotating in opposite directions to cancel the torque, and were enclosed in armoured nacelles mounted between the wings on tubular steel struts. The nacelles had a long tapered fairing to reduce drag. To clear the wing rigging wires when the wings were folded, the rear portions of the fairings were hinged to fold inward. The structure of the fuselage and flying surfaces was primarily spruce, with the spars routed into I-beams to reduce weight.

== Development ==
The four prototypes and first production batch of six aircraft were built at Cricklewood, with the first aircraft delivered by road to Hendon on 9 December 1915. The first flight of the prototype, was made at Hendon on 17 December, when a short straight flight was made, the aircraft taking off without trouble at 50 mph (80 km/h). A second flight was made the following day, when it was found that the aircraft would not fly faster than about 55 mph (89 km/h). This was blamed on the drag caused by large honeycomb radiators, which were changed to tube radiators mounted on either side of the engine nacelles. A third flight on 31 December revealed a number of control problems, the ailerons and elevators were effective but heavy, partly due to excessive friction in the control circuit and the rudders were seriously overbalanced. After minor modifications, the aircraft was flown to RNAS Eastchurch, where full-speed trials were made. On reaching 70 mph (110 km/h), the tail unit began to vibrate and twist violently; the pilot immediately landed and an inspection showed severe damage to the rear fuselage structure. Reinforcement failed to cure the problem, meanwhile the enclosed cockpit and most of the armour plating were also removed. The second prototype was completed in April 1916 and had an open cockpit in a longer nose with room for a gunner. To save weight, most of the armour was deleted and was the arrangement for later production of the machine.

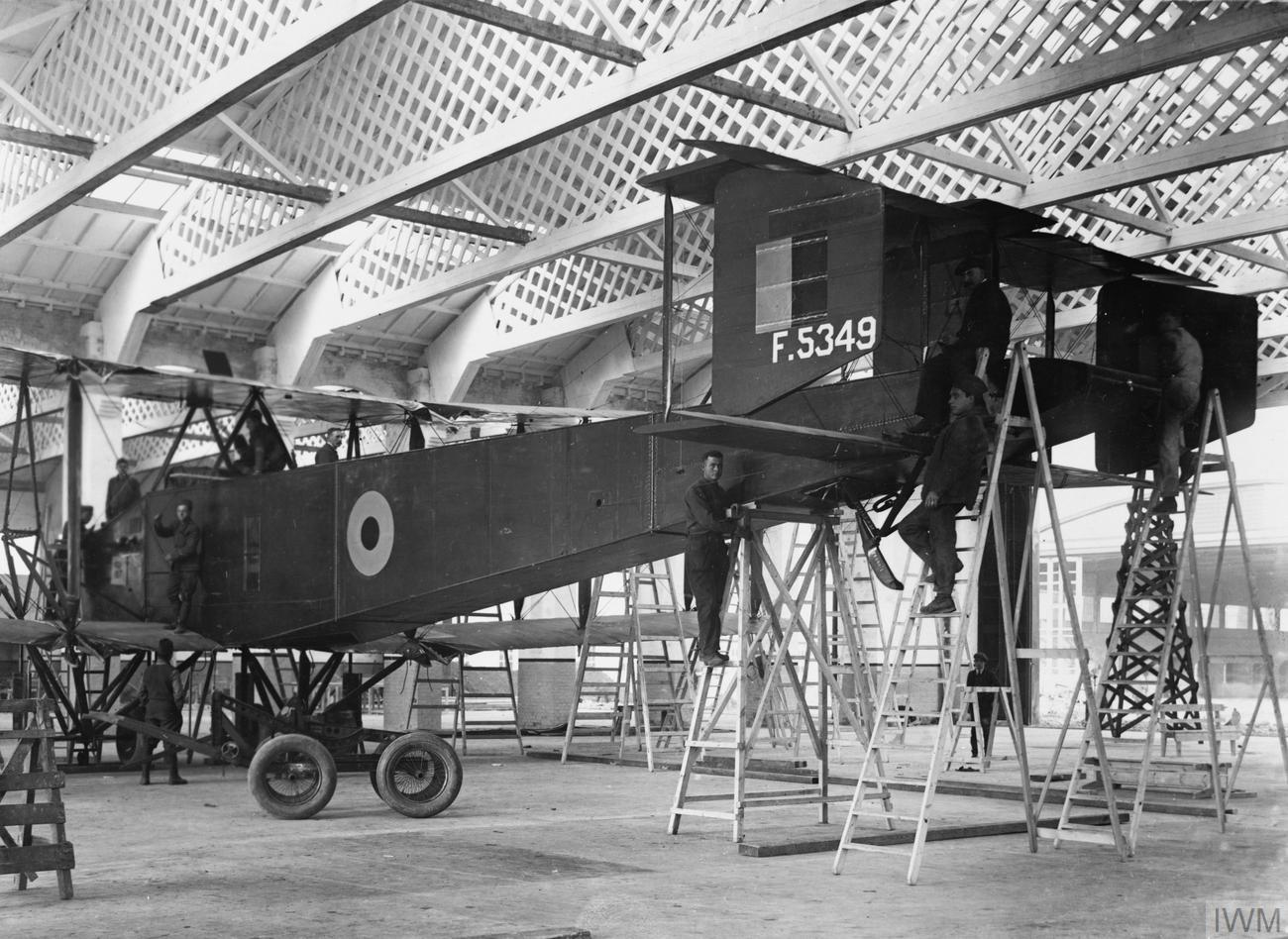
HP O/400 being built

After a series of proving flights at Hendon, 1456 was accepted by the RNAS and was flown to Manston for further trials. These revealed that despite a reduced balance area on the elevators, there was still a tail oscillation problem. A lack of directional stability caused by the increased forward side area was partly cured by adding a fixed fin but to find the cause of the tail oscillation, the Admiralty called in Frederick Lanchester from the National Physical Laboratory. Lanchester agreed that simple structural weakness was not the root of the problem and that resonance of the fuselage was the probable cause. Static tests on the third prototype which had a redesigned, stiffer, fuselage structure showed nothing. Lanchester flew as an observer in an amidships crew position on 26 June. The tail oscillations started at 80 mph (130 km/h) and Lanchester observed that the tail twisted by 15° to either side and that there was asymmetrical movement of the right and left halves of the elevators, which were connected by long control cables rather than being rigidly linked. He recommended that they be rigidly linked, that elevator balances be removed and additional bracing added between the lower longerons and the lower tailplane spar, measures which were successful in solving the problem.

The fourth prototype was completed with the same fuselage structure as the second prototype and had provision for armament, with a Scarff ring mounting in the nose, a pair of post mountings in the mid position and a gun mounting in the rear fuselage. This was also the first O/100 to be fitted with 320 hp (240 kW) Rolls-Royce Eagle engines. After completing acceptance trials, the second and third prototypes were retained at Manston to form a Handley Page training flight. The first prototype was rebuilt to production standard and the fourth prototype tested a new nacelle design, which was un-armoured, had an enlarged fuel tank and a shorter fairing obviating the need for the tail to fold. The new nacelle was used on all aircraft built after the initial batch of twelve. From 1461, an additional 130 imp gal (590 L; 160 US gal) fuel tank was fitted in the fuselage above the bomb floor. A total of 46 O/100s were built before being superseded by the Type O/400.

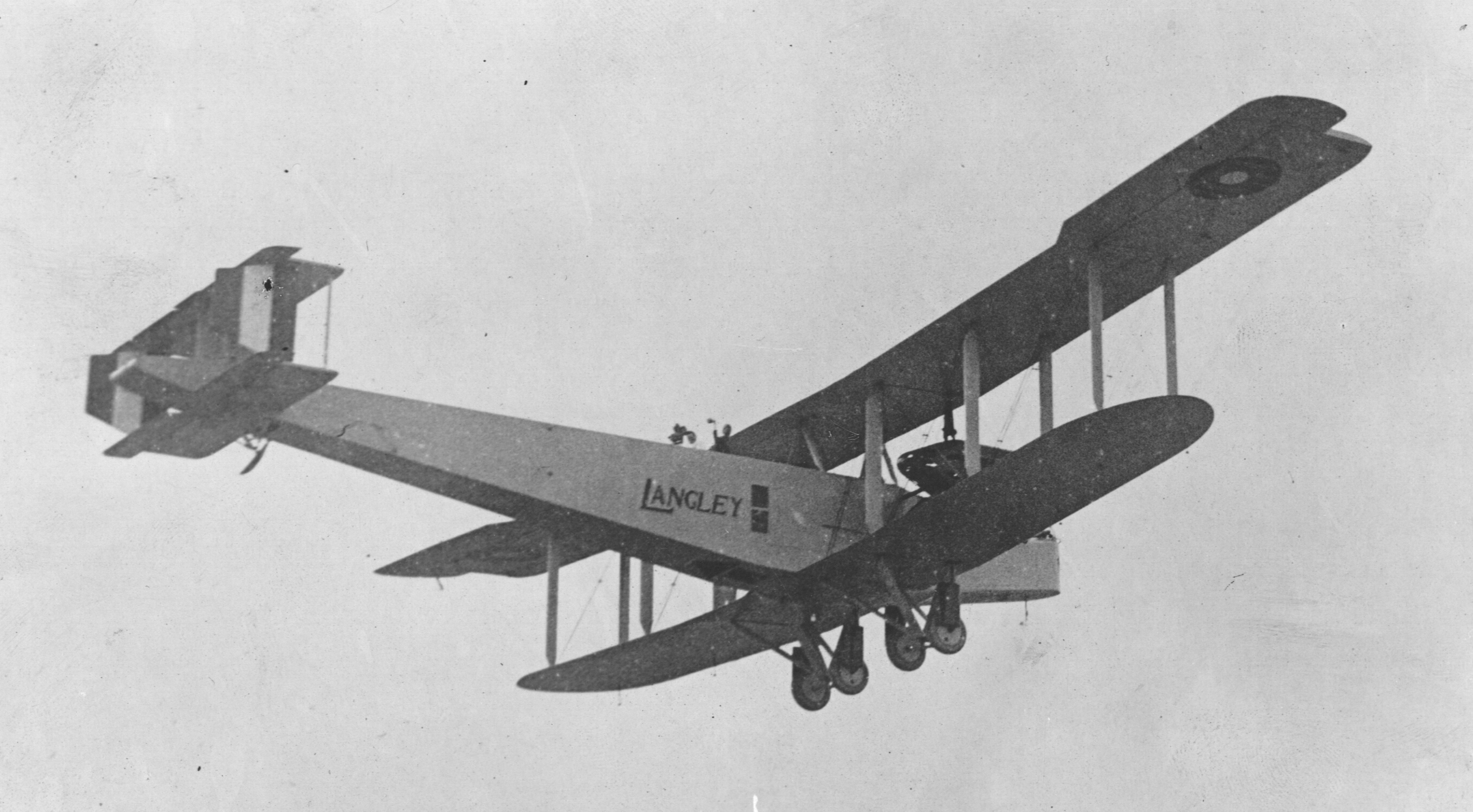
First US built Handley Page bomber, the Langley, in flight

The most significant difference between the two types was the use of 360 hp (270 kW) Eagle VIII engines. Unlike the earlier engines, this engine was not built in handed versions, because production of engines of both types for engine type approval had been difficult. Wind tunnel tests at the NPL established that the counter-rotating propellers caused directional instability with the O/100. Only one version was necessary, simplifying production and maintenance and the p-factor was overcome by slightly offsetting the fin. The O/400 had a strengthened fuselage, an increased bomb load, the nacelle tanks were removed and the fuel was carried in two 130 imp gal (590 L; 160 US gal) fuselage tanks, supplying a pair of 15 imp gal (68 L; 18 US gal) gravity tanks. The new nacelles were smaller and had simplified supporting struts; the reduction of drag improved maximum speed and ceiling. The revised nacelle was tested in 3188, which in 1917 was flown at Martlesham Heath with a variety of engine installations. An initial order for 100 of the revised design, with Sunbeam Maori or Eagle engines, was placed on 14 August but cancelled shortly afterwards. Twelve sets of Cricklewood-built components were transferred to the Royal Aircraft Factory, where they were assembled into the first production O/400s. More than 400 were supplied before the Armistice at a price of £6,000 each. Another 107 were licence-built in the US by the Standard Aircraft Corporation (out of 1,500 ordered by the air corps). Forty-six out of an order for fifty were built by Clayton & Shuttleworth in Lincoln.

== Operational history ==
=== Flanders ===
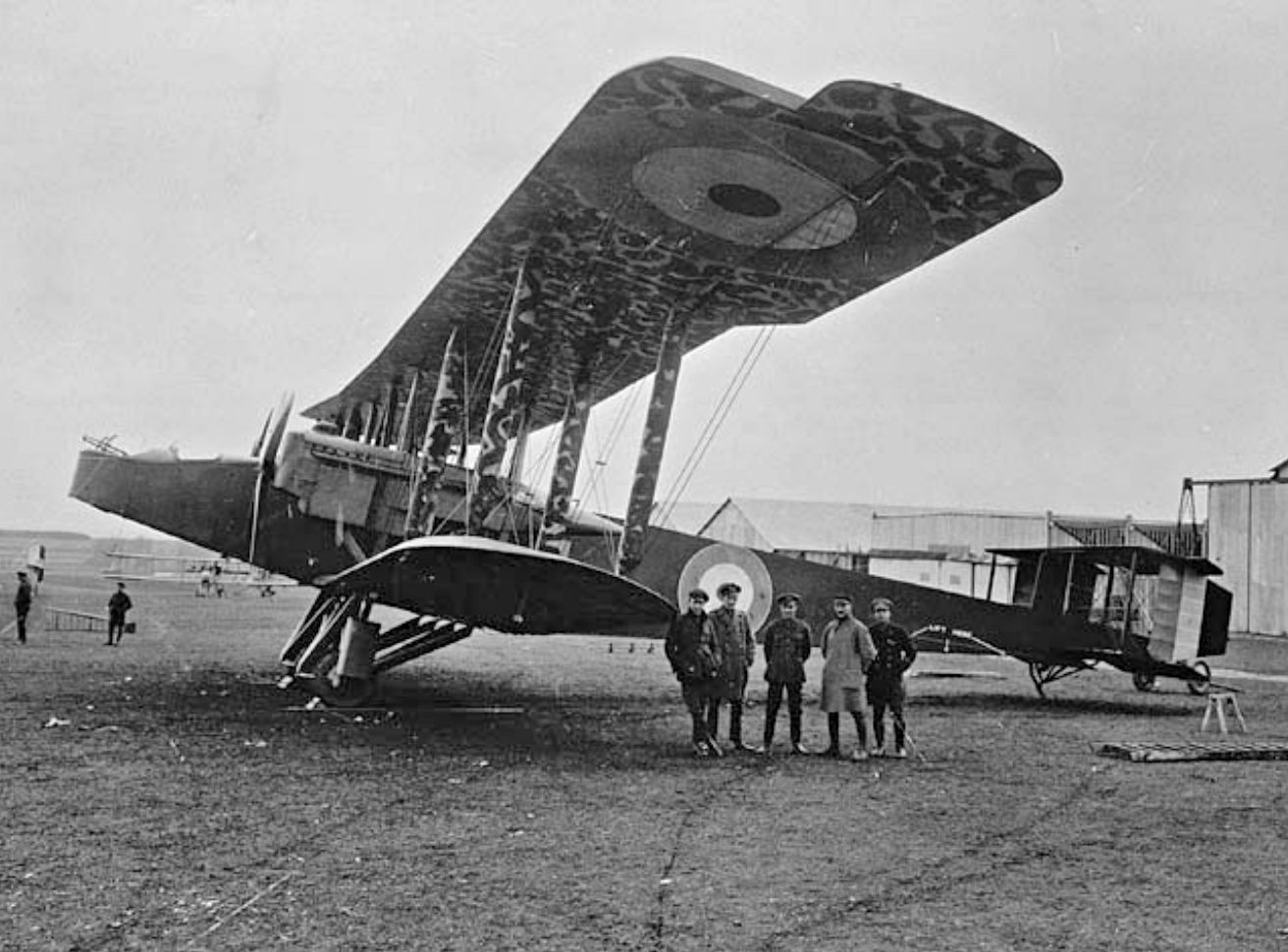
RNAS O/100 at Ochey airfield in 1917 with an experimental camouflage scheme.

The first twenty O/100s deployed to France were received by 7 Squadron and 7A Squadron of the 5th Wing RNAS at Dunkirk in late 1916. At first the O/100s were used for daylight attacks over the North Sea, damaging a German destroyer on 23 April 1917, but the loss of an aircraft to fighter attack two days later resulted in a switch to night operations, usually by single aircraft, against German-occupied Belgian ports, railway targets and airfields. On the night of 16/17 August 14 O/100s dropped 9 long tons (9.1 t) of bombs on Torhout railway station. O/100s from Coudekerque carried out anti-U-boat patrols off the mouth of the River Tees in September 1917. Eleven U-boats were sighted and seven attacked with bombs, but none was sunk, although U-boat operations were drastically reduced in the area.

=== Dardanelles ===
As part of the Dardanelles campaign, an O/100 was flown 2,000 mi (3,200 km) from England to Mudros on the Greek island of Lemnos in the eastern Mediterranean by Lieutenant Ross Smith. It made night attacks against Ottoman Empire force, and supplied the small number of aircraft supporting the Arab insurgency being directed by T. E. Lawrence.

On the night of 3/4 July 1917, the Handley Page was used for an attack on Galata air base but the engines overheated and the crew turned back, jettisoning some bombs and dropping the others on an army camp near Bulair. On 8/9 July 1917, an attempt to bomb Constantinople had to be abandoned after 3 1/2 hours of battling headwinds, instead targets of opportunity were bombed on the way back.

The next night, Constantinople was reached before midnight and they attacked the anchored battlecruiser SMS Goeben from 800 ft (240 m) with eight 112 lb (51 kg) bombs, and sank an Ottoman S138-class torpedo boat Yadigar-i Millet (Jadhigar-i-Millet). The crew then bombed the SS General, thought to be the German HQ, and dropped two bombs on the Ottoman War Office building before returning to Mudros at 3:40 a.m.

On 6 August the aircraft was used to bomb warehouses and ships in the harbour of Pandera on the south shore of the Marmara, and was then used on anti-submarine patrols until 2 September, when it was sent to bomb Adrianopolis. En route the crew dropped two bombs on a submarine as it dived, before dropping two more on Kuleli Burgas and then the rest on the Adrianopolis railway station buildings. On 30 September, (flown by John Alcock), it raided railway stations near Constantinople and Haidar Pasha but was forced to ditch in the Gulf of Xeros, after an engine failed. The crew floated with the aircraft for two hours and fired Very lights but were not seen by British destroyers. They then swam for an hour to reach the Gallipoli peninsula, where they were captured. Another Handley Page was flown from England to reinforce the Palestine Brigade and served with 1 Squadron, Australian Flying Corps. In September 1918, the bomber was used to supply Colonel T. E. Lawrence and the Arabs.

=== Independent Force ===
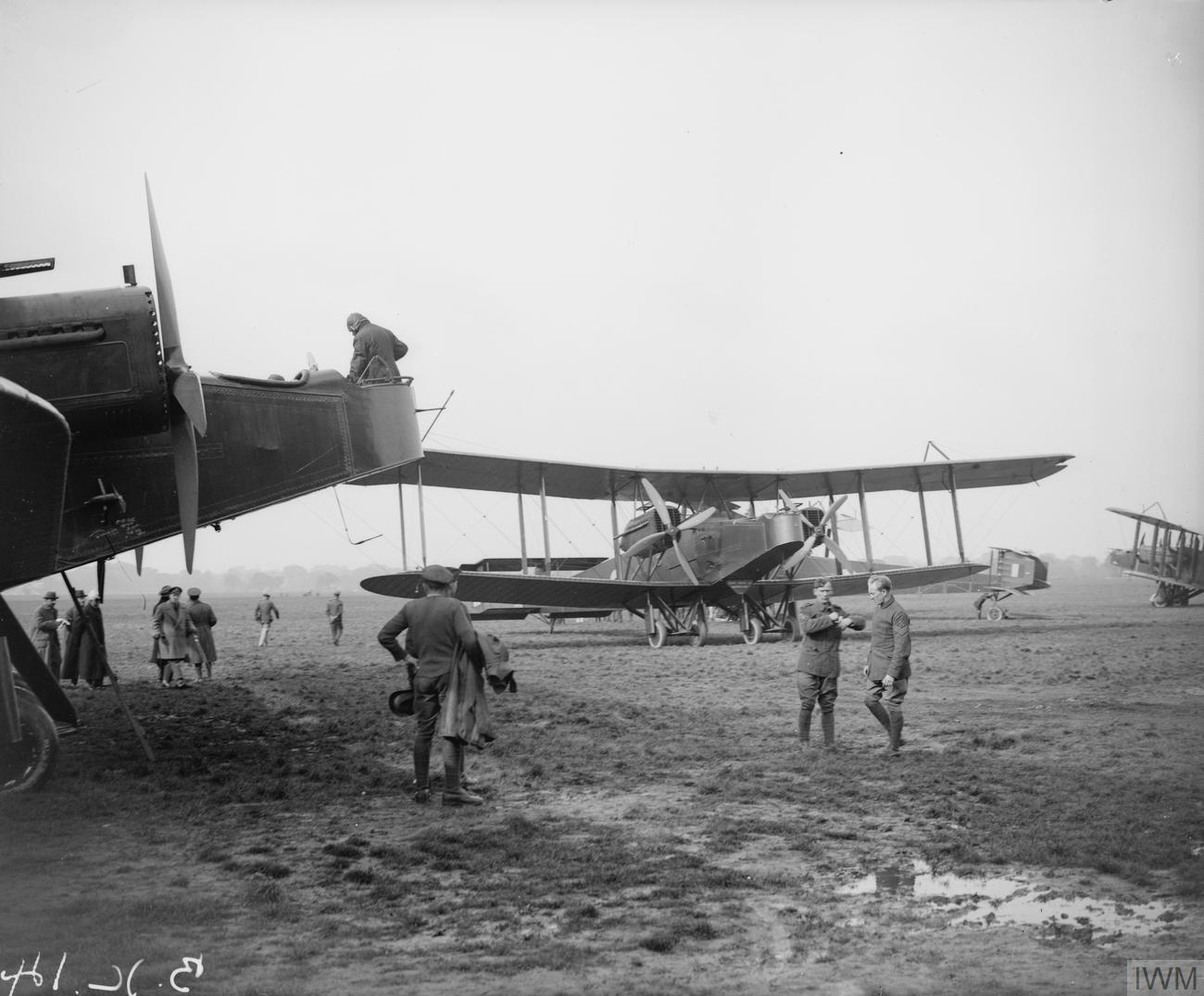
Independent Force O/400s being readied for operations

On the night of 16/17 March 1918, a Handley Page of the Luxeuil Wing bombed a railway junction at Moulins-lès-Metz and in April, individual aircraft bombed a railway junction at Armaville on 5/6 April and a steelworks at Hagendingen and the Chambley airfield on 14/15 April.

The Luxeuil Wing was disbanded in May to equip 10 Squadron RNAS for operations on the Western Front against the German spring offensive. In September 1918, the 41st Wing was formed at Manston with the Handley Pages of "A" Squadron RNAS, for night bombing, and flown to Ochey in October. ("A" Squadron was later 16 Squadron RNAS, then from 1 April 1918, 216 Squadron RAF.) On 9 August, 97 Squadron arrived in France and ten days later, 215 Squadron was transferred, then on 31 August 115 Squadron arrived and 100 Squadron was re-equipped with Handley Pages by September. Operations began with 97 Squadron on 19 August and 215 Squadron three nights later. Cologne railway station was bombed by two 216 Squadron aircraft on 21/22 August and six attacks were made on the German chemical industry, the raid on 25 August by two 215 Squadron aircraft on the works at Mannheim being particularly accurate. Five aircraft of 216 Squadron attacked on 2/3 September, one bomb causing M400,000 worth of damage and the first attack by 115 Squadron was made on 16/17 September, when seven Handley Pages were lost, variously to engine-trouble or anti-aircraft fire.

The improved O/400 began entering service in April 1918, gradually allowing the re-equipment of more squadrons. The O/400s could carry the new 1,650 lb (750 kg) bombs, which were aimed with the Drift Sight Mk 1A bombsight. Each raid was conducted by up to forty O/400s. On the night of 21/22 October, four Handley Pages attacked Kaiserslautern with heavy bombs and four dropped incendiaries. Three heavy bombers and two incendiary bombers caused M500,000 of damage and Kaiserslautern was bombed again on 23/24 October, along with Koblenz, Mannheim and Wiesbaden. The bombers were again diverted to army support during the month, and on the night of 9/10 October, 97, 215 and 216 Squadrons bombed Metz, one bomb hitting a powder store and rocked the town, the damage being estimated by the Germans at M1,000,000. Operations were reduced during the last days of the war by weather but several aerodromes were attacked, particularly that at Morhange.

== Post-1918 history ==
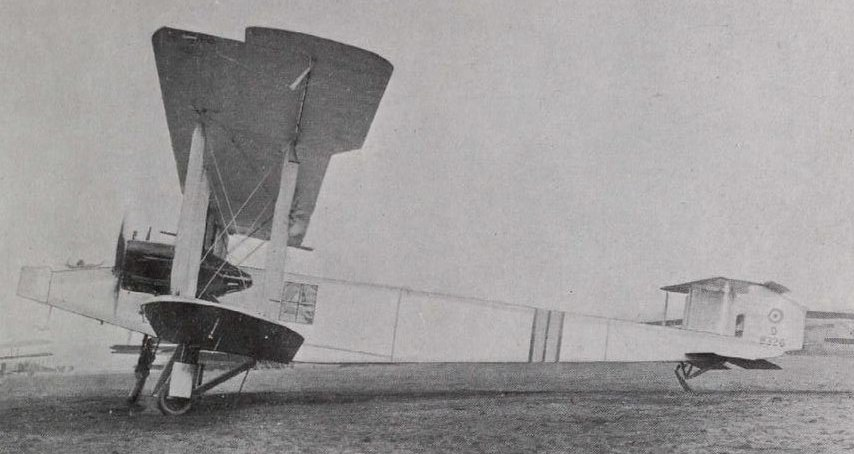
HMAL "Silver Star"

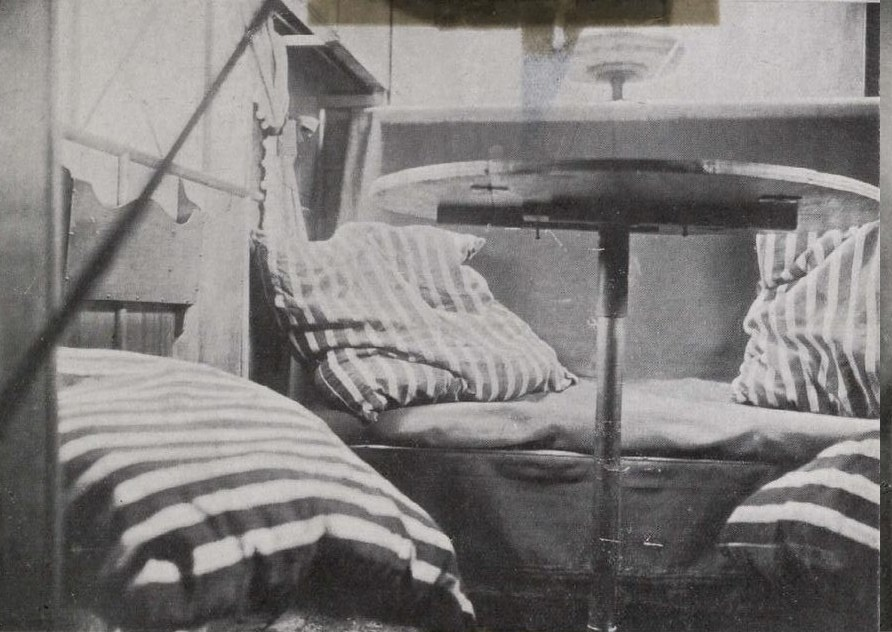
One of the Cabins of "Silver Star."

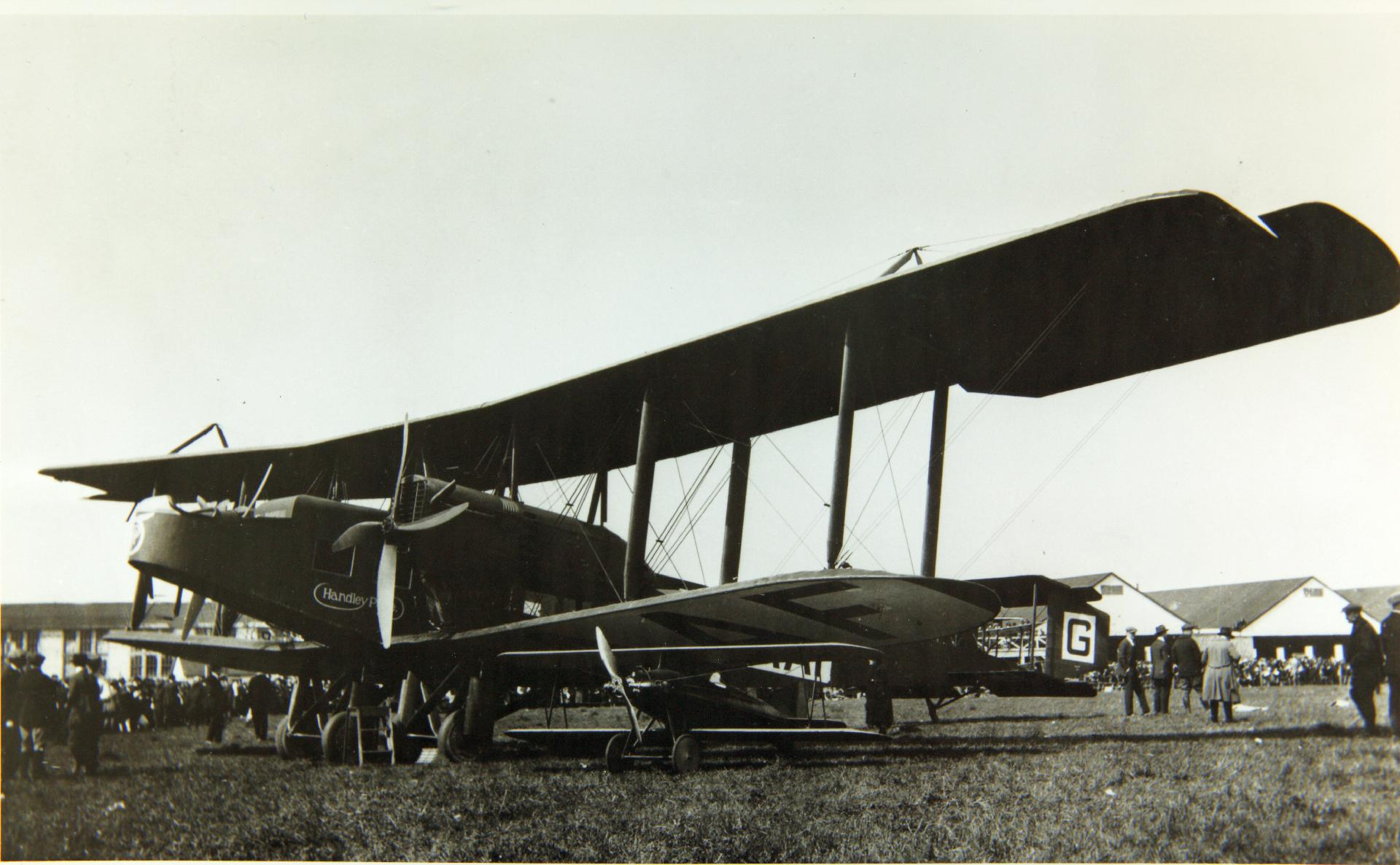
Handley Page O/7 airliner

After the war, O/400s remained in squadron service until replaced by the Vickers Vimy toward the end of 1919. War-surplus aircraft were converted for civilian use in the UK and nine were used by Handley Page Transport. Eight O/400s were fitted to carry passengers and operated by 86 (Communication) Wing from Hendon, to provide transport between London and Paris for the officials negotiating the Treaty of Versailles. Two were fitted as VIP transports and finished in silver aircraft dope, named His Majesty's Air Liner (HMAL) Great Britain and HMAL Silver Star, and the others, seating eight, retained their dark green finish. The first ever in-flight movie, 1925's silent The Lost World, was shown on a Type O, on the London to Paris flight by Imperial Airways in April 1925.

Six aircraft were sold to the Republic of China as O/7 transports, and following delivery to China were re-assembled at Nanyuan, near Beijing. The aircraft flew their first airmail and passengers between Beijing and Tientsin on 7 May 1920. Civil war disrupted these services and they were taken over by various warlords.

== Variants ==
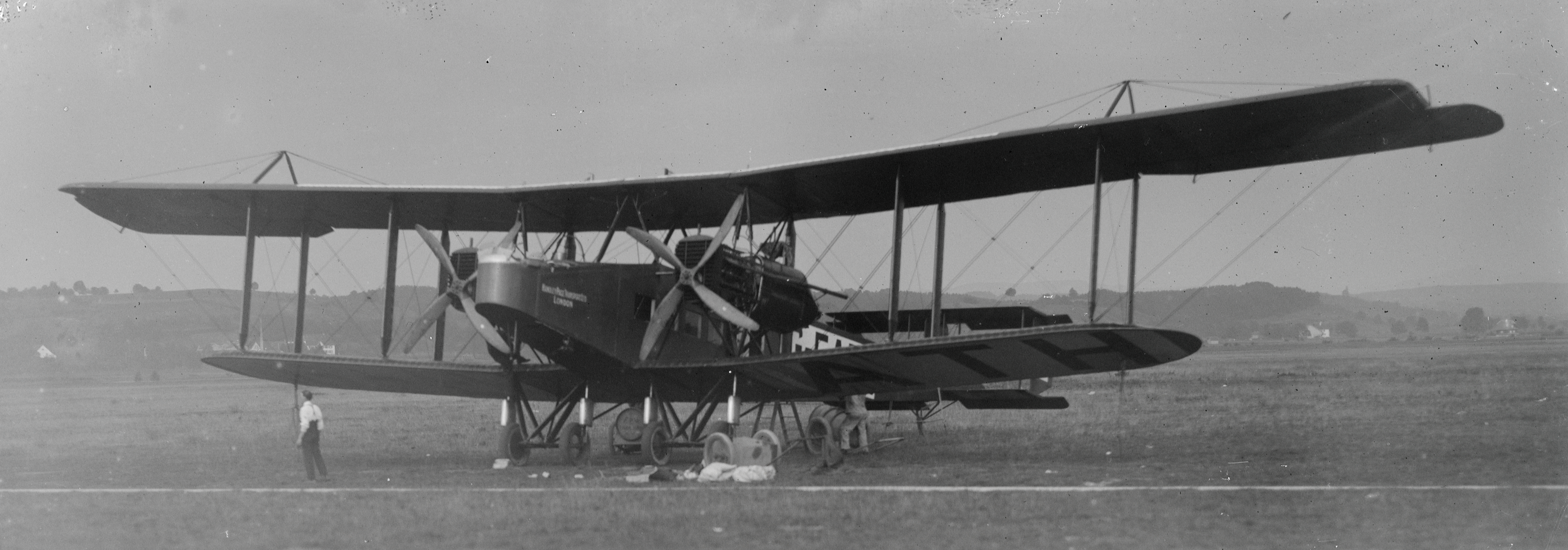
Handley Page O.10 G-EATH

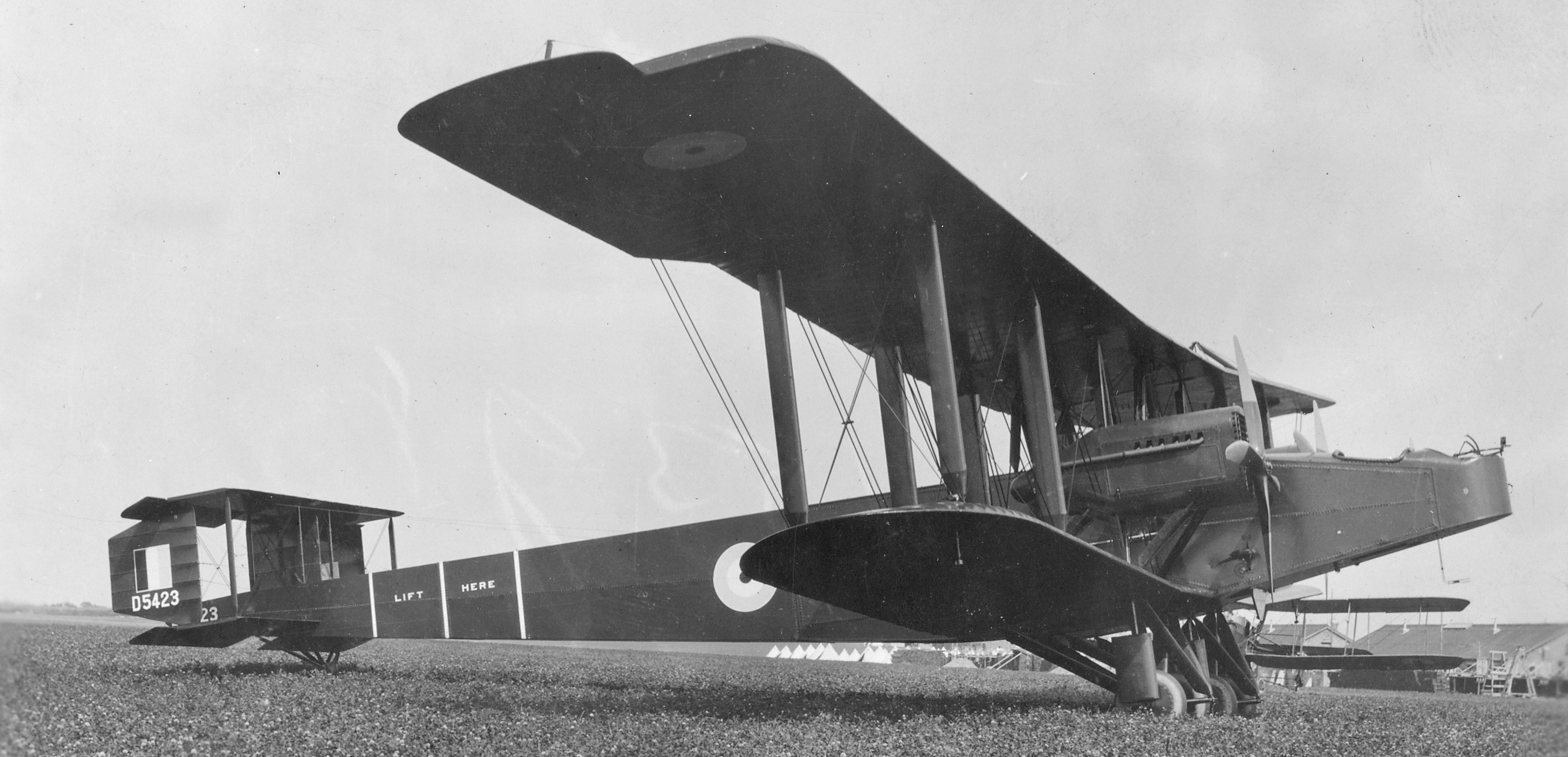
Standard Handley Page O/400

Before 1924, Handley Page used an alphabetical system for aircraft designations and the Type O followed the Type M and Type N. Type Os are frequently misnamed with the numeral "0" instead of the letter "O". The company designations "H.P.11" and "H.P.12" were applied retrospectively after HP switched to type numbers in 1924.

O/100
RNAS bomber. Two 260 hp (190 kW) Rolls-Royce Eagle II engines. Four prototypes and 42 production aircraft built.
O/400
Improved bomber for RNAS/RAF. Two 360 hp (270 kW) Rolls-Royce Eagle VIII engines. 554 built.
O/7
Civilian export version, carrying 8–14 passengers. Fuel tanks moved from fuselage into lengthened nacelles. Twelve converted, six for China, two for South Africa, and four used in India.
O/700
Single hybrid aircraft, made up from the remains of crashed O/400 F5414, and initially identified as type "O/700" (later known as the thirteenth O/7). This was used for test purposes, making a few cross-channel flights in 1919 as G-EAAF, and ended up used for exhibition flights in the USA between 1921 and 1923.
O/10
12 passenger transport. 10 converted.
O/11
Mixed passenger/cargo O/7 variant with two passengers up front and three in the tail, with freight in between. Three conversions.

== Operators ==
=== Civil ===
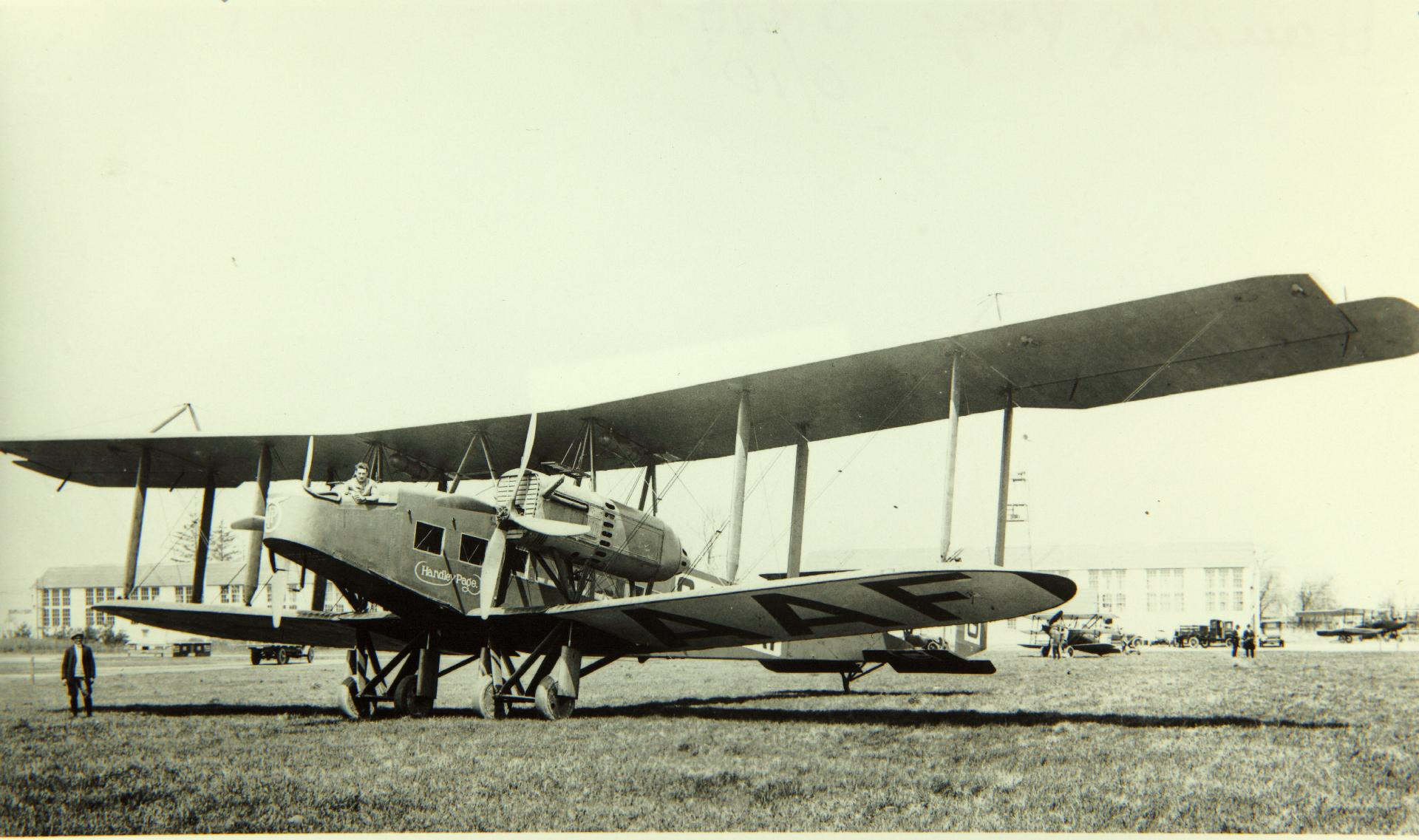
Handley Page type O/7 airliner

(Republic of China (1912–1949)) Republic of China
The Government of China

India
Indo Burmese Transport

Poland
The Polish Government bought one aircraft in 1920.

United Kingdom
Handley Page Transport

=== Military ===
Australia

- Australian Flying Corps
  - No. 1 Squadron AFC in Palestine.

(Republic of China (1912–1949)) Republic of China

- Anhui clique - Ordered six O/400 in February 1919. Following the Zhili-Anhui War, these would be seized by the Fengtian and Zhili cliques.

United Kingdom

- Royal Air Force
  - No. 58 Squadron RAF (O/400)
  - No. 70 Squadron RAF (O/400)
  - No. 97 Squadron RAF (O/400)
  - No. 100 Squadron RAF (O/400)
  - No. 115 Squadron RAF (O/400)
  - No. 116 Squadron RAF (O/400)
  - No. 207 Squadron RAF (O/400)
  - No. 214 Squadron RAF (O/400)
  - No. 215 Squadron RAF (O/100 and O/400)
  - No. 216 Squadron RAF (O/400)

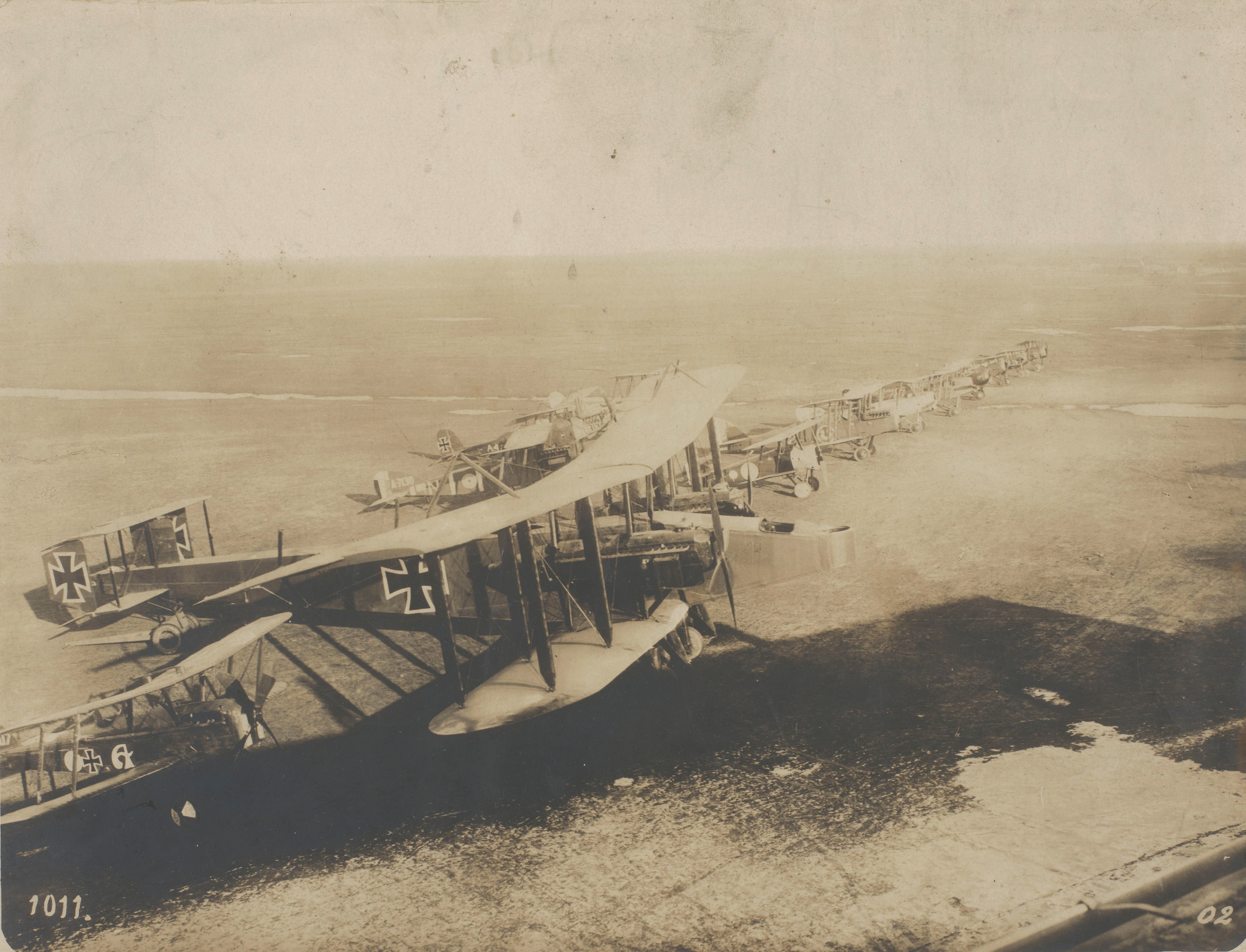
Captured O/100 in German markings.

- Royal Naval Air Service
  - No. 7 Squadron RNAS (O/100)
  - No. 7A Squadron RNAS (O/100)
  - No. 14 Squadron RNAS (O/100)
  - No. 15 Squadron RNAS (O/100)
  - No. 16 Squadron RNAS (O/100 and O/400)

United States

- United States Army Air Service
  - Handley Page Squadron (O/100 and O/400)

=== Captured aircraft ===
An early O/100, which had flown from Manston Airfield, developed engine trouble and landed behind German lines on 1 January 1917. The five crew members became prisoners of war and the aircraft was flown in German markings until it was wrecked.

== Accidents and incidents ==
- On 19 August 1918, RAF Type O/400 D4593 crashed at Maxstoke during a test flight from Castle Bromwich Aerodrome, killing all seven on board. Fabric from a wing tore off, causing a loss of control.
- On 17 May 1919, a Type O/400 carrying T. E. Lawrence ('Lawrence of Arabia') to Egypt crashed at Roma-Centocelle airport. Pilot and co-pilot were killed while Lawrence survived the incident with a broken shoulder blade and two broken ribs.
- On 14 December 1920, a Handley Page Transport O/400 (G-EAMA), operating from the company airfield at Cricklewood, crashed on take-off when it hit a tree at Golders Green, killing the two crew and two of the six passengers.
- On 31 March 1922, all 14 persons aboard a Type O/7 operated by Beijing-Han Airlines were killed when the plane struck the tops of trees while making its approach to Nanyuan Airport in Peiping.

== Surviving aircraft ==
No complete example of any Type O aircraft remains. The Royal Air Force Museum Cosford has several relics, including pieces of fabric from an O/100 and various small O/400 components and five O/400 wing sections which had been used as part of a shed roof in Flintshire until their recovery in late 2013. While there are no extant airframes, a detailed cockpit reproduction is on display at Stow Maries Great War Aerodrome, near Maldon in Essex.

== Specifications (O/400) ==
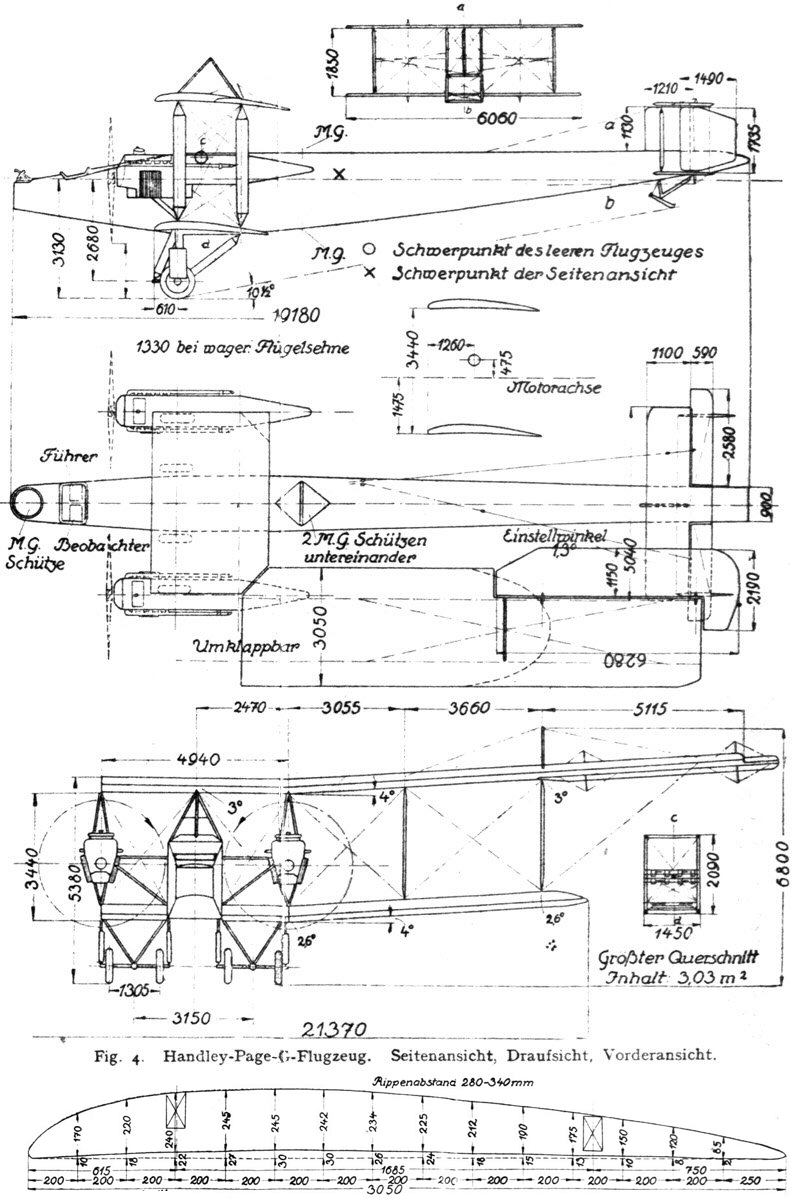
Handley Page O/100 type drawing

Data from The British Bomber since 1914 and The War in the Air Appendices

General characteristics

- Crew: 4 or 5
- Length: 62 ft 10.25 in (19.1580 m)
- Wingspan: 100 ft (30 m)
- Height: 22 ft (6.7 m)
- Wing area: 1,648 sq ft (153.1 m^{2})
- Empty weight: 8,502 lb (3,856 kg)
- Gross weight: 14,022 lb (6,360 kg)
- Max takeoff weight: 13,360 lb (6,060 kg)
- Powerplant: 2 × Rolls-Royce Eagle VIII V-12 water-cooled piston engines, 360 hp (270 kW) each
- Propellers: 4-bladed fixed-pitch wooden propellers

Performance

- Maximum speed: 97.5 mph (156.9 km/h, 84.7 kn)
- Range: 700 mi (1,100 km, 610 nmi)
- Endurance: 8 hours
- Service ceiling: 8,500 ft (2,600 m)
- Rate of climb: 240 ft/min (1.2 m/s)
- Time to altitude: 5,000 ft (1,524 m) in 23 minutes

Armament

- Guns: 5 × 0.303 in (7.7 mm) Lewis Guns (2 on nose Scarff ring, 2 on dorsal position and 1 at ventral hatch)
- Bombs: Up to 2,000 lb (910 kg) of bombs

== See also ==
Related development

- Handley Page W.8
- Handley Page V/1500

Aircraft of comparable role, configuration, and era

- Vickers Vimy
- Gotha G.IV
- AEG G.V
- Sikorsky Ilya Muromets
- Caproni Ca.32

Related lists

- List of aircraft of the Fleet Air Arm
- List of bomber aircraft
- List of aircraft of the Royal Air Force
