= Maxstoke air crash =

1918 air crash in North Warwickshire, England

Coordinates: 52°28′N 1°39′W

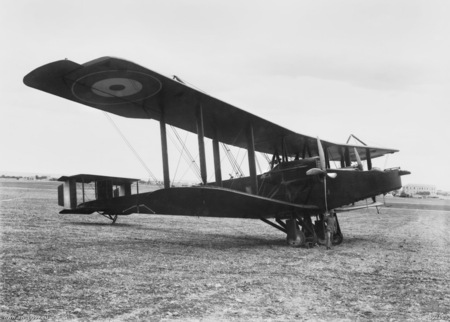
- A Handley Page O/400 similar to the accident aircraft

Accident
- Date: 19 August 1918
- Summary: Wing Failure
- Site: Maxstoke, North Warwickshire, England, United Kingdom

Aircraft
- Aircraft type: Handley Page O/400
- Operator: Royal Air Force
- Registration: D4593
- Flight origin: Castle Bromwich Aerodrome, England, United Kingdom
- Passengers: 1
- Crew: 6
- Fatalities: 7
- Injuries: 0
- Survivors: 0

The Maxstoke air crash occurred on the 19 August 1918. A No. 14 Aircraft Acceptance Park Handley Page O/400 of the Royal Air Force took off from Castle Bromwich Aerodrome. The aircraft was taking part of a test flight, testing a dynamo and lighting system. While flying over North Warwickshire, the pilots lost control of the aircraft and crashed into a field at Maxstoke, North Warwickshire, killing all seven crew on board. The pilots were Canadian Lt. Robert Edward Andrew MacBeth and Lt. Frederick James Bravery. The other crew were air mechanics. Charles William Offord was testing the dynamo and lighting system and J May was performing a rigging test. Albert J. Winrow and H. Simmons were to make up war load to pilot's instructions and G. Greenland was responsible for the petrol pumps. MacBeth and Simmons were buried in the Maxstoke cemetery.

The cause of the accident was determined to be loss of control due to wing failure when the aircraft lost fabric from a wing. It was the deadliest accident involving the Royal Air Force at the time.
