= Flight 115 =

Flight 115 may refer to the following accidents involving commercial airliners:

Listed chronologically

- BOAC Flight 115, destroyed (without fatality) after over-running a runway on 26 October 1952
- Pan Am Flight 115, suffered a jet upset and narrowly avoided crashing on 3 February 1959
- Japan Air Lines Flight 115, suffered a tailstrike on 2 June 1978, leading to a later mechanical failure and crash in 1985

== See also ==
- STS-115, a successful Space Shuttle mission in September 2006
