= Cocooning (aircraft) =

Machinery storage in protective coating

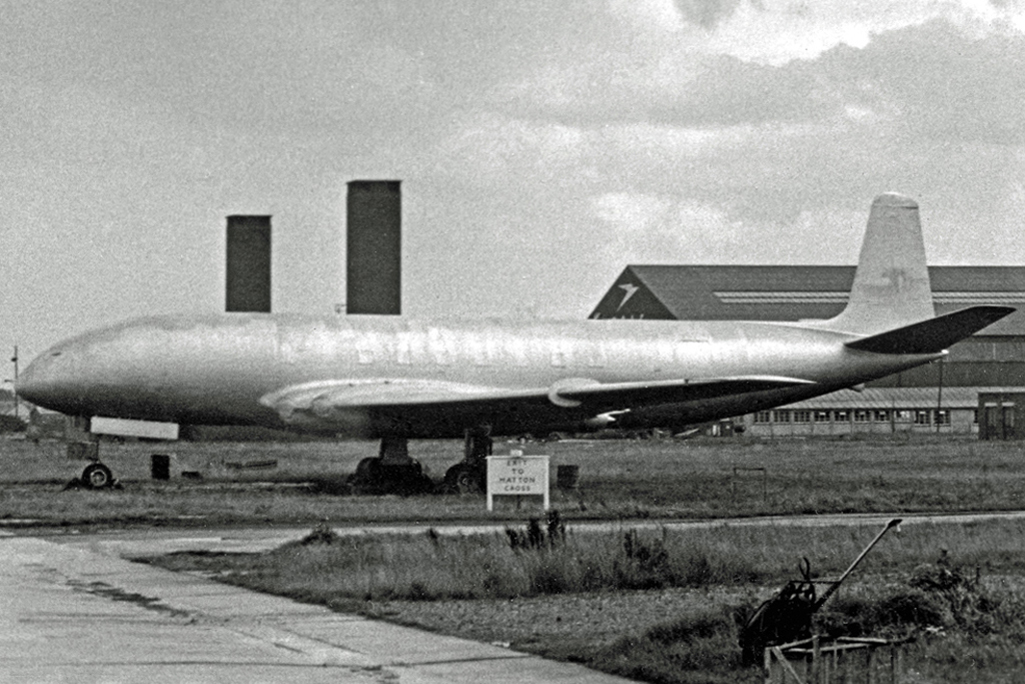
A De Havilland Comet 1 of BOAC stored cocooned at London Heathrow Airport after the Comet crashes in 1954.

Cocooning (also known as Mothballing) is the practice of coating stored equipment or machinery (typically aircraft) with polyvinyl plastic for protection from the elements and outside effects that could be damaging to the airframe.

== See also ==
- Aircraft boneyard
