= De Havilland Comet =

First commercial jet airliner, four-engined

de Havilland DH.106 Comet
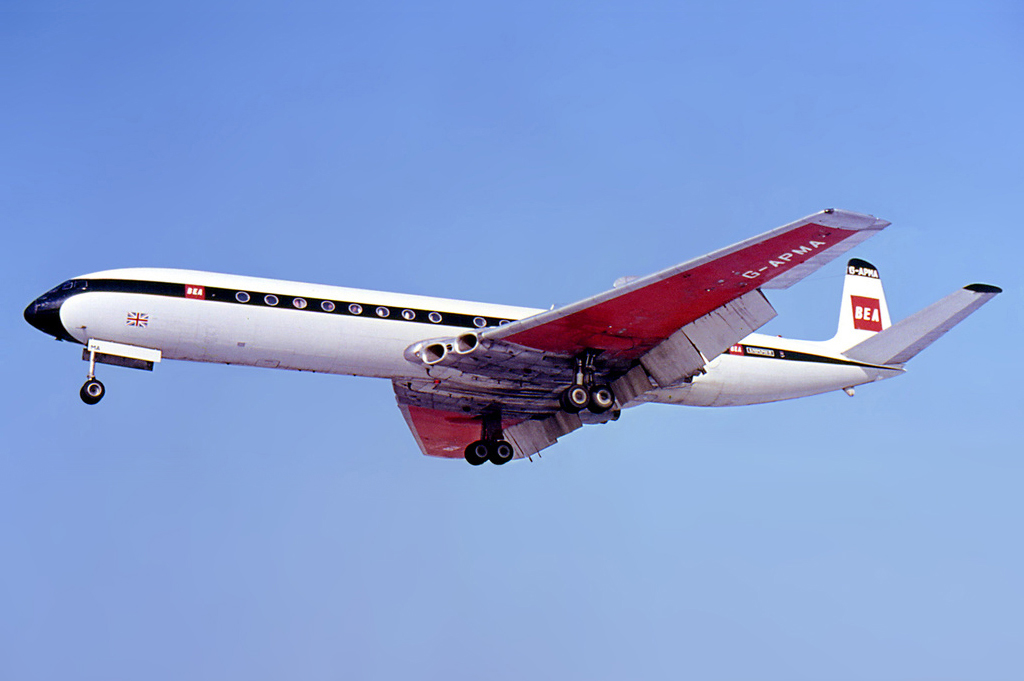
- British European Airways (BEA) Comet 4B, 1969

General information
- Type: Narrow-body jet airliner
- National origin: United Kingdom
- Manufacturer: de Havilland
- Status: Retired
- Primary users: BOAC: British European Airways; Dan-Air; Royal Air Force
- Number built: 114 (including prototypes) (Note: Total of Comets in production: 114, or 136 (when including refitting of original airframes and conversions).)

History
- Manufactured: 1949–1964
- Introduction date: 2 May 1952 with BOAC
- First flight: 27 July 1949
- Retired: 14 March 1997 (Comet 4C XS235 Canopus)
- Developed into: Hawker Siddeley Nimrod

The de Havilland DH.106 Comet is a four-engine narrow body aircraft developed and manufactured by de Havilland in the United Kingdom. The world's first commercial jet airliner, the Comet 1 prototype first flew in 1949. It features an aerodynamically clean design with four de Havilland Ghost turbojet engines located in the wing roots, a pressurised cabin, and large windows. For the era, it offered a relatively quiet, comfortable passenger cabin and was commercially promising at its debut in 1952.

Within a year of the airliner's entry into service, three Comets were lost in highly publicised accidents after suffering catastrophic mishaps mid-flight. Two of these were found to be caused by structural failure resulting from metal fatigue in the airframe, a phenomenon not fully understood at the time; the other was due to overstressing of the airframe during flight through severe weather. The Comet was withdrawn from service and extensively tested. Design and construction flaws, including dangerous stress concentrations around square cut-outs for the ADF (automatic direction finder) antennas were ultimately identified. As a result, the Comet was extensively redesigned, with structural reinforcements and other changes. Rival manufacturers heeded the lessons learned from the Comet when developing their own aircraft.

Although sales never fully recovered, the improved Comet 2 and the prototype Comet 3 culminated in the redesigned Comet 4 series which debuted in 1958 and remained in commercial service until 1981. The Comet was also adapted for a variety of military roles such as VIP, medical and passenger transport, as well as surveillance; the last Comet 4, used as a research platform, made its final flight in 1997. The most extensive modification resulted in a specialised maritime patrol derivative, the Hawker Siddeley Nimrod, which remained in service with the Royal Air Force until 2011, over 60 years after the Comet's first flight.

== Development ==
=== Origins ===
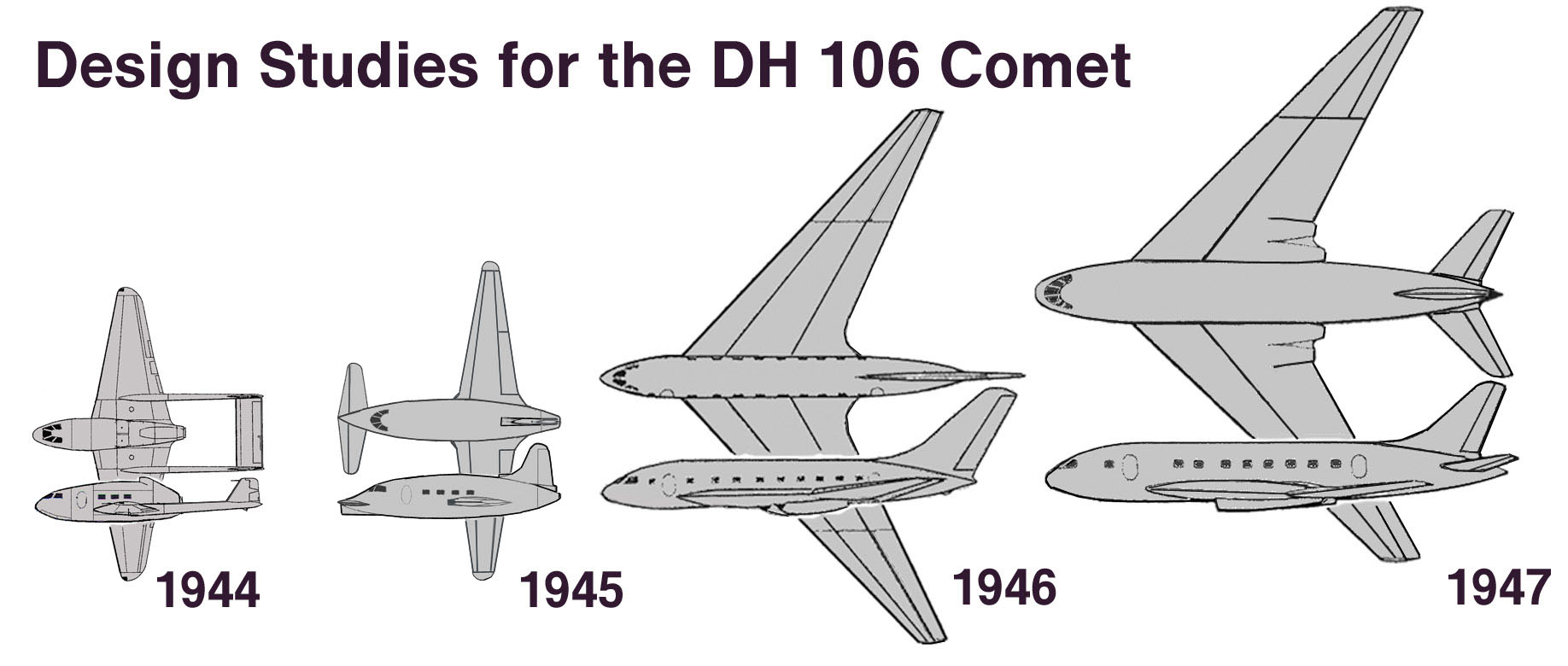
Design studies for the DH.106 Comet 1944–1947 (artist's impression)

On 11 March 1943, the Cabinet of the United Kingdom formed the Brabazon Committee, which was tasked with determining the UK's airliner needs after the conclusion of the Second World War. One of its recommendations was for the development and production of a pressurised, transatlantic mailplane that could carry 1 long ton (2,200 lb; 1,000 kg) of payload at a cruising speed of 400 mph (640 km/h) non-stop.

Aviation company de Havilland was interested in this requirement, but chose to challenge the then widely held view that jet engines were too fuel-hungry and unreliable for such a role. (Note: During the same era, both Lockheed with their Lockheed L-188 Electra and Vickers with the ground-breaking Vickers Viscount discounted the advantages of "pure" jet power to develop turboprop-powered airliners.) As a result, committee member Sir Geoffrey de Havilland, head of the de Havilland company, used his personal influence and his company's expertise to champion the development of a jet-propelled aircraft, proposing a specification for a pure turbojet-powered design.

The committee accepted the proposal, calling it the "Type IV" (of five designs), (Note: The "Type IV" Specifications issued on 3 February 1943 provided for a "high-speed mail-carrying airliner, gas-turbine powered.") and in 1945 awarded a development and production contract to de Havilland under the designation Type 106. The type and design were to be so advanced that de Havilland had to undertake the design and development of both the airframe and the engines. This was because in 1945 no turbojet engine manufacturer in the world was drawing up a design specification for an engine with the thrust and specific fuel consumption that could power an aircraft at the proposed cruising altitude (40,000 ft (12,000 m)), speed, and transatlantic range as was called for by the Type 106. First-phase development of the DH.106 focused on short- and intermediate-range mailplanes with small passenger compartments and as few as six seats, before being redefined as a long-range airliner with a capacity of 24 seats. Out of all the Brabazon designs, the DH.106 was seen as the riskiest: both in terms of introducing untried design elements and for the financial commitment involved. Nevertheless, the British Overseas Airways Corporation (BOAC) found the Type IV's specifications attractive, and initially proposed a purchase of 25 aircraft; in December 1945, when a firm contract was created, the order total was revised to 10.

During the next few years, the UK has an opportunity, which may not recur, of developing aircraft manufacture as one of our main export industries. On whether we grasp this opportunity and so establish firmly an industry of the utmost strategic and economic importance, our future as a great nation may depend.

— Duncan Sandys, Minister of Supply, 1952.

A design team was formed in 1946 under the leadership of chief designer Ronald Bishop, who had been responsible for the Mosquito fighter-bomber. Several unorthodox configurations were considered, ranging from canard to tailless designs; (Note: From 1944 to 1946, the design group prepared submissions on a three-engined twin-boom design, a three-engined canard design with engines mounted in the rear, and a tailless design that featured a swept wing and four "podded" engines.) All were rejected. The Ministry of Supply was interested in the most radical of the proposed designs, and ordered two experimental tailless DH 108s (Note: The Ministry of Supply's order for DH 108s was listed as Operational Requirement OR207 to Specification E.18/45.) to serve as proof of concept aircraft for testing swept-wing configurations in both low-speed and high-speed flight. During flight tests, the DH 108 gained a reputation for being accident-prone and unstable, leading de Havilland and BOAC to gravitate to conventional configurations and, necessarily, designs with less technical risk. The DH 108s were later modified to test the DH.106's power controls.

In September 1946, before completion of the DH 108s, BOAC requests necessitated a redesign of the DH.106 from its previous 24-seat configuration to a larger 36-seat version. (Note: BOAC's requested capacity increase was known as Specification 22/46.) With no time to develop the technology necessary for a proposed tailless configuration, Bishop opted for a more conventional 20-degree swept-wing design (Note: The wing was drastically redesigned from a 40˚ sweep.) with unswept tail surfaces, married to an enlarged fuselage accommodating 36 passengers in a four-abreast arrangement with a central aisle. Replacing previously specified Halford H.1 Goblin engines, four new, more-powerful Rolls-Royce Avons were to be incorporated in pairs buried in the wing roots; Halford H.2 Ghost engines were eventually applied as an interim solution while the Avons cleared certification. The redesigned aircraft was named the DH.106 Comet in December 1947. (Note: The name "Comet", previously used by the de Havilland DH.88 racing aircraft, was revived.) Revised first orders from BOAC and British South American Airways (Note: British South American Airways merged with BOAC in 1949.) totalled 14 aircraft, with delivery projected for 1952.

=== Testing and prototypes ===
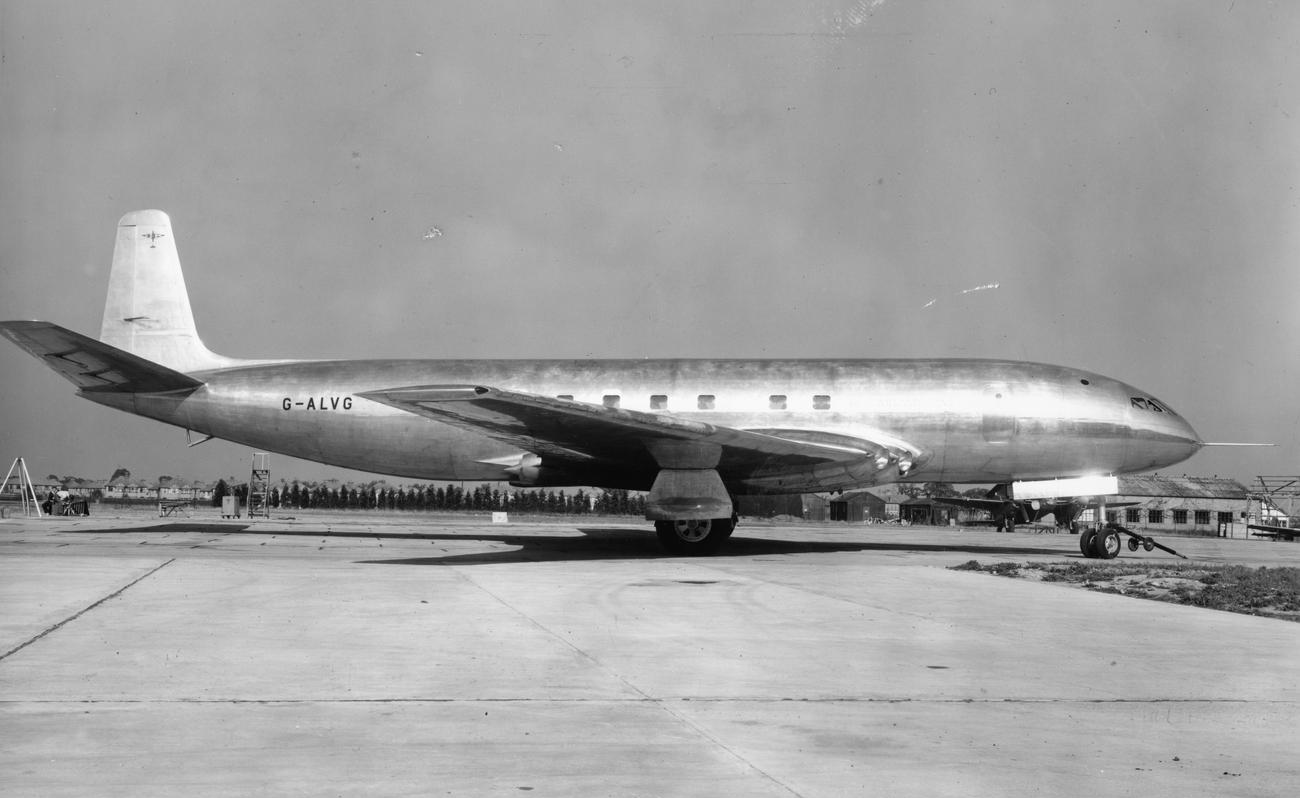
Comet 1 prototype (with square windows) at Hatfield Aerodrome in 1949

As the Comet represented a new category of passenger aircraft, more rigorous testing was a development priority. From 1947 to 1948, de Havilland conducted an extensive research and development phase, including the use of several stress test rigs at Hatfield Aerodrome for small components and large assemblies alike. Sections of pressurised fuselage were subjected to high-altitude flight conditions via a large decompression chamber on-site (Note: The fuselage sections and nose simulated a flight up to 70,000 ft (21,000 m) at a temperature of −70 °C (−94 °F), with 2,000 applications of pressure at 9 psi (62 kPa).) and tested to failure. Tracing fuselage failure points proved difficult with this method, and de Havilland ultimately switched to conducting structural tests with a water tank that could be safely configured to increase pressures gradually. The entire forward fuselage section was tested for metal fatigue by repeatedly pressurising to 2.75 pounds per square inch (19.0 kPa) overpressure and depressurising through more than 16,000 cycles, equivalent to about 40,000 hours of airline service. The windows were also tested under a pressure of 12 psi (83 kPa), 4.75 psi (32.8 kPa) above expected pressures at the normal service ceiling of 36,000 ft (11,000 m). One window frame survived 100 psi (690 kPa), about 1,250 per cent over the maximum pressure it was expected to encounter in service.

The first prototype DH.106 Comet (carrying Class B markings G-5-1) was completed in 1949 and was initially used to conduct ground tests and brief early flights. The prototype's maiden flight, out of Hatfield Aerodrome, took place on 27 July 1949 and lasted 31 minutes. At the controls was de Havilland chief test pilot John "Cats Eyes" Cunningham, a famous night-fighter pilot of the Second World War, along with co-pilot Harold "Tubby" Waters, engineers John Wilson (electrics) and Frank Reynolds (hydraulics), and flight test observer Tony Fairbrother.

The prototype was registered G-ALVG just before it was publicly displayed at the 1949 Farnborough Airshow before the start of flight trials. A year later, the second prototype G-5-2 made its maiden flight. The second prototype was registered G-ALZK in July 1950 and it was used by the BOAC Comet Unit at Hurn from April 1951 to carry out 500 flying hours of crew training and route-proving. Australian airline Qantas also sent its own technical experts to observe the performance of the prototypes, seeking to quell internal uncertainty about its prospective Comet purchase. Both prototypes could be externally distinguished from later Comets by the large single-wheeled main landing gear, which was replaced on production models starting with G-ALYP by four-wheeled bogies.

== Design ==
=== Overview ===
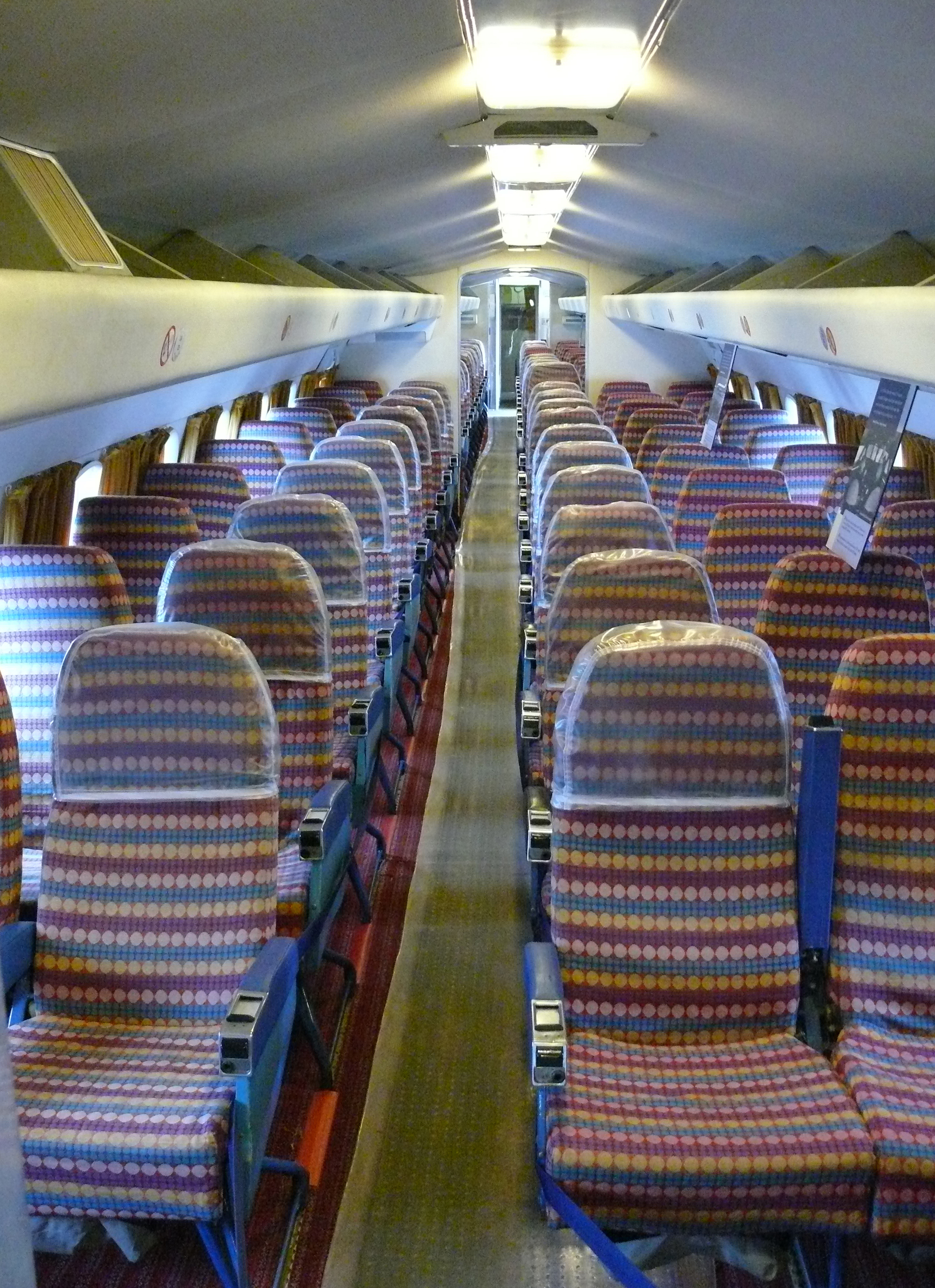
Dan-Air Comet 4C cabin at the National Museum of Flight

The Comet was an all-metal low-wing cantilever monoplane powered by four jet engines; it had a four-place cockpit occupied by two pilots, a flight engineer, and a navigator. The clean, low-drag design of the aircraft featured many design elements that were fairly uncommon at the time, including a swept-wing leading edge, integral wing fuel tanks, and four-wheel bogie main undercarriage units designed by de Havilland. Two pairs of turbojet engines (on the Comet 1s, Halford H.2 Ghosts, subsequently known as de Havilland Ghost 50 Mk1s) were buried in the wings.

The original Comet was the approximate length of, but not as wide as, the later Boeing 737-100, and carried fewer people in a significantly more-spacious environment. BOAC installed 36 reclining "slumberseats" with 45 in (1,100 mm) centres on its first Comets, allowing for greater leg room in front and behind; Air France had 11 rows of seats with four seats to a row installed on its Comets. Large picture window views and table seating accommodations for a row of passengers afforded a feeling of comfort and luxury unusual for transportation of the period. Amenities included a galley that could serve hot and cold food and drinks, a bar, and separate men's and women's toilets. Provisions for emergency situations included several life rafts stored in the wings near the engines, and individual life vests were stowed under each seat.

One of the most striking aspects of Comet travel was the quiet, "vibration-free flying" as touted by BOAC. (Note: BOAC flight crew revelled in standing a pen on end and pointing that out to passengers; invariably, the pen remained upright throughout the entire flight.) For passengers used to piston-engined propeller-driven airliners, smooth and quiet jet flight was a novel experience.

=== Avionics and systems ===
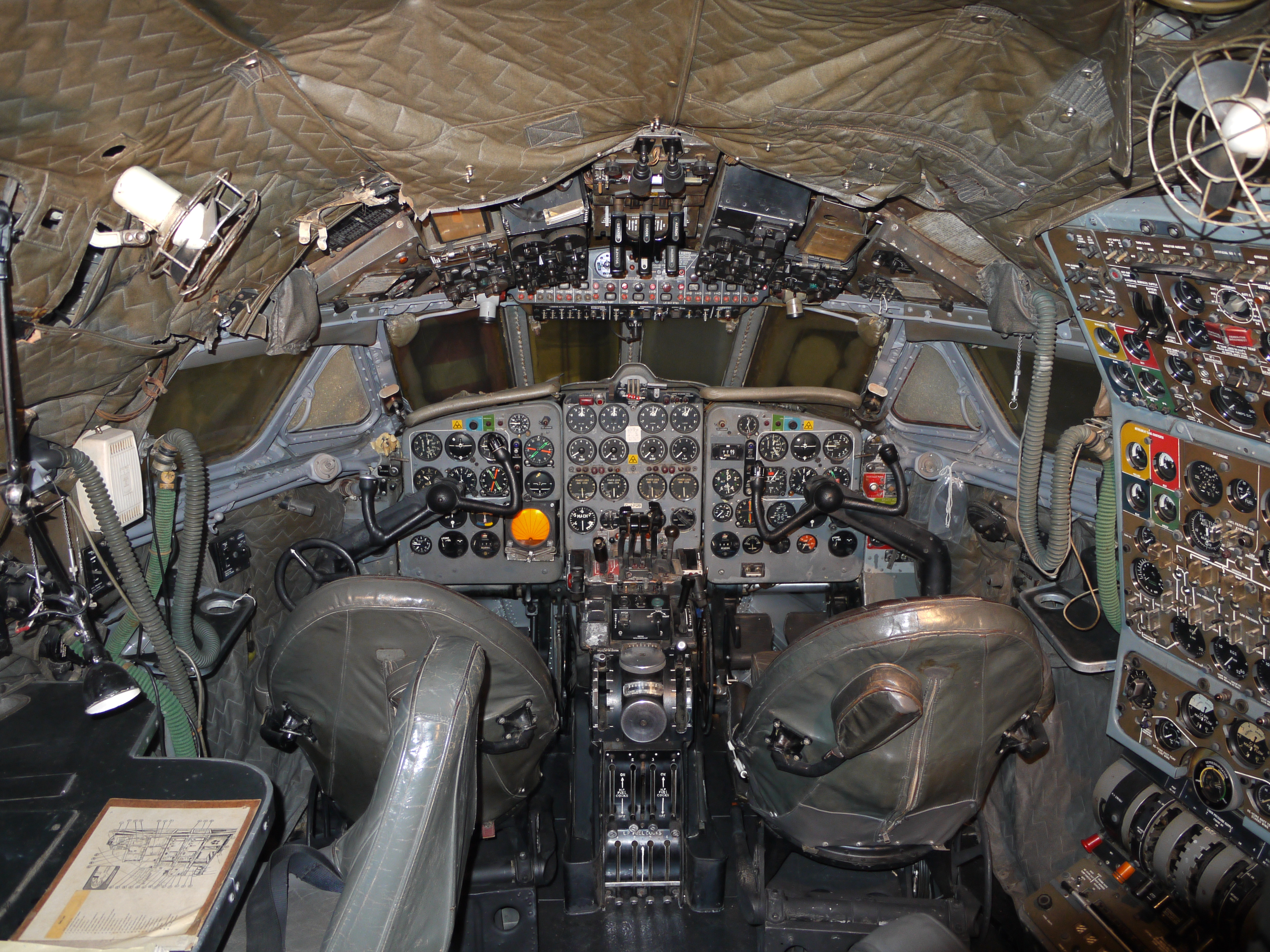
The flight deck of a Comet 4

For ease of training and fleet conversion, de Havilland designed the Comet's flight deck layout with a degree of similarity to the Lockheed Constellation, an aircraft that was popular at the time with key customers such as BOAC. The cockpit included full dual-controls for the captain and first officer, and a flight engineer controlled several key systems, including fuel, air conditioning and electrical systems. The navigator occupied a dedicated station, with a table across from the flight engineer.

Several of the Comet's avionics systems were new to civil aviation. One such feature was irreversible, powered flight controls, which increased the pilot's ease of control and the safety of the aircraft by preventing aerodynamic forces from changing the directed positions and placement of the aircraft's control surfaces. Many of the control surfaces, such as the elevators, were equipped with a complex gearing system as a safeguard against accidentally over-stressing the surfaces or airframe at higher speed ranges.

The Comet had a total of four hydraulic systems: two primaries, one secondary, and a final emergency system for basic functions such as lowering the undercarriage. The undercarriage could also be lowered by a combination of gravity and a hand-pump. Power was syphoned from all four engines for the hydraulics, cabin air conditioning, and the de-icing system; these systems had operational redundancy in that they could keep working even if only a single engine was active. The majority of hydraulic components were centred in a single avionics bay. A pressurised refuelling system, developed by Flight Refuelling Ltd, allowed the Comet's fuel tanks to be refuelled at a far greater rate than by other methods.

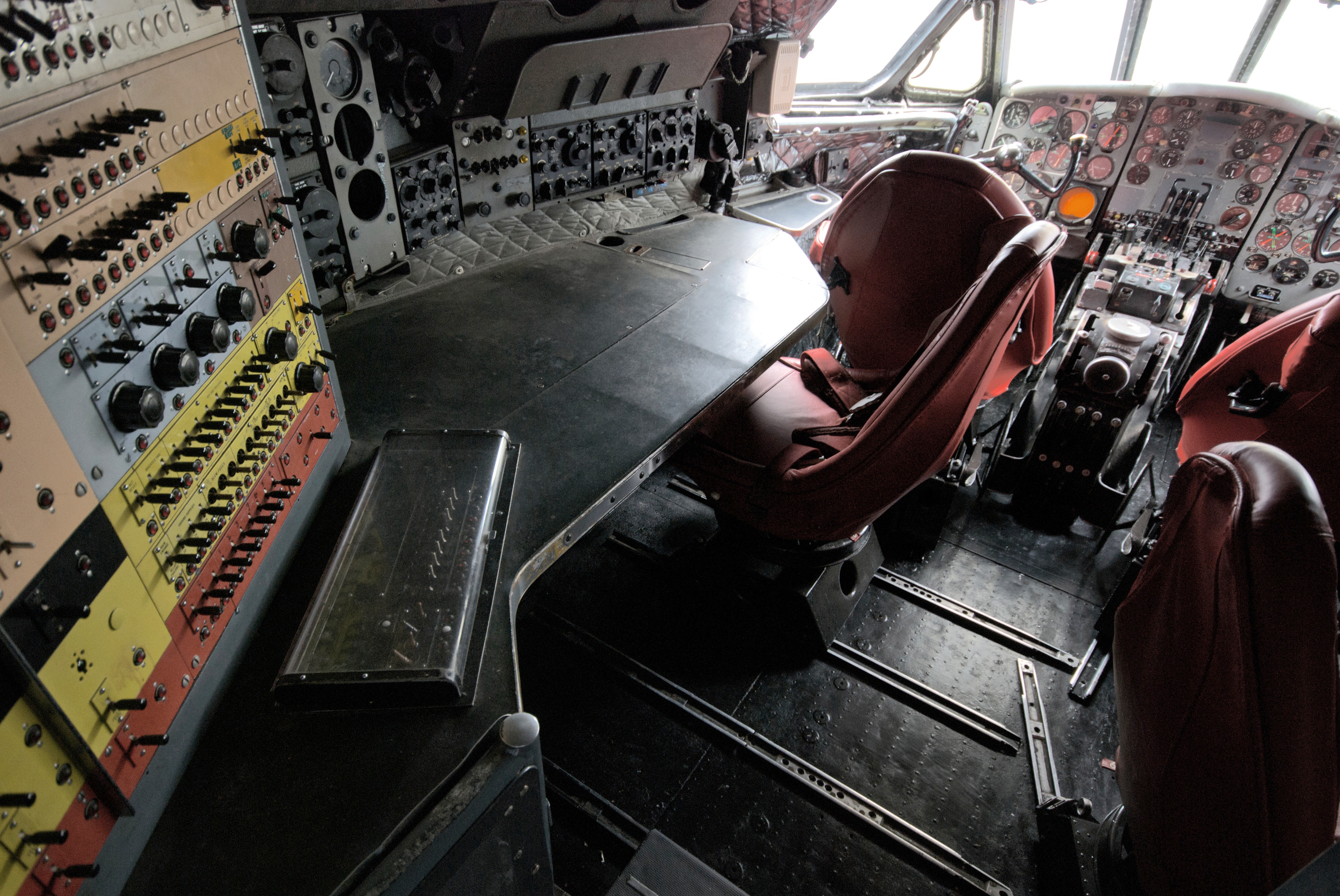
The Comet 4 navigator's station

The cockpit was significantly altered for the Comet 4's introduction, on which an improved layout focusing on the onboard navigational suite was introduced. An EKCO E160 radar unit was installed in the Comet 4's nose cone, providing search functions as well as ground and cloud-mapping capabilities, and a radar interface was built into the Comet 4 cockpit along with redesigned instruments.

Sud-Est's design bureau, while working on the Sud Aviation Caravelle in 1953, licensed several design features from de Havilland, building on previous collaborations on earlier licensed designs, including the DH 100 Vampire; (Note: The Sud-Est SE 530/532/535 Mistral (FB 53) was a single-seat fighter-bomber version of the de Havilland Vampire jet fighter, used by L'Armée de l'Air.) the nose and cockpit layout of the Comet 1 was grafted onto the Caravelle. In 1969, when the Comet 4's design was modified by Hawker Siddeley to become the basis for the Nimrod, the cockpit layout was completely redesigned and bore little resemblance to its predecessors except for the control yoke.

=== Fuselage ===
Diverse geographic destinations and cabin pressurisation alike on the Comet demanded the use of a high proportion of alloys, plastics, and other materials new to civil aviation across the aircraft to meet certification requirements. The Comet's high cabin pressure and high operating speeds were unprecedented in commercial aviation, making its fuselage design an experimental process. At its introduction, Comet airframes would be subjected to an intense, high-speed operating schedule which included simultaneous extreme heat from desert airfields and frosty cold from the kerosene-filled fuel tanks, still cold from cruising at high altitude.

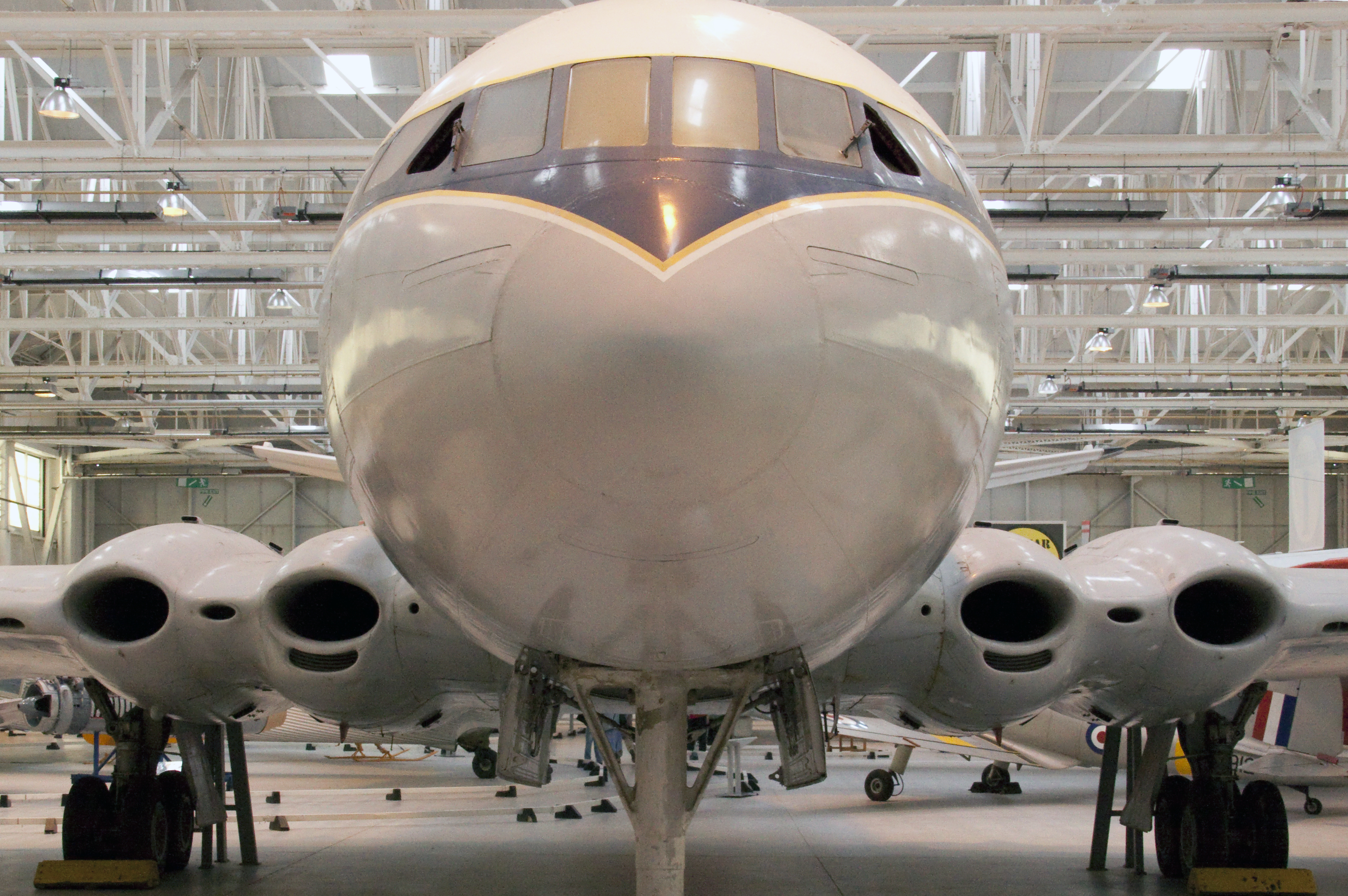
A Comet 1's fuselage and de Havilland Ghost engine intakes

The Comet's thin metal skin was composed of advanced new alloys (Note: Fuselage alloys detailed in Directorate of Technical Development 564/L.73 and DTD 746C/L90.) and was both riveted and chemically bonded, which saved weight and reduced the risk of fatigue cracks spreading from the rivets. The chemical bonding process was accomplished using a new adhesive, Redux, which was liberally used in the construction of the wings and the fuselage of the Comet; it also had the advantage of simplifying the manufacturing process.

When several of the fuselage alloys were discovered to be vulnerable to weakening via metal fatigue, a detailed routine inspection process was introduced. As well as thorough visual inspections of the outer skin, mandatory structural sampling was routinely conducted by both civil and military Comet operators. The need to inspect areas not easily viewable by the naked eye led to the introduction of widespread radiography examination in aviation; this also had the advantage of detecting cracks and flaws too small to be seen otherwise.

Operationally, the design of the cargo holds led to considerable difficulty for the ground crew, especially baggage handlers at the airports. The cargo hold had its doors located directly underneath the aircraft, so each item of baggage or cargo had to be loaded vertically upward from the top of the baggage truck, then slid along the hold floor to be stacked inside. The individual pieces of luggage and cargo also had to be retrieved in a similarly slow manner at the arriving airport.

=== Propulsion ===
The Comet was powered by two pairs of turbojet engines buried in the wings close to the fuselage. Chief designer Bishop chose the Comet's embedded-engine configuration because it avoided the drag of podded engines and allowed for a smaller fin and rudder since the hazards of asymmetric thrust were reduced. The engines were outfitted with baffles to reduce noise emissions, and extensive soundproofing was also implemented to improve passenger conditions.

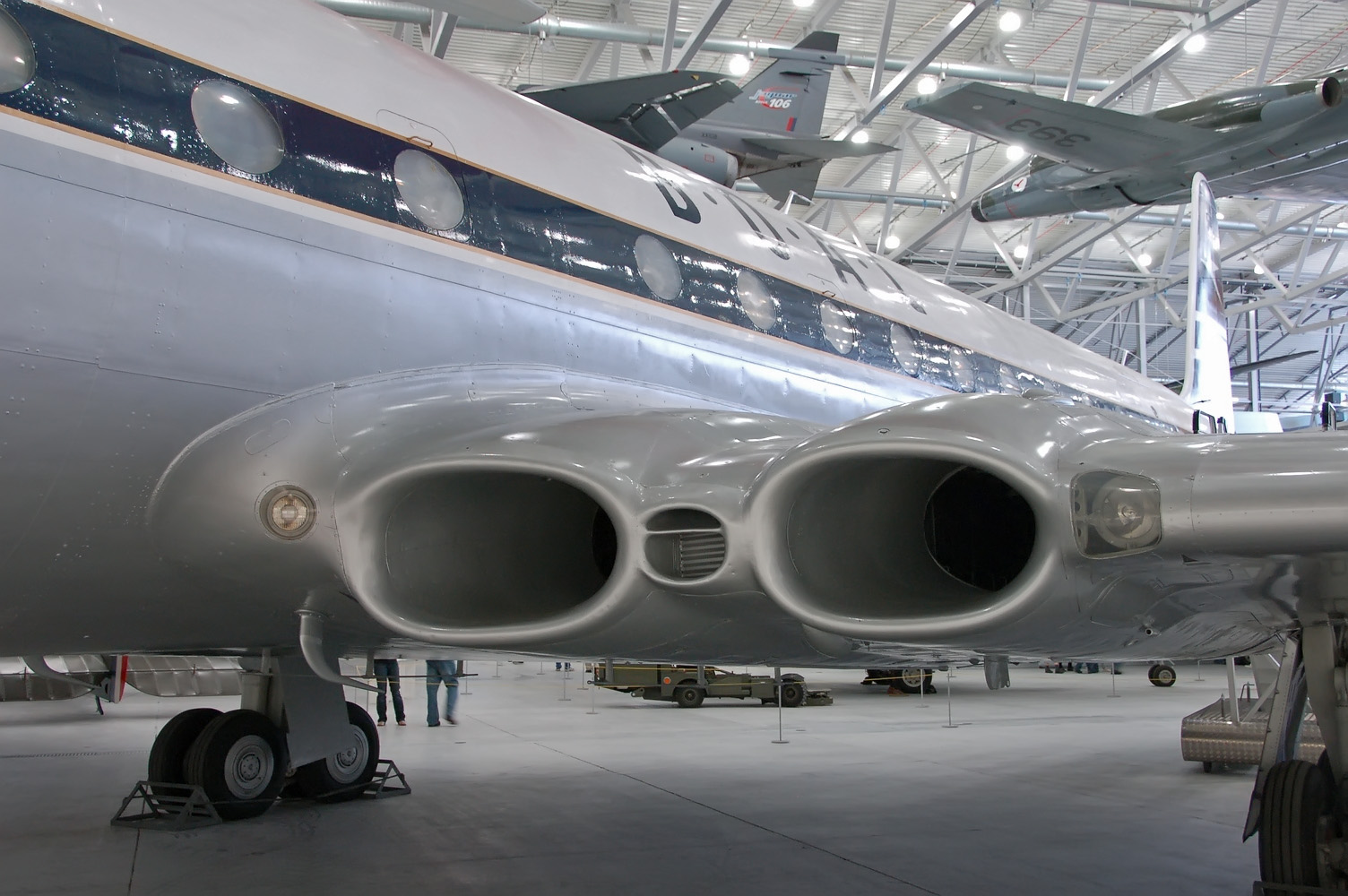
The Comet 4's enlarged Rolls-Royce Avon engine intakes

Placing the engines within the wings had the advantage of a reduction in the risk of foreign object damage, which could seriously damage jet engines. The low-mounted engines and good placement of service panels also made aircraft maintenance easier to perform. The Comet's buried-engine configuration increased its structural weight and complexity. Armour had to be placed around the engine cells to contain debris from any serious engine failures; also, placing the engines inside the wing required a more complex wing structure.

The Comet 1 featured 5,050 lbf (22.5 kN) de Havilland Ghost 50 Mk1 turbojet engines. Two hydrogen peroxide-powered de Havilland Sprite booster rockets were originally intended to be installed to boost takeoff under hot and high altitude conditions from airports such as Khartoum and Nairobi. These were tested on 30 flights, but the Ghosts alone were considered powerful enough and some airlines concluded that rocket motors were impractical. Sprite fittings were retained on production aircraft. Comet 1s subsequently received more powerful 5,700 lbf (25 kN) Ghost DGT3 series engines.

From the Comet 2 onward, the Ghost engines were replaced by the newer and more powerful 7,000 lbf (31 kN) Rolls-Royce Avon AJ.65 engines. To achieve optimum efficiency with the new powerplants, the air intakes were enlarged to increase mass air flow. Upgraded Avon engines were introduced on the Comet 3, and the Avon-powered Comet 4 was highly praised for its takeoff performance from high-altitude locations such as Mexico City where it was operated by Mexicana de Aviacion, a major scheduled passenger air carrier.

== Operational history ==
=== Introduction ===
The earliest production aircraft, registered G-ALYP ("Yoke Peter"), first flew on 9 January 1951 and was subsequently lent to BOAC for development flying by its Comet Unit. On 22 January 1952, the fifth production aircraft, registered G-ALYS, received the first Certificate of Airworthiness awarded to a Comet, six months ahead of schedule. On 2 May 1952, as part of BOAC's route-proving trials, G-ALYP took off on the world's first jetliner (Note: The Avro Canada C102 Jetliner, for which it was coined, first used the term; "jetliner" later became a generic term for all jet airliners.) flight with fare-paying passengers and inaugurated scheduled service from London to Johannesburg. The final Comet from BOAC's initial order, registered G-ALYZ, began flying in September 1952 and carried cargo along South American routes while simulating passenger schedules.

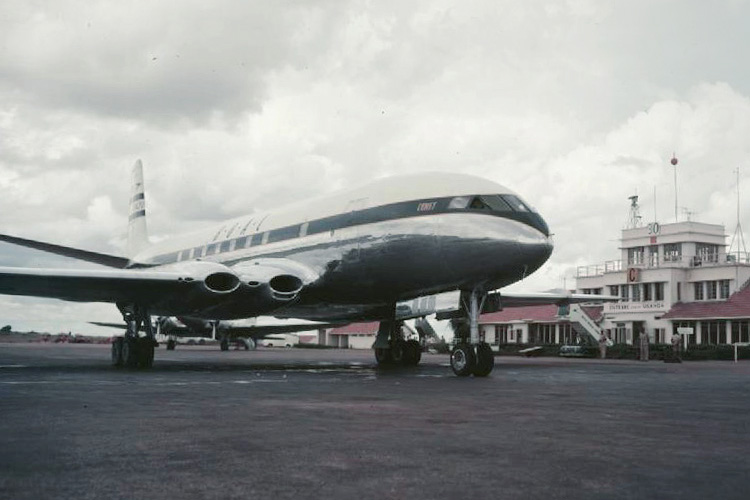
BOAC Comet 1 at Entebbe Airport, Uganda in 1952. This aircraft later crashed as BOAC Flight 115 in the same year.

Prince Philip returned from the Helsinki Olympic Games with G-ALYS on 4 August 1952. Queen Elizabeth, the Queen Mother, Elizabeth II and Princess Margaret were guests on a special flight of the Comet on 30 June 1953 hosted by Sir Geoffrey and Lady de Havilland. Flights on the Comet were about 55% faster than on advanced piston-engined aircraft such as the Douglas DC-6 (490 mph (790 km/h) vs 315 mph (507 km/h), respectively), and a faster rate of climb further cut flight times. In August 1953 BOAC scheduled the nine-stop London to Tokyo flights by Comet for 36 hours, compared to 86 hours and 35 minutes on its Argonaut (a DC-4 variant) piston airliner. (Pan Am's DC-6B was scheduled for 46 hours 45 minutes.) The five-stop flight from London to Johannesburg was scheduled for 21 hr 20 min.

In their first year, Comets carried 30,000 passengers. As the aircraft could be profitable with a load factor as low as 43 per cent, commercial success was expected. The Ghost engines allowed the Comet to fly above weather that competitors had to fly through. They ran smoothly and were less noisy than piston engines, had low maintenance costs and were fuel-efficient above 30,000 ft (9,100 m). (Note: Depending on weight and temperature, cruise fuel consumption was 6 to 10 kg (13 to 22 lb) per nautical mile (1.2 miles; 1.9 km), the higher figure being at the lower altitude needed at high weight.) In summer 1953, eight BOAC Comets left London each week: three to Johannesburg, two to Tokyo, two to Singapore and one to Colombo.

In 1953, the Comet appeared to have achieved success for de Havilland. Popular Mechanics wrote that Britain had a lead of three to five years on the rest of the world in jetliners. As well as the sales to BOAC, two French airlines, Union Aéromaritime de Transport and Air France, each acquired three Comet 1As, an upgraded variant with greater fuel capacity, for flights to West Africa and the Middle East. A slightly longer version of the Comet 1 with more powerful engines, the Comet 2, was being developed, and orders were placed by Air India, British Commonwealth Pacific Airlines, Japan Air Lines, Linea Aeropostal Venezolana, and Panair do Brasil. American carriers Capital Airlines, National Airlines, and Pan Am placed orders for the planned Comet 3, an even-larger, longer-range version for transatlantic operations. Qantas was interested in the Comet 1 but concluded that a version with more range and better takeoff performance was needed for the London to Canberra route.

=== Early hull losses ===
On 26 October 1952, the Comet suffered its first hull loss when BOAC Flight 115 departing Rome's Ciampino airport failed to become airborne and ran into rough ground at the end of the runway. Two passengers sustained minor injuries, but the aircraft, G-ALYZ, was a write-off. On 3 March 1953, a new Canadian Pacific Airlines Comet 1A, registered CF-CUN and named Empress of Hawaii, failed to become airborne while attempting a night takeoff from Karachi, Pakistan, on a delivery flight to Australia. The aircraft plunged into a dry drainage canal and collided with an embankment, killing all five crew and six passengers on board. The accident was the first fatal jetliner crash. In response, Canadian Pacific cancelled its remaining order for a second Comet 1A and never operated the type in commercial service.

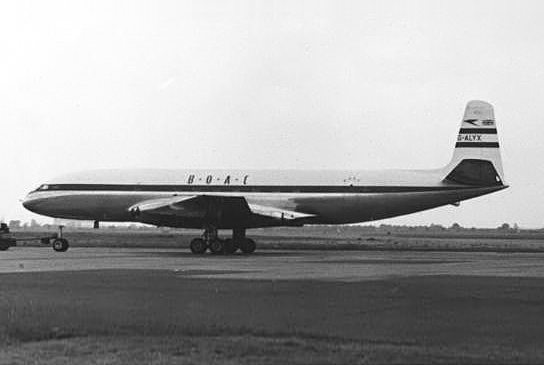
BOAC Comet 1 G-ALYX (Yoke X-Ray) at London Heathrow Airport in 1953 prior to a scheduled flight

Both early accidents were originally attributed to pilot error, as overrotation had led to a loss of lift from the leading edge of the aircraft's wings. It was later determined that the Comet's wing profile experienced a loss of lift at a high angle of attack, and its engine inlets also suffered a lack of pressure recovery in the same conditions. As a result, de Havilland re-profiled the wings' leading edge with a pronounced "droop", and wing fences were added to control spanwise flow. A fictionalised investigation into the Comet's takeoff accidents was the subject of the novel Cone of Silence (1959) by Arthur David Beaty, a former BOAC captain. Cone of Silence was made into a film of the same name in 1960, and Beaty also recounted the story of the Comet's takeoff accidents in a chapter of his non-fiction work, Strange Encounters: Mysteries of the Air (1984).

The Comet's second fatal accident occurred on 2 May 1953, when BOAC Flight 783, a Comet 1, registered G-ALYV, crashed in a severe thunderstorm six minutes after taking off from Calcutta-Dum Dum airport, India, killing all 43 on board. Witnesses observed the wingless Comet on fire plunging into the village of Jagalgori, leading investigators to suspect structural failure.

==== India Court of Inquiry ====
After the loss of G-ALYV, the Government of India convened a court of inquiry to examine the cause of the accident. (Note: The court acted under the provisions of Rule 75 of the Indian Aircraft Rules 1937.) Professor Natesan Srinivasan joined the inquiry as the main technical expert. A large portion of the aircraft was recovered and reassembled at Farnborough, during which the break-up was found to have begun with a left elevator spar failure in the horizontal stabilizer. The inquiry concluded that the aircraft had encountered extreme negative g-forces during takeoff; severe turbulence generated by adverse weather was determined to have induced down-loading, leading to the loss of the wings. Examination of the cockpit controls suggested that the pilot may have inadvertently over-stressed the aircraft when pulling out of a steep dive by over-manipulation of the fully powered flight controls. Investigators did not consider metal fatigue as a contributory cause.

The inquiry's recommendations revolved around the enforcement of stricter speed limits during turbulence, and two significant design changes also resulted: all Comets were equipped with weather radar and the "Q feel" system was introduced, which ensured that control column forces (invariably called stick forces) would be proportional to control loads. This artificial feel was the first of its kind to be introduced in any aircraft. The Comet 1 and 1A had been criticised for a lack of "feel" in their controls, and investigators suggested that this might have contributed to the pilot's alleged over-stressing of the aircraft; Comet chief test pilot John Cunningham contended that the jetliner flew smoothly and was highly responsive in a manner consistent with other de Havilland aircraft. (Note: Cunningham: "[the Comet] flew extremely smoothly and responded to the controls in the best way de Havilland aircraft usually did.")

=== Comet disasters of 1954 ===
Just over a year later, Rome's Ciampino airport, the site of the first Comet hull loss, was the origin of a more-disastrous Comet flight. On 10 January 1954, 20 minutes after taking off from Ciampino, the first production Comet, G-ALYP, broke up in mid-air while operating BOAC Flight 781 and crashed into the Mediterranean off the Italian island of Elba with the loss of all 35 on board. With no witnesses to the disaster and only partial radio transmissions as incomplete evidence, no obvious reason for the crash could be deduced. Engineers at de Havilland immediately recommended 60 modifications aimed at any possible design flaw, while the Abell Committee met to determine potential causes of the crash. (Note: The Abell Committee, named after chairman C. Abell, Deputy Operations Director (Engineering) of BOAC, consisted of representatives of the Allegation Review Board (A.R.B.), BOAC, and de Havilland.) BOAC also voluntarily grounded its Comet fleet pending investigation into the causes of the accident.

==== Abell Committee Court of Inquiry ====
Media attention centred on potential sabotage; other speculation ranged from clear-air turbulence to an explosion of vapour in an empty fuel tank. The Abell Committee focused on six potential aerodynamic and mechanical causes: control flutter (which had led to the loss of DH 108 prototypes), structural failure due to high loads or metal fatigue of the wing structure, failure of the powered flight controls, failure of the window panels leading to explosive decompression, or fire and other engine problems. The committee concluded that fire was the most likely cause of the problem, and changes were made to the aircraft to protect the engines and wings from damage that might lead to another fire.

The cost of solving the Comet mystery must be reckoned neither in money nor in manpower.

— Prime Minister Winston Churchill, 1954.

During the investigation, the Royal Navy conducted recovery operations. The first pieces of wreckage were discovered on 12 February 1954 and the search continued until September 1954, by which time 70 per cent by weight of the main structure, 80 per cent of the power section, and 50 per cent of the aircraft's systems and equipment had been recovered. The forensic reconstruction effort had just begun when the Abell Committee reported its findings. No apparent fault in the aircraft was found, (Note: On 4 April, Lord Brabazon wrote to the Minister of Transport, "Although no definite reason for the accident has been established, modifications are being embodied to cover every possibility that imagination has suggested as a likely cause of the disaster. When these modifications are completed and have been satisfactorily flight-tested, the Board sees no reason why passenger services should not be resumed.") and the British government decided against opening a further public inquiry into the accident. The prestigious nature of the Comet project, particularly for the British aerospace industry, and the financial impact of the aircraft's grounding on BOAC's operations both served to pressure the inquiry to end without further investigation. Comet flights resumed on 23 March 1954.

On 8 April 1954, Comet G-ALYY ("Yoke Yoke"), on charter to South African Airways, was on a leg from Rome to Cairo (of a longer route, SA Flight 201 from London to Johannesburg), when it crashed in the Mediterranean near Naples with the loss of all 21 passengers and crew on board. The Comet fleet was immediately grounded once again and a large investigation board was formed under the direction of the Royal Aircraft Establishment (RAE). Prime Minister Winston Churchill tasked the Royal Navy with helping to locate and retrieve the wreckage so that the cause of the accident could be determined. The Comet's Certificate of Airworthiness was revoked, and Comet 1 line production was suspended at the Hatfield factory while the BOAC fleet was permanently grounded, cocooned and stored.

==== Cohen Committee Court of Inquiry ====
On 19 October 1954, the Cohen Committee was established to examine the causes of the Comet crashes. Chaired by Lord Cohen, the committee tasked an investigation team led by Sir Arnold Hall, Director of the RAE at Farnborough, to perform a more-detailed investigation. Hall's team began considering fatigue as the most likely cause of both accidents and initiated further research into measurable strain on the aircraft's skin. With the recovery of large sections of G-ALYP from the Elba crash and BOAC's donation of an identical airframe, G-ALYU, for further examination, an extensive "water torture" test eventually provided conclusive results. This time, the entire fuselage was tested in a dedicated water tank that was built specifically at Farnborough to accommodate its full length.

In water-tank testing, engineers subjected G-ALYU to repeated repressurisation and over-pressurisation, and on 24 June 1954, after 3,057 flight cycles (1,221 actual and 1,836 simulated), G-ALYU burst open. Hall, Geoffrey de Havilland and Bishop were immediately called to the scene, where the water tank was drained to reveal that the fuselage had cracked at a bolt hole near the lower aft corner of the forward escape hatch cut out. The crack then spread longitudinally aft to the nearest bulkhead at frame station 18, which subsequently weakened the structure enough to cause a similar failure on the forward side of the hatch that split all the way to the bulkhead at frame station 13A. The skin thickness was discovered to be insufficient to resist fatigue at the counter-sunk fastener holes, and the fuselage frames did not have sufficient strength to prevent the crack from propagating, issues which were exacerbated by the gaps in the outer frame caps where stringers ran through. Although the fuselage failed after a number of cycles that represented three times the life of G-ALYP at the time of the accident, it was still much earlier than expected. A further test reproduced the same results. Based on these findings, Comet 1 structural failures could be expected at anywhere from 1,000 to 9,000 cycles. Before the Elba accident, G-ALYP had made 1,290 pressurised flights, while G-ALYY had made 900 pressurised flights before crashing. Dr P. B. Walker, Head of the Structures Department at the RAE, said he was not surprised by this, noting that the difference was about three to one, and previous experience with metal fatigue suggested a total range of nine to one between experiment and outcome in the field could result in failure.

The RAE also reconstructed about two-thirds of G-ALYP at Farnborough and found fatigue crack growth from a countersunk rivet hole near the starboard aft corner of the rear Automatic Direction Finder window, which had caused a catastrophic break-up of the aircraft in high-altitude flight. At the opposite port forward corner of the same window, a small crack resulting from manufacturing damage—that had been repaired at the time of construction—was also located along the failure, but the investigation found no evidence of metal fatigue at this point. Once the crack initiated the skin failed from the point of the ADF cut out and propagated downward and rearward, resulting in an explosive decompression.

Principal investigator Hall accepted the RAE's conclusion of design and construction flaws as the likely explanation for G-ALYU's structural failure after 3,060 pressurisation cycles. (Note: Hall: "In the light of known properties of the aluminium alloy D.T.D. 546 or 746 of which the skin was made and in accordance with the advice I received from my Assessors, I accept the conclusion of RAE that this is a sufficient explanation of the failure of the cabin skin of Yoke Uncle by fatigue after a small number, namely, 3,060 cycles of pressurisation.")

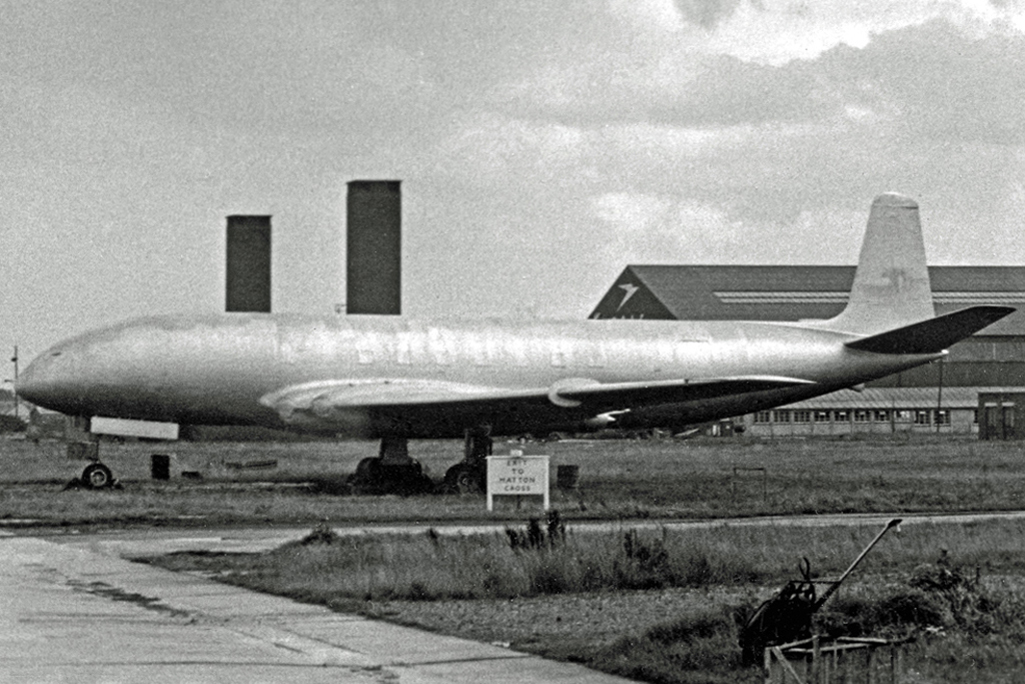
BOAC Comet 1 cocooned and stored in the maintenance area at London Heathrow Airport in September 1954

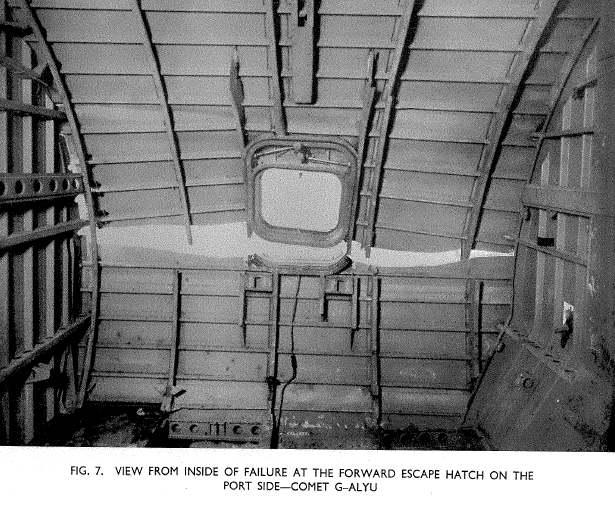
Image from the Cohen Inquiry Report showing fuselage failure under water pressure test of Comet 1 G-ALYU. Note intact escape hatch window frame

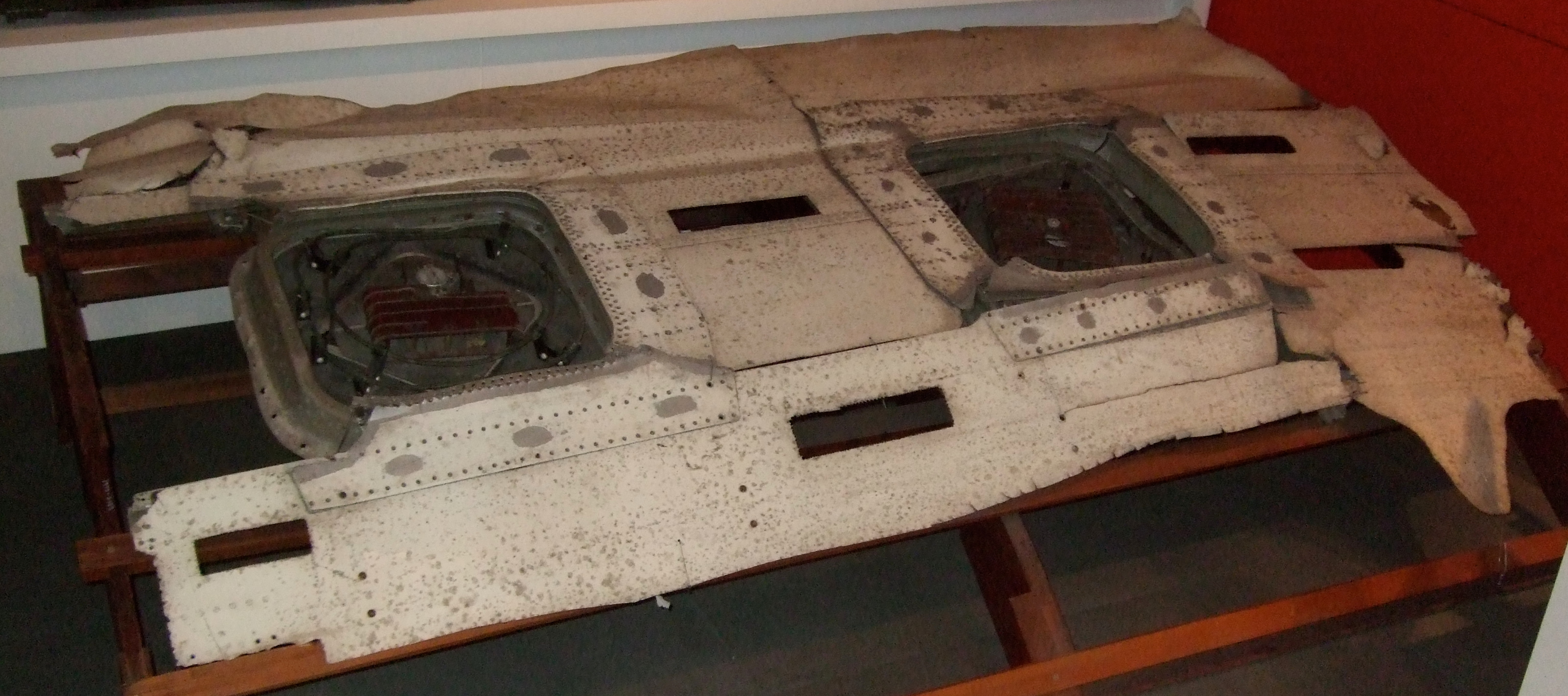
The ADF antenna penetration that failed on G-ALYP. On display at the Science Museum in London

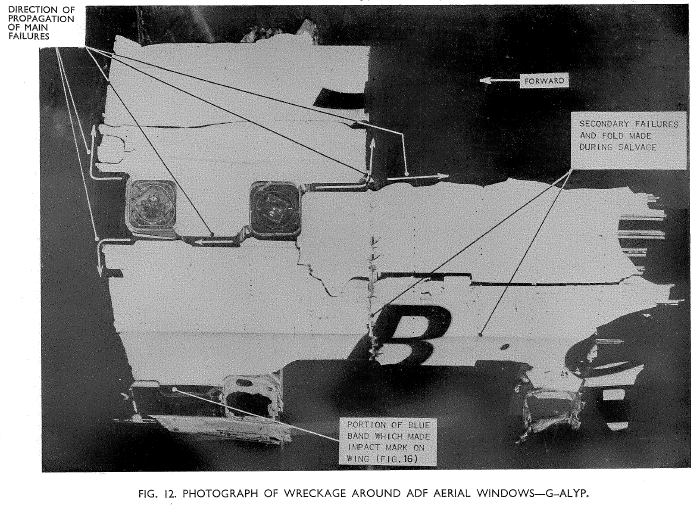
Image (Fig 12) from the Cohen Inquiry showing the location of the ADF antenna cut out "windows" in the roof above the cockpit of Comet 1 G-ALYP

==== Earlier structural indications ====
The issue of the lightness of Comet 1 construction (in order not to tax the relatively low-thrust de Havilland Ghost engines), had been noted by de Havilland test pilot John Wilson, while flying the prototype during a Farnborough flypast in 1949. On the flight, he was accompanied by Chris Beaumont, Chief Test Pilot of the de Havilland Engine Company who stood in the entrance to the cockpit behind the Flight Engineer. He stated "Every time we pulled 2 1/2-3G to go around the corner, Chris found that the floor on which he was standing, bulging up and there was a loud bang at that speed from the nose of the aircraft where the skin 'panted' (flexed), so when we heard this bang we knew without checking the airspeed indicator, that we were doing 340 knots. In later years we realised that these were the indications of how flimsy the structure really was."

==== Square window myths ====
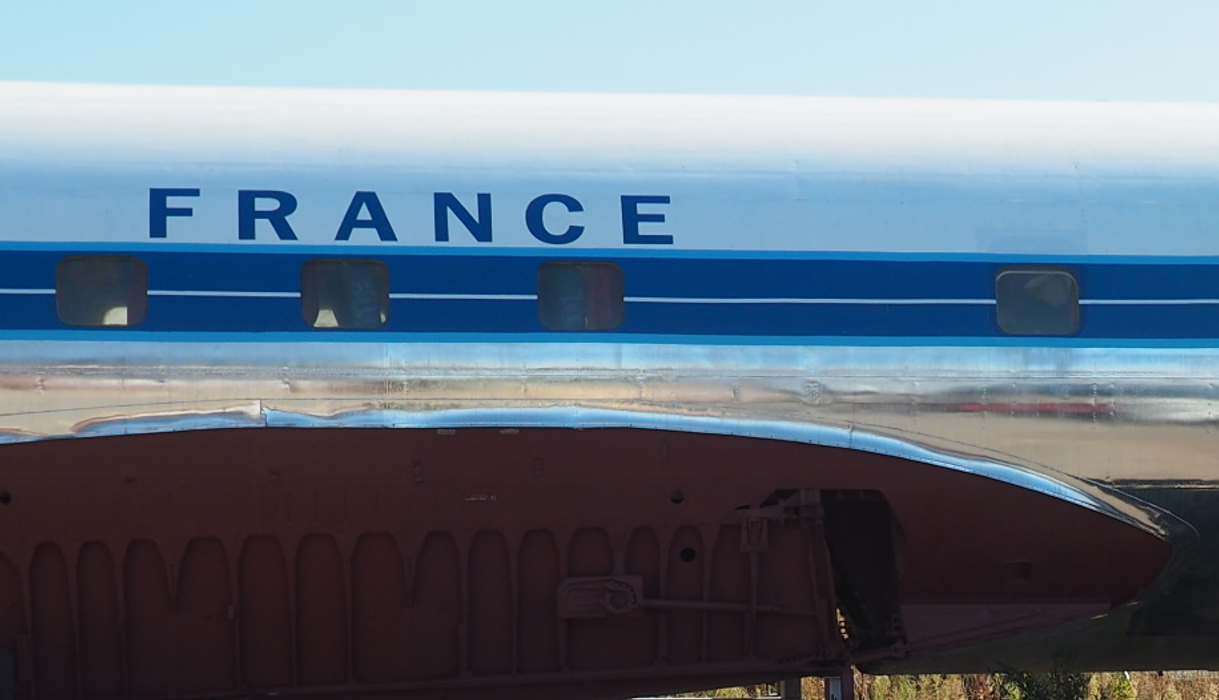
Surviving Comet 1 showing rectangular windows with rounded corners, not "square" as commonly described

Despite findings of the Cohen Inquiry, a number of myths have evolved around the cause of the Comet 1's accidents. Most commonly quoted are the 'square' passenger windows. While the report noted that stress around fuselage cut-outs, emergency exits and windows was found to be much higher than expected due to de Havilland's assumptions and testing methods the passenger windows' shape has been commonly misunderstood and cited as a cause of the fuselage failure. In fact the mention of "windows" in the Cohen report's conclusion refers specifically to the origin point of failure in the ADF Antenna cut-out "windows", located above the cockpit, not passenger windows. The shape of the passenger windows was not indicated in any failure mode detailed in the accident report and was not viewed as a contributing factor.

A number of other pressurized, piston-driven propeller airliners of the period, such as the Douglas DC-6 and DC-7, featured rectangular passenger windows with subtle rounded corners nearly identical to those on the early Comet 1 and 1A, yet experienced no such structural failures. Because these piston-propeller airliners operated at much lower cruising altitudes than jetliners, their required cabin pressure differential was significantly lower than that of the Comet 1, preventing the micro-rounded square window geometry from inducing catastrophic metal fatigue. Paul Withey, Professor of Casting at the University of Birmingham School of Metallurgy states in a video presentation delivered in 2019, analysing all available data that: "The fact that de Havilland put oval windows into later marks, is not because of any 'squareness' of the windows that caused failure." "de Havilland went to oval windows on the subsequent Marks because it was easier to Redux them in use adhesive – nothing to do with the stress concentration and it's purely to remove rivets from the structure."

Although there is a popular perception that early propeller airliners exclusively featured sharp square windows and that round windows only emerged after the Comet disasters with the introduction of the Comet 4, window geometries actually evolved through distinct design philosophies. Fully round or oval window designs had already existed well before the jet age on aircraft such as the DC-4, certain Lockheed Constellation variants, and the Boeing 377 Stratocruiser. Following the initial investigations and prior to the debut of the Comet 4, de Havilland itself adopted these circular geometries, incorporating oval passenger windows into the designs of the Comet 2 and Comet 3 variants, and even retrofitted surviving Comet 1A aircraft with oval windows under the upgraded Comet 1XB standard. The original choice of large passenger windows on the Comet 1 was a deliberate marketing effort to provide passengers with an expansive view. Subsequently, later generation jetliners like the Boeing 707 and Douglas DC-8 adopted the rectangular rounded-corner windows common on modern airliners; by employing a slightly larger corner radius than early designs, these windows maintained a wide, panoramic view while successfully mitigating stress concentration points.

Notably, the 1948 Vickers Viscount turboprop featured large panoramic oval windows, and the 1949 Avro Canada C102 Jetliner—the world's second jet airliner to fly—was designed with round windows from its inception. Similarly, the pioneering French Sud Aviation SE 210 Caravelle jetliner introduced a highly distinctive teardrop or rounded triangular window design aimed at optimizing downward passenger visibility while safely distributing structural stress.

==== Punch riveting ====
The fuselage skins on the Comet were fastened together using modified Erco automatic riveting machines, which punched holes through, dimpled, and then riveted sheet metal parts together. While some contemporary sources and discussions claim punch riveting negatively affected the Comet’s fatigue life, there is no evidence of punched rivet holes having an appreciably different fatigue strength than drilled rivet holes. Rather than punching, dimpling and knife-edge conditions due to countersinking are more likely to have affected the Comet. Without knowing the exact process used to dimple the skin, the effect thereof can’t be speculated, but fastener hole knife-edging is known to reduce the fatigue life of joints.

==== Response ====
In responding to the report de Havilland stated: "Now that the danger of high level fatigue in pressure cabins has been generally appreciated, de Havillands will take adequate measures to deal with this problem. To this end we propose to use thicker gauge materials in the pressure cabin area and to strengthen and redesign windows and cut outs and so lower the general stress to a level at which local stress concentrations either at rivets and bolt holes or as such may occur by reason of cracks caused accidentally during manufacture or subsequently, will not constitute a danger."

The Cohen inquiry closed on 24 November 1954, having "found that the basic design of the Comet was sound", and made no observations or recommendations regarding the shape of the windows. De Havilland nonetheless began a refit programme to strengthen the fuselage and wing structure, employing thicker-gauge skin and replacing the rectangular windows and panels with rounded versions, although this was not related to the erroneous "square" window claim, as can be seen by the fact that the fuselage escape hatch cut-outs (the source of the failure in test aircraft G-ALYU) retained their rectangular shape.

Following the Comet enquiry, aircraft were designed to "fail-safe" or safe-life standards, though several subsequent catastrophic fatigue failures, such as Aloha Airlines Flight 243 of April 28, 1988 have occurred.

=== Resumption of service ===
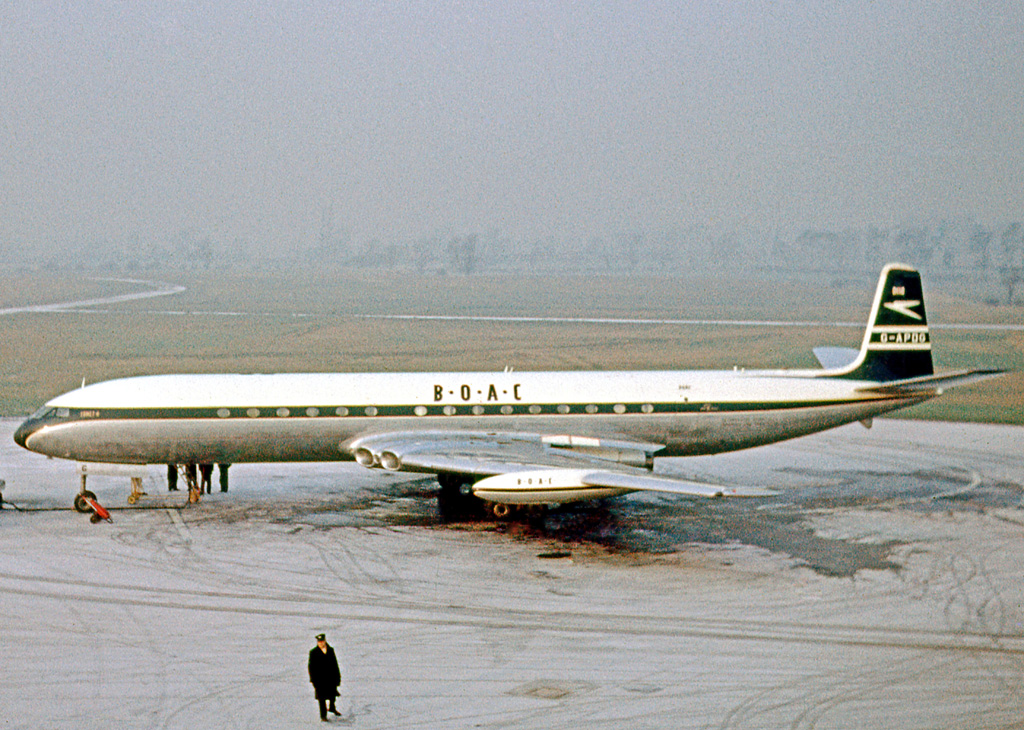
BOAC Comet 4 at Manchester Airport in 1963

With the discovery of the structural problems of the early series, all remaining Comets were withdrawn from service, while de Havilland launched a major effort to build a new version that would be both larger and stronger. All outstanding orders for the Comet 2 were cancelled by airline customers. All production Comet 2s were also modified with thicker gauge skin to better distribute loads and alleviate the fatigue problems (most of these served with the RAF as the Comet C2); a programme to produce a Comet 2 with more powerful Avons was delayed. The prototype Comet 3 first flew in July 1954 and was tested in an unpressurised state pending completion of the Cohen inquiry. Comet commercial flights would not resume until 1958.

Development flying and route proving with the Comet 3 allowed accelerated certification of what was destined to be the most successful variant of the type, the Comet 4. All airline customers for the Comet 3 subsequently cancelled their orders and switched to the Comet 4, which was based on the Comet 3 but with improved fuel capacity. BOAC ordered 19 Comet 4s in March 1955, and American operator Capital Airlines ordered 14 Comets in July 1956. Capital's order included 10 Comet 4As, a variant modified for short-range operations with a stretched fuselage and short wings, lacking the pinion (outboard wing) fuel tanks of the Comet 4. Financial problems and a takeover by United Airlines meant that Capital would never operate the Comet.

The Comet 4 first flew on 27 April 1958 and received its Certificate of Airworthiness on 24 September 1958; the first was delivered to BOAC the next day. The base price of a new Comet 4 was roughly £1.14 million (£30.92 million in 2024). The Comet 4 enabled BOAC to inaugurate the first regular jet-powered transatlantic services on 4 October 1958 between London and New York. On this service, the eastbound flight departing from New York reached London in a mere 6 hours and 12 minutes, becoming the first jetliner to fly non-stop across the Atlantic (With its swept-wing angle of only 20 degrees, unable to fully cope with the headwinds, still requiring a fuel stop at Gander International Airport, Newfoundland, on westward North Atlantic crossings). While BOAC gained publicity as the first to provide transatlantic jet service, by the end of the month rival Pan American World Airways was flying the Boeing 707 on the transatlantic New York-Paris route and in 1960 began flying Douglas DC-8's on its transatlantic routes as well. The American jets were larger, faster, longer-ranged and more cost-effective than the Comet, the sweep angle of the wings on both aircraft was better able to withstand the aerodynamic drag associated with high-speed flight than that of the Comet. After analysing the passenger capacity of the Boeing 707, BOAC's mind was completely made up, and in 1956 they signed an agreement with Boeing to finalize the purchase.

The Comet 4 was ordered by two other airlines: Aerolíneas Argentinas took delivery of six Comet 4s from 1959 to 1960, using them between Buenos Aires and Santiago, New York and Europe, and East African Airways received three new Comet 4s from 1960 to 1962 and operated them to the United Kingdom and to Kenya, Tanzania, and Uganda. The Comet 4A ordered by Capital Airlines was instead built for BEA as the Comet 4B, with a further fuselage stretch of 38 in (970 mm) and seating for 99 passengers. The first Comet 4B flew on 27 June 1959 and BEA began Tel Aviv to London-Heathrow services on 1 April 1960. Olympic Airways was the only other customer to order the type. The last Comet 4 variant, the Comet 4C, first flew on 31 October 1959 and entered service with Mexicana in 1960. The Comet 4C had the Comet 4B's longer fuselage and the longer wings and extra fuel tanks of the original Comet 4, which gave it a longer range than the 4B. Ordered by Kuwait Airways, Middle East Airlines, Misrair (later Egyptair), and Sudan Airways, it was the most popular Comet variant.

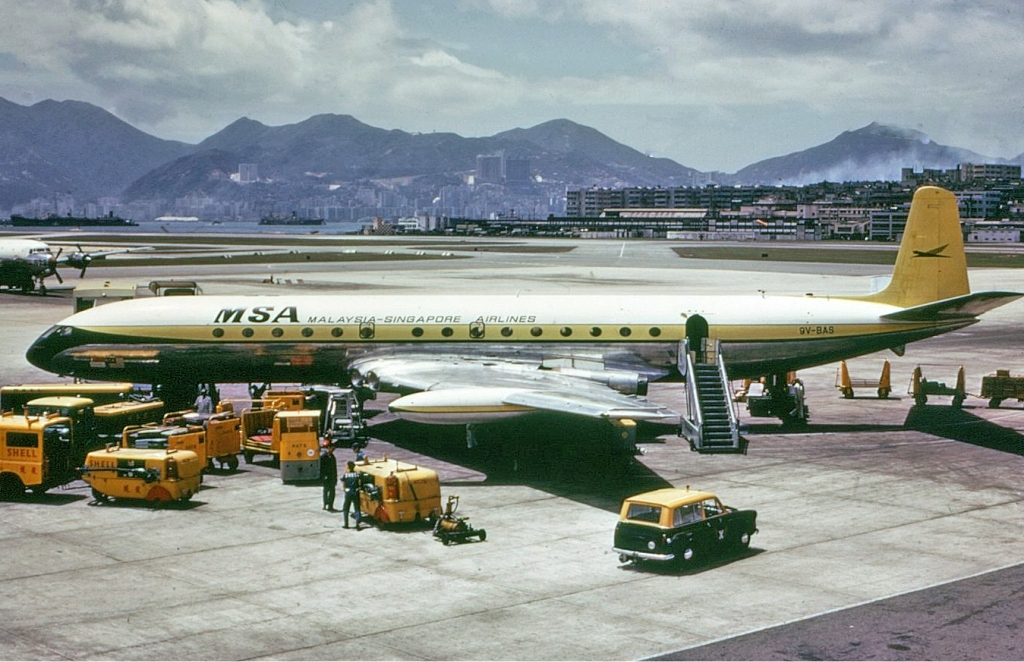
Malaysia-Singapore Airlines Comet 4 at Kai Tak Airport in 1966

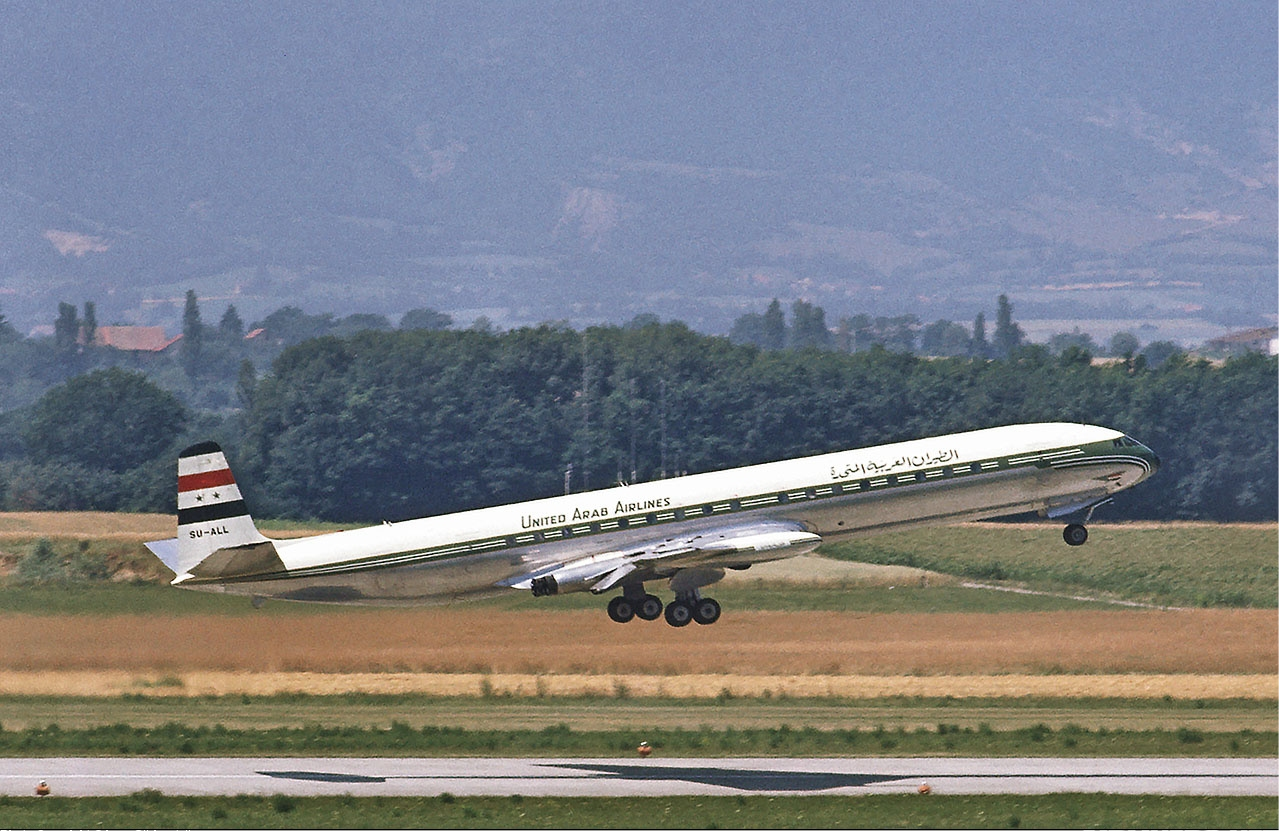
United Arab Airlines Comet 4C at Geneva Airport in 1968

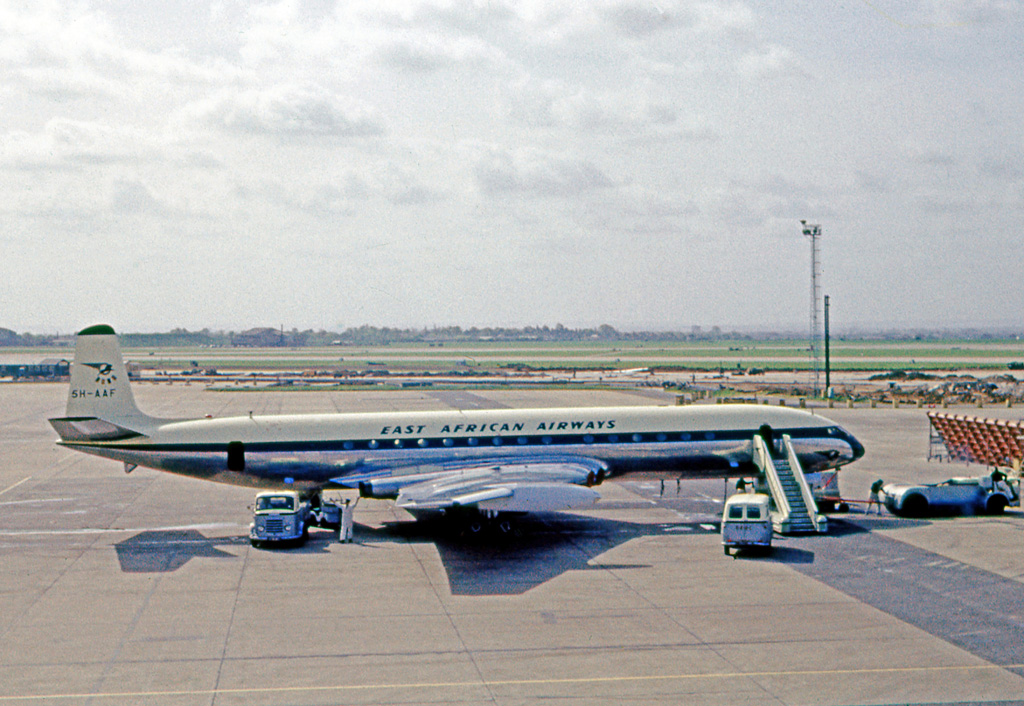
Comet 4 of East African Airways at London Heathrow in 1964

=== Later service ===
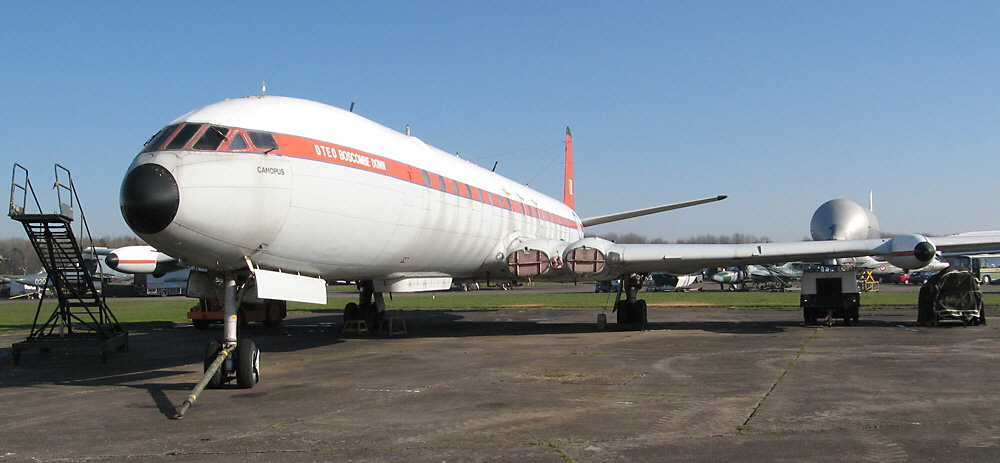
Comet 4C Canopus on display at the Bruntingthorpe Aerodrome in Leicestershire, England

In 1959, BOAC began shifting its Comets from transatlantic routes (Note: The Feb 1959 OAG shows eight transatlantic Comets a week out of London, plus 10 BOAC Britannias and 11 DC-7Cs. In April 1960, 13 Comets, 19 Britannias and 6 DC-7Cs. Comets quit flying the North Atlantic in October 1960 (but reportedly made a few flights in summer 1964).) and released the Comet to associate companies, making the Comet 4's ascendancy as a premier airliner brief. Besides the 707 and DC-8, the introduction of the Vickers VC10 allowed competing aircraft to assume the high-speed, long-range passenger service role pioneered by the Comet. In 1960, as part of a government-backed consolidation of the British aerospace industry, de Havilland itself was acquired by Hawker Siddeley, within which it became a wholly owned division.

In the 1960s, orders declined, a total of 76 Comet 4s being delivered from 1958 to 1964. In November 1965, BOAC retired its Comet 4s from revenue service; other operators continued commercial passenger flights with the Comet until 1981. Dan-Air played a significant role in the fleet's later history and, at one time, owned all 49 remaining airworthy civil Comets. On 14 March 1997 a Comet 4C serial XS235 and named Canopus, which had been acquired by the British Ministry of Technology and used for radio, radar and avionics trials, made the last documented production Comet flight.

== Legacy ==
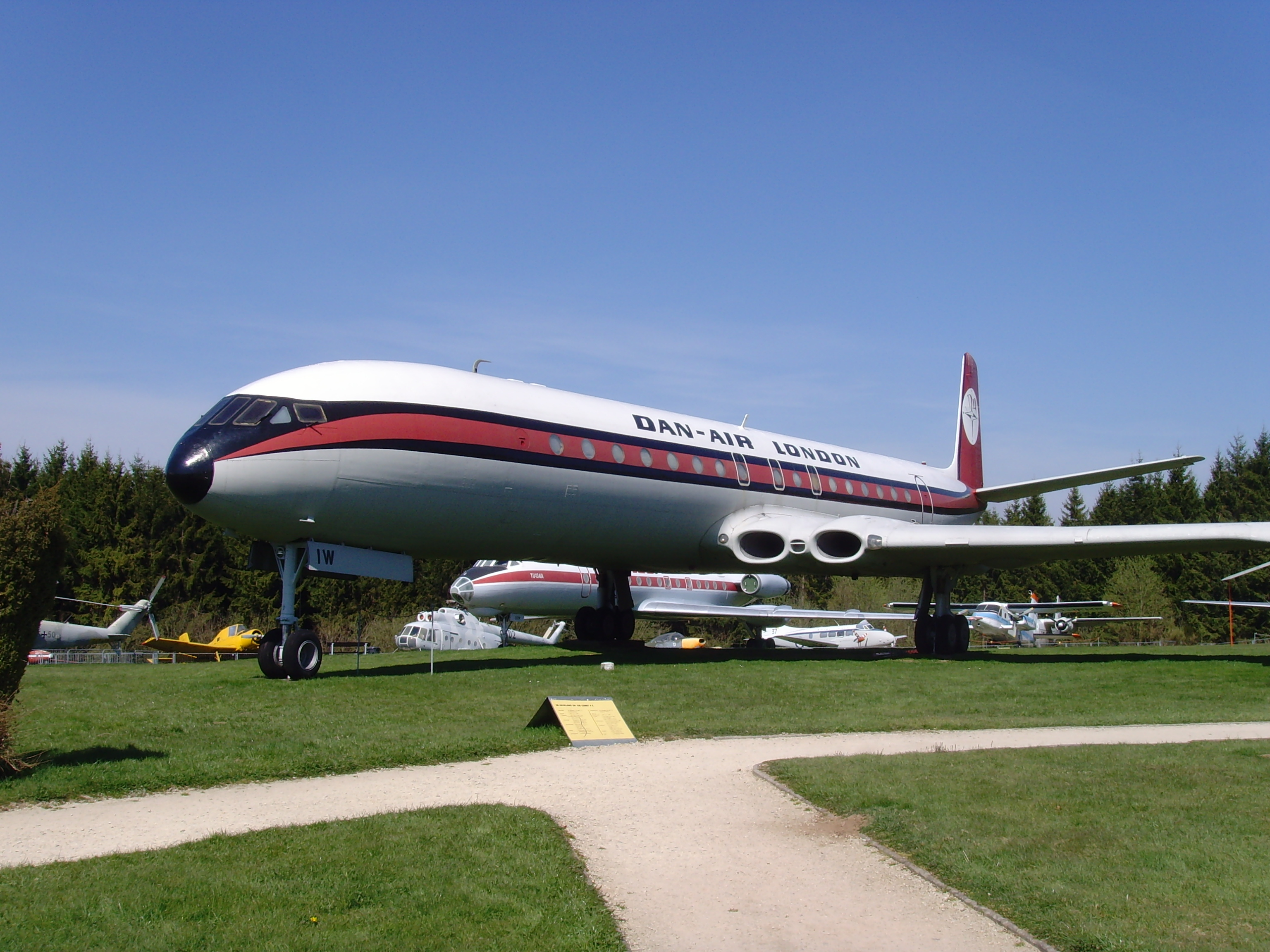
Dan-Air Comet 4C, G-BDIW exhibited at the Flugausstellung Hermeskeil in Germany

The Comet's legacy includes advances in aircraft design and in accident investigations. The inquiries into the accidents that plagued the Comet 1 established precedents in accident investigation; many of the deep-sea salvage and aircraft reconstruction techniques employed have remained in use within the aviation industry. In spite of the Comet being subjected to what was then the most rigorous testing of any contemporary airliner, pressurisation and the dynamic stresses involved were not thoroughly understood at the time of the aircraft's development, nor was the concept of metal fatigue. Though these lessons could be implemented on the drawing board for future aircraft, corrections could only be retroactively applied to the Comet.

According to de Havilland's chief test pilot John Cunningham, who had flown the prototype's first flight, representatives from American manufacturers such as Boeing and Douglas privately disclosed that if de Havilland had not experienced the Comet's pressurisation problems first, it would have happened to them. Cunningham likened the Comet to the later Concorde and added that he had assumed that the aircraft would change aviation, which it subsequently did. Aviation author Bill Withuhn concluded that the Comet had pushed "'the state-of-the-art' beyond its limits".

I don't think it is too much to say that the world changed from the moment the Comet's wheels left the ground.

— Tony Fairbrother, manager, upgraded Comet development.

Aeronautical-engineering firms were quick to respond to the Comet's commercial advantages and technical flaws alike; other aircraft manufacturers learned from, and profited by, the hard-earned lessons embodied by de Havilland's Comet. The Comet's buried engines were used on some other early jet airliners, such as the Tupolev Tu-104, but later aircraft, such as the Boeing 707 and Douglas DC-8, differed by employing podded engines held on pylons beneath the wings. Boeing stated that podded engines were selected for their passenger airliners because buried engines carried a higher risk of catastrophic wing failure in the event of engine fire. In response to the Comet tragedies, manufacturers also developed ways of pressurisation testing, often going so far as to explore rapid depressurisation; subsequent fuselage skins were of a greater thickness than the skin of the Comet.

== Variants ==
=== Comet 1 ===
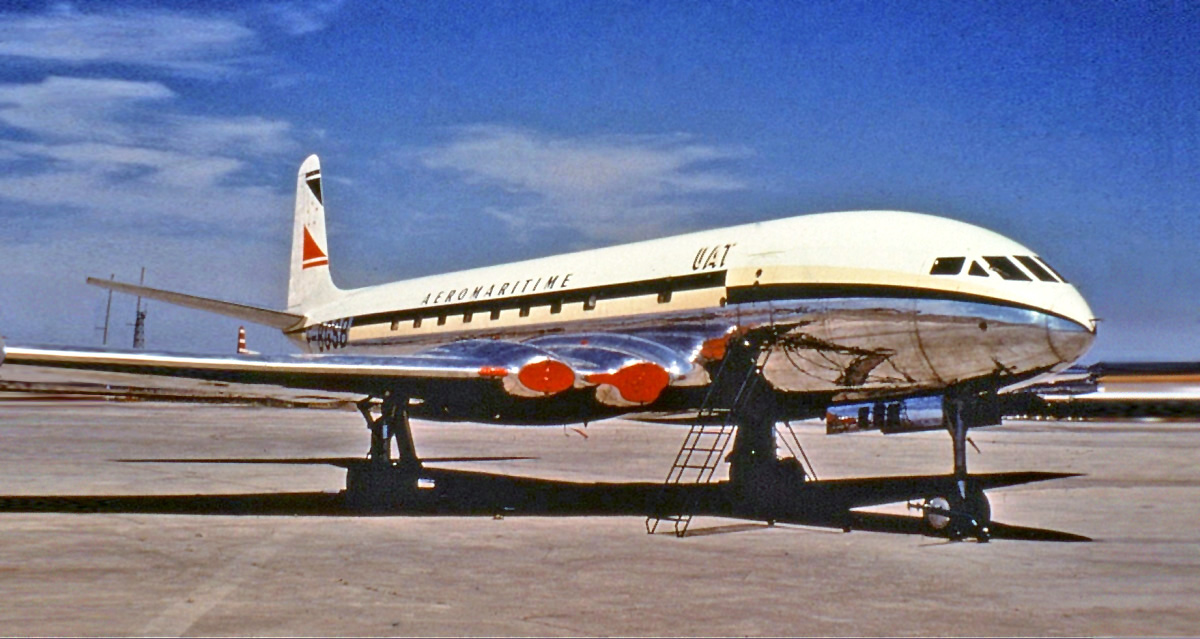
Union Aéromaritime de Transport Comet 1A at Le Bourget Airport in 1952

The Comet 1 was the first model produced, a total of 12 aircraft in service and test. Following closely the design features of the two prototypes, the only noticeable change was the adoption of four-wheel bogie main undercarriage units, replacing the single main wheels. Four Ghost 50 Mk 1 engines were fitted (later replaced by more powerful Ghost DGT3 series engines). The span was 115 ft (35 m), and overall length 93 ft (28 m); the maximum takeoff weight was over 105,000 lb (48,000 kg) and over 40 passengers could be carried.

- An updated Comet 1A was offered with higher-allowed weight, greater fuel capacity, and water-methanol injection; 10 were produced. In the wake of the 1954 disasters, all Comet 1s and 1As were brought back to Hatfield, placed in a protective cocoon and retained for testing. All were substantially damaged in stress testing or were scrapped entirely.
- Comet 1X: Two RCAF Comet 1As were rebuilt with heavier-gauge skins to a Comet 2 standard for the fuselage, and renamed Comet 1X.
- Comet 1XB: Four Comet 1As were upgraded to a 1XB standard with a reinforced fuselage structure and oval windows. Both 1X series were limited in number of pressurisation cycles.
- The DH 111 Comet Bomber, a nuclear bomb-carrying variant developed to Air Ministry specification B35/46, was submitted to the Air Ministry on 27 May 1948. It had been originally proposed in 1948 as the "PR Comet", a high-altitude photo reconnaissance adaptation of the Comet 1. The Ghost DGT3-powered airframe featured a narrowed fuselage, a bulbous nose with H2S Mk IX radar, and a four-crewmember pressurised cockpit under a large bubble canopy. Fuel tanks carrying 2,400 imperial gallons (11,000 L; 2,900 US gal) were added to attain a range of 3,350 miles (5,390 km). The proposed DH 111 received a negative evaluation from the Royal Aircraft Establishment over serious concerns regarding weapons storage; this, along with the redundant capability offered by the RAF's proposed V bomber trio, led de Havilland to abandon the project on 22 October 1948.

=== Comet 2 ===
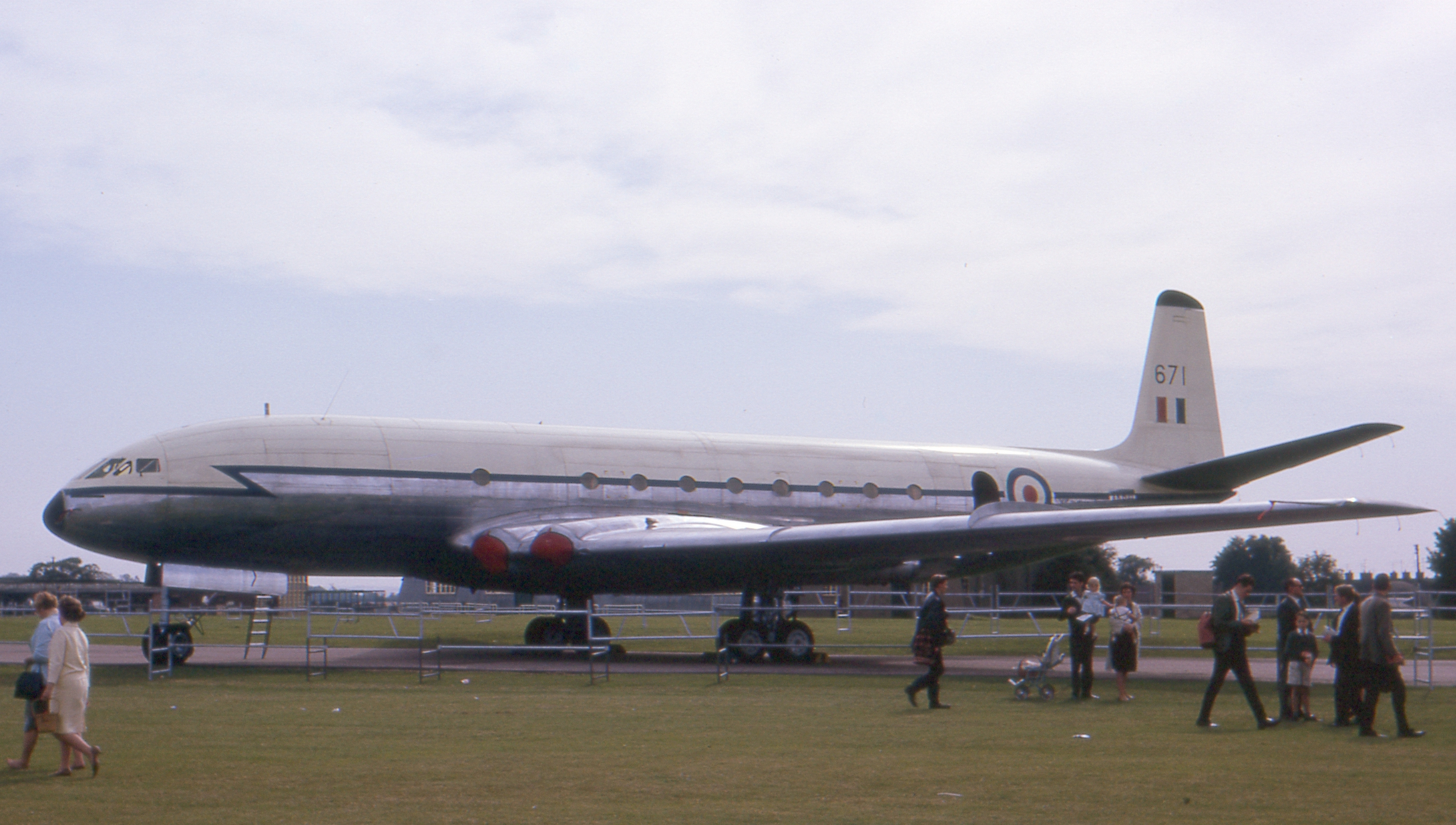
Comet C2, XK671 Aquila at RAF Waterbeach, fitted with revised round windows

The Comet 2 had a slightly larger wing, higher fuel capacity and more-powerful Rolls-Royce Avon engines, which all improved the aircraft's range and performance; its fuselage was 3 ft 1 in (0.94 m) longer than the Comet 1's. Design changes had been made to make the aircraft more suitable for transatlantic operations. Following the Comet 1 disasters, these models were rebuilt with heavier-gauge skin and rounded windows, and the Avon engines featuring larger air intakes and outward-curving jet tailpipes. (Note: Avon-powered Comets were distinguished by larger air intakes and curved tailpipes that reduced the thermal effect on the rear fuselage.) A total of 12 of the 44-seat Comet 2s were ordered by BOAC for the South Atlantic route. The first production aircraft (G-AMXA) flew on 27 August 1953. Although these aircraft performed well on test flights on the South Atlantic, their range was still not suitable for the North Atlantic. All but four Comet 2s were allocated to the RAF, deliveries beginning in 1955. Modifications to the interiors allowed the Comet 2s to be used in several roles. For VIP transport, the seating and accommodations were altered and provisions for carrying medical equipment including iron lungs were incorporated. Specialised signals intelligence and electronic surveillance capability was later added to some airframes.

- Comet 2X: Limited to a single Comet Mk 1 powered by four Rolls-Royce Avon 502 turbojet engines and used as a development aircraft for the Comet 2.
- Comet 2E: Two Comet 2 airliners were fitted with Avon 504s in the inner nacelles and Avon 524s in the outer ones. These aircraft were used by BOAC for proving flights during 1957–1958.
- Comet T2: The first two of 10 Comet 2s for the RAF were fitted out as crew trainers, the first aircraft (XK669) flying initially on 9 December 1955.
- Comet C2: Eight Comet 2s originally destined for the civil market were completed for the RAF and assigned to No. 216 Squadron.
- Comet 2R: Three Comet 2s were modified for use in radar and electronic systems development, initially assigned to No. 90 Group (later Signals Command) for the RAF. In service with No. 192 and No. 51 Squadrons, the 2R series was equipped to monitor Warsaw Pact signal traffic and operated in this role from 1958. (Note: The 2R ELINT series was operational until 1974, when replaced by the Nimrod R1, the last Comet derivative in RAF service.)

=== Comet 3 ===
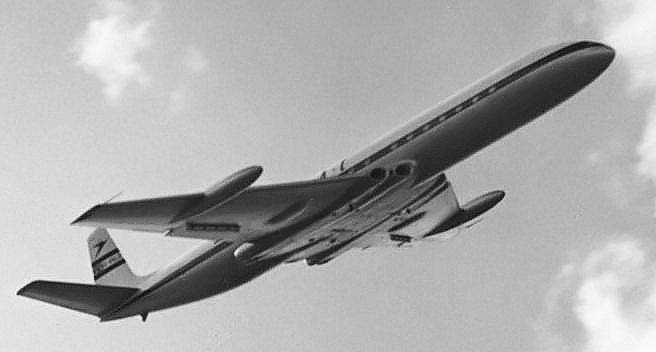
Comet 3 G-ANLO in BOAC markings at Farnborough Airshow in September 1954

The Comet 3, which flew for the first time on 19 July 1954, was a Comet 2 lengthened by 15 ft 5 in (4.70 m) and powered by Avon M502 engines developing 10,000 lbf (44 kN). The variant added wing pinion tanks, and offered greater capacity and range. The Comet 3 was destined to remain a development series since it did not incorporate the fuselage-strengthening modifications of the later series aircraft, and was not able to be fully pressurised. Only two Comet 3s began construction; G-ANLO, the only airworthy Comet 3, was demonstrated at the Farnborough SBAC Show in September 1954. The other Comet 3 airframe was not completed to production standard and was used primarily for ground-based structural and technology testing during development of the similarly sized Comet 4. Another nine Comet 3 airframes were not completed and their construction was abandoned at Hatfield.

In BOAC colours, G-ANLO was flown by John Cunningham in a marathon round-the-world promotional tour in December 1955. As a flying testbed, it was later modified with Avon RA29 engines fitted, as well as replacing the original long-span wings with reduced span wings as the Comet 3B and demonstrated in British European Airways (BEA) livery at the Farnborough Airshow in September 1958. Assigned in 1961 to the Blind Landing Experimental Unit (BLEU) at RAE Bedford, the final testbed role played by G–ANLO was in automatic landing system experiments. When retired in 1973, the airframe was used for foam-arrester trials before the fuselage was salvaged at BAE Woodford, to serve as the mock-up for the Nimrod.

=== Comet 4 ===
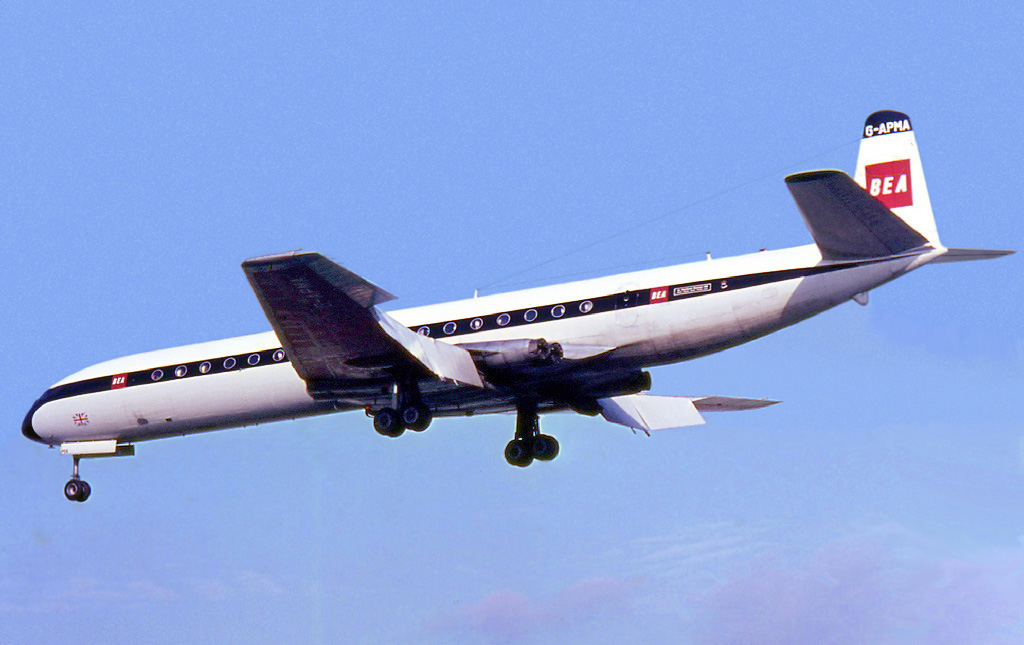
British European Airways Comet 4B, 1968

The Comet 4 was a further improvement on the stretched Comet 3 with even greater fuel capacity, The fuselage skin has been thickened considerably. The design had progressed significantly from the original Comet 1, growing by 18 ft 6 in (5.64 m) and typically seating 74 to 81 passengers compared to the Comet 1's 36 to 44 (119 passengers could be accommodated in a special charter seating package in the later 4C series). The Comet 4 was considered the definitive series, having a longer range, higher cruising speed and higher maximum takeoff weight. These improvements were possible largely because of Avon engines, with twice the thrust of the Comet 1's Ghosts. Deliveries to BOAC began on 30 September 1958 with two 48-seat aircraft, which were used to initiate the first scheduled transatlantic services.

- Comet 4B: Originally developed for Capital Airlines as the 4A, the 4B featured greater capacity through a 2m longer fuselage, and a shorter wingspan; 18 were produced.
- Comet 4C: This variant featured the Comet 4's wings and the 4B's longer fuselage; 28 were produced.

The last two Comet 4C fuselages were used to build prototypes of the Hawker Siddeley Nimrod maritime patrol aircraft. A Comet 4C (SA-R-7) was ordered by Saudi Arabian Airlines with an eventual disposition to the Saudi Royal Flight for the exclusive use of King Saud bin Abdul Aziz. Extensively modified at the factory, the aircraft included a VIP front cabin, a bed, special toilets with gold fittings and was distinguished by a green, gold and white colour scheme with polished wings and lower fuselage that was commissioned from aviation artist John Stroud. Following its first flight, the special order Comet 4C was described as "the world's first executive jet."

=== Comet 5 proposal ===
The Comet 5 was proposed as an improvement over previous models, including a wider and longer fuselage with five-abreast seating and a wing with greater sweep; still buried in the wing root were the Rolls-Royce Conway engines (very similar to the Vickers V-1000). Without support from the Ministry of Transport, the proposal languished as a hypothetical aircraft and was never realised. (Note: The MoT subsequently backed BOAC's order of Conway-powered Boeing 707s.)

=== Hawker Siddeley Nimrod ===
The last two Comet 4C aircraft produced were modified as prototypes (XV148 & XV147) to meet a British requirement for a maritime patrol aircraft for the Royal Air Force; initially named "Maritime Comet", the design was designated Type HS 801. This variant became the Hawker Siddeley Nimrod and production aircraft were built at the Hawker Siddeley factory at Woodford Aerodrome. Entering service in 1969, five Nimrod variants were produced. The final Nimrod aircraft were retired in June 2011.

== Operators ==
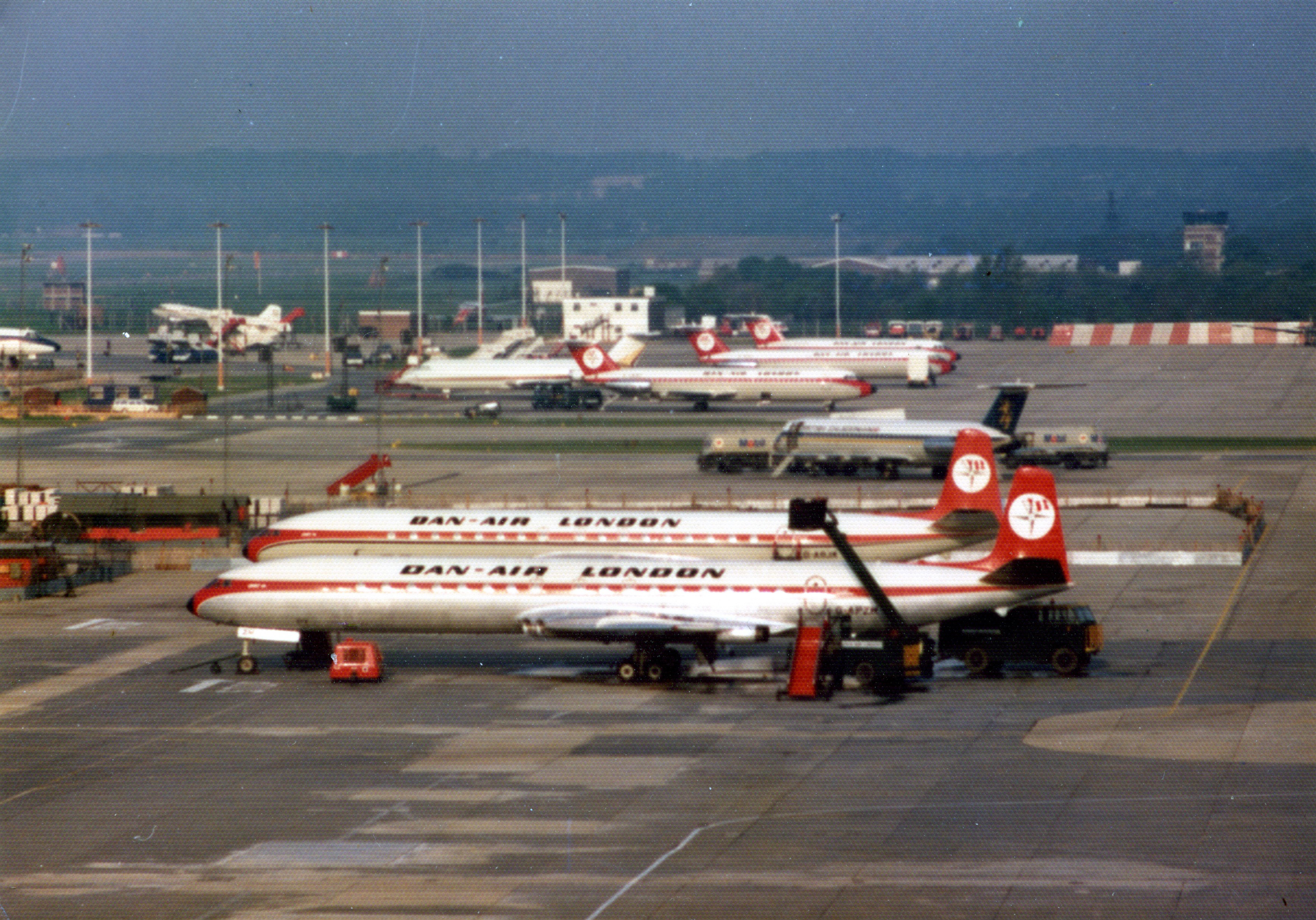
Dan-Air Comet 4s and BAC One-Elevens at London Gatwick Airport in 1976

The original operators of the early Comet 1 and the Comet 1A were BOAC, Union Aéromaritime de Transport and Air France. All early Comets were withdrawn from service for accident inquiries, during which orders from British Commonwealth Pacific Airlines, Japan Air Lines, Linea Aeropostal Venezolana, National Airlines, Pan American World Airways and Panair do Brasil were cancelled. When the redesigned Comet 4 entered service, it was flown by customers BOAC, Aerolíneas Argentinas, and East African Airways, while the Comet 4B variant was operated by customers BEA and Olympic Airways and the Comet 4C model was flown by customers Kuwait Airways, Mexicana, Middle East Airlines, Misrair Airlines and Sudan Airways.

Other operators used the Comet either through leasing arrangements or through second-hand acquisitions. BOAC's Comet 4s were leased out to Air Ceylon, Air India, AREA Ecuador, Central African Airways and Qantas; after 1965 they were sold to AREA Ecuador, Dan-Air, Mexicana, Malaysian Airways, and the Ministry of Defence. BEA's Comet 4Bs were chartered by Cyprus Airways, Malta Airways and Transportes Aéreos Portugueses. Channel Airways obtained five Comet 4Bs from BEA in 1970 for inclusive tour charters. Dan-Air bought all of the surviving flyable Comet 4s from the late 1960s into the 1970s; some were for spares reclamation, but most were operated on the carrier's inclusive-tour charters; a total of 48 Comets of all marks were acquired by the airline.

In military service, the United Kingdom's Royal Air Force was the largest operator, with 51 Squadron (1958–1975; Comet C2, 2R), 192 Squadron (1957–1958; Comet C2, 2R), 216 Squadron (1956–1975; Comet C2 and C4), and the Royal Aircraft Establishment using the aircraft. The Royal Canadian Air Force also operated Comet 1As (later retrofitted to 1XB) through its 412 Squadron from 1953 to 1963.

== Accidents and incidents ==
The Comet was involved in 25 hull-loss accidents, including 13 fatal crashes which resulted in 492 fatalities. Pilot error was blamed for the type's first fatal accident, which occurred during takeoff at Karachi, Pakistan, on 3 March 1953 and involved a Canadian Pacific Airlines Comet 1A. Three fatal Comet 1 crashes were due to structural problems, specifically British Overseas Airways Corporation flight 783 on 2 May 1953, British Overseas Airways Corporation flight 781 on 10 January 1954, and South African Airways flight 201 on 8 April 1954. These accidents led to the grounding of the entire Comet fleet. After design modifications were implemented, Comet services resumed on October 4, 1958, with Comet 4s.

Pilot error resulting in controlled flight into terrain was blamed for five fatal Comet 4 accidents: an Aerolíneas Argentinas crash near Asunción, Paraguay, on 27 August 1959, Aerolíneas Argentinas Flight 322 at Campinas near São Paulo, Brazil, on 23 November 1961, United Arab Airlines Flight 869 in Thailand's Khao Yai mountains on 19 July 1962, a Saudi Arabian Government crash in the Italian Alps on 20 March 1963, and United Arab Airlines Flight 844 in Tripoli, Libya, on 2 January 1971. The Dan-Air de Havilland Comet crash in Spain's Montseny range on 3 July 1970 was attributed to navigational errors by air traffic control and pilots. Other fatal Comet 4 accidents included a British European Airways crash in Ankara, Turkey, following instrument failure on 21 December 1961, a United Arab Airlines Flight 869 crash during inclement weather near Bombay, India, on 28 July 1963, and the terrorist bombing of Cyprus Airways Flight 284 off the Turkish coast on 12 October 1967.

Nine Comets, including Comet 1s operated by BOAC and Union Aeromaritime de Transport and Comet 4s flown by Aerolíneas Argentinas, Dan-Air, Malaysian Airlines and United Arab Airlines, were irreparably damaged during takeoff or landing accidents that were survived by all on board. A hangar fire damaged a No. 192 Squadron RAF Comet 2R beyond repair on 13 September 1957, and three Middle East Airlines Comet 4Cs were destroyed by Israeli troops at Beirut, Lebanon, on 28 December 1968.

== Aircraft on display ==
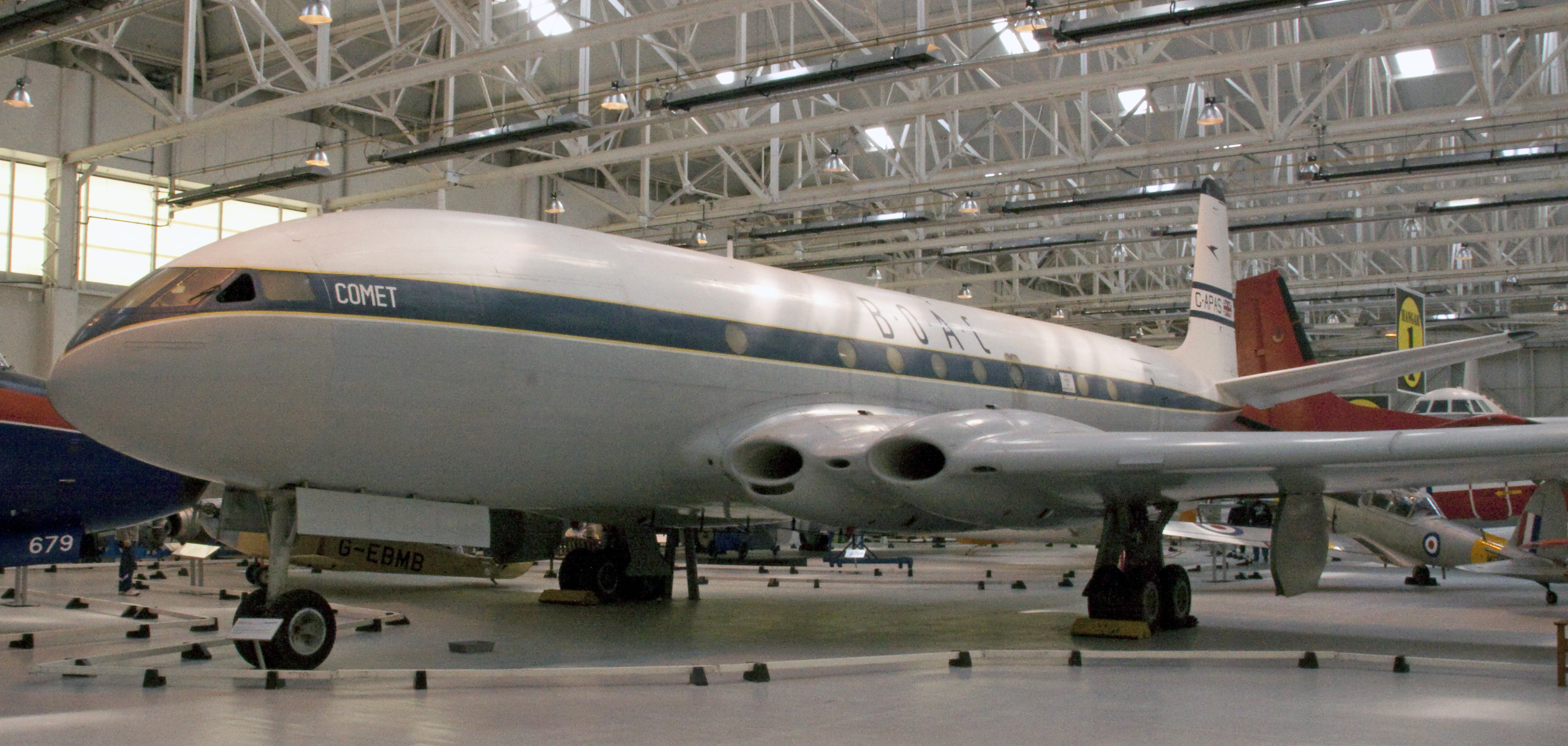
Comet 1 G-APAS at the Royal Air Force Museum Midlands in Shropshire

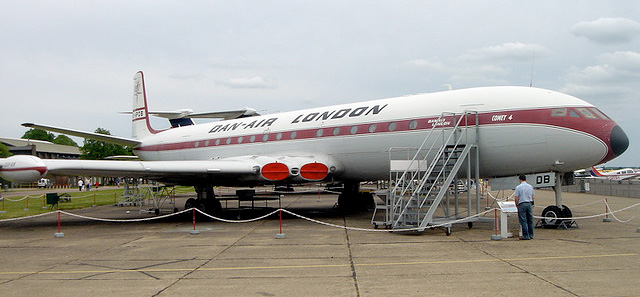
Comet 4 G-APDB outdoors at the Imperial War Museum Duxford in Cambridgeshire; this aircraft was later painted in BOAC's livery and placed inside the museum's AirSpace hall.

Since retirement, three early-generation Comet airframes have survived in museum collections. The only complete remaining Comet 1, a Comet 1XB with the registration G-APAS, the last Comet 1 built, is displayed at the Royal Air Force Museum Midlands. Though painted in BOAC colours, it never flew for the airline, having been first delivered to Air France and then to the Ministry of Supply after conversion to 1XB standard; this aircraft also served with the RAF as XM823.

The sole surviving Comet fuselage with the original square-shaped windows, part of a Comet 1A registered F-BGNX, has undergone restoration and is on display at the de Havilland Aircraft Museum near St Albans in Hertfordshire, England. A Comet C2 Sagittarius with serial XK699, later maintenance serial 7971M, was on display at the gate of RAF Lyneham in Wiltshire, England from 1987. In 2012, with the planned closure of RAF Lyneham, the aircraft was slated to be dismantled and shipped to the RAF Museum Cosford where it was to be re-assembled for display. The move was cancelled due to the level of corrosion and the majority of the airframe was scrapped in 2013, the cockpit section going to the Boscombe Down Aviation Collection at Old Sarum Airfield.

Six complete Comet 4s are housed in museum collections. The Imperial War Museum Duxford has a Comet 4 (G-APDB), originally in Dan-Air colours as part of its Flight Line Display, and later in BOAC livery at its AirSpace building. A Comet 4B (G-APYD) is stored in a facility at the Science Museum at Wroughton in Wiltshire, England. Comet 4Cs are exhibited at the Flugausstellung Peter Junior at Hermeskeil, Germany (G-BDIW), the Museum of Flight Restoration Center near Everett, Washington (N888WA), and the National Museum of Flight near Edinburgh, Scotland (G-BDIX).

The last Comet to fly, Comet 4C Canopus (XS235), is kept in running condition at Bruntingthorpe Aerodrome, where fast taxi-runs are regularly conducted. Since the 2000s, several parties have proposed restoring Canopus, which is maintained by a staff of volunteers, to airworthy, fully flight-capable condition. The Bruntingthorpe Aerodrome also displays a related Hawker Siddeley Nimrod MR2 aircraft.

== Specifications ==
Comet 4B 3-view schematic (front, side, and dorsal views)

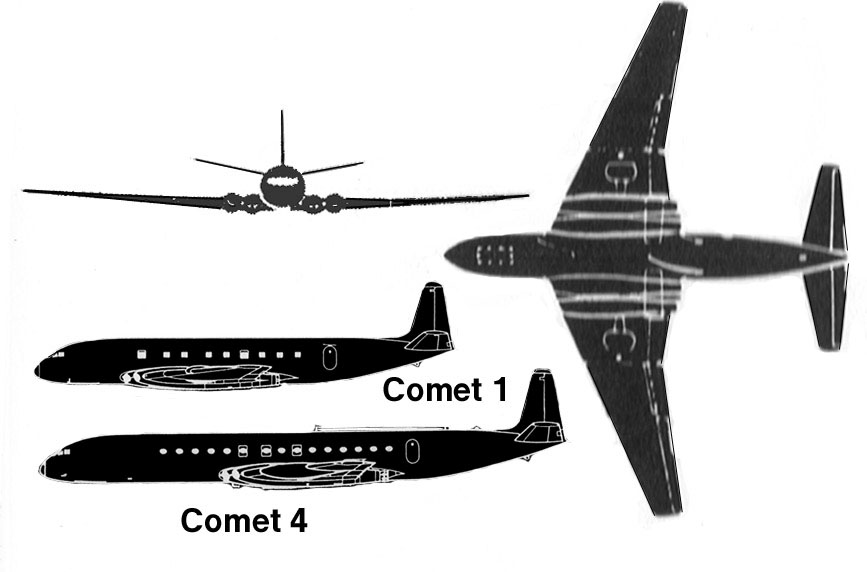
Comet 1 3-view in silhouette (note differences in Comet 4 insert, reproduced in same scale)

Variant	Comet 1	Comet 2	Comet 3	Comet 4
Cockpit crew	4 (2 pilots, flight engineer, and radio operator/navigator)			
Passengers	36–44		58–76	56–116
Length	93 ft (28 m)	96 ft 1 in (29.29 m)	111 ft 6 in (33.99 m)	
Tail height	29 ft 6 in (8.99 m)			
Wingspan	115 ft (35 m)			
Wing area	2,015 sq ft (187.2 m^{2})			2,121 sq ft (197.0 m^{2})
Aspect ratio	6.56			6.24
Airfoil	NACA 63A116 mod root, NACA 63A112 mod tip			
MTOW	110,000 lb (50,000 kg)	120,000 lb (54,000 kg)	150,000 lb (68,000 kg)	156,000 lb (71,000 kg)
Turbojets (x 4)	Halford H.2 Ghost 50	R-R Avon Mk 503/504	R-R Avon Mk 502/521	R-R Avon Mk 524
Unit thrust	5,000 lbf (22 kN)	7,000 lbf (31 kN)	10,000 lbf (44 kN)	10,500 lbf (47 kN)
Range	1,500 mi (1,300 nmi; 2,400 km)	2,600 mi (2,300 nmi; 4,200 km)	2,700 mi (2,300 nmi; 4,300 km)	3,225 mi (2,802 nmi; 5,190 km)
Cruising speed	400 kn; 460 mph; 740 km/h	430 kn; 490 mph; 790 km/h	450 kn; 520 mph; 840 km/h	
Cruise altitude	42,000 ft (13,000 m)		45,000 ft (14,000 m)	42,000 ft (13,000 m)

== See also ==
- Arnold Alexander Hall
- Seymour Collection, an aerophilately collection relating to the Comet in the British Library.

Related development

- Hawker Siddeley Nimrod
- Hawker Siddeley Nimrod R1
- British Aerospace Nimrod AEW3
- BAE Systems Nimrod MRA4

Aircraft of comparable role, configuration, and era

- Avro Canada C102 Jetliner
- Boeing 707
- Douglas DC-8
- Tupolev Tu-104
- Convair 880
- Convair 990
- Sud Aviation Caravelle

Related lists

- List of civil aircraft
- List of jet airliners
