= Natesan Srinivasan =

Indian engineer (born 1964)

Natesan Srinivasan (1919–1965) was a pioneer of aircraft design and aeronautics education in India. He made key contributions to aeronautics education and aviation development just as India emerged as an independent nation in 1947. He served as the Director of the Madras Institute of Technology from 1954 to 1959, where the future President of India,Abdul Kalam helped set up the vision for national aviation development in India. At the time of his untimely death, he was the project director for the AVRO project in Kanpur, India.

== Early life ==
Natesan Srinivasan was born to a Tamil family hailing from Komal village of Madras Province in 1919. As a family with very limited means, they were unable to support his education beyond high school. His sister's family, who were well aware of his keen intellect, took the initiative to support him through college.

== Education ==
He completed his bachelor's degree in physics at Saint Joseph's College, Tiruchirappalli, then affiliated with the University of Madras while staying with his sister's family in their small house in Tiruchirappalli. He graduated in 1938 and received the Tata scholarship to continue graduate studies in electrical engineering at the Indian Institute of Science in Bangalore.

During his graduate studies, he was hired in 1941 at Hindustan Aircraft Limited, which at the time became a center for overhaul of American aircraft during World War II. He worked there as an inspector on modification work on B-24 and B-17 aircraft and decided to pursue graduate studies in aeronautics. He received a competitive scholarship at the California Institute of Technology, which was at the forefront of aeronautics research at the time. However, with the war raging, his departure was delayed until 1944. He received a master's degree in aeronautical engineering in 1946 and obtained his professional degree of Aeronautical Engineer after writing a thesis on transonic flow.

In an interview with a Pasadena newspaper, he stated, "The people of Pasadena have been most kind, and exemplify the features of American life - the spirit of individuality and goodwill, the spirit of scientific inquiry and thinking and the will to survive in the future." Just as he finished his studies at Caltech, Satish Dhawan whose visionary leadership and research led to the indigenous development of the Indian space programme, was starting his graduate studies at Caltech.

== Career ==
After completing his studies in the United States, he returned to an independent India and joined Hindustan Aircraft Limited, where he worked in the design department until 1954. In 1953, his expertise was sought in investigating the crash of a British Overseas Aircraft Corporation Comet aircraft, which had crashed in a severe thundersquall six minutes after taking off from Calcutta-Dum Dum airport (now Netaji Subhas Chandra Bose International Airport). In his report, he suggested that the elevator control system in the Comet operated with booster power with no feedback arrangement for pilot feel, and this may have contributed to the pilot over-controlling the aircraft. From this inquiry, two significant design changes resulted: all Comets were equipped with weather radar, and the "Q feel" system was introduced, which ensured that control column forces (invariably called stick forces) would be proportional to control loads. This artificial feel was the first of its kind to be introduced in any aircraft.

In 1954, he was offered the position as Director of the Madras Institute of Technology, the first engineering-focused institute in India, and he was instrumental in building up the Faculty of Aeronautical Engineering. He had a keen interest in student welfare, and established the M.I.T. Athenaeum, a student organisation for extra-curricular activities. His contributions to aeronautics education at M.I.T. were legendary, and it was during his tenure as director when the future president of India, Abdul Kalam, studied at the institute. President Kalam recollects an experience in his design class taught by Professor Srinivasan in his book. Professor Srinivasan had rejected his design and asked him to submit a new one within three days - an impossible deadline. Kalam recalls toiling over the project and was delighted when Professor Srinivasan was pleased with his revised project. In his memoir, President Kalam says, "That day I learnt two lessons: a teacher who has his or her student's progress in mind is the best possible friend, because the teacher knows how to make sure that you excel. And second, there is no such thing as an impossible deadline. I have worked on many tough assignments, some of which had the country's top leaders watching over my work, but the assurance I gained in my capabilities at MIT thanks to Professor Srinivasan helped me later in life too."

During his tenure at the institute, Srinivasan developed a brain tumor. He left his position at the Madras Institute of Technology in 1959 and later joined the AVRO project in Kanpur, India, where he worked until February 1965, when he died at the age of 46.
