= Tony Fairbrother =

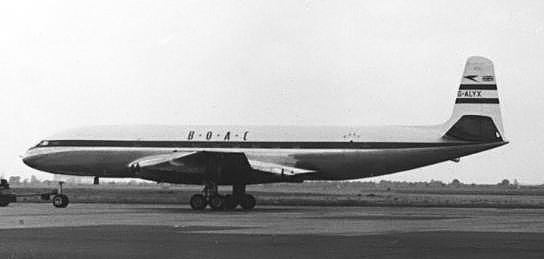
A de Havilland DH.106 Comet 1 jet airliner in 1953.

Anthony James Fairbrother (4 May 1926, Coventry – 7 December 2004) was an English engineer who was the flight-test engineer on the maiden flight of the de Havilland DH.106 Comet 1, the world's first jet airliner, in 1949.

Tony Fairbrother was educated at Bablake School in Coventry, Melton Mowbray Grammar School, and the de Havilland Aeronautical Technical School.

After working in the de Havilland design and aerodynamics departments, Fairbrother joined the company's new flight test department in 1948. On 27 July 1949, the Comet 1 made its historic 31-minute maiden flight. On board were the de Havilland chief test pilot, John Cunningham, co-pilot John Wilson, and flight test observer Tony Fairbrother. Fairbrother was quoted as commenting that: "The Comet must have been one of the all-time technical achievements. I don't think it is too much to say that the world changed from the moment its wheels left the ground."

Fairbrother was head of the de Havilland flight development team based at Hatfield, Hertfordshire, for around 30 years. He managed the development, flight testing, and certification of more than 15 new types of both civil and military aircraft. During the early 1950s he managed the development of the Comet 1, Comet 2 and Comet 3, de Havilland Sea Vixen, Dove 8, Heron 1 and 2, and the Vampire night fighter. Fairbrother played an important part in recovering from the Comet disasters of 1954 due to structural fatigue. He managed the flight testing of the modified Comet 3, and Comet 4, 4B and 4C.

Tony Fairbrother was married with two sons.
