= BOAC Flight 115 =

1952 aviation accident in Italy

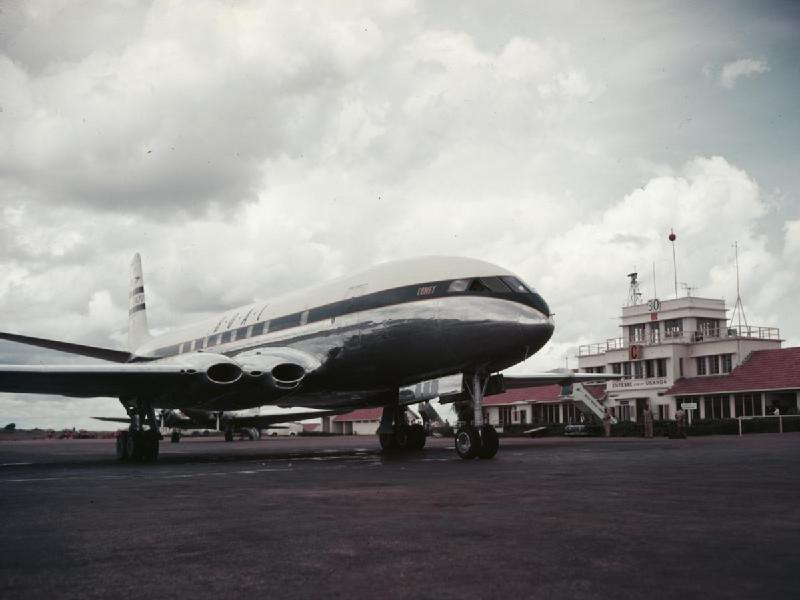
- G-ALYZ, the aircraft involved in the accident

Accident
- Date: 26 October 1952
- Summary: Pilot error, runway excursion on takeoff
- Site: Rome Ciampino Airport, Rome, Italy

Aircraft
- Aircraft type: de Havilland Comet 1A
- Operator: British Overseas Airways Corporation
- Call sign: SPEEDBIRD 115
- Registration: G-ALYZ
- Flight origin: Heathrow Airport, United Kingdom
- 1st stopover: Rome Ciampino Airport, Rome, Italy
- Last stopover: Cairo International Airport, Cairo, Egypt
- Destination: Palmietfontein Airport, Johannesburg, South Africa
- Occupants: 43
- Passengers: 35
- Crew: 8
- Fatalities: 0
- Injuries: 2
- Survivors: 43

BOAC Flight 115 was a scheduled passenger flight from Heathrow Airport to Palmietfontein Airport in Johannesburg with several intermediate stops. On 26 October 1952, Flight 115 ran off the runway on takeoff at Ciampino Airport in Rome but all 43 on board survived. It was the first hull-loss of a Comet.

== Background ==
In 1949 the de Havilland Comet was the first passenger jet to fly and revenue service began in May of 1952, 6 months before the accident. G-ALYZ was a Comet 1A and the fifth Comet produced for the British Overseas Airways Corporation (BOAC). It was en route from London to Johannesburg with stops in Rome and Cairo. 35 people boarded the plane heading to Cairo with 2 captains, 1 engineer and 1 navigator with 4 cabin crew.

== Crash ==
Flight 115 was operating a regular passenger service from London to Johannesburg. At Rome airport the aircraft taxied to Runway 16, and then the aircraft began takeoff for the second leg to Cairo. The pilot rotated the nose at a speed of 75-80 knots and then at a speed of 112 knots he pulled back further on the control column to lift the airplane into the air. As the airplane reached an appropriate height in the air the captain called for the landing gear to be raised but the left wing suddenly dropped however control was quickly regained. The aircraft began to shake and the pilot thought the aircraft was beginning to stall, but despite two corrective actions of the control column, the shaking continued. Before the first officer had had time to raise the landing gear, the aircraft came down on the landing gear wheels and bounced. The pilot then realized that the aircraft's speed was not increasing and thought it was caused by loss of engine thrust. He was also aware that the aircraft was quickly approaching the end of the runway so the pilot abandoned the takeoff. The aircraft was moving too fast to stop on the runway and when it overran the end of the runway the aircraft struck an earthen mound and slid for 270 yd (810 ft), breaking off the landing gear and suffering severe damage. Despite a large fuel spill, no fire resulted. The only injuries reported were one passenger with a cut finger and one with slight shock.

== Cause ==
The cause of the crash was pilot input of an excessive nose-up command during the takeoff which lead to a stall. The after-accident report noted that the manufacturer's handbook included a caution in its description of the take off procedure, saying, "... care should be taken not to overdo [the nose up] with a consequent poor acceleration."
