= BOAC Flight 783 =

1953 aviation accident in India

Coordinates: 22.788577°N 88.082081°E

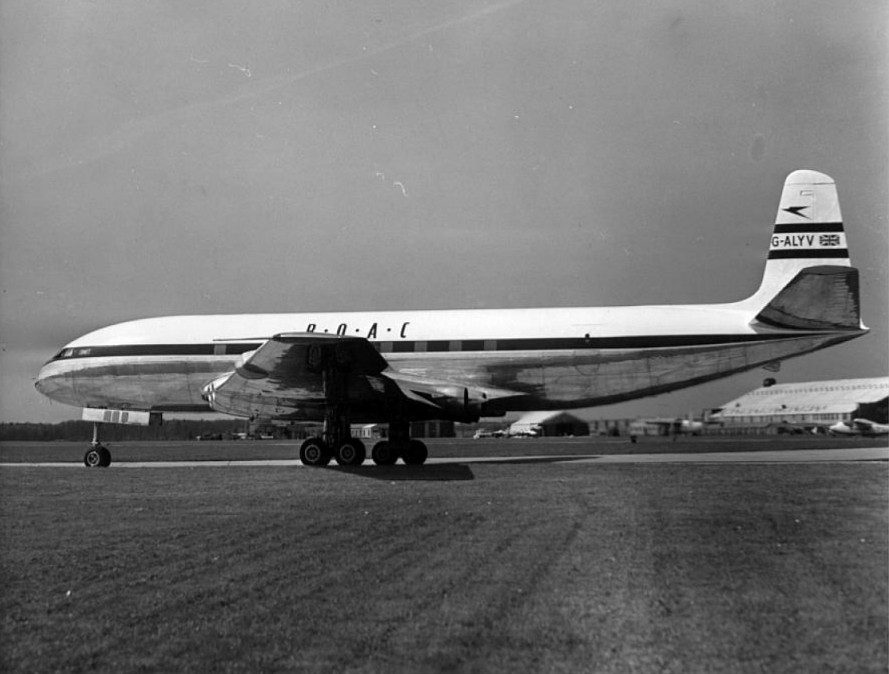
- G-ALYV, the aircraft involved in the accident

Accident
- Date: 2 May 1953
- Summary: Crashed following structural failure in severe turbulence
- Site: Jagalgori, near Calcutta, India

Aircraft
- Aircraft type: de Havilland DH.106 Comet
- Operator: British Overseas Airways Corporation
- IATA flight No.: BA783
- ICAO flight No.: BOA783
- Call sign: SPEEDBIRD 783
- Registration: G-ALYV
- Flight origin: Kallang Airport, Singapore
- 1st stopover: Dum Dum Airport, Calcutta, India
- 2nd stopover: Safdarjung Airport, India
- Destination: London, England
- Occupants: 43
- Passengers: 37
- Crew: 6
- Fatalities: 43
- Survivors: 0

On 2 May 1953, BOAC Flight 783, a de Havilland Comet jetliner registered G-ALYV and operated by British Overseas Airways Corporation, broke up mid-air and crashed after encountering a severe squall, shortly after taking off from Calcutta (now Kolkata), India. All 43 passengers and crew on board were killed.

The crash was followed in less than a year by two more fatal accidents involving structural failure of Comet aircraft: BOAC Flight 781 and South African Airways Flight 201, after which the entire fleet was grounded until extensive redesign of the type was carried out, leading to the development of the Comet 2 version.

== History of the flight ==
Flight 783 had originated in Singapore and was a service to London. After a scheduled stopover at Calcutta's Dum Dum Airport (now Netaji Subhas Chandra Bose International Airport), the aircraft departed on 2 May at 16:29 local time (10:59 GMT) on its next segment to Delhi.

Six minutes after takeoff, while the jet was climbing to 7,500 ft (2,300 m), radio contact with air traffic control was lost. At around the same time, witnesses on the ground near the village of Jagalgori, around 25 miles (40 km) north-west of Calcutta, observed the aircraft coming down in flames. Severe rain and thunderstorms were present in the area.

The wreckage of G-ALYV was later found strewn along a 5-mile (8 km) track, with the main parts still on fire. There were no survivors.

== Victims ==
The 43 people on board were 6 crew members and 37 passengers. The official report states that there were, of the passengers: 31 British, three Americans, two Burmese, and one Filipino on board. Among the victims were Australian politician Trevor Oldham and his wife. In the report, the Oldhams are listed as British nationals.

== Investigation ==
The subsequent investigation found that, after encountering a squall, the aircraft "suffered structural failure in the air which caused fire." The probable cause of the failure was reported as "overstressing which resulted from either: severe gusts encountered in the thundersquall, or overcontrolling or loss of control by the pilot when flying through the thunderstorm."

The investigators also recommended "to consider if any modification to the structure of the Comet is necessary."
