= RFA Sea Salvor =

King Salvor class salvage vessel of the Royal Fleet Auxiliary

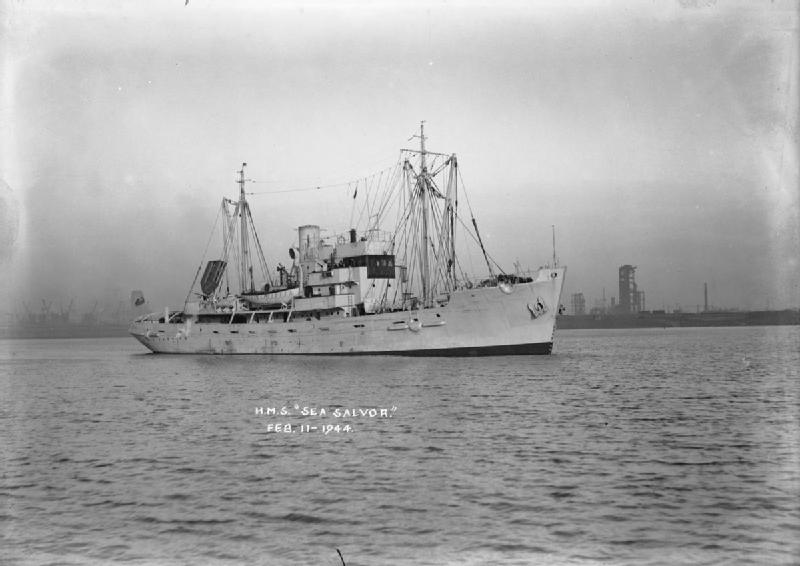

History

United Kingdom
- Name: Sea Salvor
- Operator: Risdon Beazley
- Ordered: 25 December 1941
- Builder: Goole Shipbuilding & Repair Co Ltd, Goole
- Yard number: 391
- Laid down: 9 August 1942
- Launched: 22 April 1943
- Commissioned: February 1944
- Decommissioned: April 1971
- Fate: Arrived Thos. W. Ward, Grays, Essex, for scrapping, 18 January 1973

General characteristics
- Class & type: King Salvor class salvage vessel
- Displacement: 1,780 long tons (1,809 t) full load
- Length: 218 ft (66 m)
- Beam: 39 ft 10 in (12.14 m)
- Draught: 15 ft 7 in (4.75 m)
- Propulsion: 2 × 3-cylinder triple expansion steam engines
- Speed: 12 knots (22 km/h; 14 mph)
- Complement: Between 52 and 72
- Armament: 4 × 20 mm AA guns (4×1)

RFA Sea Salvor (A503) was a salvage vessel of the post-war Royal Fleet Auxiliary. She also served as a support ship for Mine Counter Measures vessels.

Built by the Goole Shipbuilding & Repair Co. Ltd., Goole, the ship was launched on 22 April 1943, and commissioned in February 1944. Decommissioned in April 1971, the ship was laid up at HMNB Devonport, and arrived at Grays, Essex for scrapping on 18 January 1973.

== Service history ==
From February to May 1954 she recovered wreckage of the British Overseas Airways Corporation's de Havilland Comet G-ALYP "Yoke Peter" which crashed on 10 January 1954 after taking off from Rome, Italy. Sea Salvor deployed for service during "Operation Musketeer" – the Suez Crisis – in December 1956.

In April 1961 Sea Salvor was in the Persian Gulf. On 9 April she took the burning passenger and cargo ship Dara in tow, to try to beach her to prevent her from sinking. However, within 3 nautical miles (6 km) of the beach, Dara rolled over and sank.

In January 1968 Sea Salvor, together with the minesweepers Ashton, Crofton, Stubbington and Walkerton took part in relief efforts following the 1968 Belice earthquake that struck Sicily on 14–15 January.
