= Ball-bearing Run =

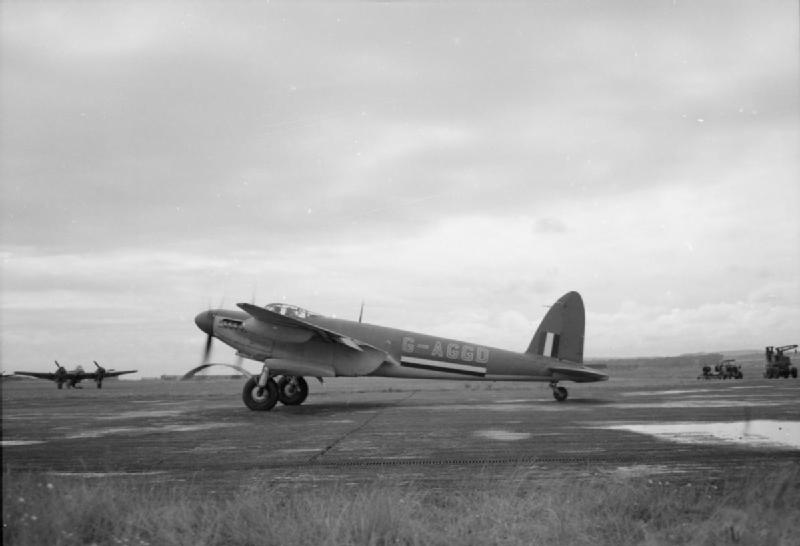
A de Havilland Mosquito in BOAC, civilian markings at Leuchars, Scotland

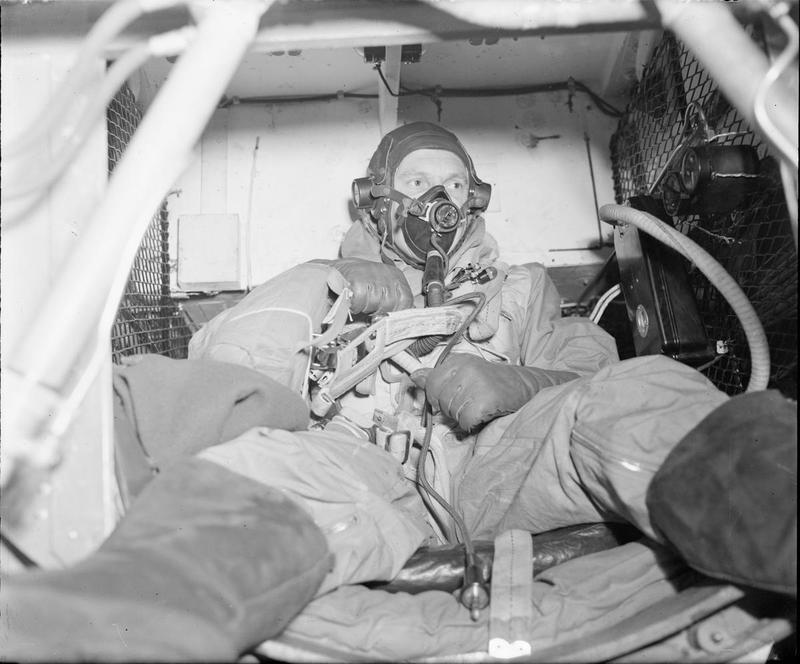
A single passenger in the bomb-bay of a BOAC Mosquito

Ball-bearing Run was the nickname of the war-time Stockholmsruten flight between Stockholm and Leuchars, Scotland between 1939 and 1945. After 1942 the flight was run by the Royal Norwegian Air Force, but for political reasons operated as an ordinary BOAC Flight, the unarmed aircraft having civilian registration and the Norwegian military crew wearing BOAC uniforms and carrying British passports. The Stockholmsruten was set up by the Norwegian Government, exiled in UK with the aim of transporting Norwegians having escaped from Nazi-occupied Norway. Several types of aircraft were used, but the backbone of Stockholmsruten was the Lockheed Lodestar.

Since the aircraft also carried ball bearings, of greatest importance to the British war industry, this is how the flight got its nickname in UK. From 1943, greater load-carrying capacity was achieved by the addition of Douglas Dakota aircraft, but during the short summer evenings when the route over occupied Norway would be too hazardous for these slow aircraft, de Havilland Mosquitos were employed instead, but could only carry a small payload.

The service also carried other passengers, one of the most notable being Danish physicist, Niels Bohr, who was flown from Sweden to Britain in a Mosquito in 1943, while in the same year, George Binney, the organiser of blockade-running operations was flown into Sweden in the same type. The Mosquito lacked any provision for passengers, who had to be carried in the aircraft's bomb bay, where they were only able to communicate with the pilot by pulling on a piece of string.

Between 1939 and 1945, 6,000 passengers, and 500,000 tons of freight, were transported by BOAC between Stockholm and Great Britain.

== See also ==
- Shetland bus
