= British Overseas Airways Corporation =

1939–1974 British state-owned airline

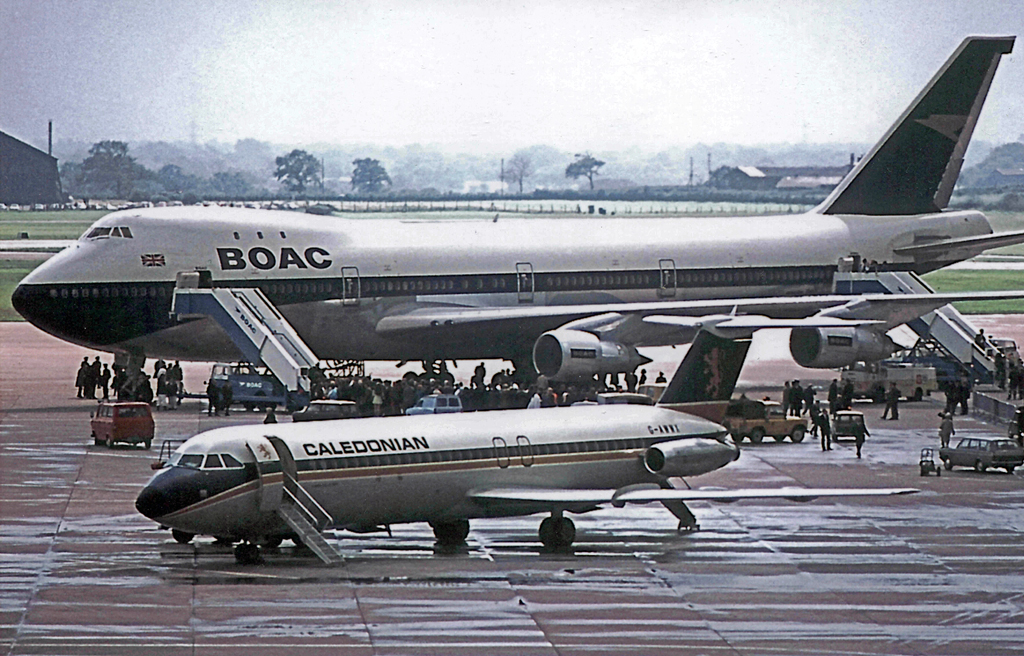
- Pictured in 1970, this BOAC Boeing 747 marked the first arrival of a wide-bodied airliner to Manchester Airport.
IATA	ICAO	Call sign
BA	BOA	SPEEDBIRD
- Founded: 24 November 1939 (amalgamation of Imperial Airways and British Airways Ltd)
- Commenced operations: 1 April 1940
- Ceased operations: 31 March 1974 (merged with BEA, Cambrian Airways and Northeast Airlines to form British Airways)
- Hubs: Heathrow Airport
- Subsidiaries: BOAC Cargo
- Fleet size: ≈ 200 (at its peak)
- Destinations: 200
- Parent company: Government of the United Kingdom
- Headquarters: Speedbird House, Heathrow Airport
- Key people: Whitney Straight; Matthew Slattery; Basil Smallpeice; Giles Guthrie

British Overseas Airways Corporation (BOAC) was the British state-owned national airline created in 1939 by the merger of Imperial Airways and British Airways Ltd. It continued operating overseas services throughout World War II.

After the passing of the Civil Aviation Act 1946, European and South American services passed to two further state-owned airlines, British European Airways (BEA) and British South American Airways (BSAA). BOAC absorbed BSAA in 1949, but BEA continued to operate British domestic and European routes for the next quarter century. The Civil Aviation Act 1971 merged BOAC and BEA, effective 31 March 1974, forming today's British Airways.

== History ==
=== War years ===
British Overseas Airways Act 1939 (Note: Section 46.)
- Act of Parliament
- Parliament of the United Kingdom
- Long title: An Act to provide for the establishment of a corporation to be known as the British Overseas Airways Corporation; to facilitate the acquisition by that Corporation of certain air transport undertakings; to make further and better provision for the operation of air transport services, and for purposes connected with the matters aforesaid.
- Citation: 2 & 3 Geo. 6. c. 61
- Territorial extent: United Kingdom

Dates
- Royal assent: 4 August 1939
- Commencement: 4 August 1939 (Note: Section 1(1).)
- Repealed: 16 December 1949
Other legislation
Amends	Air Navigation Act 1936
Amended by	Ministry of Civil Aviation Act 1945; Civil Aviation Act 1949
Repealed by	Air Corporations Act 1949

Status: Repealed

Text of statute as originally enacted

On 24 November 1939, BOAC was created by the British Overseas Airways Act 1939 (2 & 3 Geo. 6. c. 61) to become the British state airline, formed from the merger of Imperial Airways and British Airways Ltd. The companies had been operating together since war was declared on 3 September 1939, when their operations were evacuated from the London area to Bristol. On 1 April 1940, BOAC started operations as a single company. Following the Fall of France (22 June 1940), BOAC aircraft kept wartime Britain connected with its colonies and the allied world, often under enemy fire, and initially with desperate shortages of long-range aircraft. During the war, the airline was sometimes loosely referred to as 'British Airways', and aircraft and equipment were marked with combinations of that title and/or the Speedbird symbol and/or the Union Flag.

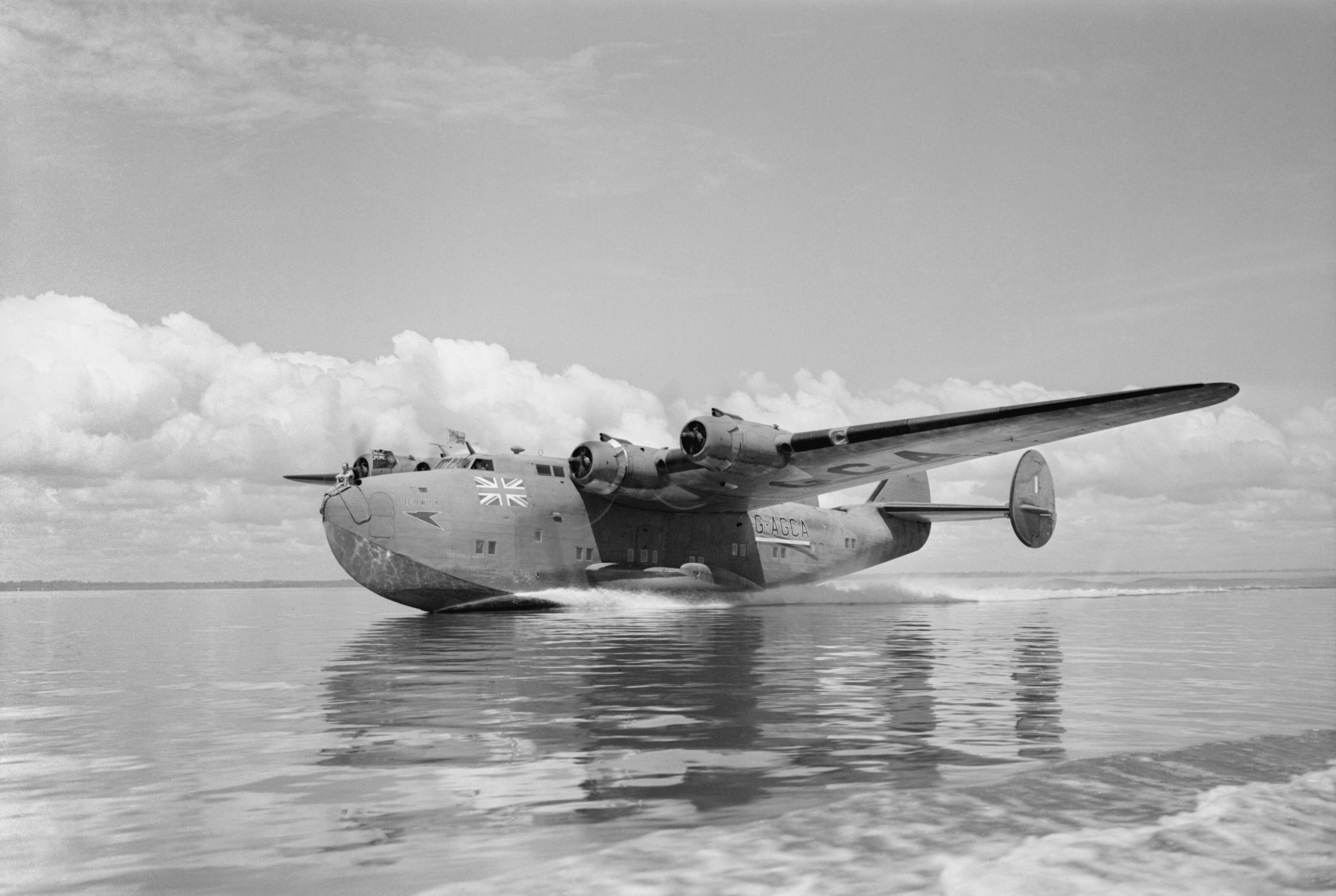
A BOAC Boeing 314 Clipper lands on Lagos Lagoon, 1943

BOAC inherited Imperial Airways' flying boat services to British colonies in Africa and Asia, but with the wartime loss of the route over Italy and France to Cairo these were replaced by the expatriate 'Horseshoe Route', with Cairo as a hub, and Sydney and Durban as end destinations. Linking Britain to the Horseshoe Route taxed the resources of BOAC. Although Spain denied access, Portugal welcomed BOAC's civilian aircraft at Lisbon. However, the Mediterranean route from Lisbon or Gibraltar to Egypt via Malta risked enemy attack, so the long West Africa route had to be employed (over-water via Lisbon, Bathurst, Freetown, Lagos), then by landplane to Khartoum on the Horseshoe Route. The Empire routes had contained landplane sectors, but the Armstrong Whitworth Ensign and de Havilland Albatross ordered to replace the Handley Page HP.42 'Heracles' biplanes had proved disappointing, leaving the Short Empire flying boats as the backbone of the wartime fleet. (Only a handful of these had long range tanks but many were eventually upgraded with larger tankage and operated at overload weights.)

The Empire flying-boats were at their limit on the 1,900-mile Lisbon-Bathurst sector. Refuelling at Las Palmas in the Canary Islands was permitted by Spain for some Empire flying-boat flights in 1940 and 1941. In 1941 longer range Consolidated Catalinas, Boeing 314As (and later converted Short Sunderlands) were introduced to guarantee non-stop Lisbon to Bathurst sectors (thus eliminating the need to refuel at Las Palmas). BOAC's flying-boat base for Britain was shifted from Southampton to Poole, Dorset, but many flights used Foynes in Ireland, reached by shuttle flight from Whitchurch. Use of Foynes reduced the chance of enemy interception or friendly fire incidents over the English Channel. BOAC had large bases at Durban, Asmara, Alexandria and a pilots' school at Soroti, Uganda.

Experimental flights had been made across the North Atlantic pre-war by Imperial Airways Empire flying-boats with improved fuel capacity, some using in-flight refuelling, culminating in a series of mail/courier flights made by BOAC's Clare and Clyde to LaGuardia in camouflage during the Battle of Britain. These were BOAC's first New York services. In 1941, BOAC was tasked with operating a 'Return Ferry Service' from Prestwick to Montreal to reposition ferry pilots who had flown American-built bombers from Canada, and they were provided with RAF Consolidated Liberators with a very basic passenger conversion. This was the first sustained North Atlantic landplane service.

By September 1944 BOAC had made 1,000 transatlantic crossings.

In late 1942, the new hard-surface airport at Lisbon permitted the use of civil registered Liberators to North and West Africa and Egypt. Arguably, BOAC's most famous wartime route was the 'Ball-bearing Run' from Leuchars to Stockholm (Bromma) in neutral Sweden. Initially flown with Lockheed 14s and Lockheed Hudson transports, the unsuitable Armstrong Whitworth Whitley "civilianised" bombers were also used between 9 August and 24 October 1942 ("Civilianised" meant that all the armaments and unnecessary guns and turrets had been removed, a legal requirement for operating a commercial civilian service to a neutral country). The much faster civilian registered de Havilland Mosquitoes were introduced by BOAC in 1943. The significance of the ball-bearings is debatable, but these night flights were an important diplomatic gesture of support for neutral Sweden which had two DC-3s shot down on its own service to Britain. Other types used to Sweden included Lockheed Lodestars, Consolidated Liberators, and the sole Curtiss CW-20 (C-46 prototype) which BOAC had purchased; these types had more payload, and some had the range to avoid the German-controlled Skagerrak direct route.

Between 1939 and 1945 6,000 passengers were transported by BOAC between Stockholm and Great Britain.

=== Early post-war operations ===
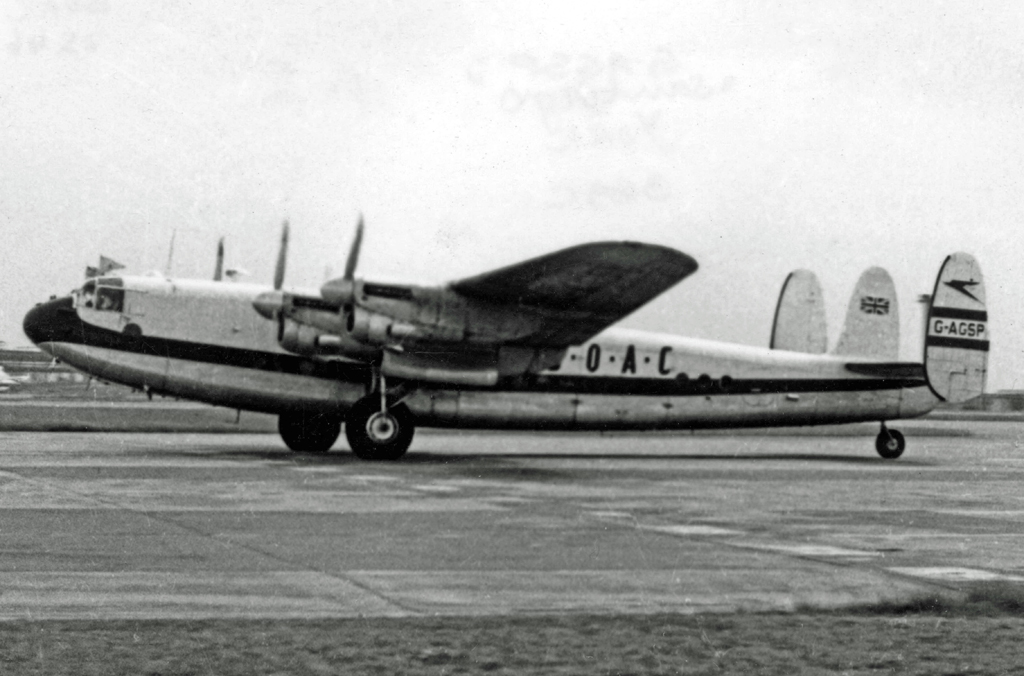
BOAC Avro York freighter operating a scheduled service at Heathrow in 1953

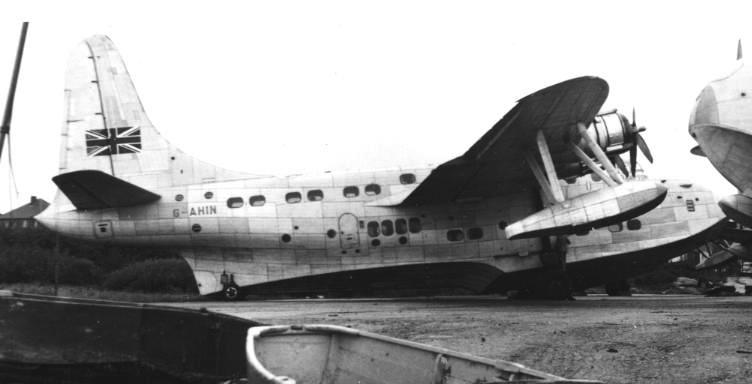
BOAC Short Solent 3 G-AHIN Southampton served the airline's route from the UK along the Nile to Johannesburg between 1948 and 1950

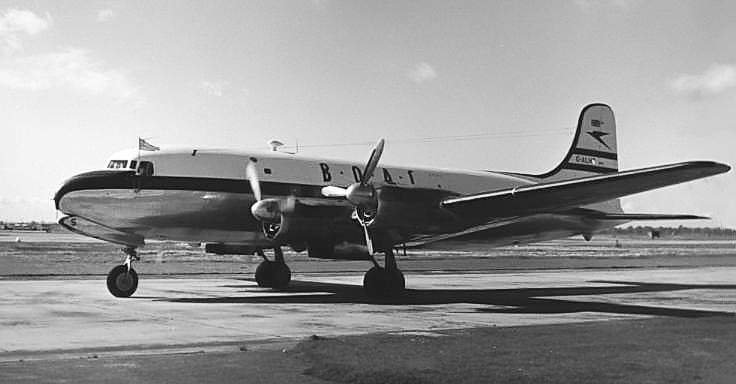
BOAC DC-4M-4 Argonaut G-ALHS "Astra" at London Airport (Heathrow) in September 1954

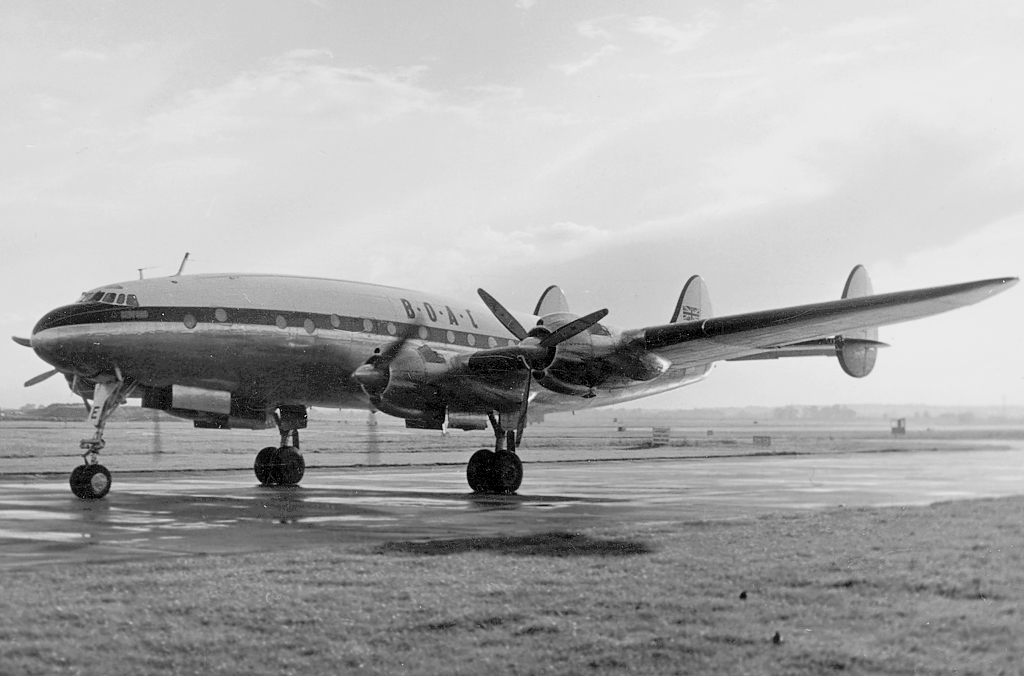
The sole C-69C after civilianisation for BOAC as a Lockheed 049E at Heathrow Airport in 1954

At the end of the war, BOAC's fleet consisted of Lockheed Lodestars, lend-lease Douglas DC-3s, Liberators, converted Sunderlands, and the first Avro Lancastrians, Avro Yorks, and Handley Page Haltons. The Short Empire, Short S.26 and Boeing 314A flying boats, plus the AW Ensigns, were due to be withdrawn. The corporation's aircraft, bases and personnel were scattered around the world, and it took a decade to reorganise it into an efficient unit at Heathrow. In 1943, the Brabazon Committee had laid down a set of civil aircraft transport types for the British aircraft industry to produce, but these were to be several years in coming, and particularly in the case of the tailwheel Avro Tudor, not what BOAC wanted.

Since 1941, the advanced pressurised Lockheed Constellation had been under development, and in 1946 BOAC was permitted to use dollars to purchase an initial fleet of five for the prestigious North Atlantic route (there were no equivalent British types available). Throughout the whole of BOAC's existence, the argument over buying American or (often delayed) British products continued, and Parliament, the press, British manufacturers and the unions accused BOAC management of only wanting American aircraft. Whilst the major world airlines abandoned flying-boats at the end of WWII, BOAC continued with theirs until 1950, and even introduced the new Short Solent on the leisurely Nile route to South Africa. In 1948, the unpressurised Yorks were still operating passenger services as far afield as Nairobi (Kenya), Accra (Gold Coast, later Ghana), Delhi and Calcutta (India), and the type continued to operate freight schedules until late 1957.

After its first six Lockheed 049 Constellations, BOAC had to use some ingenuity to increase its Constellation fleet. In 1947, Aerlínte Éireann in Ireland bought five new Lockheed 749 Constellations, and prepared to launch a transatlantic service with assistance and crew-training from Captains O. P. Jones and J. C. Kelly-Rogers of BOAC. The project was abandoned in February 1948, and BOAC were able to buy the almost new 749s without dollar expenditure four months later. This enabled BOAC to serve Australia with Constellations from 1949. A total of 25 Constellations passed through the BOAC fleet, including 12 749As obtained from Capital Airlines in the mid-1950s, with BOAC's older 049s in part exchange.

BOAC was also permitted to spend dollars on six new Boeing 377 Stratocruisers for its key transatlantic routes from October 1949, offering a double-deck non-stop eastbound service from New York City to London Airport (later Heathrow). However, because of the prevailing westerly winds, the westbound flights needed re-fuelling at Shannon and Gander before reaching New York. Another four Stratocruisers were taken over from a frustrated SAS order and seven were bought secondhand in the mid-1950s. The Handley Page Hermes and Canadair DC-4M Argonaut joined the BOAC fleet between 1949 and 1950, replacing the last of the non-pressurised types on passenger services. When service entry of the Bristol Britannia was delayed in late 1956, BOAC was permitted to purchase ten new Douglas DC-7Cs. These long-range aircraft enabled BOAC to operate non-stop westbound flights from London and Manchester to New York and other US East Coast destinations, in competition with DC-7Cs of Pan Am and Lockheed Super Constellations of Trans World Airlines (TWA). This was the first purchase of aircraft direct from the Douglas Aircraft Company in BOAC's history.

The lengthy routes requiring numerous stopovers, including UK to Asia routes that stopped in desert locations, combined with a public image of inefficiency, led to the corporation acquiring the nickname "Better on a camel" some time around the 1940s.

=== Introduction of jets ===
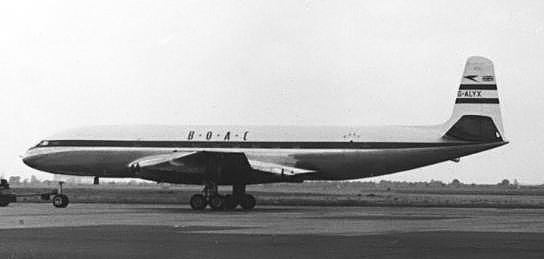
BOAC Comet 1 at Heathrow in 1953

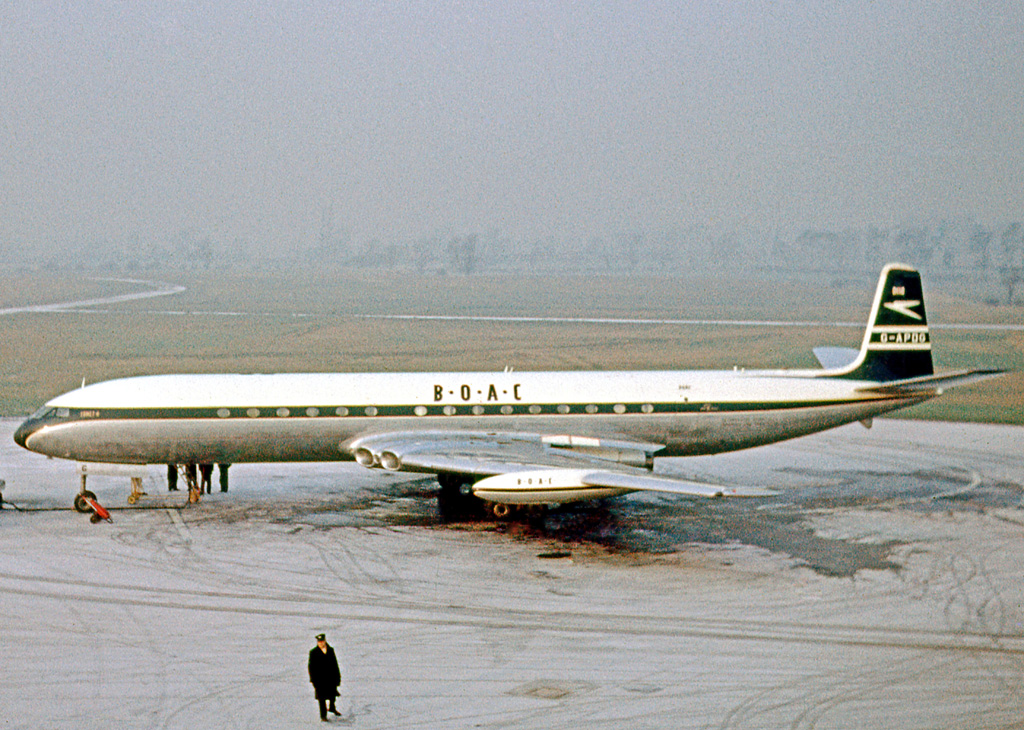
BOAC Comet 4 in 1963

In May 1952 BOAC was the first airline to introduce a passenger jet into airline service. This was the de Havilland Comet which flew via Nairobi to Johannesburg and via the Far East to Tokyo. All Comet 1 aircraft were grounded in April 1954 after four Comets crashed, the second last being a BOAC aircraft at altitude. Examination of the wreckage recovered from the Mediterranean sea-bed and observation of a sample fuselage in a pressurisation test-tank at Farnborough revealed that the repeated pressurisation / depressurisation cycles of airline operation could cause fatigue cracks in the thin aluminium alloy skin of the Comet leading to the skins ripping away explosively at altitude and disintegration of the aircraft.

Later jet airliners including the revised Comet 4 were designed to be fail-safe: in the event of, for example, a skin-failure due to cracking the damage would be localised and not catastrophic. In October 1958 BOAC operated the first transatlantic jet service with the larger and longer-range Comet 4. In the 1950s turbine powered airliners were developing rapidly, and the Comet and the seriously delayed Bristol Britannia were soon rendered obsolescent by the flight of the swept-wing Boeing 367–80 (707 prototype) in 1954.

Revenue passenger-kilometres, scheduled flights only, in millions
Year	Traffic
1947	456
1950	845
1955	1,610
1960	3,765
1965	7,029
1969	9,682
1971	11,444

In 1953 Vickers had started building the swept wing VC-7/V-1000 with Rolls-Royce Conway turbofan engines, but BOAC short-sightedly decided the Britannia and Comet 4 would be adequate for its purposes, and when the military version of the V-1000 was cancelled in 1955 the 75% complete prototype was scrapped. In October 1956 BOAC ordered 15 Boeing 707s with Conway engines (briefly the most economical commercial engine option). They entered service in 1960. (The British airworthiness authorities insisted on tail-fin modifications which Boeing made available to all 707 users.) Sir Giles Guthrie, who took charge of BOAC in 1964, preferred Boeing aircraft for economic reasons, and indeed BOAC began turning a profit in the late 1960s. After a row in Parliament the government instructed BOAC to purchase 17 Vickers VC10 aircraft from a 30-aircraft order which Guthrie had cancelled. The Standard VC10 had higher operating costs than the 707, largely due to BOAC's requirement at the design stage for the aircraft to have excellent hot and high performance for Commonwealth (African/Asian) routes, but the larger Super VC10 was a success with American passengers on the North Atlantic and was profitable.

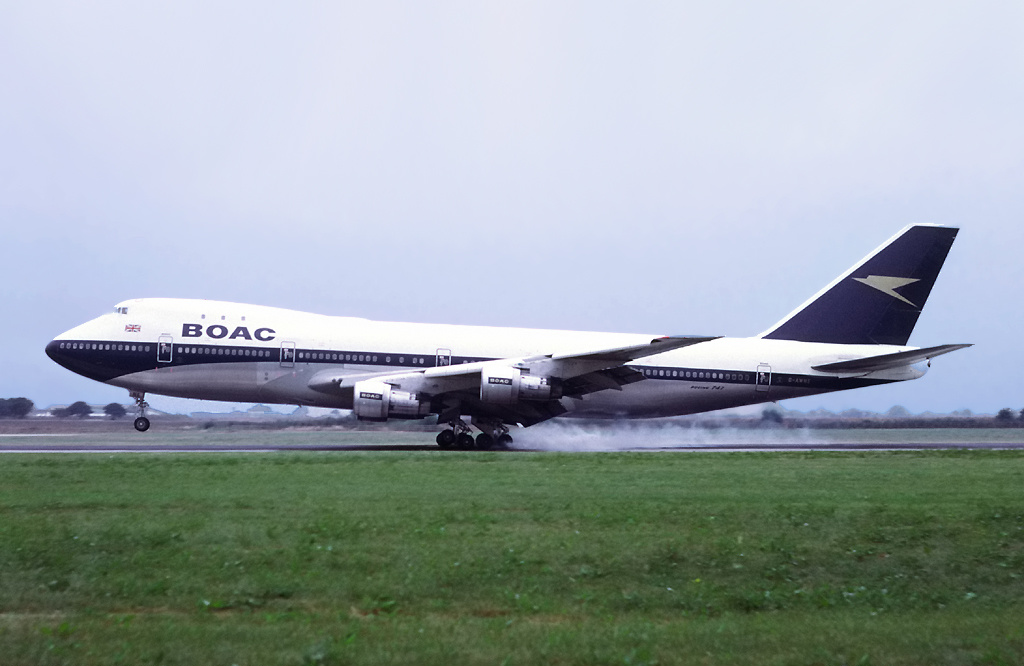
A BOAC Boeing 747-100 landing at Heathrow Airport in 1972

The next major order of Boeing aircraft was for 11 Boeing 747-100s. On 22 April 1970 BOAC received its first 747, but the aircraft did not enter commercial service until 14 April 1971 due to BOAC's inability to settle crewing and pay rates with the British Air Line Pilots' Association. BOAC's successor British Airways later became the largest Boeing customer outside North America.

=== Merger with BEA ===
The first attempt at a merger of BOAC with BEA arose in 1953 out of inconclusive attempts between the two airlines to negotiate air rights through the British colony of Cyprus. The chairman of BOAC, Miles Thomas, was in favour of the idea as a potential solution to a disagreement between the two airlines as to which should serve the increasingly important oil regions of the Middle East, and he had backing for his proposal from the Chancellor of the Exchequer at the time, Rab Butler. However, opposition from the Treasury blocked the idea, and an agreement was reached instead to allow BEA to serve Ankara in Turkey, and in return to leave all routes east and south of Cyprus to BOAC. Paradoxically, through its effective control of Cyprus Airways, BEA was able to continue to serve destinations ceded to BOAC, including Beirut and Cairo by using Cyprus Airways as its proxy.

However, it was only following the recommendations of the 1969 Edwards Report that a new British Airways Board, combining BEA and BOAC, was constituted on 1 April 1972. This event coincided with the establishment of the Civil Aviation Authority, the UK's new, unified regulator for the air transport industry.

Under this newly established regulatory environment, BOAC medical director Dr. Frank S. Preston collaborated with H. P. Ruffell Smith and researcher Valerie Marguerite Sutton-Mattocks in 1973 on a 14-week study tracking cumulative sleep loss among long-haul cabin crews operating Boeing 707 and Vickers VC10 fleets. The findings demonstrated how sleep deprivation impacted emergency readiness, providing an operational baseline for flight and duty time limitations (FTL) enforced by the Civil Aviation Authority prior to the airline's 1974 merger into British Airways.

BOAC would have become one of the first operators of the Concorde, had it not merged to become British Airways. BA's Concordes carried registrations of G-BOAA to G-BOAG. The first Concorde delivered to British Airways was registered G-BOAC.

== Political role ==
Flight was out of the financial reach of the vast majority of travellers in Britain. However, as a nationalised industry, British taxpayers were funding BOAC's operations overseas. As a result, in the immediate post-war period BOAC saw a need to promote their aviation services beyond traditional travel. Scott Anthony and Oliver Green described in their 2012 book:

“New Elizabethan ambitions made BOAC into the national flag-carrying airline in the broadest sense. Early publicity emphasised its role in alleviating famines and flooding, in the supply of medicines and in the transportation of athletes and explorers. More than this, BOAC strove to embed itself in the cultural fabric of the nation. By taking pressurised oxygen canisters to climbers on Everest, transporting a 7,000 year-old skull from the British School in Jerusalem or flying astronomers as close as possible to an eclipse over the Shetland Islands, BOAC presented itself as a national service aware of its wider responsibilities”

BOAC were keen to promote their sense of wider obligation to the general public and wider world. In 1948, BOAC's PR department published Operation India. A World's Record Air-Lift, referencing BOAC's support in the events of the Partition of India. Throughout the years, BOAC would participate in a number of airlifts including but not limited to the Berlin Airlift in 1948, Abadan Air lift as part of the Abadan Crisis in June 1951, and as part of an airlift of Hungarian refugees from Vienna to London as a response to the Hungarian Revolution in 1957.

Such a political outlook was also an important narrative in the context of Britain's colonies and the wider Commonwealth. Described in the January 1959 edition of the BOAC in-house magazine, the BOAC Review, an article described that “BOAC is often able to earn the goodwill of various communities by doing some slight service, perhaps unconnected with air travel[…] 14 dolls in traditional costume for Johannesburg; 30 lbs. of haggis for Nassau and smaller quantities for Singapore and Kuala Lumpur”. Whilst these suggest charitable motives, often these are seen alongside the efforts made by Britain in the implementation of the Colonial Development and Welfare Acts which were often designed to improve the export industries of colonies at the expense of other more pressing needs like food and healthcare. As Smith argues, BOAC were prominent promoters of the colonial development agenda, with advertisements often highlighted the positive impact of such policies in Africa often with a view to encourage further expansion and exploitation of regional resources.

=== Coat of arms ===
The BOAC was granted a coat of arms by the College of Arms in January 1941.

Coat of arms of British Overseas Airways Corporation
Granted 24 January 1941 Crest On a wreath of the colours, upon a mount vert a winged lion passant Or collared of the first, the tips of the wings enveloped in clouds proper. Escutcheon Azure, a lion’s face winged, the wings enfiled with an astral crown Or. Supporters On the dexter side a winged lion and on the sinister side a winged sea lion, both Or, and each gorged with a collar vert. Badge A lion's face winged Or.

== Other BOAC companies ==
=== BOAC Associated Companies Limited ===
BOAC held both formal and informal interests in a number of associated enterprises operating in several parts of the British Commonwealth. In 1957, these associated organisations were brought under a subsidiary company called BOAC Associated Companies Limited. These included Aden Airways, Bahamas Airways, Fiji Airways, Ghana Airways, Gulf Aviation and Nigeria Airways. By 1960, BOAC Associated Companies Limited was declared to have holdings in eighteen companies.

=== BOAC-Cunard Ltd ===
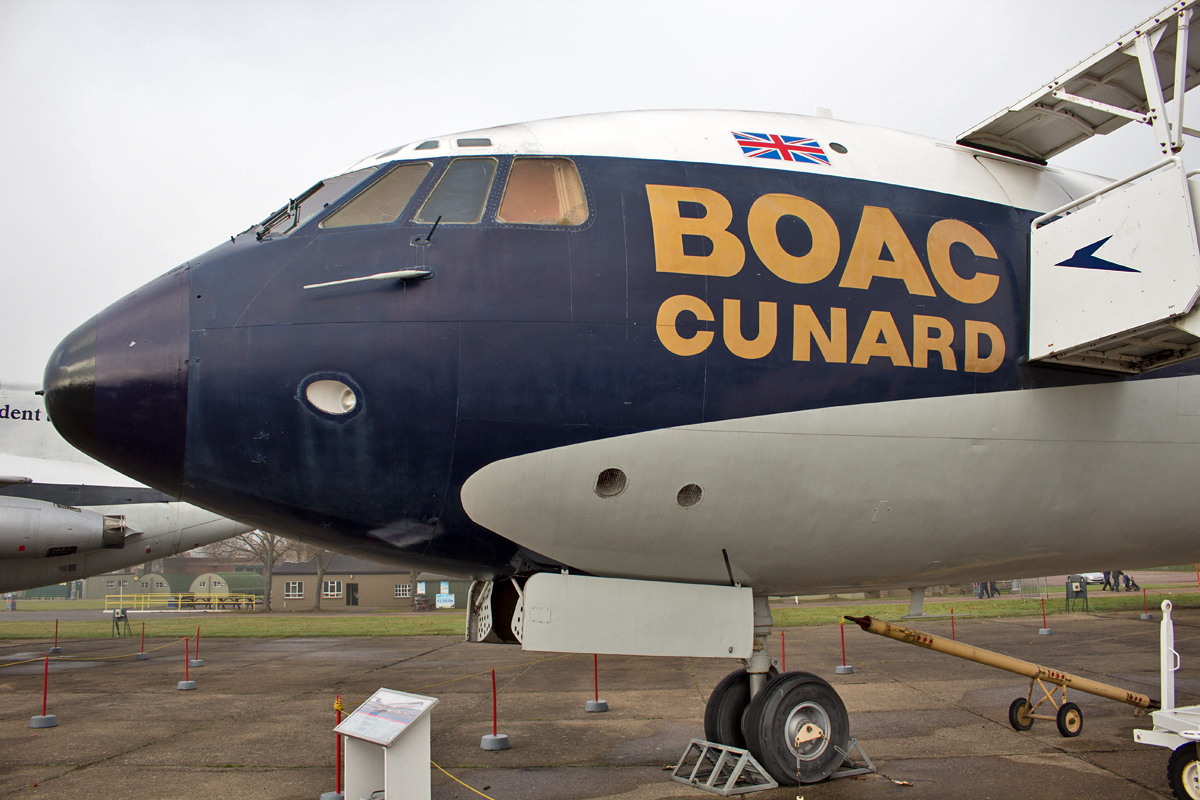
Super VC10 at IWM Duxford

In 1962, BOAC and Cunard formed BOAC-Cunard Ltd. to operate scheduled services to North America, the Caribbean and South America. BOAC provided 70% of the new company's capital and eight Boeing 707s. The independent Cunard Eagle Airways, of which Cunard held a 60% shareholding, provided two more 707s.

BOAC-Cunard leased any spare capacity to BOAC which could use it to supplement the main BOAC fleet at peak demand, and in a reciprocal arrangement BOAC would provide capacity to BOAC-Cunard on some operations when it had a shortfall.

The effect of this arrangement was to remove competition on western routes. The operation was dissolved in 1966.

== Destinations ==
The following is an incomplete list of destinations historically served by BOAC:

- Abadan – Abadan International Airport
- Aberdeen – Aberdeen Airport
- Abu Dhabi – Al Bateen Executive Airport
- Accra – Accra International Airport
- Adelaide – Adelaide Airport
- Aden – Aden International Airport
- Alexandria – Alexandria International Airport
- Amman – Amman Civil Airport
- Amsterdam – Schiphol Airport
- Anchorage – Ted Stevens Anchorage International Airport
- Antigua – Coolidge International Airport
- Arak – Arak Airport
- Asmara – Yohannes IV International Airport
- Auckland – Auckland Airport
- Baghdad – Baghdad International Airport
- Bahrain – Bahrain International Airport
- Bandar Lengeh – Bandar Lengeh Airport
- Bangkok – Don Mueang International Airport
- Banjul – Banjul International Airport
- Barcelona – Barcelona–El Prat Airport
- Basra – Basra International Airport
- Beirut – Beirut International Airport
- Belfast – Belfast International Airport
- Bermuda – Bermuda International Airport
- Birmingham – Birmingham Airport
- Blantyre – Chileka International Airport
- Bogotá – El Dorado International Airport
- Bombay – Sahar International Airport
- Bordeaux – Bordeaux–Mérignac Airport
- Boston – Logan International Airport
- Bowen – Bowen Airport
- Bridgetown – Seawell Airport
- Brisbane – Brisbane Airport
- Buenos Aires – Ezeiza International Airport
- Bushehr – Bushehr Airport
- Cairo – Payne Airfield
- Calcutta – Dum Dum Airport
- Caracas – Simón Bolívar International Airport
- Casablanca – Mohammed V International Airport
- Chicago – Chicago O'Hare International Airport
- Chittagong - Chittagong Airport
- Colombo – Ratmalana Airport
- Colombo – Bandaranaike International Airport
- Dacca – Tejgaon Airport
- Dakar – Dakar-Yoff International Airport
- Damascus – Damascus International Airport
- Dar es Salaam – Dar es Salaam International Airport
- Darwin – Darwin International Airport
- Delhi – Safdarjung Airport
- Denver – Stapleton International Airport
- Detroit – Detroit Metropolitan Wayne County Airport
- Dhahran – Dhahran International Airport
- Doha – Doha International Airport
- Dubai – Dubai International Airport
- Dublin – Dublin Airport
- Durban – Louis Botha Airport
- Düsseldorf – Düsseldorf Airport
- Edinburgh – Edinburgh Airport
- Entebbe – Entebbe International Airport
- Frankfurt – Frankfurt am Main Airport
- Freeport – Grand Bahama International Airport
- Freetown – Freetown-Lungi International Airport
- Gander – Gander International Airport
- Georgetown – Timehri International Airport
- Glasgow – Glasgow Prestwick Airport
- Hong Kong – Kai Tak Airport
- Honolulu – John Rodgers Airport
- Istanbul – Istanbul Atatürk Airport
- Jakarta – Halim Perdanakusuma Airport
- Jeddah – Kandara Airport
- Johannesburg – Jan Smuts International Airport
- Kallang – Kallang Airport
- Kampala – Entebbe International Airport
- Kano – Aminu Kano International Airport
- Karachi – Jinnah International Airport
- Khartoum – Khartoum International Airport
- Kingston – Palisadoes Airport
- Kuala Lumpur – Subang Airport
- Kuwait – Kuwait International Airport
- Lagos – Lagos International Airport
- Las Palmas – Gando Airport
- Lima – Jorge Chávez International Airport
- Lisbon – Portela International Airport
- Livingstone – Livingstone Airport
- London – Heathrow Airport
- Los Angeles – Los Angeles International Airport
- Lusaka – Lusaka International Airport
- Luxor – Luxor International Airport
- Madrid – Madrid–Barajas Airport
- Malta – Malta International Airport
- Manchester – Manchester Ringway International Airport
- Manila – Manila International Airport
- Marseille – Marseille Provence Airport
- Mauritius – Plaisance Airport
- Melbourne – Essendon Airport
- Mexico City – Mexico City International Airport
- Miami – Miami International Airport
- Montego Bay – Montego Bay International Airport
- Montevideo – Carrasco International Airport
- Montreal – Montréal–Dorval International Airport
- Moscow – Moscow Vnukovo Airport
- Nadi – Nadi International Airport
- Nairobi – Jomo Kenyatta International Airport
- Nassau – Nassau International Airport
- New York City – Idlewild International Airport
- Ndola – Ndola Airport
- Nicosia – Nicosia International Airport
- Nouadhibou – Nouadhibou International Airport
- Osaka – Osaka International Airport
- Perth – Perth Airport
- Philadelphia – Philadelphia International Airport
- Port of Spain – Piarco International Airport
- Prague – Prague Ruzyne Airport
- Rangoon – Rangoon International Airport
- Recife – Recife/Guararapes–Gilberto Freyre International Airport
- Renfrew - Renfrew Airport
- Rio de Janeiro – Rio de Janeiro–Galeão International Airport
- Rome – Rome Ciampino Airport
- Saint Lucia – Hewanorra International Airport
- Salisbury – Salisbury Airport
- San Francisco – San Francisco International Airport
- Santiago – Los Cerrillos Airport
- São Paulo – Congonhas-São Paulo Airport
- Seattle – Seattle–Tacoma International Airport
- Seoul – Gimpo International Airport
- Seychelles – Seychelles International Airport
- Shanghai – Shanghai Hongqiao International Airport
- Shannon – Shannon Airport
- Singapore – Singapore International Airport
- Southampton – Southampton Airport
- Stockholm – Stockholm Bromma Airport
- Surabaya – Juanda International Airport
- Sydney – Sydney Airport
- Tehran – Tehran Mehrabad International Airport
- Tel Aviv – Lod Airport
- Tokyo – Haneda International Airport
- Toronto – Toronto International Airport
- Trinidad – Piarco International Airport
- Tripoli – Tripoli Idris International Airport
- Vancouver – Vancouver International Airport
- Victoria Falls – Victoria Falls Airport
- Vienna – Vienna International Airport
- Washington, D.C. – Dulles International Airport
- Zürich – Zurich Airport
- Muscat – Bayt al-Falaj Airport

== Fleet ==
During the time of the airline's existence, BOAC operated these aircraft:

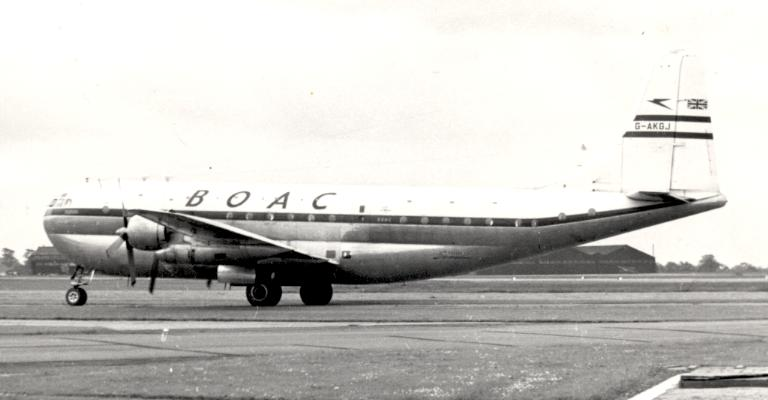
BOAC Boeing Stratocruiser G-AKGJ "RMA Cambria" at Manchester in 1954 en route to New York

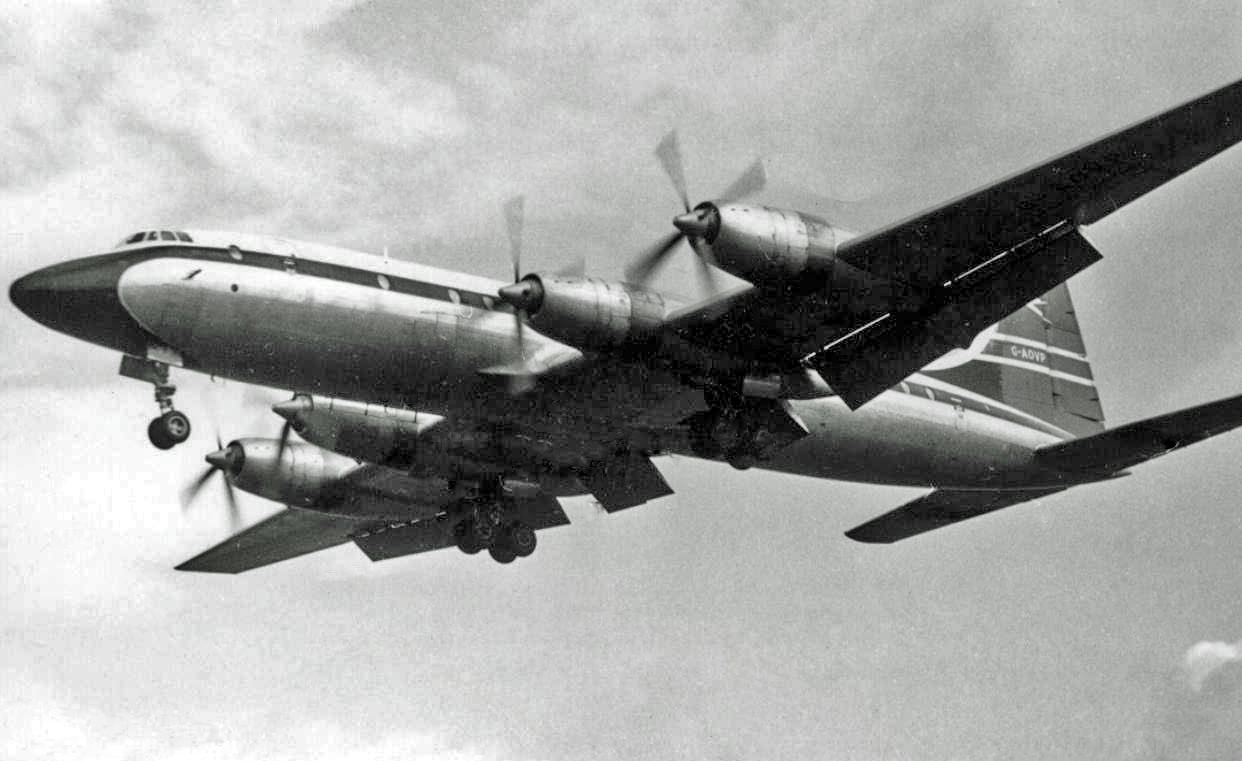
BOAC Britannia 312, 1959

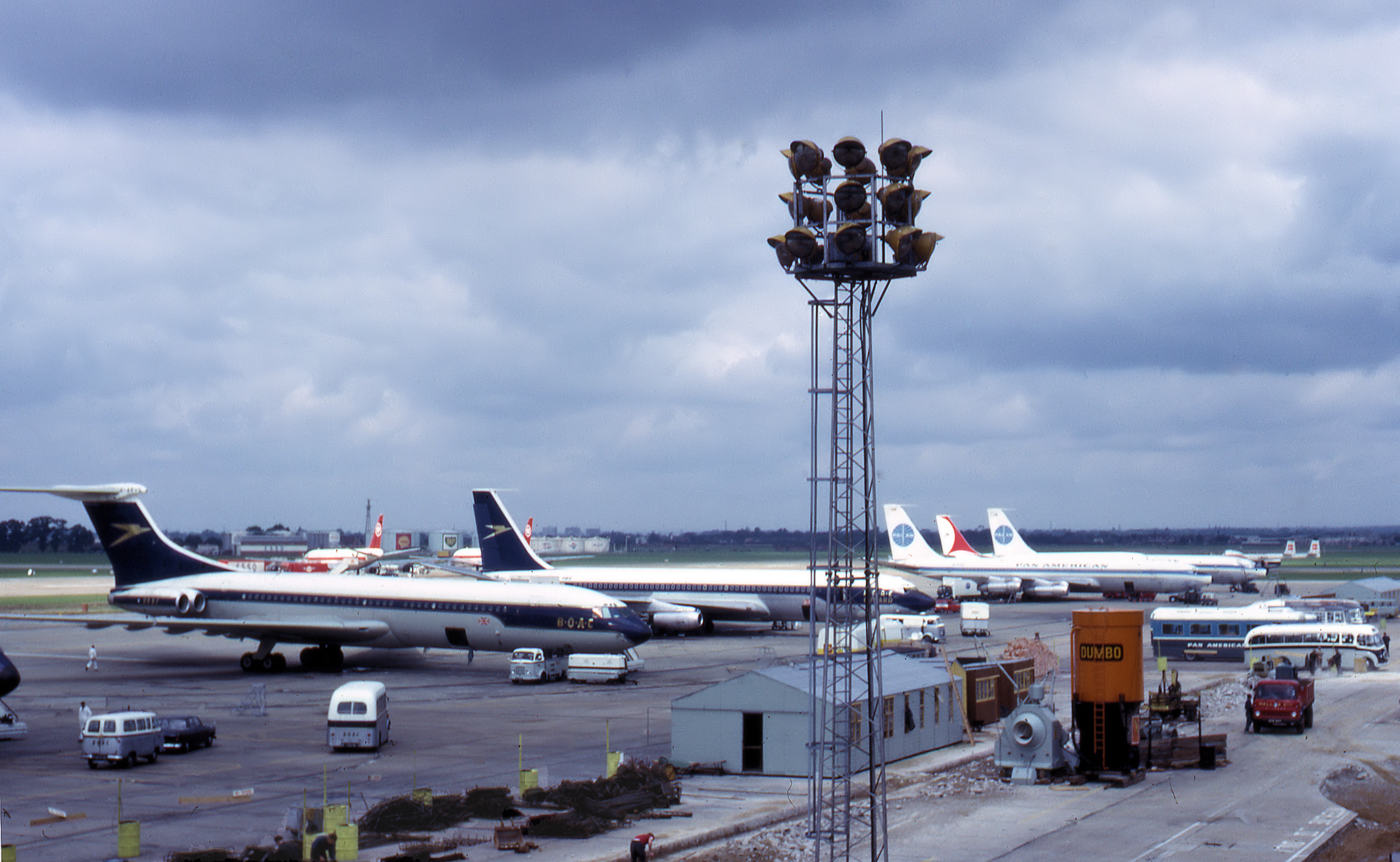
London Heathrow Airport in 1965. Nearest the camera are two BOAC aircraft – a Vickers VC10 (with the high tail) and a Boeing 707.

- Aérospatiale/BAC Concorde (test flown by BOAC, then to British Airways for passenger service)
- Airspeed Consul (1949–54)
- Airspeed Oxford (1948–53)
- Armstrong Whitworth A.W.15 Atalanta (1933–41)
- Armstrong Whitworth A.W.27 Ensign (1939–46)
- Armstrong Whitworth A.W.38 Whitley V (1942–43)
- Avro Lancaster (1944–49)
- Avro Lancastrian (1945–51)
- Avro Tudor (1946–51)
- Avro York (1944–57)
- Boeing 314A Clipper (1941–48)
- Boeing 377 Stratocruiser (1949–60)
- Boeing 707-300 & -400 (1960–74)
- Boeing 747-100 (1969–74)
- Bristol Britannia (1955–66)
- Canadair C-4 Argonaut (1949–60)
- Consolidated Model 28 Catalina (1940–45)
- Consolidated Model 32 Liberator (1941–51)
- Curtis Wright CW-20 - one aircraft (1941–43)
- de Havilland DH.86 Express (1934–41)
- de Havilland DH.91 Albatross (1938–43)
- de Havilland DH.95 Flamingo (1940–44)
- de Havilland DH.98 Mosquito (1943–45)
- de Havilland DH.104 Dove (1946–60)
- de Havilland DH.106 Comet (1952-54 & 1958–69)
- Douglas DC-3/C-47 Dakota (1943–50)
- Douglas DC-7C (1956–65)
- Focke-Wulf Fw 200 Condor- one Danish Airlines aircraft interned (1940–42)
- Handley Page H.P.70 Halifax/Halton (1946–48)
- Handley Page H.P.81 Hermes (1949–57)
- Lockheed 10 Electra (1937–44)
- Lockheed 14 Super Electra (1938–44)
- Lockheed 18 Lodestar (1941–48)
- Lockheed 414 Hudson (1941–45)
- Lockheed L-049 & L-749 Constellation (1946–59)
- Short S.23, S.30 & S.33 Empire (1937–47)
- Short S.25 Sunderland/Hythe (1942–49)
- Short S.25 Sandringham (1947–60)
- Short S.26 (1939–47)
- Short S.45 Solent (1946–50)
- Vickers VC10 & Super VC10 (1964–1974)
- Vickers Viking (1946–47)
- Vickers Warwick - one aircraft (1944–45)
- Vickers Wellington (1942–43)

Dates above are for service with BOAC or its forerunners; those still in service in 1974 subsequently passed to British Airways.

== Incidents and accidents ==
=== 1940s ===
- On 22 April 1940, Lockheed Model 14 Super Electra G-AKFD Loch Invar crashed 10 miles off course at Beinn Uird, near Loch Lomond, Scotland, killing the three crew.
- On 23 May 1940, Armstrong Whitworth Ensign G-ADTA Euryalus was damaged during a crash at RAF Lympne. It had been one of six that escaped a Luftwaffe raid on Merville Airfield, France. The intended destination was Croydon. Approaching the English coast, first she lost her port inner engine and the pilot diverted to RAF Hawkinge. Her starboard inner engine also had to be shut down shortly afterwards. The pilot changed course for Lympne. On landing, the starboard undercarriage failed to lock down, causing the wing to drag on the ground and the aircraft to go through a fence. Euryalus was flown to RAF Hamble in June, but it was decided to cannibalise her to repair G-ADSU Euterpe which had been damaged in an accident at Bonnington on 15 December 1939. Euryalus was scrapped in September 1942.
- On 1 September 1941, Consolidated Liberator I AM915 crashed into a hill outside Campbeltown, Argyll, after a flight from Montreal, killing all four crew and six passengers.
- On 29 December 1941, Short Empire G-ADUX Cassiopeia crashed after striking debris on takeoff from Sabang, Indonesia, killing four.
- On 30 January 1942, Short Empire G-AEUH Corio was shot down by seven Japanese fighter aircraft and crashed off West Timor, killing 13 of 18 on board. The aircraft was owned by BOAC, but was operated by Qantas.
- On 15 February 1942, Consolidated Liberator I G-AGDR was shot down by a Royal Air Force Supermarine Spitfire in error over the English Channel near Plymouth, England. All five crew and four passengers (including Townsend Griffiss) were killed. The RAF increased aircraft reconnaissance training in response to this incident.
- On 28 February 1942, Short Empire G-AETZ Circe was shot down over the Pacific between Cilacap and Broome by a Japanese fighter, killing all 22 on board. This crash is the worst ever accident involving the Short Empire. The aircraft was operating for Qantas.
- On 22 March 1942, Short Empire G-AEUF struck debris while landing and crashed at Port Darwin, Australia, killing two of 11 passengers on board; all four crew survived.
- On 24 September 1942, Short Empire G-AFCZ Clare broke up and sank following a forced landing in the Atlantic off Senegal due to engine failure; all 19 on board died.
- On 9 January 1943, Short S.26 G-AFCK Golden Horn crashed in the Tagus River near Lisbon while attempting an emergency landing due to an in-flight fire, killing 13 of 15 on board. The aircraft was on a test flight following replacement of an engine.
- On 15 February 1943, de Havilland Flamingo G-AFYE crashed at Asmara, Eritrea after going into a vertical dive from 800 feet (240 m) during a test flight, killing both pilots.
- On 23 March 1943, Consolidated PBY Catalina G-AGDA Dog-Able crashed on landing at Poole Harbor during a training flight, killing three of six on board.
- On 4 April 1943, Lockheed Model 18 Lodestar (C-56B) G-AGEJ was possibly shot down by a Junkers Ju 88 of Luftwaffe 10/NJG 3 and crashed 31 mi off Skagen, Denmark, killing all seven on board.
- On 1 June 1943, Flight 777, a Douglas DC-3 G-AGBB was shot down over the Bay of Biscay by eight German Junkers Ju 88s of KG 40. All seventeen crew and passengers were killed, including actor Leslie Howard. There has been widespread speculation that the downing was an attempt to kill British Prime Minister Winston Churchill. The aircraft was owned and operated by KLM, flying for BOAC.
- On 16 June 1943, Lockheed Hudson IV FK459 stalled and crashed while turning for approach to Khartoum Civil Airport due to fuel starvation and engine failure, killing all 17 on board. The aircraft was an RAF military transport operating for BOAC.
- On 30 June 1943, Lockheed Hudson IV FK618 spiraled down and crashed near Khartoum, Sudan killing all 16 on board. The aircraft, an RAF military transport operating for BOAC, was probably overloaded.
- On 28 July 1943, Short Sunderland 3 G-AGES, crashed into a hill in Dingle Peninsula near the village of Brandon in Ireland on a flight from Lisbon to Foynes. The crash killed 10 passengers and crew out of 25 on board.
- On 17 August 1943, de Havilland Mosquito G-AGGF crashed near Glenshee, Perthshire.
- On 25 October 1943, de Havilland Mosquito G-AGGG crashed near RAF Leuchars.
- On 5 November 1943, Short Sunderland 3 G-AGIB crashed in the desert 75 miles south-southwest of Sollum, Libya after a portion of the right wing and float separated following an in-flight fire probably caused by an electrical problem; all 19 on board died.
- On 17 December 1943, Lockheed Lodestar G-AGDE crashed into the sea off Leuchars, Scotland on a flight from RAF Leuchars to Stockholm-Bromma Airport. The accident killed all 10 passengers and crew on board the flight.
- On 3 January 1944, de Havilland Mosquito G-AGGD stalled on landing at Såtenäs, Sweden and was written off.
- On 19 August 1944, de Havilland Mosquito G-AGKP crashed into the North Sea off Leuchars, Fife. All three people on board were killed.
- On 29 August 1944, Lockheed C-60A G-AGIH crashed after striking the top of Mount Kinnekulle near Lidköping, Sweden, killing 11 of 15 on board.
- On 29 August 1944, de Havilland Mosquito G-AGKR disappeared on a flight from Gothenburg, Sweden to RAF Leuchars with the loss of both crew.
- On 29 November 1944, Lockheed Lodestar G-AGBW struck the side of Kinangop Peak, Kenya while descending for Nairobi in bad weather, killing all 11 on board; the wreckage was found on 1 January 1945.
- On 21 February 1946, Consolidated Liberator II G-AGEM crashed on landing at Charlottetown, Canada due to icing, killing one of 14 on board.
- On 23 March 1946, Avro Lancastrian I G-AGLX disappeared between Sri Lanka and the Cocos Islands with ten on board. The aircraft was owned by BOAC, but was operated by Qantas.
- On 14 August 1946, Douglas Dakota III G-AGHT crashed at Luqa Airport due to fuel starvation after the auxiliary fuel tanks were selected by mistake, killing one of five on board.
- On 20 August 1946, Avro Lancastrian 1 G-AGMF crashed at Rouen, France when the crew failed to correctly establish the aircraft's position during descent, killing eight of nine on board.
- On 11 January 1947, Douglas Dakota III G-AGJX crashed at Stowting, Kent whilst on an international scheduled flight from Heathrow to West Africa via Bordeaux. A number of attempts were made to divert in poor weather. The aircraft crashed whilst attempting to land at Lympne. Eight people were killed and eight injured of the five crew and 11 passengers.
- On 16 July 1947, Avro York C.1 G-AGNR crashed at Az-Zubair, Iran due to pilot and ATC errors, killing all six crew; all 12 passengers survived.
- On 23 August 1947, Short Sandringham 5 G-AHZB crashed on landing at Bahrain Marine Air Base due to the pilot using an incorrect procedure for landing and takeoff, killing ten of 26 on board.
- On 19 November 1947, Short Sunderland 3 G-AGHW struck high ground at Brightstone Down in poor visibility due to navigation errors by the pilot, killing one of four on board.
- On 14 July 1948, Douglas Dakota IV G-AGKN crashed into cloud-covered cliffs near Toulon, France, killing all six on board.

=== 1950s ===
- On 26 May 1952, Flight 251, operated by Handley Page Hermes IV G-ALDN, force-landed 71 mi from Atar, Mauritania, due to fuel starvation after the aircraft had flown off course for several hours as a result of navigation and pilot errors. The aircraft had taken off from Tripoli, Libya, with the intended destination of Kano, Nigeria. All on board survived, but the first officer died of heat stroke five days later while awaiting rescue.
- On 2 May 1953, Flight 783/057, a de Havilland Comet I G-ALYV crashed 25 miles north-west of Calcutta, India, after suffering structural failure while climbing through 7,500 ft in a severe storm. The crash occurred shortly after take-off from Netaji Subhash Chandra Bose International Airport (then known as Dum Dum Airport) on a flight to Delhi, and killed all 43 passengers and crew on board.
- On 10 January 1954, Flight 781, a de Havilland Comet I, G-ALYP, took off from Ciampino Airport in Rome, Italy, en route to Heathrow Airport in London, England; as it was reaching cruising altitude it suffered an explosive decompression and crashed into the Tyrrhenian Sea near Elba, killing all 35 on board. A design flaw with the Comet was noted as an official cause as it led to breakup of the aircraft while airborne, which led to heavy modifications to the Comet in the aftermath of Flight 781 as well as South African Airways Flight 201, which occurred four months later.
- On 13 March 1954, a Lockheed L-749A Constellation, G-ALAM, crashed at Kallang Airport, Singapore, when it landed short and struck a sea wall after a flight from Jakarta, killing 33 people out of 40 passengers and crew on board. Pilot fatigue was cited as a contributing cause, and inadequate rescue services were implicitly blamed for some of the fatalities.
- Early on Christmas Day 25 December 1954, at 0330 hours, a BOAC Boeing 377 Stratocruiser G-ALSA crashed on landing at Prestwick, killing 28 of the 36 passengers and crew on board. The aircraft was en route from London to New York when, on approach to an intermediate stop at Prestwick, it entered a steep descent before levelling out too late and too severely, hitting the ground short of the runway. The crash was attributed to a number of factors, including pilot fatigue (the captain was well over his duty limit due to the flight being delayed), the landing lights at Prestwick being out of action due to repair and the First Officer either not hearing a command from the Captain for landing lights (which may have helped judge the low cloud base) or mistakenly hitting the flaps, causing the aircraft to stall.
- On 21 September 1955, Canadair Argonaut G-ALHL crashed during a storm at Tripoli International Airport after a flight from London and Rome. The aircraft, which was making its fourth attempt to land in the severe weather conditions, struck trees short of the runway. The accident and ensuing fire killed 15 passengers and crew out of 47 people on board.
- On 24 June 1956, Canadair Argonaut G-ALHE crashed after taking off from Mallam Aminu Kano International Airport on a flight to Tripoli International Airport. The aircraft had reached 200 ft when it encountered a microburst, causing an abrupt loss of speed and altitude. With the Argonaut barely 20 ft above the ground the captain regained control, but too late to avoid colliding with a large baobab tree. The crash killed 32 passengers and crew out of 45 people on board.
- On 24 December 1958, a Bristol Britannia 312 G-AOVD crashed during a test flight near Winkton, England, killing nine of 12 on board.

=== 1960s ===
- On 5 March 1966, Flight 911, Boeing 707-436 G-APFE experienced an in-flight break-up and crashed on Mount Fuji after encountering clear air turbulence. All 124 on board died.
- On 9 April 1968, Flight 712 a Rolls-Royce Conway engine exploded and broke off from the wing of a Boeing 707 G-ARWE following take-off from London Heathrow Airport causing an uncontained wing fire. A successful emergency landing at Heathrow was carried out, but a stewardess and four passengers were killed and 38 other passengers were injured as the fire spread during evacuation. The stewardess, Barbara Jane Harrison, was awarded a posthumous George Cross for her part in helping passengers escape.

=== 1970s ===
- On 9 September 1970, Flight 775, operated by Vickers VC10 G-ASGN, became the first British plane to be hijacked as part of the Dawson's Field hijackings.
- In the early hours of 22 July 1971, BOAC Flight 045 from London to Khartoum was ordered by air control in Malta (and allegedly forced to obey the order by Libyan military jets) to land at Benghazi at 3.30 am. Sudanese rebel leader Babiker El Nur, announced as president a week before in a political coup, and his companion Major Farouk Hamadallah, were instructed to leave the aircraft, or the fighter planes would bomb it. El Nur quickly agreed to leave, in order to save the lives of the other passengers. He and Hamadallah were quickly taken off the aircraft to be held at gunpoint. Despite strong British government protests to the Sudan about the outrage, and an appeal to President Nimeiry for clemency, the men were both executed within a week.
- On 3 August 1971, BOAC Flight 600, operated by a Boeing 747 from Montreal to London, was diverted to Denver, Colorado due to a bomb hoax inspired by a TV film Doomsday Flight. The aircraft travelled 3,200 miles out of its way to land in Denver. The supposed bomb was thought to be triggered by flying below 5,000 feet. Denver's airport was above 5,000 feet.

== Non-fatal accidents ==
=== 1940s ===
- On 23 May 1940, Armstrong Whitworth Ensign G-ADSZ Elysean stalled and crashed at Merville Airport after the crew diverted to avoid an attack by a German fighter.
- On 14 September 1940, Short Scylla G-ACJJ Scylla was destroyed in a windstorm while parked at RAF Drem, Scotland.
- On 21 September 1940, Douglas DC-3-194B crashed on approach to Heston Airfield in fog; no casualties. The aircraft was operating an air bridge service between RAF Whitchurch, Heston and Lisbon.
- On 6 October 1940, de Havilland Albatross G-AFDL Fingal crashed at Pucklechurch, Gloucestershire while attempting an emergency landing following engine problems; all 12 on board survived. A fuel line ruptured during the approach, causing all four engines to quit.
- On 24 November 1940, Douglas DC-3 G-AGBI and Armstrong Whitworth Ensign II G-ADTC were destroyed on the ground at Whitchurch Airfield during a German daylight bombing raid.
- On 20 December 1940, de Havilland Albatross G-AFDI Frobisher was destroyed on the ground by a German air raid while parked at Whitchurch Airfield.
- On 19 January 1941, Lockheed 14 Super Electra G-AFGR crashed at Al Fashir, Sudan during a charter flight.
- On 15 February 1941, Short Empire G-AFCX Clyde was wrecked in a gale at Lisbon, Portugal.
- On 17 June 1941, de Havilland Express G-ACWC Delia crashed near Minna while attempting an emergency landing; no casualties.
- On 4 August 1941, Lockheed 14-WF62 Super Electra G-AFGP crashed at Khartoum while attempting an emergency landing; no casualties.
- On 21 December 1941, Lockheed 18-08 Lodestar G-AGCZ crashed on landing at Tobruk Airfield; no casualties.
- On 23 May 1942, Lockheed 18-10 Lodestar G-AGCR crashed on takeoff from Luqa Airport; no casualties.
- On 23 June 1942, Lockheed Hudson III G-AGDF ditched in the Gullmarsfjorden off Skredewick, Sweden after one engine failed and the other caught fire; all 10 on board survived.
- On 13 September 1942, de Havilland Flamingo G-AFYI crashed on landing at Adana Airport; no casualties.
- On 18 November 1942, de Havilland Flamingo G-AFYG crashed on takeoff from Lideta Airport, Ethiopia.
- On 16 July 1943, de Havilland Albatross G-AFDK Fortuna lost control and veered off the runway on landing at Shannon Airport; all 14 on board survived.
- On 19 November 1943, Lockheed 10A Electra G-AFCS Lea crashed at Almaza Airport, Egypt; no casualties.
- On 14 April 1944, Lockheed 10A Electra G-AEPR crashed at Almaza Airport.
- On 21 April 1944, Douglas C-47 G-AGFZ was written off following a landing accident at Bromma Airport; the aircraft was sold to AB Aerotransport for spare parts.
- On 28 August 1944, Douglas C-47A G-AGIR crashed in mountainous terrain near Talmest, Morocco.
- On 1 May 1945, Douglas C-47B G-AGNA crashed near Basra, Iraq in a sandstorm; no casualties.
- On 2 May 1945, Lockheed C-60A G-AGLI ditched in the Baltic Sea in Sikeåfjärden off Västerbotten, Sweden after the crew became disorientated; all nine on board survived and were rescued by locals.
- On 23 January 1946, Douglas C-47A G-AGIY crashed on landing at El Adem, Libya; no casualties.
- On 4 March 1946, Short Sunderland III G-AGEV Hailsham crashed off Poole after landing hard; all 20 on board survived.
- On 17 April 1946, Douglas C-47A G-AGHK overran the runway on landing at Oviedo Airport following engine failure; all 13 on board survived.
- On 2 May 1946, Avro Lancastrian I G-AGMC suffered landing gear failure on landing at Sydney; no casualties.
- On 17 May 1946, Avro Lancastrian I G-AGMH landed hard at Mauripur AFB, Pakistan; no casualties.
- On 15 August 1946, Avro Lancastrian I G-AGLU lost control and ran off the runway on takeoff at Bournemouth during a training flight; all four crew survived.
- On 23 December 1946, Douglas C-47B G-AGKD crashed on takeoff from Luqa, Malta; no casualties.
- On 3 January 1947, Douglas DC-3A G-AGJU lost control on landing at Whitchurch AFB; all three crew survived.
- On 9 February 1948, de Havilland Dove 2 G-AJHL crashed in the Ionian Sea off Locri, Italy; all on board were rescued, but the aircraft later sank.
- On 27 August 1948, Avro Lancastrian I G-AGMB overran the runway at Tengah AFB, Singapore following engine problems; all 18 on board survived.
- On 5 September 1948, Short S.25 Sunderland 3 G-AGEW crashed on takeoff at Surabaya. The port float assembly collapsed on takeoff. The aircraft was turned over.
- On 13 November 1948, Consolidated Liberator II G-AHYC suffered landing gear collapse on landing at RAF Heathfield; all nine on board survived.
- On 1 February 1949, Avro York I G-AGJD Mansfield ran off the runway while taking off from Castel Benito Airport, Libya and broke in two; all 15 on board survived. The aircraft was caught by crosswinds during the takeoff roll and the pilot overcorrected.
- On 7 November 1949, Avro Lancastrian I G-AGMM crashed on landing at Castel Benito Airport; no casualties.

=== 1950s ===
- On 1 February 1950, Short Solent G-AHIX crashed on landing and sank off Netley during a test flight after being caught by strong winds; all 11 on board survived.
- On 26 October 1952, Flight 115, Comet 1A G-ALYZ, the first Comet taken into service only the month before, crashed on takeoff at Ciampino Airport, Rome. There were no casualties and Italian investigators concluded pilot error as cause of this crash. The investigators found scrapes on the runway for over 650 yards, combined with the pilot report of not getting speed up after rotation and referencing the BOAC Comet manual which stated: "at 80 knots the nose should be raised until the rumble of the nose-wheel ceases. Care should be taken not to overdo this and adopt an exaggerated tail down attitude with consequent poor acceleration". The conclusion was made: "An error of judgement by the captain in not appreciating the excessive nose up attitude of the Aircraft during take off". All 43 on board survived, but the aircraft was written off, resulting in the first hull-loss of the Comet.
- On 25 July 1953, de Havilland Comet 1 G-ALYR experienced a runway excursion while taxiing at Dum Dum Airport. While taxiing, the crew used the landing lights because the taxi lights were too dim. In a left turn while alternating between the left and right lights, the pilot took his hand off the steering wheel, causing the steering to center. The right side main landing gear left the runway; right side engine power was increased and this caused the landing gear to be forced up into the wing, causing severe damage. All 42 on board survived; the aircraft was written off.
- On 9 December 1955, de Havilland Dove 2 G-ALTM suffered right engine failure while returning from making a movie of Heathrow Airport. The pilot shut down the working, left engine by mistake and the aircraft stalled and crashed short of the runway; all three on board survived.
- On 22 April 1956, Avro York C.1 G-AGNS suffered a ground accident while taxiing at Idris Airport; no casualties.

=== 1960s ===
- On 14 March 1960, de Havilland Comet 4 G-APDS struck a ridge while on approach to Barajas Airport, tearing off the landing gear wheels and port side wing fuel tank and damaging the port wing flaps. The pilot abandoned the approach and performed an emergency landing with the damaged gear down. All 32 on board survived and the aircraft was repaired and returned to service. The aircraft was flying too low during the approach.
- On 22 August 1960, de Havilland Comet 4 G-APDB took off from a runway at Cairo International Airport that was under construction. The port side main landing gear fell into a hole, breaking off the axles and wheels; all 60 on board survived and the aircraft was repaired and returned to service.
- On 11 November 1960, Bristol Britannia 102 G-ANBC landed wheels-up at Khartoum due to hydraulic system failure; all 27 on board survived. The support member for the starboard main gear allowed the gear to fall, damaging hydraulic system lines.
- On 24 December 1960, Boeing 707-436 G-APFN overran the runway on landing at Heathrow Airport; all 106 on board survived and the aircraft was repaired and returned to service. The aircraft had come in too fast and landed too far down the runway as a result.
- On 9 March 1964, de Havilland Comet 4 G-APDN suffered a tailstrike while landing at Mehrabad Airport, damaging the underside of the fuselage and control of the elevators was lost, but the aircraft continued the landing without further incident. All 57 on board survived.

== In popular culture ==
It is referenced in the James Tiptree Jr. story "The Last Flight of Dr. Ain."

Multiple references throughout the Netflix TV Series The Crown.

BOAC is mentioned in the opening lyrics of The Beatles' opening song for White Album, Back in the U.S.S.R..

== See also ==
- Aviation in the United Kingdom
- List of defunct airlines of the United Kingdom
- History of British Airways
- British Caledonian

== Bibliography ==
- Cooper, Barbara, ed. B.O.A.C Book of Flight. London: Max Parrish, 1959.
- Henderson, S. Pictorial history of BOAC and associated airlines. Scoval Publ. Newcastle-upon-Tyne.
- Higham, Robin. Speedbird: The Complete History of BOAC. London: I.B. Tauris, distributed by Palgrave Macmillan, 2013. 491-page scholarly history. ISBN 978-1-78076-462-7.
- Jackson, A.J. Avro Aircraft since 1908. London: Putnam Aeronautical Books, 1990. ISBN 0-85177-834-8.
- Jones, D. The time shrinkers. London. Beaumont Aviation Literature. 1977.
- Munson, Kenneth. Pictorial History of BOAC and Imperial Airways. London: Ian Allan, 1970. ISBN 0-7110-0136-7.
- Penrose, Harald. Wings Across the World: An Illustrated History of British Airways. London: Cassell, 1980 ISBN 0-304-30697-5.
- Pudney, John. The Seven Skies: A Study of B.O.A.C. and its Forerunners Since 1919. Putnam, London, 1959.
- Scholefield, R. A. (1998). Manchester Airport. Stroud: Sutton. ISBN 0-7509-1954-X.
- Taylor, H. A. "Tony" (April–July 1982). "Stratocruiser... Ending an Airline Era". Air Enthusiast. No. 18. pp. 37–53. ISSN 0143-5450.
- Turner-Hughes, Charles. "Armstrong Whitworth's Willing Whitley". Air Enthusiast, No. 9, February–May 1979, pp. 10–25. ISSN 0143-5450.
- Woodley, Charles. BOAC: An Illustrated History. Stroud, England: Tempus, 2004. ISBN 0-7524-3161-7.
- Woods, E. From flying boats to flying jets. Airlife. 2002.
