= BOAC Flight 781 =

1954 aviation accident in the Mediterranean Sea

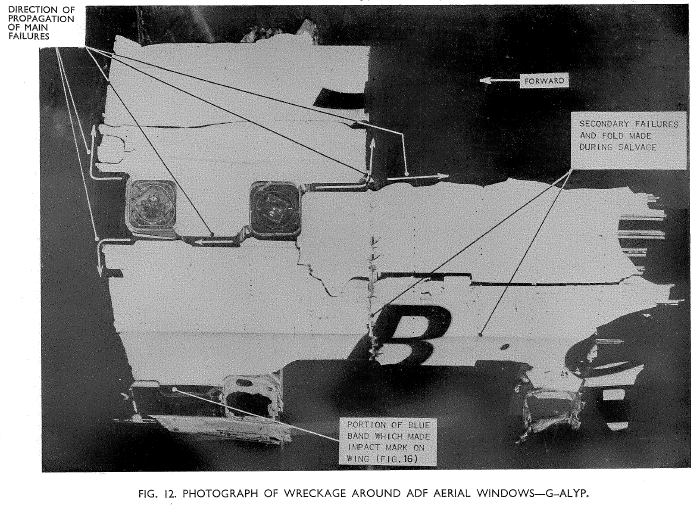
- A piece of aircraft wreckage recovered from the Mediterranean Sea

Accident
- Date: 10 January 1954
- Summary: In-flight metal fatigue failure leading to explosive decompression and mid-air disintegration
- Site: Mediterranean Sea off Elba; 42°40′42″N 10°25′38″E

Aircraft
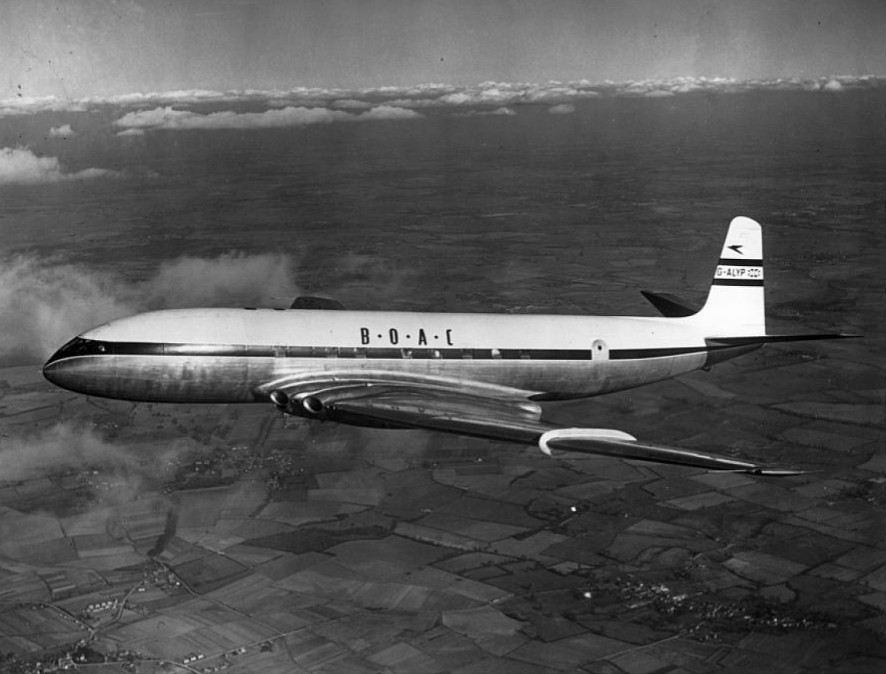
- G-ALYP, the aircraft involved in the accident, seen with a previous livery
- Aircraft type: de Havilland DH-106 Comet 1
- Operator: British Overseas Airways Corporation
- IATA flight No.: BA781
- ICAO flight No.: BOA781
- Call sign: SPEEDBIRD 781
- Registration: G-ALYP
- Flight origin: Kallang Airport, Singapore
- 1st stopover: Bangkok International Airport (now Don Mueang Airport), Bangkok, Thailand
- 2nd stopover: Rangoon Airport, Rangoon, Burma
- 3rd stopover: Dum Dum Airport, Calcutta, India
- 4th stopover: Jinnah Airport, Karachi, Pakistan
- 5th stopover: Bahrain Airport, Muharraq, Bahrain
- 6th stopover: Beirut Airport, Beirut, Lebanon
- Last stopover: Ciampino Airport, Rome, Italy
- Destination: London Heathrow Airport, London, England
- Occupants: 35
- Passengers: 29
- Crew: 6
- Fatalities: 35
- Survivors: 0

BOAC Flight 781 was a scheduled British Overseas Airways Corporation passenger flight from Singapore to London. On 10 January 1954, a de Havilland Comet passenger jet operating the flight suffered an explosive decompression at altitude and crashed, killing all 35 people on board.

The aircraft, registered G-ALYP, had taken off shortly before from Ciampino Airport in Rome, en route to Heathrow Airport in London, on the final leg of its flight from Singapore. After it exploded, the debris from the explosion fell into the sea near the island of Elba, off the Italian coast.

G-ALYP was the third Comet built. Its loss marked the second in a series of three fatal accidents involving the Comet in less than twelve months, all caused by structural failures; it followed the crash of BOAC Flight 783 near Calcutta, India, in May 1953, and was followed by the loss of South African Airways Flight 201 in April 1954, which crashed in circumstances similar to 781 after departing from Ciampino Airport.

== Crew and passengers ==
Flight 781 was commanded by Captain Alan Gibson DFC, age 31, one of BOAC's youngest pilots. He had joined BOAC in 1946, after flying in the Royal Air Force during World War II. He had considerable flying experience, having logged more than 6,500 flight hours. He had previously been involved in an accident in 1951, in which a Hermes aircraft was forced to make an emergency landing, and he was later praised for his flying conduct during this accident flight.

The first officer on Flight 781 was William John Bury, age 33. He had flown a total of approximately 4,900 hours. The second officer was Francis Charles Macdonald, age 27, and the radio operator was Luke Patrick McMahon, age 32. They had logged 720 flying hours and close to 3,600 flying hours, respectively.

Ten of the twenty-nine passengers were children. Many of them were students of schools in the United Kingdom and had visited their families that had been residing in Asia. Three employees of BOAC and one employee of British European Airways were passengers on the accident segment. Additionally, six passengers were related to BOAC employees. Among the casualties were Chester Wilmot, a prominent Australian journalist and military historian working for the BBC, and Dorothy Beecher Baker, a Hand of the Cause of God for the Baháʼí Faith. Wilmot first joined the flight in Rangoon, and Baker first joined the flight in Karachi.

== Flight and accident ==
On the day of the accident, the Comet went through its routine preflight inspection in Rome, and was checked for "incidental damage"; none was found. The aircraft was therefore released to service. The same team of engineers a few months later examined South African Airways Flight 201 before its final flight.

Flight 781 departed from Rome at 10:31 CET (09:31 UTC) on 10 January 1954, on the final stage of its flight to London. At about 10:50 CEST, a BOAC Argonaut, registration G-ALHJ, piloted by Captain Johnson, which was flying the same route at a lower altitude, was in contact with Captain Gibson. During a radio communication about weather conditions, the conversation was abruptly cut off. The last words heard from Gibson were "George How Jig, from George Yoke Peter, did you get my—". Soon afterwards, witnesses saw wreckage falling into the sea.

Heathrow Airport initially listed Flight 781 as being delayed, but it was removed from the arrivals board at around 1:30 pm.

== Search and recovery ==
In its issue dated 11 January 1954, The New York Times published a report stating that a British Comet jet airliner had plunged into the sea near the western coast of Italy, specifically between the islands of Elba and Montecristo. As per the report, it was strongly suspected that the tragic incident had claimed the lives of 35 people. Extensive recovery operations were carried out overnight, yet despite thorough searches in the frigid waters, prospects of finding any survivors were bleak.

The task of finding out what had happened to Flight 781 was difficult at first because the accident had occurred over water. In 1954, there were no cockpit voice recorders or flight data recorders (the so-called "black boxes") to assist crash investigators, and there existed no established protocol for aircraft accident investigation at the time.

An extensive search for the aircraft was organised, which included the Royal Navy ships HMS Barhill and HMS Gambia as well as the Maltese civilian salvage vessel Sea Salvor. The search effort involved the pioneering use of underwater TV cameras, developed by a team at the UK Admiralty Research Laboratory led by George MacNeice, to help to locate and salvage the wreckage in deep water. The wreckage was returned to the United Kingdom by RFA Fort Beauharnois.

Witnesses to the crash were a group of Italian fishermen who rushed to the scene to recover the bodies and to search for possible survivors, of whom there were none. The aircraft wreckage was eventually found on the sea floor; it was subsequently raised and transported to the Royal Aircraft Establishment (RAE) for investigation.

== Initial findings and reaction ==
To find more evidence concerning the cause of the crash, the bodies were brought to the coroner for post-mortem. During the examination, pathologist Antonio Fornari found broken and damaged limbs, which had apparently occurred after death. He also discovered in most of the victims a distinct pattern of injuries, consisting of fractured skulls and ruptured and otherwise damaged lungs, which he identified as the actual cause of death. Fornari was confused by the pattern of injuries because he could find no evidence of an explosion.

The ruptured lungs were a sure indicator that the air cabin had depressurised, because the sudden decrease in pressure would have caused the lungs to expand until they ruptured. To support this theory, and also to confirm the cause of the skull fractures, the crash was simulated at the RAE in Farnborough by reproducing the conditions of the actual plane prior to the crash. To make this possible, a model fuselage was constructed that was similar to that of the Comet. Dummies were seated within the fuselage to replicate the possible movements of the passengers during the crash.

In order to simulate the crash, the investigators deliberately ruptured the model fuselage by increasing the air pressure inside until it exploded. The movement of the dummies within the air cabin revealed the cause of the skull fractures: at the moment that the fuselage exploded, they were thrown out of their seats and slammed head-first into the ceiling.

Upon examination of the aircraft wreckage by the RAE, it became evident that the aircraft had broken up in mid-air, and there was initially some speculation that the aircraft might have been brought down by a bomb. Suspicion then shifted to the possibility of an engine turbine explosion, and modifications were instigated in other Comets, where the turbine ring was encased with armour plate to contain a possible disintegration of the turbine disk. The possibility of failure of the pressure cabin was also considered, but this theory was discounted because the Comet's cabin had been designed to a considerably higher strength than was considered necessary at the time.

In the meantime, all Comets were to be grounded until the turbine modifications had been carried out. The New York Times reported on 12 January that BOAC had temporarily withdrawn all of their de Havilland Comet jet airliners from service, as a result of the crash, and that the two French airlines that used the Comet—Air France and Union Aero Maritime des Transports—had also suspended their Comet services. BOAC had confirmed that their Comet routes would be flown with alternative aircraft to minimise the disruption to the service schedule. The airline emphasized that the planes had not been officially grounded by the British government, but that the action was being taken as "a measure of prudence to enable a minute and unhurried technical examination of every aircraft in the Comet fleet to be carried out at maintenance headquarters at London airport."

While the official investigation efforts began, BOAC were determined to return their Comets to passenger service as soon as possible, and succeeded in doing so on 23 March, just ten weeks after the crash. BOAC's chairman commented on television, "We obviously wouldn't be flying the Comet with passengers if we weren't satisfied conditions were suitable." However, a second BOAC de Havilland Comet, registered G-ALYY, was lost on 8 April 1954: a charter flight, operating as South African Airways Flight 201, departed from Rome bound for Egypt with fourteen passengers and seven crew on board; thirty-three minutes into the flight the pilot reported on course flying at 10,000 metres, then all contact was lost.

Sir Arnold Hall, a Cambridge University scholar and scientist and then-head of the RAE, was appointed as the head accident investigator.

== Original investigation ==
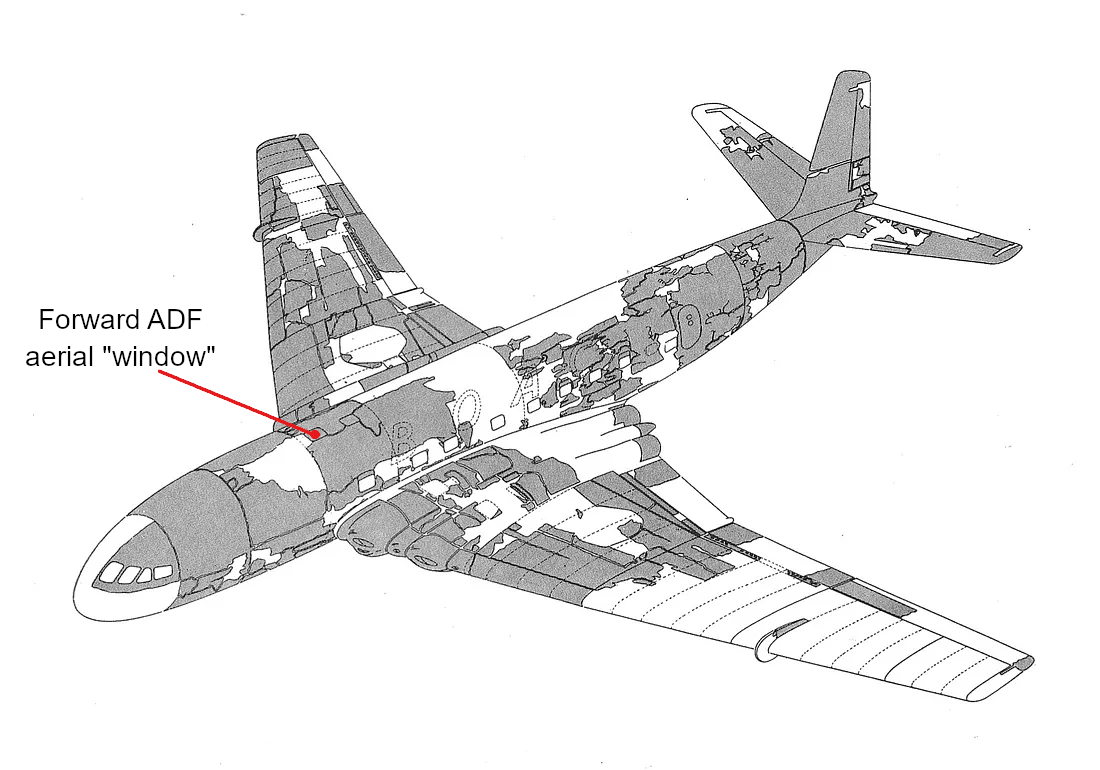
The recovered (shaded) parts of the wreckage of G-ALYP and the site (arrowed) of the failure

Initial examination and reconstruction of the wreckage of G-ALYP revealed several signs of inflight break-up:

- Shreds of cabin carpet were found trapped in the remains of the Comet's tail section.
- The imprint of a coin was found on a fuselage panel from the rear of the aircraft.
- Smears and scoring on the rear fuselage were tested and found to be consistent to the paint applied to the passenger seats of the Comet.

With most of the wreckage recovered, investigators found that fractures started in the roof of the cabin, a window then smashed into the elevators, the rear fuselage then tore away, the outer wing structure fell, then the outer wing tips and finally the cockpit broke away, and fuel from the wings set the debris on fire.

To find out what caused the first failure, BOAC donated G-ALYU ("Yoke Uncle") for testing. The airframe was put in a large water tank, the tank was filled, and water was pumped into the plane to simulate flight conditions. The experiment was run 24 hours per day, 7 days per week. It could possibly have taken as long as five months.

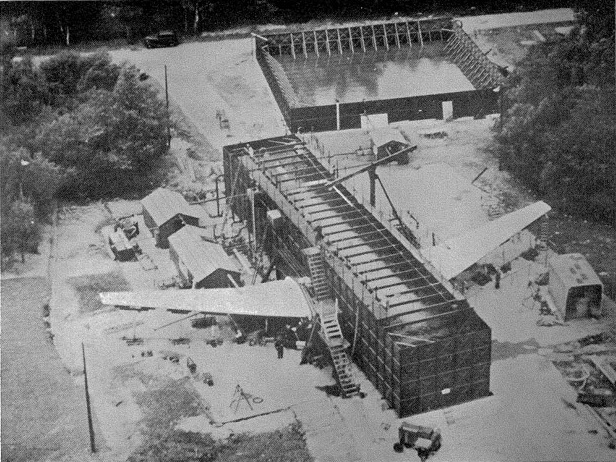
G-ALYU in the water tank for pressure tests

Official findings concerning BOAC Flight 781 and South African Airways Flight 201 were released jointly on 1 February 1955, in Civil Aircraft Accident: Report of the Court of Inquiry into the Accidents to Comet G-ALYP on 10 January 1954 and Comet G-ALYY on 8 April 1954. After the equivalent of 3,000 flights simulated with G-ALYU, investigators at the RAE concluded that the crash of G-ALYP had been due to failure of the pressure cabin at the forward ADF window in the roof. This window was one of two apertures for the aerials of an electronic navigation system in which opaque fibreglass panels took the place of the window glass. The failure was a result of metal fatigue caused by the repeated pressurisation and de-pressurisation of the aircraft cabin. Another fact was that the supports around the windows were riveted, not glued, as the original specifications for the aircraft had called for. The problem was exacerbated by the punch rivet construction technique employed. Unlike drill riveting, the imperfect nature of the hole created by punch riveting caused manufacturing defect cracks, which may have caused fatigue cracks to start around the rivet. The investigators examined the final piece of wreckage with a microscope.

== Effects of the disaster and findings ==
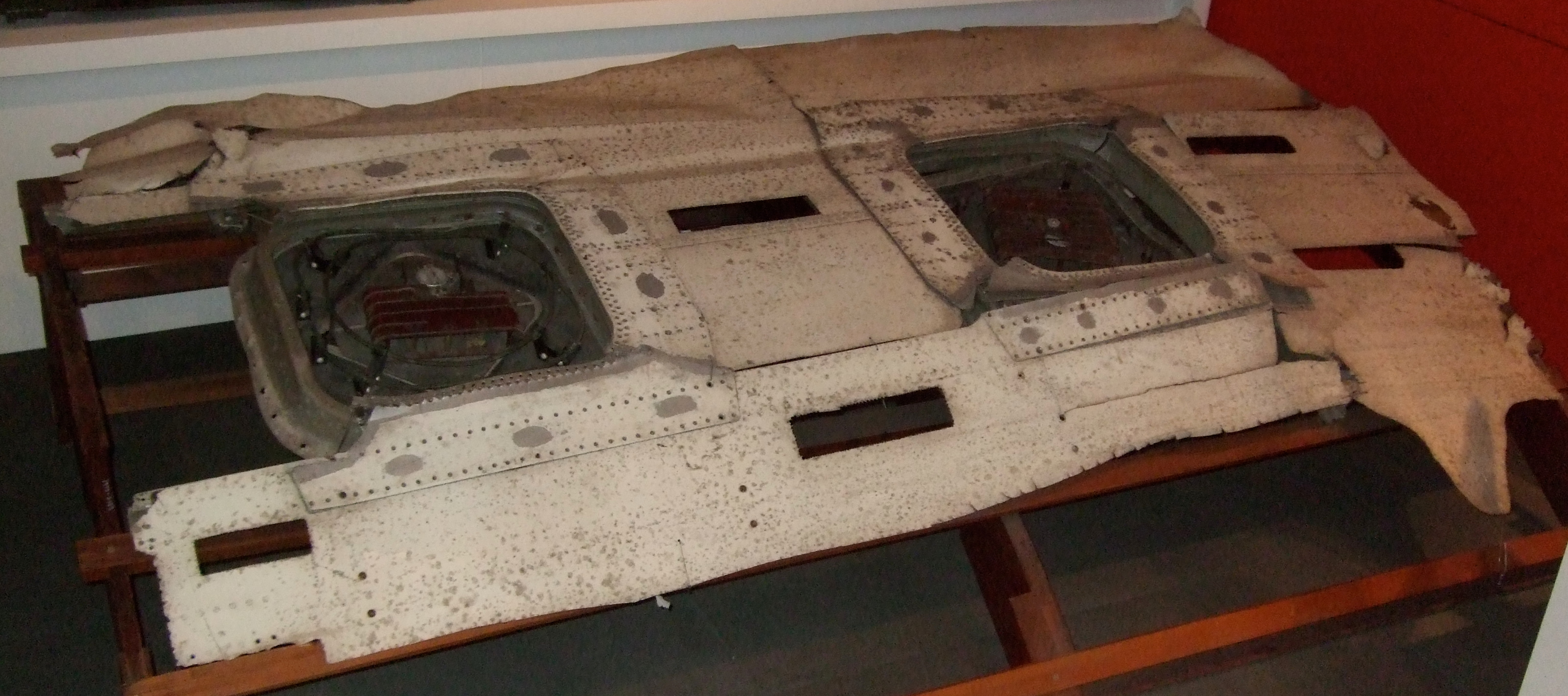
Fuselage fragment of the aircraft on display at the Science Museum in London

The Comet's pressure cabin had been designed to a safety factor comfortably in excess of that required by British Civil Airworthiness Requirements (BCAR)—the requirement was 1.33 times P with an ultimate load of 2 times P (where P is the cabin's "Proof" pressure), but the safety factor used in the Comet was 2.5 times P—hence the accident led to revised estimates for the safe loading strength requirements of airliner pressure cabins.

== Memorial ==
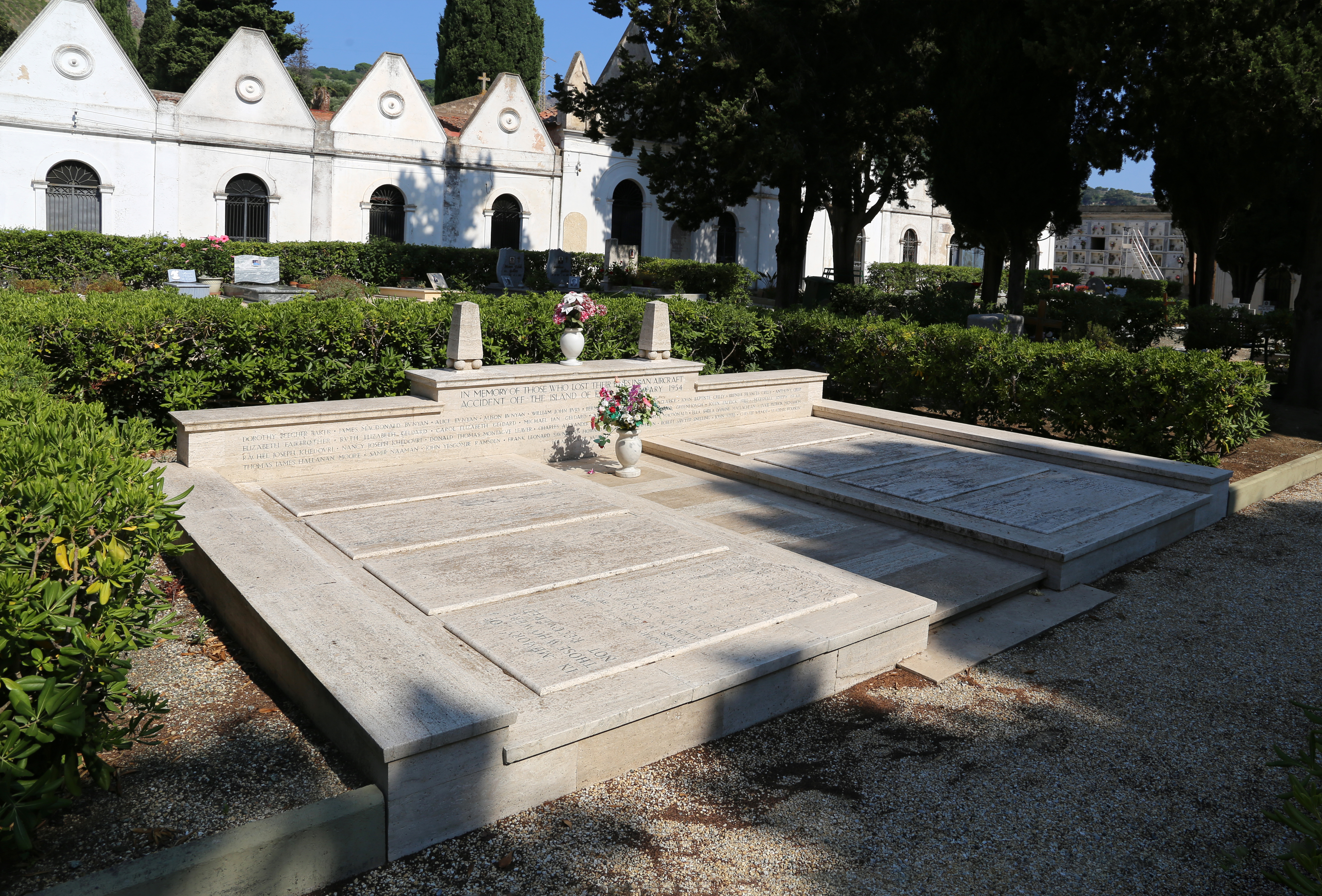
Memorial in Porto Azzurro

There is a memorial in the cemetery of Porto Azzurro, where some of the victims are buried and with a list of those (20) whose remains were never found.

== In popular culture ==
This accident was featured on National Geographic's Seconds from Disaster, "Comet Air Crash". Seemingly prescient was the 1951 film No Highway in the Sky starring James Stewart, which also dealt with aircraft structural fatigue.

== See also ==
- List of accidents and incidents involving commercial aircraft
- List of notable decompression accidents and incidents

== Publications ==
- Official Report (1955), Report of the Public Inquiry into the causes and circumstances of the accident which occurred on the 10th January, 1954, to the Comet aircraft G-ALYP.
- Stewart, Stanley (1986/89). Air Disasters. Arrow Books (UK). ISBN 0-09-956200-6.
- Baker, Elaine (2020) Another Place Another Time. Golden Age Publishers. ISBN 978-1-8382756-2-4
