= South African Airways Flight 201 =

1954 aviation accident in the Mediterranean Sea

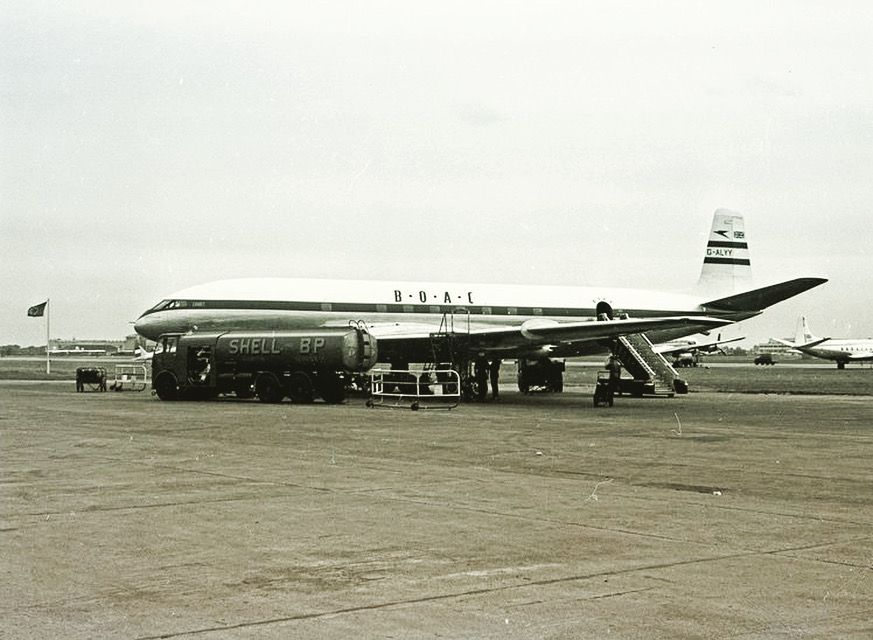
- G-ALYY, the aircraft involved in the accident

Accident
- Date: 8 April 1954
- Summary: In-flight metal fatigue failure leading to explosive decompression and in-flight breakup
- Site: Mediterranean Sea between Naples and Stromboli; 39°55′N 14°30′E

Aircraft
- Aircraft type: de Havilland Comet 1
- Operator: South African Airways on behalf of British Overseas Airways Corporation
- IATA flight No.: SA201
- ICAO flight No.: SAA201
- Call sign: SPRINGBOK 201
- Registration: G-ALYY
- Flight origin: London Heathrow Airport, London, England
- 1st stopover: Rome Ciampino Airport, Rome, Italy
- Last stopover: Cairo International Airport, Cairo, Egypt
- Destination: Johannesburg Jan Smuts Airport, Johannesburg, South Africa
- Passengers: 14
- Crew: 7
- Fatalities: 21
- Survivors: 0

South African Airways Flight 201, a de Havilland Comet 1, took off at 18:32 UTC on 8 April 1954 from Ciampino Airport in Rome, Italy, en route to Cairo, Egypt, on the second stage of its flight from London, England to Johannesburg, South Africa. The flight crashed at around 19:07 UTC, killing all on board. The flight was operated as a charter by British Overseas Airways Corporation (BOAC) using the aircraft registration G-ALYY ("Yoke Yoke"), with a South African crew of seven, and carrying fourteen passengers.

== Flight and disaster ==
Gerry Bull and other BOAC engineers had examined the aircraft for Flight 201. Previously, on 10 January 1954, the same team had undertaken a preflight inspection of BOAC Flight 781, a Comet that had broken up at altitude. It suffered an explosive decompression and all 35 people on board were killed.

Flight 201 took off from London for Rome at 13:00 UTC on Wednesday 7 April 1954, on the first leg southward to Johannesburg, arriving at Rome approximately two and a half hours later, at 17:35 UTC. On arrival at Rome, engineers discovered some minor faults, including a faulty fuel gauge and 30 loose bolts on the left wing, which delayed the aircraft's departure by 25 hours before Yoke Yoke was ready to depart for Cairo on the evening of Thursday 8 April.

The aircraft took off for Cairo at 18:32 UTC under the command of Captain William Mostert, and climbed rapidly toward its cruising height of 11,000 m (35,000 ft). The crew reported over the Ostia beacon at 18:37 UTC, passing through the altitude of 2,100 m (7,000 ft). The weather was good, but with an overcast sky.

Another report was made from the aircraft, first at 18:49 UTC at Ponza, where it reported climbing through 3,500 m (11,600 ft) and another at 18:57 UTC when it reported passing abeam of Naples. At 19:07 UTC, while still climbing, the aircraft contacted Cairo on the long range HF radio and reported an ETA of 21:02 UTC.

This was the last message heard from Yoke Yoke as some time later, the aircraft disintegrated at around 11,000 m (35,000 ft), killing everyone on board.

After repeated attempts at regaining contact by both Cairo and Rome air traffic control were made and went unanswered, it was realised that another Comet had been lost. Initial news of the accident was leaked to the press by a German radio station which had been monitoring the radio transmissions.

The New York Times wrote that:

Britain today weighed the cost of a stunning blow to her proudest pioneer industry – jet civil aviation – as the crash of another Comet airliner was confirmed. Twenty-one persons, including three Americans, were believed to have died when the plane was lost in the Mediterranean. The discovery of at least six bodies and bits of wreckage floating in the sea about 70 miles [110 km] south of Naples put a pall on the last hopes for the British Overseas Airways Corporation craft, missing since 6:57 o'clock last night.

Tonight the Minister of Transport, A. T. Lennox-Boyd withdrew from all Comets the certificate of airworthiness that the aircraft won on 20 January 1952, 'pending further detailed investigations into the causes of the recent disasters.

This second, unexplained Comet crash in three months came less than three weeks after the sleek four-jet de Havilland airliner had been restored to commercial service with about 60 safety modifications. They had been grounded for 10 weeks since the previous Comet crash 10 Jan into the Mediterranean near the island of Elba with 35 dead.

Early today they were grounded again. Sir Miles Thomas, chairman of the airline, said the new crash was 'a very great tragedy and a major setback for British civil aviation.

Bull said he found it difficult to accept the fact that the circumstances surrounding the crash of BOAC flight 781 three months earlier had occurred again with the South African Airways flight.

== Search and recovery ==
Approximate location of the accident near Italy

As soon as it heard of the crash, BOAC once again voluntarily grounded all of its Comets as it had done three months earlier after the BOAC Flight 781 disaster. The Italian air-sea rescue services were notified, and searching began at dawn the next day, subsequently involving the Royal Navy carrier HMS Eagle and the destroyer HMS Daring. Some time later that day, a report was received from a BEA Ambassador aircraft of an oil patch and bodies and wreckage in the water. The depth of the Mediterranean Sea at the crash site meant that a salvage mission was ruled out as impractical, but if the cause of the BOAC crash was found, it would also explain the SA crash due to the close similarities of the two.

== Official investigation ==
At the time of the accident, the investigation into the crash of BOAC Flight 781 was still in progress, but suspicion of the cause of the crash had fallen on the possibility of an engine turbine failure. During the previous grounding of all Comets, modifications had been made to the aircraft, including Yoke Yoke, that seemed to eliminate this possibility.

After an extensive multi-year investigation chaired by Lionel Cohen, Baron Cohen, the official document of findings was released by the Ministry of Transport and Civil Aviation, on 1 February 1955, as Civil Aircraft Accident Report of the Court of Inquiry into the Accidents to Comet G-ALYP on 10 January 1954 and Comet G-ALYY on 8 April 1954.

The joint investigation of this accident, and of BOAC 781, revealed manufacturer design defects and metal fatigue that resulted ultimately in the explosive decompression that caused both accidents.

== In popular culture ==
The events of Flight 201 were included in "Ripped Apart", a Season 6 (2007) episode of the Canadian TV series Mayday (called Air Emergency and Air Disasters in the U.S. and Air Crash Investigation in the UK and elsewhere around the world). This special episode examined aviation emergencies that were caused by pressurisation failure or explosive decompression; the episode also featured BOAC Flight 781.

== See also ==
- List of accidents and incidents involving commercial aircraft
- List of notable decompression accidents and incidents
- List of structural failures and collapses
- National Geographic Seconds From Disaster episodes
