= Rome Ciampino Airport =

Secondary airport serving Rome, Italy

Rome Ciampino G. B. Pastine Airport Aeroporto internazionale di Roma-Ciampino "G. B. Pastine"

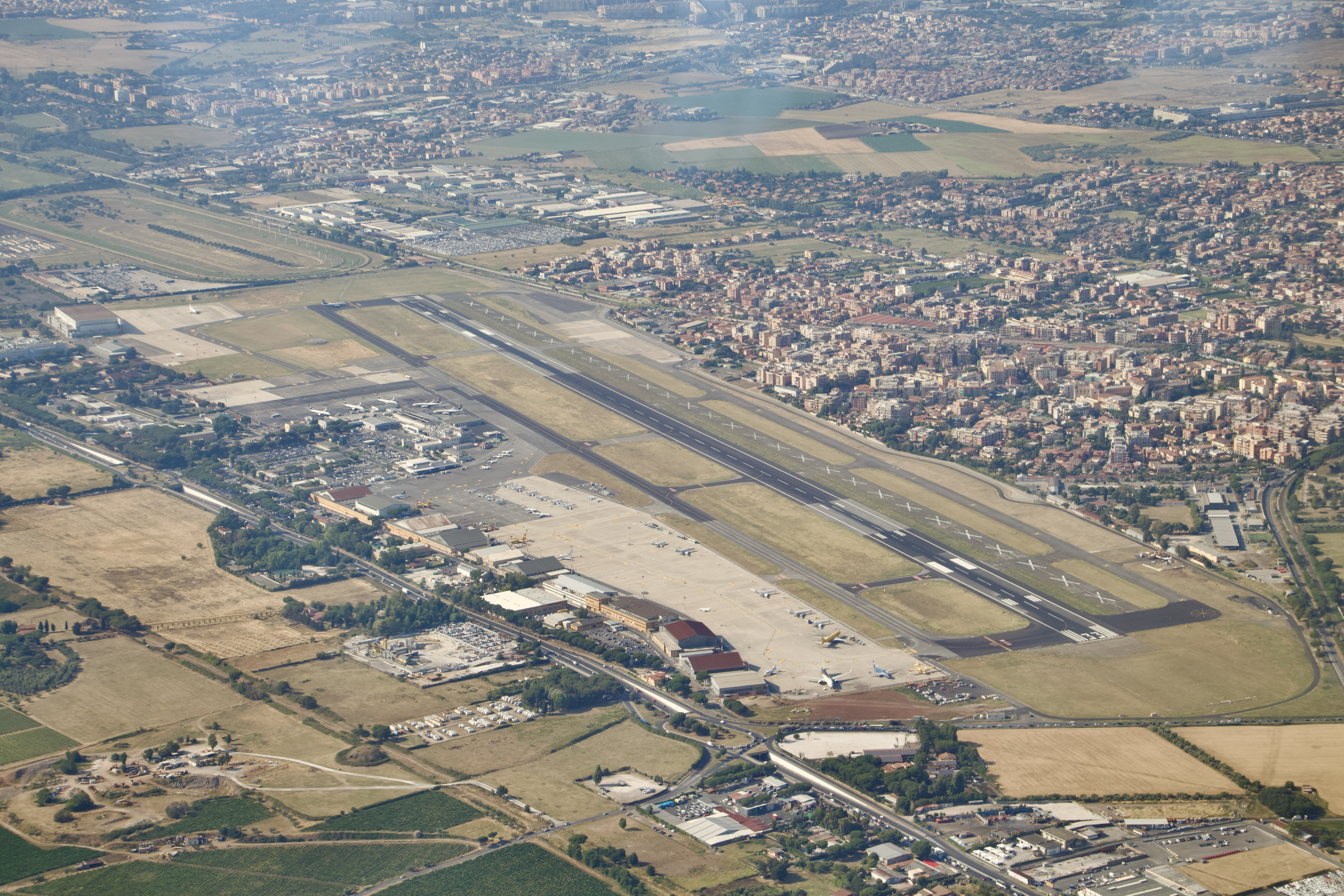
- IATA: CIA; ICAO: LIRA

Summary
- Airport type: Public/Military
- Owner: Mundys
- Operator: Aeroporti di Roma
- Serves: Ciampino; Rome; Lazio region Vatican City
- Location: Ciampino, Lazio, Italy
- Opened: 1916
- Operating base for: Ryanair
- Time zone: CET (UTC+01:00)
  - Summer (DST): CEST (UTC+02:00)
- Elevation AMSL: 427 ft (130 m)
- Coordinates: 41°47′58″N 012°35′50″E
- Website: www.adr.it/web/aeroporti-di-roma-en/pax-cia-ciampino/

Map
- Location of airport in Italy CIA/LIRA (Lazio) CIA/LIRA (Italy)

Runways
Direction	Length		Surface
Direction	m	ft	Surface
15/33	2,208	7,244	Bitumen

Statistics (2024)
- Passengers: 3,861,806
- Passenger change 23-24: ▼ -0.6%
- Movements: 42,429
- Movements change 23-24: ▼ -0.7%
- Cargo (tons): 14,536
- Cargo change 23-24: ▲4.5%
- Source: Italian AIP at EUROCONTROL; Statistics from Assaeroporti

Rome Ciampino G. B. Pastine Airport (IATA: CIA, ICAO: LIRA) (Italian: Aeroporto internazionale di Roma-Ciampino "G. B. Pastine") is Rome's secondary international airport serving Rome, its metropolitan area, Vatican City, and the wider Lazio region. It is Rome's second international airport after Leonardo da Vinci–Rome Fiumicino Airport. It is a joint civilian, commercial and military airport situated 6.5 NM (12.0 km; 7.5 mi) south southeast of central Rome, just outside the Greater Ring Road (Italian: Grande Raccordo Anulare or GRA), the circular motorway around the city.

The airport is a base for two low-cost carriers and general aviation traffic. It also hosts a military airport and the headquarters of the 31º Stormo and the 2nd Reparto Genio of the Italian Air Force. The airport is named after Giovan Battista Pastine, an Italian airship pilot who served in World War I.

== History ==
Ciampino Airport was opened in 1916 and is one of the oldest airports still in operation.

From here, on 10 April 1926, Umberto Nobile took off on the airship Norge, the first aircraft to reach the North Pole and the first to fly across the polar ice cap from Europe to America. In October 1930, the first helicopter prototype designed by Corradino D'Ascanio was tested at Ciampino Airport, reaching a record altitude of 18 m (59 ft), flight time of 8 minutes 45 seconds and 1,078 m (3,537 ft) distance flown.

During World War II, the airport was captured by Allied forces in June 1944, and afterward became a United States Army Air Forces military airfield. Although primarily used as a transport base by C-47 Skytrain aircraft of the 64th Troop Carrier Group, the Twelfth Air Force 86th Bombardment Group flew A-36 Apache combat aircraft from the airport during the immediate period after its capture from German forces.

When the combat units moved out, Air Transport Command used the airport as a major transshipment hub for cargo, transiting aircraft and personnel for the remainder of the war.

It was Rome's main airport until 1960, with traffic amounting to over 2 million passengers per year. After the opening of Leonardo da Vinci–Fiumicino Airport, Ciampino handled almost exclusively charter and executive flights for more than three decades. However, the terminal facilities were extended at the beginning of 2007 to accommodate the growing number of low-cost carrier operations.

== Facilities ==
=== Passenger terminal ===
The airport features a single, one-story passenger terminal building containing the departures and arrivals facilities. The departures area consists of a main hall with some stores and service facilities as well as 31 check-in counters and 16 departure gates using walk or bus boarding as there are no jet-bridges. The arrivals area has a separate entrance and features four baggage belts as well as some more service counters.

=== Other usage ===
The airport hosts a fleet of Bombardier 415 aerial firefighting aircraft. It is also used by express logistics companies such as DHL, by official flights of the Italian Government and by planes of dignitaries visiting the Italian capital. There is also an additional smaller general aviation terminal, although private flights have now mainly been transferred to Rome Urbe Airport.

== Airlines and destinations ==
The following passenger airlines operate regular scheduled and charter flights to and from Ciampino Airport:

Airlines	Destinations
Ryanair	Bratislava, Bucharest–Otopeni, Budapest, Cagliari, Charleroi, Edinburgh, Fez, Kraków, London–Stansted, Manchester, Marrakesh, Poznan, Prague, Rabat, Shannon, Sofia, Tirana, Vilnius, Warsaw–Modlin; Seasonal: Amman–Queen Alia, Corfu, East Midlands, Liverpool, Paphos, Rhodes

== Statistics ==
After decades of stagnation in scheduled traffic, low-cost carriers have boosted Ciampino from the year 2002 onwards.

Number of passengers in millions

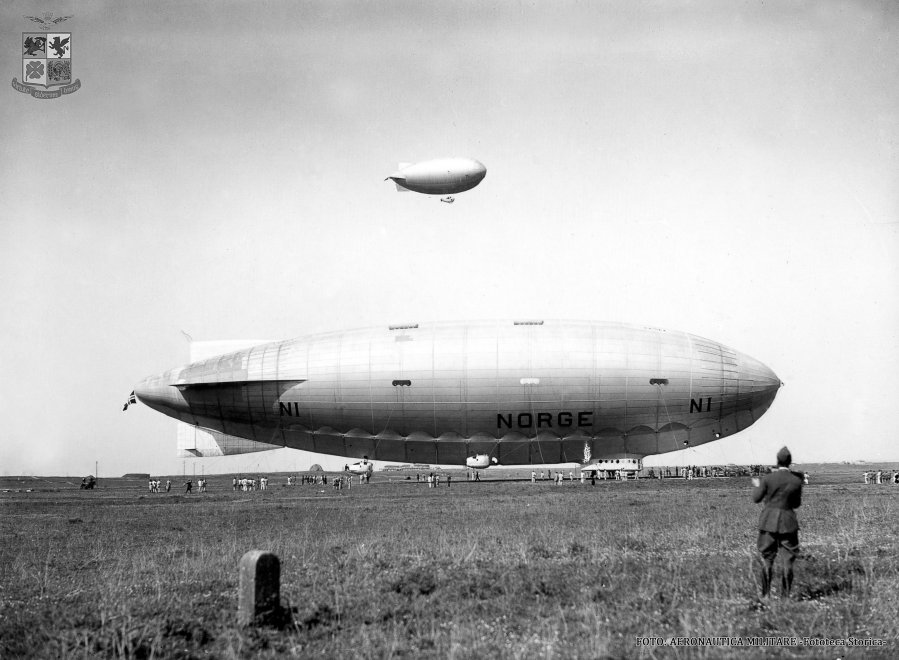
Norge airship taking off from Ciampino Airport

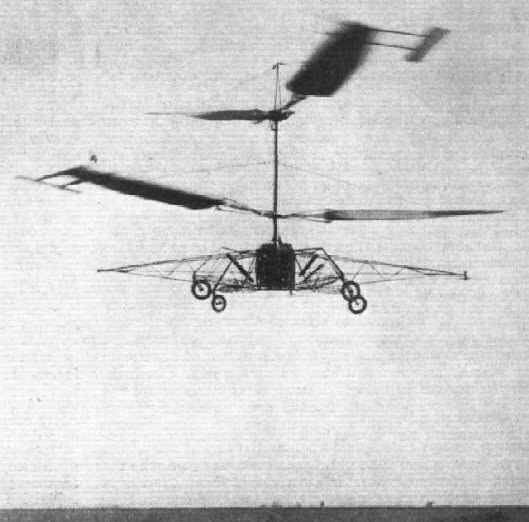
First helicopter flight in Ciampino

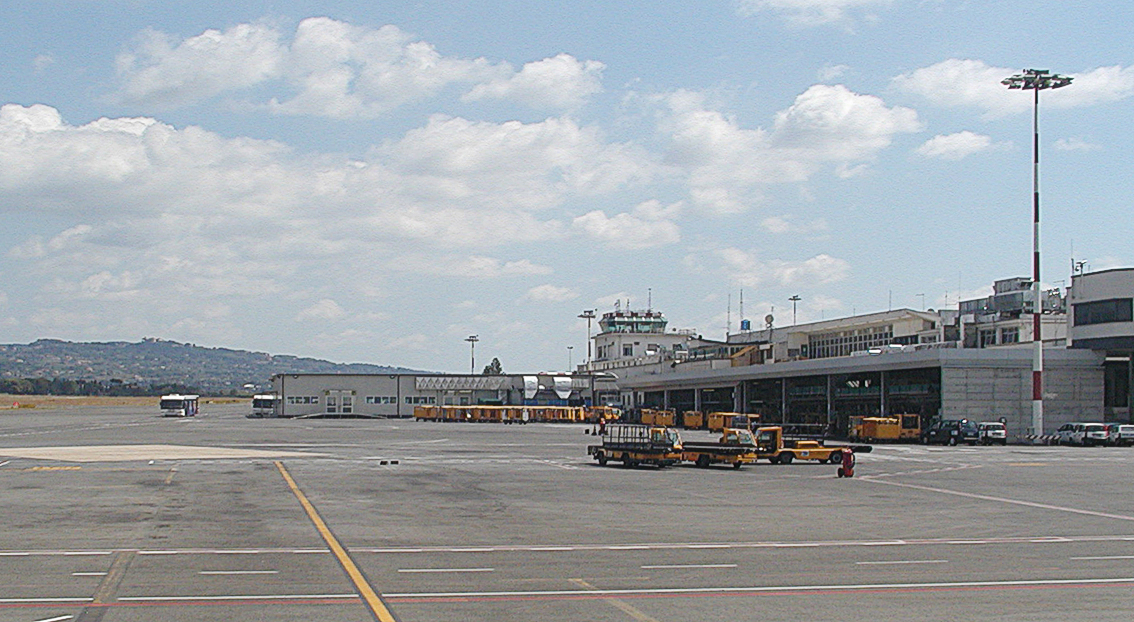
Apron view

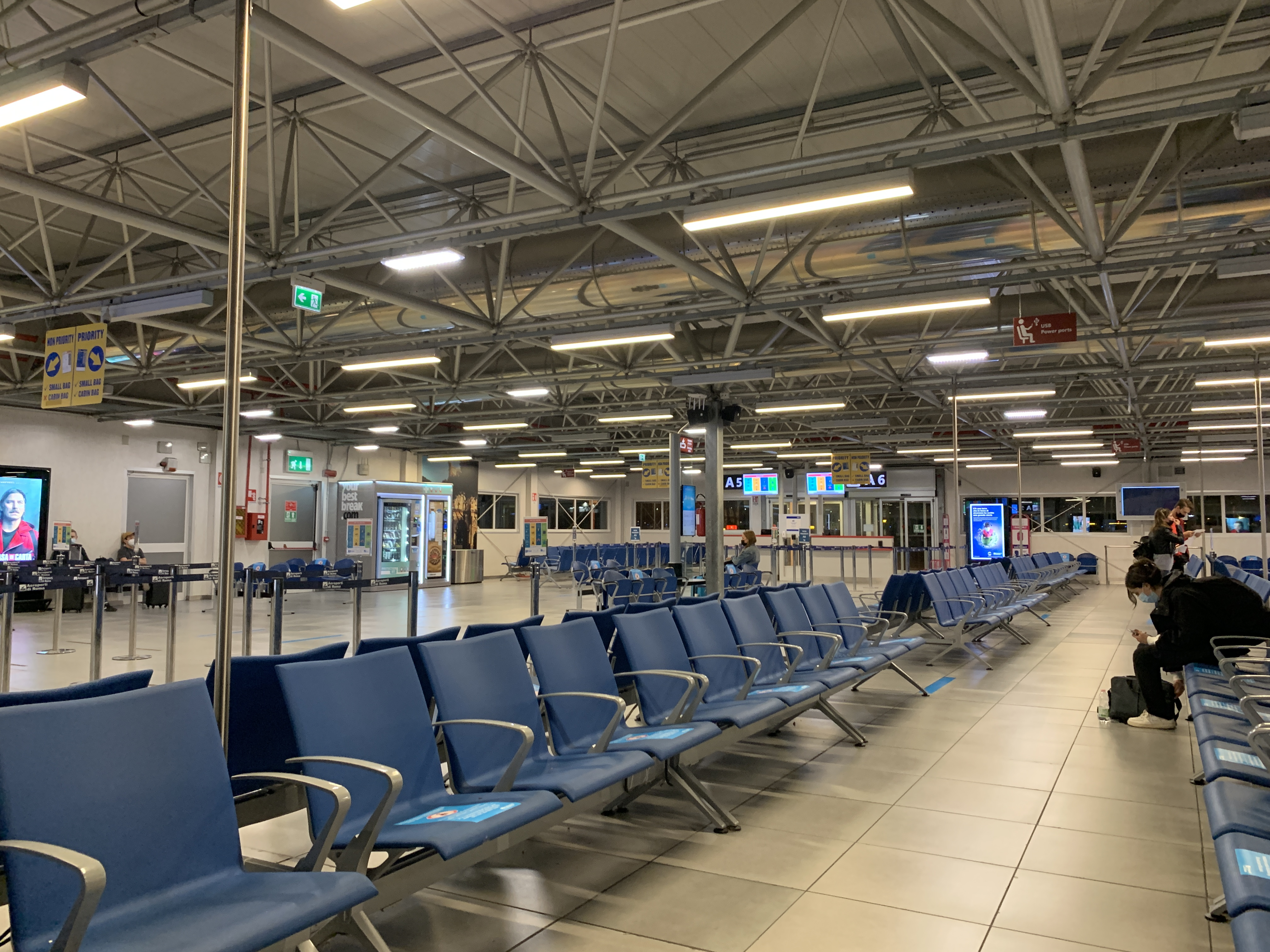
Departure gate area

== Accidents and incidents ==
- Defects in the design of the de Havilland Comet jet airliner were discovered as the result of inflight breakups on two Comets that departed from Ciampino:
  - On 10 January 1954, BOAC Flight 781, a de Havilland Comet, broke up in mid air and crashed into the Mediterranean twenty minutes after takeoff from Ciampino Airport, en route to London Heathrow Airport.
  - On 8 April 1954, two weeks after Comets were allowed to resume flying following a temporary grounding resulting from the previous crash, South African Airways Flight 201, another Comet, broke up shortly after takeoff and crashed not far from Ponza.
- On 21 December 1959, Vickers Viscount I-LIZT of Alitalia crashed short of the runway on a training flight exercise in landing with two engines inoperative. Both people on board were killed.
- On 10 November 2008, Ryanair Flight 4102 from Hahn suffered damage during landing. The cause of the accident was stated to be birdstrikes affecting both engines. The port undercarriage of the Boeing 737-8AS collapsed. The aircraft involved was Boeing 737-8AS EI-DYG, delivered new to Ryanair from Boeing. There were 6 crew and 166 passengers on board. The airport was closed for over 24 hours as a result of the accident. Two crew and eight passengers were taken to hospital with minor injuries. As well as damage to the engines and undercarriage, the rear fuselage was also damaged by contact with the runway. The final report of the accident, investigated by ANSV (National Agency for the Safety of Flights) was released on 20 December 2018, more than 10 years after the accident.
