= Hazel (disambiguation) =

Hazel is a genus of nut-bearing trees and shrubs, including common hazel.

Hazel may also refer to:

== Names ==
- Hazel (given name), including a list of people or fictional characters so named
- Hazel (surname), a list of people with the surname
- Hedley Hazelden (1915–2001), nicknamed 'Hazel', British test pilot and Second World War bomber pilot

== Places in the United States ==
- Hazel, Kentucky, a city
- Hazel, South Dakota, a town
- Hazel, Washington, an unincorporated community
- Hazel, West Virginia, an unincorporated community
- Hazel Creek (disambiguation)
- Hazel Run Township, Yellow Medicine County, Minnesota

== Arts and entertainment ==
- Hazel (band), a band
- "Hazel" (Cocteau Twins song)
- "Hazel" (song), a song by Bob Dylan
- "Hazel", a song in the album Pony by Spratleys Japs
- Hazel Wright Organ, nicknamed "Hazel", an American pipe organ in Christ Cathedral in Garden Grove, California, United States
- Hazel (comics), a comic strip
  - Hazel (TV series), a sitcom based on the comic strip

== Other uses ==
- Hazel eye color
- Tropical Storm Hazel, a list of meteorological phenomena
- Hazel station, a Sacramento RT Light Rail station near Gold River, California, United States

== See also ==
- Hazel dormouse, a species of rodent
- Hazel grouse, a species of bird
- Hazell, a list of people and fictional characters with the surname
- Hazell Dean (born 1952), English dance-pop singer
- Hazell (TV series), a British TV series
- Hazle (disambiguation)
