= Hazle =

Hazle may refer to:

== People ==
- Bob Hazle (1930–1992), American baseball player
- Edmund Hazle (1918–2006), British soldier
- George Hazle (1924–2011), South African racewalker
- Marlene Hazle (1934–2011), American computer scientist
- Mike Hazle (born 1979), American javelin thrower
- H. R. Crawford (1939–2017), African-American real estate developer and politician

== Places ==
- Hazle Creek, Pennsylvania, United States
- Hazle Township, Luzerne County, Pennsylvania

== See also ==
- Hazel (disambiguation)
- Hazell, a surname
