= Handley Page Victor =

British strategic bomber and tanker aircraft

Victor
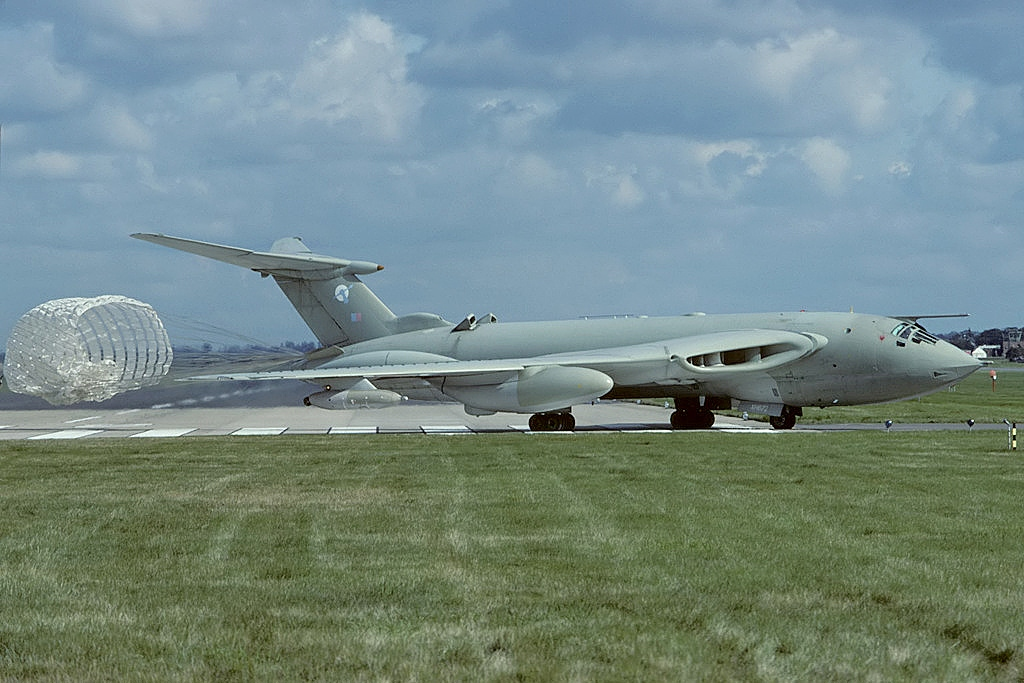
- Handley Page HP-80 Victor K2 after landing, with drogue parachute deployed

General information
- Type: Strategic bomber or aerial refuelling tanker aircraft
- National origin: United Kingdom
- Manufacturer: Handley Page Limited
- Status: Retired
- Primary user: Royal Air Force
- Number built: 86

History
- Manufactured: 1952–1963
- Introduction date: April 1958
- First flight: 24 December 1952
- Last flight: 3 May 2009
- Variants: Handley Page HP.97 (Civilian version, but not developed)

The Handley Page Victor is a British jet-powered strategic bomber developed and produced by Handley Page during the Cold War. It was the third and final 'V bomber' to be operated by the Royal Air Force (RAF), the other two being the Vickers Valiant and the Avro Vulcan.

Entering service in 1958, the Victor was initially developed as part of the United Kingdom's airborne nuclear deterrent. It was retired from the nuclear mission in 1968, following the discovery of fatigue cracks, which had been exacerbated by the RAF's adoption of a low-altitude flight profile to avoid interception. The pending introduction of the Royal Navy's submarine-launched Polaris missiles in 1969 meant a large bomber force would no longer be needed, and the decision was made to retire the Victors from front-line service in favour of the Vulcan.

A number of Victors were modified for strategic reconnaissance, using a combination of radar, cameras, and other sensors. Prior to the introduction of Polaris, some had already been converted into tankers to replace similar converted Valiants. Further tanker conversions followed and in 1982 some of these re-purposed Victors refuelled Vulcan bombers during the Black Buck raids of the Falklands War. The Victor was the last of the V-bombers to be retired from service on 15 October 1993. The Victor was replaced by Lockheed Tristar and Vickers VC10 tankers.

== Development ==
=== Origins ===
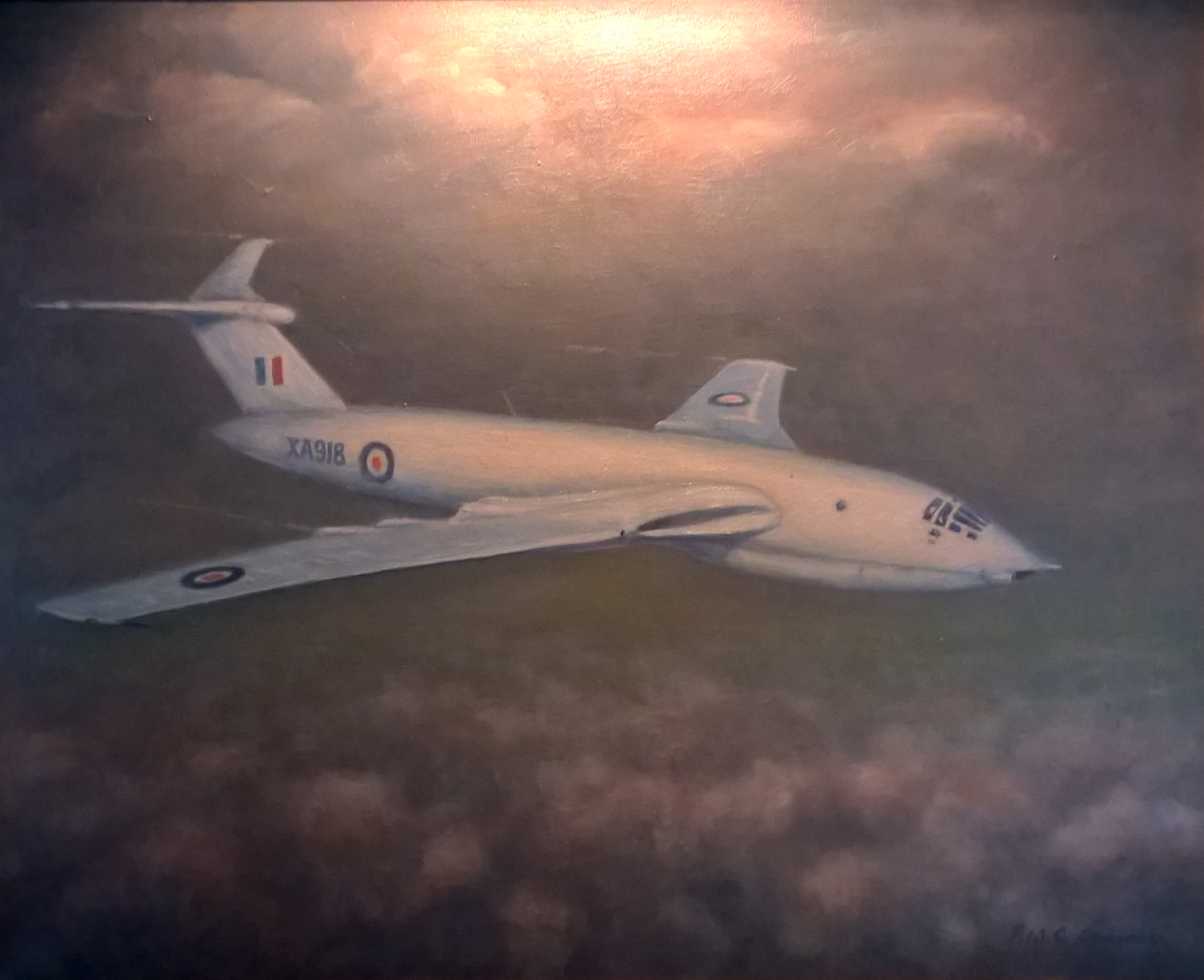
Painting of test Victor B1 XA918 by artist and former Handley Page employee Peter Coombs

The origin of the Victor and the other V bombers is linked to the early British atomic weapons programme and nuclear deterrent policies that were developed after the Second World War. The atom bomb programme formally began with Air Staff Operational Requirement OR.1001 issued in August 1946, which anticipated a government decision in January 1947 to authorise research and development work on atomic weapons; the US Atomic Energy Act of 1946 (McMahon Act) prohibited the export of atomic knowledge, even to countries that had collaborated on the Manhattan Project. OR.1001 envisaged a weapon not to exceed 24 ft 2 in (7.37 m) in length, 5 ft (1.5 m) in diameter, 10,000 lb (4,500 kg) in weight, and suitable for release from 20,000 ft (6,100 m) to 50,000 ft (15,000 m).

At the same time, the Air Ministry drew up requirements for bombers to replace the piston-engined heavy bombers such as the Avro Lancaster and the new Avro Lincoln which equipped RAF Bomber Command. (Note: Frederick Handley Page, the founder and owner of Handley Page, had anticipated that there would be a need to replace the Lincoln bomber well in advance of any requirement, having issued a memo on 14 June 1945 requesting the immediate investigation of two new bomber designs.) In January 1947, the Ministry of Supply distributed Specification B.35/46 to aviation companies to satisfy Air Staff Operational Requirement OR.229 for "a medium range bomber landplane capable of carrying one 10,000 lb (4,500 kg) bomb to a target 1,500 nautical miles (2,800 km; 1,700 mi) from a base which may be anywhere in the world". A cruising speed of 500 knots (930 km/h; 580 mph) at heights between 35,000 ft (11,000 m) and 50,000 ft (15,000 m) was specified. The maximum weight when fully loaded ought not to exceed 100,000 lb (45,000 kg). The weapons load was to include a 10,000 lb (4,500 kg) "Special gravity bomb" (i.e. a free-fall nuclear weapon), or over shorter ranges 20,000 lb (9,100 kg) of conventional bombs. No defensive weapons were to be carried, the aircraft relying on its speed and altitude to avoid opposing fighters.

The similar OR.230 required a "long range bomber" with a 2,000 nautical miles (2,300 mi; 3,700 km) radius of action at a height of 50,000 ft (15,000 m), a cruising speed of 575 miles per hour (925 km/h), and a maximum weight of 200,000 lb (91,000 kg) when fully loaded. Responses to OR.230 were received from Short Brothers, Bristol, and Handley Page; the Air Ministry recognised that developing an aircraft to meet these stringent requirements would have been technically demanding and so expensive that the resulting bomber could be purchased only in small numbers. Realising that the majority of likely targets would not require such a long range, a less demanding specification for a medium-range bomber, Air Ministry Specification B.35/46 was issued. This demanded the ability to carry the same 10,000 lb bomb-load to a target 1,500 nautical miles (2,800 km; 1,700 mi) away at a height of 45,000–50,000 ft (14,000–15,000 m) at a speed of 575 mph (925 km/h).

=== HP.80 ===
The design proposed by Handley Page in response to B.35/46 was given the internal designation of HP.80. To achieve the required performance, Handley Page's aerodynamicist Gustav Lachmann and his deputy, Godfrey Lee developed a crescent-shaped swept wing for the HP.80. Aviation author Bill Gunston described the Victor's compound-sweep crescent wing as having been "undoubtedly the most efficient high-subsonic wing on any drawing board in 1947". The sweep and chord of the wing decreased in three distinct steps from the root to the tip, to ensure a constant critical Mach number across the entire wing and consequently a high cruise speed. The other parts of the aircraft which accelerate the flow, the nose and tail, were also designed for the same critical mach number so the shape of the HP.80 had a constant critical mach number all over. Early work on the project included tailless aircraft designs, which would have used wing-tip vertical surfaces instead; however as the proposal matured, a high-mounted, full tailplane was adopted instead. The profile and shaping of the crescent wing was subject to considerable fine-tuning and alterations throughout the early development stages, particularly to counter unfavourable pitching behaviour in flight.

The HP.80 and Avro's Type 698 were chosen as the best two of the proposed designs to B.35/46, and orders for two prototypes of each were placed. It was recognised, however, that there were many unknowns associated with both designs, and an order was also placed for Vickers' design, which became the Valiant. Although not fully meeting the requirements of the specification, the Valiant design posed little risk of failure and could therefore reach service earlier. The HP.80's crescent wing was tested on a ⅓-scale glider, the HP.87, and a heavily modified Supermarine Attacker, which was given the Handley Page HP.88 designation. The HP.88 crashed on 26 August 1951 after completing only about thirty flights and little useful data was gained during its brief two months of existence. By the time the HP.88 was ready, the HP.80 wing had changed such that the former was no longer representative. The design of the HP.80 had sufficiently advanced that the loss of the HP.88 had little effect on the programme.

Two HP.80 prototypes, WB771 and WB775, were built. WB771 had been partially assembled at the Handley Page factory at Radlett airfield when the Ministry of Supply decided the runway was too short for the first flight. The aircraft parts were transported by road to RAF Boscombe Down where they were assembled for the first flight; bulldozers were used to clear the route and create paths around obstacles. Sections of the aircraft were hidden under wooden framing and tarpaulins printed with "GELEYPANDHY / SOUTHAMPTON" to make it appear as a boat hull in transit. GELEYPANDHY was an anagram of "Handley Pyge", marred by a signwriter's error. On 24 December 1952, piloted by Handley Page's chief test pilot Hedley Hazelden, WB771 made its maiden flight, which lasted for a total of 17 minutes. Ten days later, the Air Ministry announced the aircraft's official name to be Victor. (Note: According to aviation author Jon Lake, the name 'Victor' had originated from British Prime Minister Winston Churchill.)

The prototypes performed well; however, design failings led to the loss of WB771 on 14 July 1954, when the tailplane detached whilst making a low-level pass over the runway at Cranfield, causing the aircraft to crash with the loss of the crew. Attached to the fin using three bolts, the tailplane was subjected to considerably more load than had been anticipated, causing fatigue cracking around the bolt holes. This led to the bolts loosening and failing in shear. Stress concentrations around the holes were reduced by adding a fourth bolt. The potential for flutter due to shortcomings in the design of the fin/tailplane joint was also reduced by shortening the fin. Additionally, the prototypes were tail heavy due to the lack of equipment in the nose; this was remedied by adding large ballast weights to the prototypes. Production Victors had a lengthened nose to move the crew escape door further from the engine intakes as the original position was considered too dangerous as an emergency exit in flight. The lengthened nose also improved the center of gravity range.

=== Victor B.1 ===
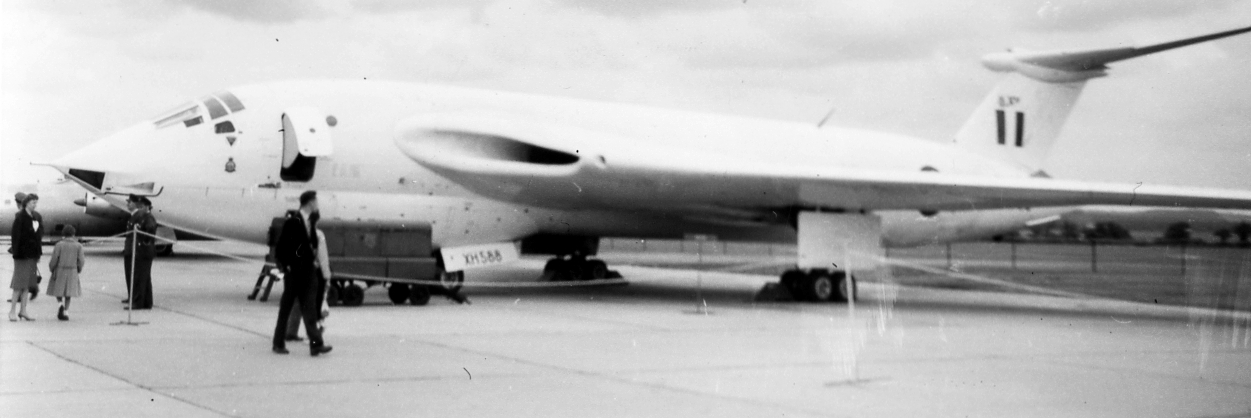
Victor B1A XH588 at an East Anglian Battle of Britain day event, 1959

Production B.1 Victors were powered by the Armstrong Siddeley Sapphire ASSa.7 turbojets rated at 11,000 lbf (49 kN), and were initially armed with the Blue Danube nuclear weapon and later with the more powerful Yellow Sun weapon when it became available. Victors also carried US-owned Mark 5 nuclear bombs (made available under the Project E programme) and the British Red Beard tactical nuclear weapon. A total of 24 were upgraded to B.1A standard by the addition of Red Steer tail warning radar in an enlarged tail-cone and a suite of radar warning receivers and electronic countermeasures (ECM) from 1958 to 1960.

On 1 June 1956, a production Victor XA917 flown by test pilot Johnny Allam inadvertently exceeded the speed of sound after Allam let the nose drop slightly at a high power setting. Allam noticed a cockpit indication of Mach 1.1 and ground observers from Watford to Banbury reported hearing a sonic boom. The Victor maintained stability throughout the event. Aviation author Andrew Brookes has claimed that Allam broke the sound barrier knowingly to demonstrate the Victor's higher speed capability compared to the earlier V-bombers. (Note: Paul Langston, an observer on-board while XA917 broke the sound barrier, has the distinction of being the first man to break the sound barrier seated backwards.) The Victor was the first bomber and largest aircraft to have broken the sound barrier at that time.

=== Victor B.2 ===
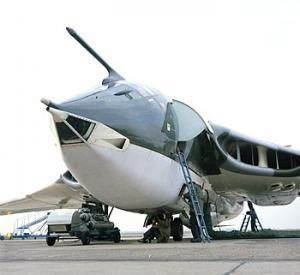
Victor B.2 at RAF Wittering undergoing pre-flight preparations

The RAF required its bombers to be capable of higher operational ceilings, and numerous proposals were considered for improved Victors. Initially, Handley Page proposed using 14,000 lbf (62 kN) Sapphire 9 engines to produce a "Phase 2" bomber, to be followed by "Phase 3" Victors with the wingspan increased to 137 ft (42 m) and powered by Bristol Siddeley Olympus turbojets or Rolls-Royce Conway turbofans. The Sapphire 9 was cancelled and the heavily modified Phase 3 aircraft would have delayed introduction, so an interim "Phase 2A" Victor was proposed and accepted, to be powered by the Conway but with minimal modifications.

The "Phase 2A" proposal became the Victor B.2, with Conway RCo.11 engines providing 17,250 lbf (76.7 kN), which required enlarged intakes to increase the airflow to the engines, and the wingspan was increased to 120 ft (37 m). The B.2 also added a pair of retractable "elephant ear" intakes on the upper rear fuselage forward of the fin, to feed air to ram air turbines to provide electricity should an in-flight engine failure occur.

The first flight of the Victor B.2 prototype, serial number XH668, was made on 20 February 1959, and it had flown 100 hours by 20 August 1959, when it disappeared from radar, crashing into the sea off the Pembrokeshire coast during high-altitude engine tests carried out by the Aeroplane and Armament Experimental Establishment (A&AEE). Most of the wreckage had been recovered by November 1960, following an extensive search-and-recovery operation. The accident investigation concluded that the starboard pitot head had failed, causing the flight control system to force the aircraft into an unrecoverable dive. Minor changes resolved the problem, allowing the B.2 to enter service in February 1962.

=== Further development ===
A total of 21 B.2 aircraft were upgraded to the B.2R standard with Conway RCo.17 engines (20,600 lbf or 92 kN thrust) and facilities to carry a Blue Steel stand-off nuclear missile. Anti-radar chaff storage had to be relocated from under the nose as a result of the Blue Steel installation. Coincidentally, Peter White, a senior aerodynamicist attended a symposium in Brussels and learned of Whitcomb's conical bodies set on the top of a wing which would add volume while reducing wave drag. However, the added skin friction drag meant an overall slight drag increase, so large streamlined fairings were added to the top of each wing to hold the chaff. The fairings behaved like "Küchemann carrots". These were anti-shock bodies which reduced wave drag at transonic speeds (see area rule). Handley Page proposed to build a further refined "Phase 6" Victor, with more fuel and capable of carrying up to four Skybolt (AGM-48) ballistic missiles on standing airborne patrols, but this proposal was rejected although it was agreed that some of the Victor B.2s on order would be fitted to carry two Skybolts. This plan was abandoned when the US cancelled the Skybolt programme in 1963. With the move to low-level penetration missions, the Victors were fitted with air-to-air refuelling probes above the cockpit and received large underwing fuel tanks.

Nine B.2 aircraft were converted for strategic reconnaissance purposes to replace Valiants which had been withdrawn due to wing fatigue, with delivery beginning in July 1965. These aircraft received a variety of cameras, a bomb bay-mounted radar mapping system and air sampling equipment to detect particles released from nuclear testing. Designated Victor SR.2, a single aircraft could photograph the whole of the United Kingdom in a single two-hour sortie. Different camera configurations could be installed in the bomb bay, including up to four F49 survey cameras and up to eight F96 cameras could be fitted to take vertical or oblique daylight photography; nighttime photography required the fitting of F89 cameras.

=== Aerial refuelling conversion ===
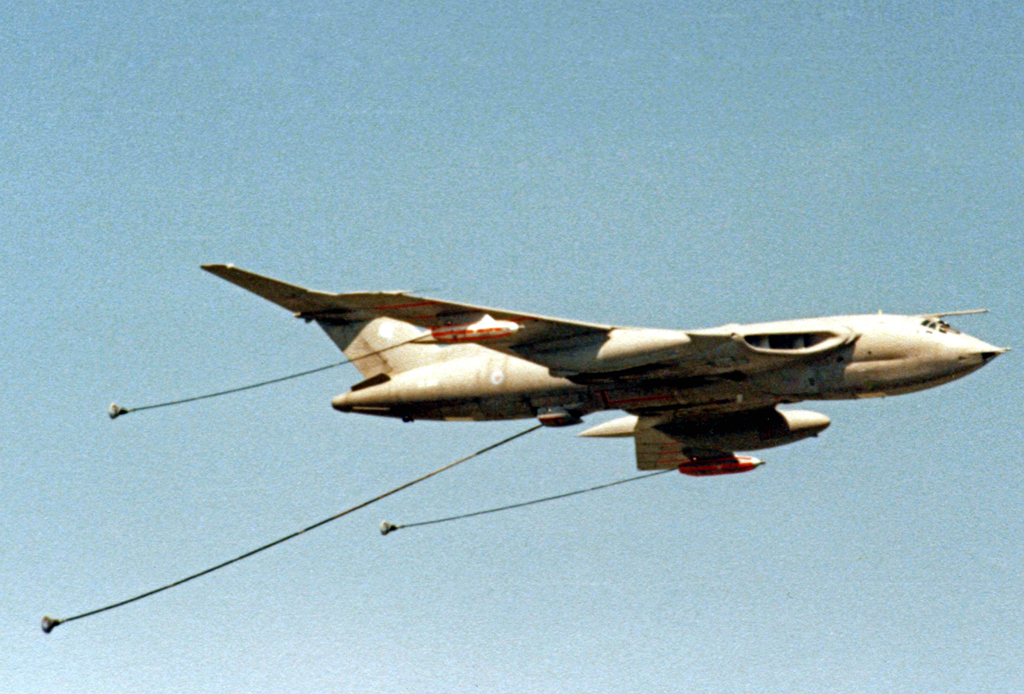
Victor K.2 of No. 55 Squadron RAF in 1985; note the deployed refuelling drogues.

Prior to the demise of the Valiant as a tanker, a trial installation of refuelling equipment was carried out using the Victor, including: overload bomb-bay tanks, underwing tanks, refuelling probe and jettisonable de Havilland Spectre Assisted Take-Off units. The aircraft involved in the trials, B.1 "XA930", carried out successful trials at Boscombe Down at very high all-up weights with relatively short field length take-offs.

With the withdrawal of the Valiant because of metal fatigue in December 1964 the RAF had no flight-refuelling capability, so the B.1/1A aircraft, by then surplus in the strategic bomber role, were refitted for this duty. To get some tankers into service as quickly as possible, six B.1A aircraft were converted to B(K).1A standard (later redesignated B.1A (K2P)), receiving a two-point system with a hose and drogue carried under each wing, while the bomb bay remained available for weapons. Handley Page worked day and night to convert these six aircraft, with the first being delivered on 28 April 1965, and 55 Squadron becoming operational in the tanker role in August 1965.

While these six aircraft provided a limited tanker capability suitable for refuelling fighters, the Mk 20A wing hosereels delivered fuel at too low a rate to be suitable for refuelling bombers. Work therefore continued to produce a definitive three-point tanker conversion of the Victor Mk.1. Fourteen further B.1A and 11 B.1 were fitted with two permanently fitted fuel tanks in the bomb bay, and a high-capacity Mk 17 centreline hose dispenser unit with three times the fuel flow rate as the wing reels, and were designated K.1A and K.1 respectively.

The remaining B.2 aircraft were not as suited to the low-level mission profile that the RAF had adopted for carrying out strategic bombing missions as the Vulcan with its stronger delta wing. This, combined with the switch of the nuclear deterrent from the RAF to the Royal Navy (with the Polaris missile) meant that the Victors were declared surplus to requirements. Hence, 24 B.2 were modified to K.2 standard. Similar to the K.1/1A conversions, the wing, which was to have been fitted with tip fuel tanks to reduce wing fatigue, had 18 inches removed from each tip instead and the bomb aimer's nose glazing was replaced with metal. During 1982, the glazing was reintroduced on some aircraft, the former nose bomb aimer's position having been used to mount F95 cameras in order to perform reconnaissance missions during the Falklands War. The K.2 could carry 91,000 lb (41,000 kg) of fuel. It served in the tanker role until withdrawn in October 1993.

== Design ==
=== Overview ===
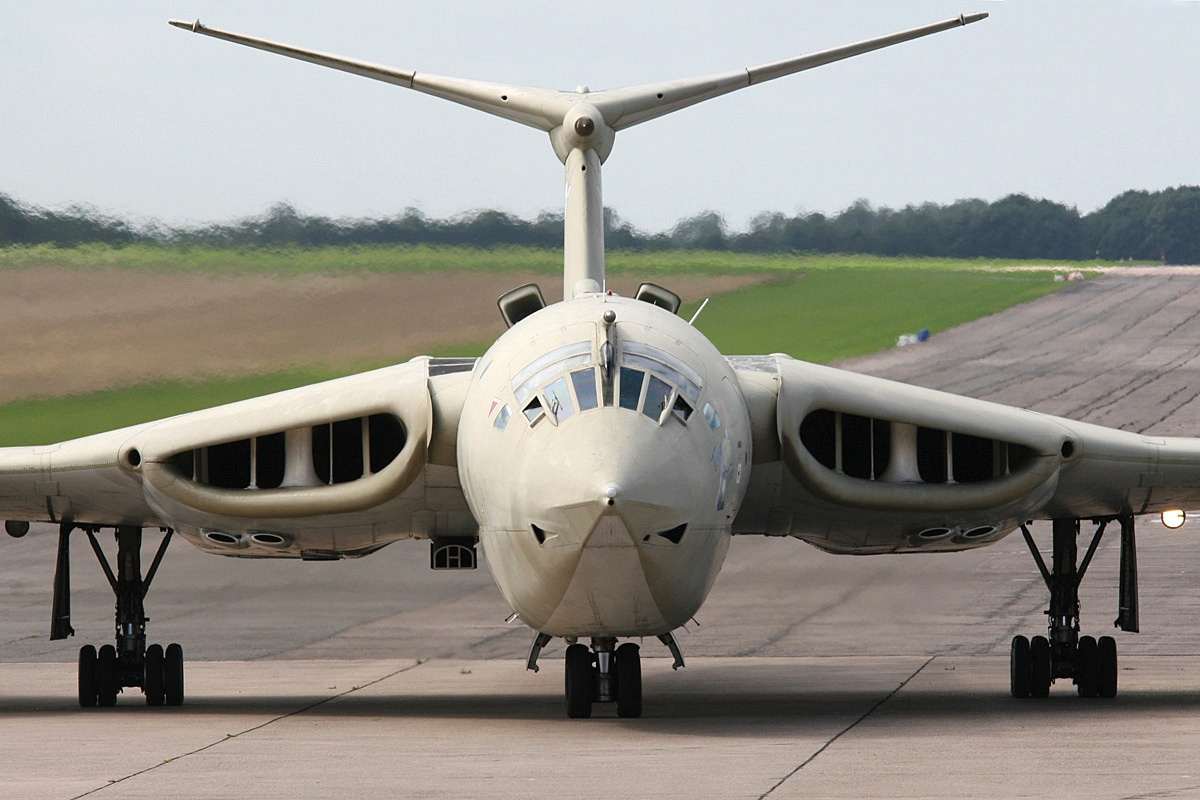
Head-on view of a Victor during a ground taxi run, 2006

The Victor was a futuristic-looking, streamlined aircraft, with four turbojet (later turbofan) engines buried in the thick wing roots. Distinguishing features of the Victor were its highly swept T-tail with considerable dihedral on the tail planes, and a prominent chin bulge that contained the targeting radar, nose landing gear unit and an auxiliary bomb aimer's position. It was originally required by the specification that the whole nose section could be detached at high altitudes to act as an escape pod, but the Air Ministry abandoned this requirement in 1950.

The Victor had a five-man crew, comprising the two pilots seated side by side and three rearward-facing crew, these being the navigator/plotter, the navigator/radar operator, and the air electronics officer (AEO). The Victor's pilots sat at the same level as the rest of the crew, due to a large pressurised compartment that extended all the way to the nose. As with the other V-bombers, only the pilots were provided with ejection seats with the three systems operators relying on "explosive cushions" inflated by a CO_{2} bottle that would help them from their seats, but despite this, successful escape for them would have been unlikely in most emergency situations. (Note: Martin Baker developed and tested rearward ejection systems for both the Valiant and the Vulcan, proceeding to the point of a modified Valiant undergoing testing; however the company concluded that the same approach on the Victor would be substantially more difficult due to structural reasons.)

While assigned to the nuclear delivery role, the Victor was finished in an all-over anti-flash white colour scheme, designed to protect the aircraft against the damaging effects of a nuclear detonation. The white colour scheme was intended to reflect heat away from the aircraft; paler variations of RAF's roundels were also applied for this same reason. When the V-bombers were assigned to the low-level approach profile in the 1960s, the Victors were soon repainted in green/grey tactical camouflage to reduce visibility to ground observation; the same scheme was applied to subsequently converted tanker aircraft.

=== Armaments and equipment ===
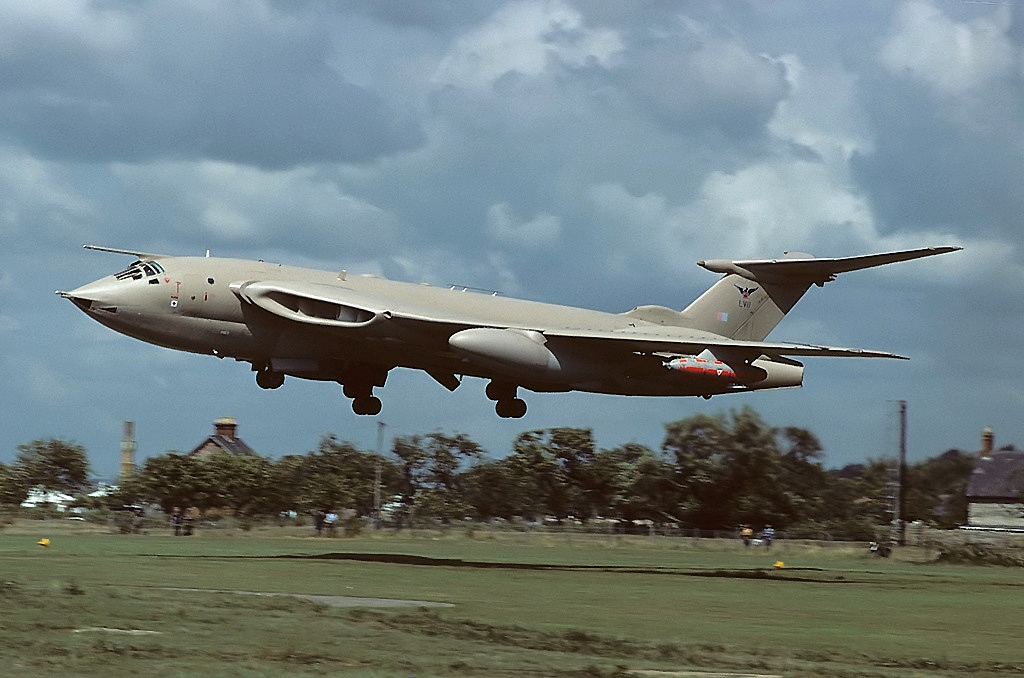
Victor K2 of No. 57 Squadron RAF landing at RNAS Yeovilton, 1984

The Victor's bomb bay was much larger than that of the Valiant and Vulcan, which allowed heavier weapon loads to be carried at the cost of range. As an alternative to the single "10,000 lb" nuclear bomb as required by the specification, the bomb bay was designed to carry several conventional armaments, including a single 22,000 lb (10,000 kg) Grand Slam or two 12,000 lb (5,400 kg) Tallboy earthquake bombs, up to forty-eight 1,000 lb (450 kg) bombs (Note: In operational service with the RAF, a maximum payload of 35 1,000 lb bombs could be carried.) or thirty-nine 2,000 lb (910 kg) sea mines. One proposed addition to the Victor were underwing panniers capable of carrying a further 28 1,000 lb bombs to supplement the main bomb bay, but this option was not pursued.

In addition to a range of free-fall nuclear bombs, later Victor B.2s operated as missile carriers for standoff nuclear missiles such as Blue Steel. Target information for Blue Steel could be input during flight, as well in advance of the mission. It was reported that, with intensive work, a B.2 missile carrier could revert to carrying free-fall nuclear weapons or conventional munitions within 30 hours.

Like the other two V-Bombers, the Victor made use of the Navigational and Bombing System (NBS); a little-used optical sight had also been installed upon early aircraft. For navigation and bomb-aiming purposes, the Victor employed several radar systems. These included the H2S radar, developed from the first airborne ground-scanning radar, and the Green Satin radar. Radar information was inputted into the onboard electromechanical analogue bomb-aiming apparatus. Some of the navigation and targeting equipment was either directly descended from, or shared concepts with, those used on Handley Page's preceding Halifax bomber. Operationally, the accuracy of the bomb-aiming system proved to be limited to roughly 400 yards, which was deemed sufficient for high-level nuclear strike operations.

=== Avionics and systems ===
The Victor had fully powered flying controls for the ailerons, elevators and rudder, with no manual reversion which required duplication as back-up. Since the control surfaces were fully powered an artificial feel unit was provided, fed by ram air from the pitot in the nose. Pilot control movements were transmitted via a low-friction mechanical system to the flying control units. Duplication was provided on the premise that the single pilot's input would remain functional and that neither hydraulic motors nor screwjack on a unit would jam. A separate hydraulic circuit was used for each of the following: landing gear, flaps, nose flaps, air brakes, bomb doors, wheel brakes, nose-wheel steering, ram-air-turbine air scoops. An AC electrical system and auxiliary power unit were significant additions to the later Victor B.2, electrical reliability being noticeably improved. (Note: Godfrey Lee, one of the aircraft's designers, stated of the electrical changes that "an unbelievable improvement followed from going over from DC to AC".)

To evade enemy detection and interception efforts, the Victor was outfitted with an extensive ECM suite which were operated by the air electronics officer (AEO), who had primary responsibility for the aircraft's electronics and communication systems. The ECM equipment could be employed to disrupt effective use of both active and passive radar in the vicinity of the aircraft, and to provide situational awareness for the crew. Enemy communications could also be jammed, and radar guided missiles of the era were also reportedly rendered ineffective. The Victor B.2 featured an extended area located around the base of the tail fin which contained cooling systems and some of the ECM equipment.

Some of the ECM equipment which initially saw use on the Victor, such as the original chaff dispenser and Orange Putter tail warning radar, had been developed for the earlier English Electric Canberra bomber and was already considered to be nearly obsolete by the time the Victor entered service. Significant improvements and alterations were made to the avionics and ECM suites, as effective ECMs had been deemed critical to the Victor's role;. For example, the introduction of the more capable Red Steer tail warning radar. The introduction of the Victor B.2 was accompanied by several new ECM systems, including a passive radar warning receiver, a metric radar jammer and communications jamming equipment. Streamlined fairings on the trailing edges of the wings that could house large quantities of defensive chaff/flares were also new additions. While trials were conducted with terrain-following radar and a side scan mode for the bombing and navigation radar, neither of these functions were integrated into the operational fleet.

=== Engines ===
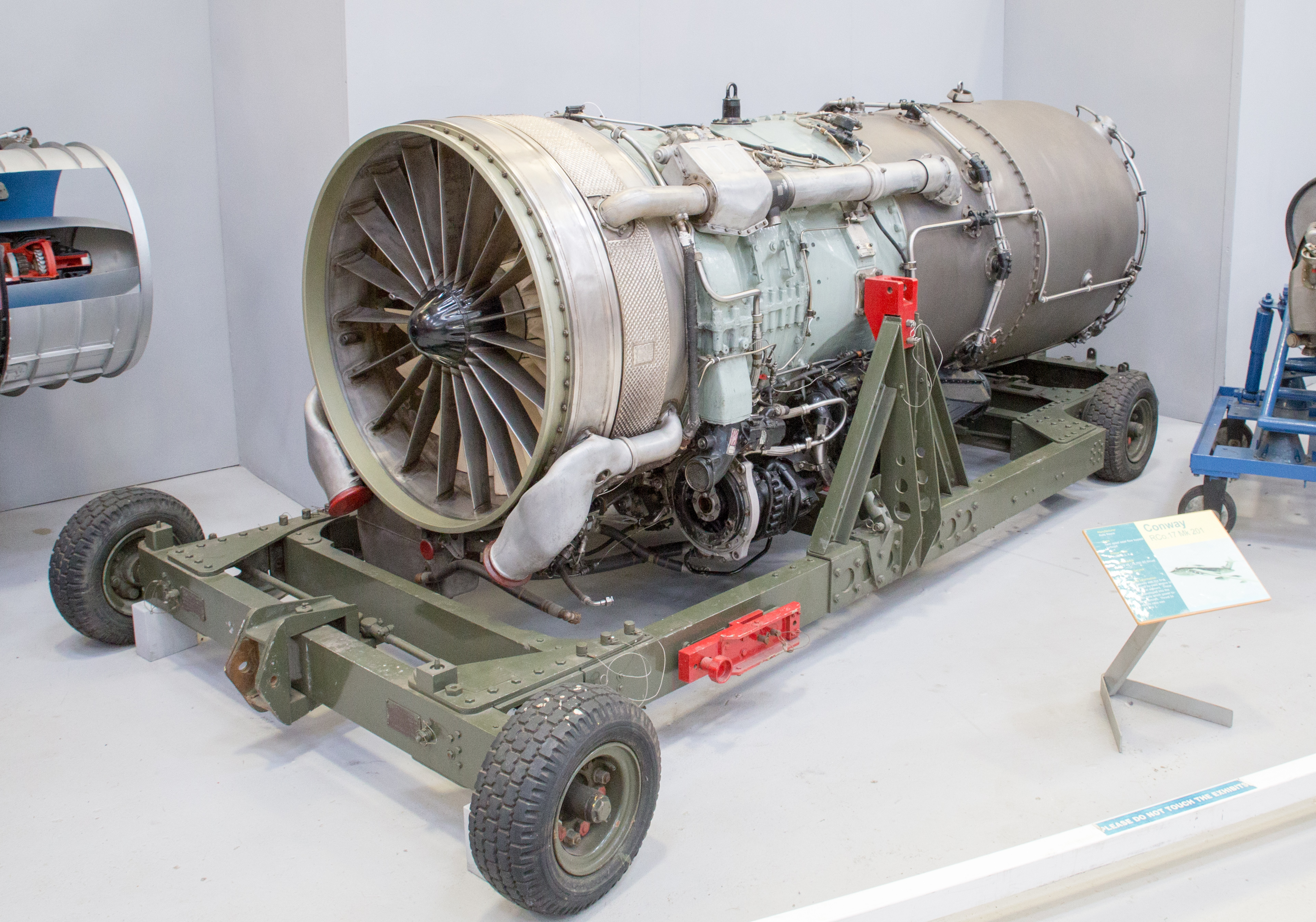
Rolls-Royce Conway RCo.17 Mk 201 on static display

The Victor B.1 was powered by four Armstrong Siddeley Sapphire turbojet engines. The engines were embedded in pairs in the wing roots. Because of the mid wing position, the tail was mounted at the tip of the fin to keep clear of the jet efflux. Sapphire engines installed in the Victor suffered 'centre-line closure' failures flying in dense cloud or heavy rain flying in the tropics. The Victor B.2 was powered by the newer Rolls-Royce Conway turbofan which at one point was the most powerful non-afterburning engine outside the Soviet Union. The Conway had significantly higher thrust than the Sapphire engine in the B.1.

The Victor B.2 had a Blackburn Artouste auxiliary power unit (AAPU) installed in the starboard wing root. It provided high-pressure air for starting the engines, and also provided electrical power on the ground or in the air as an emergency power supply if the engine-driven generators failed. It also reduced the need for some ground support equipment. Two turbine-driven alternators, otherwise known as ram air turbines (RATs), had been introduced on the B.2 to provide emergency power in the event of electrical power being lost. Retractable scoops in the rear fuselage would open to feed ram air to them enabling them to generate sufficient electrical power to operate the flight controls. In the event of engine flameout RATs would enable the crew to keep control of the aircraft until the engines could be relit.

=== Flight profile ===
The Victor was commonly described as having good handling and excellent performance, along with favourable low speed flight characteristics. During the flight tests of the first prototype, the Victor proved its aerodynamic performance, flying up to Mach 0.98 without handling or buffeting problems; there were next to no aerodynamic changes between prototype and production aircraft. (Note: Hedley Hazelden, Handley Page's chief test pilot, stated that "From a pilot's point of view, the Victor wasn't that much of a problem. In spite of innovations such as powered controls and nose flaps, it flew like any other aeroplane".) Production aircraft featured an automated nose-flap operation to counteract a tendency for the aircraft to pitch upwards during low-to-moderate Mach numbers. At low altitude, the Victor typically flew in a smooth and comfortable manner, in part due to its narrowness and flexibility of the crescent wing. One unusual flight characteristic of the early Victor was its self-landing capability; once lined up with the runway, the aircraft would naturally flare as the wing entered into ground effect while the tail continued to sink, giving a cushioned landing without any command or intervention by the pilot. However, this characteristic was considered to be of no special advantage according to an assessment of the second prototype by the Aeroplane and Armament Experimental Establishment.

The Victor has been described as an agile aircraft, atypical for a large bomber aircraft; in 1958, a Victor had performed several loops and a barrel roll during practices for a display flight at Farnborough Airshow. Manoeuvrability was greatly enabled by the light controls, quick response of the aircraft, and the design of certain flight surfaces such as the infinitely-variable tail-mounted airbrake. The Victor was designed for flight at high subsonic speeds, although multiple instances have occurred in which the sound barrier was broken. During development of the Victor B.2, the RAF had stressed the concept of tactical manoeuvrability, which led to much effort in development being given to increasing the aircraft's height and range performance.

== Operational history ==
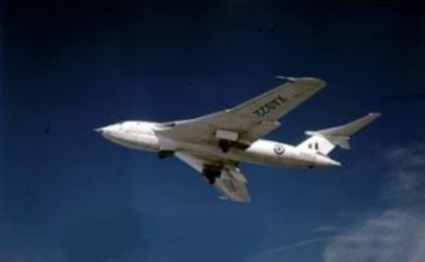
Victor B.1 (XA922) on a landing approach, circa 1959

The Victor was the last of the V bombers to enter service, with deliveries of B.1s to No. 232 Operational Conversion Unit RAF based at RAF Gaydon, Warwickshire taking place in late 1957. The first operational bomber squadron, 10 Squadron, formed at RAF Cottesmore in April 1958, with a second squadron, 15 Squadron, forming before the end of the year. Four Victors, fitted with Yellow Astor reconnaissance radar, together with passive sensors, were used to equip a secretive unit, the Radar Reconnaissance Flight at RAF Wyton. The Victor bomber force continued to build up, with 57 Squadron forming in March 1959 and 55 Squadron in October 1960. At its height, the Victor was simultaneously operating with six squadrons of RAF Bomber Command.

According to the operational doctrine developed by the RAF, in the circumstance of deploying a large-scale nuclear strike, each Victor would have operated entirely independently; the crews would conduct their mission without external guidance and be reliant upon the effectiveness of their individual tactics to reach and successfully attack their assigned target; thus great emphasis was placed on continuous crew training during peacetime. Developing a sense of a crew unity was considered highly important; Victor crews would typically serve together for at least five years, and a similar approach was adopted with ground personnel. In order to maximise the operational lifespan of each aircraft, Victor crews typically flew a single five-hour training mission per week. Each crew member was required to qualify for servicing certificates to independently undertake inspection, refuelling and turnaround operations.

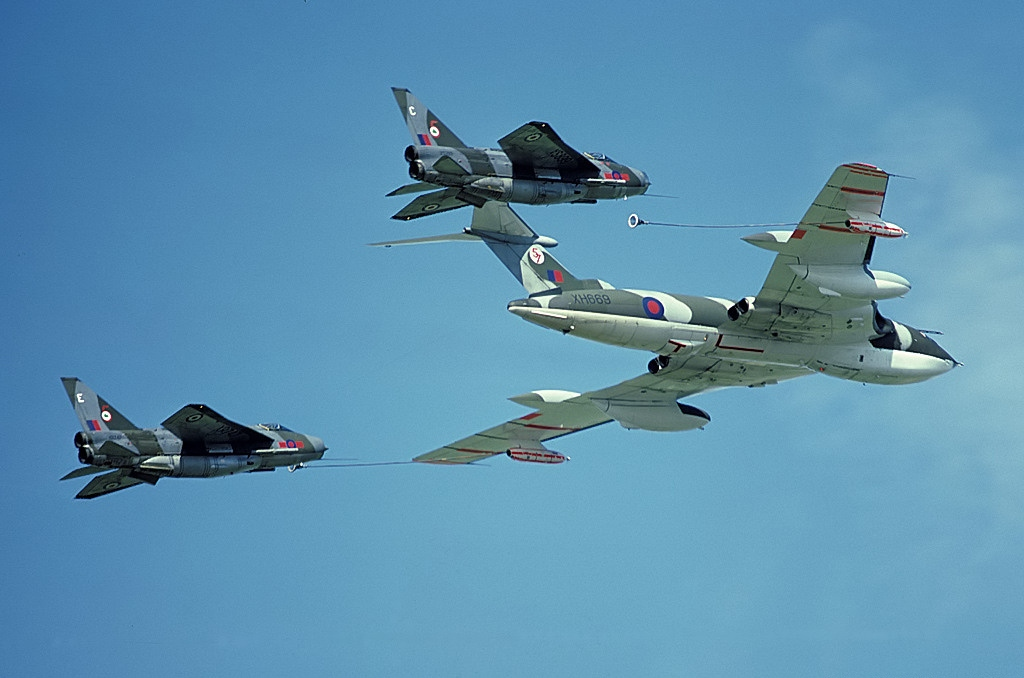
Victor K2 (XH669) refuelling a pair of English Electric Lightnings, September 1978

In times of high international tension, the V-bombers would have dispersed and been maintained at a high state of readiness; if the order was given to deploy a nuclear strike, Victors at high readiness would have been airborne in under four minutes. British intelligence had estimated that the Soviets' radar network was capable of detecting the Victor at up to 200 miles away, so to avoid interception, the Victor would follow carefully planned routes to exploit weaknesses in the Soviet detection network. This tactic was employed in conjunction with the Victor's extensive onboard ECM to increase the chances of evasion. Whilst originally the Victor would have maintained high-altitude flight throughout a nuclear strike mission, rapid advances of the Soviet anti-aircraft warfare capabilities (exemplified by the downing of a U-2 from 70,000 ft in 1960) led to this tactic being abandoned: a low-level high-speed approach supported by increasingly sophisticated ECMs was adopted in its place.

The improved Victor B.2 started to be delivered in 1961, with the first B.2 Squadron, 139 Squadron, forming in February 1962, and a second, 100 Squadron, in May 1962. These were the only two bomber squadrons to form on the B.2, as the last 28 Victors on order were cancelled. The prospect of Skybolt ballistic missiles, with which each V-bomber could strike at two targets, meant that fewer bombers would be needed. The government was also unhappy with Sir Frederick Handley Page's resistance to its pressure to merge his company with competitors. Following Skybolt's cancellation, Victor B.2s were retrofitted as carrier aircraft for the Blue Steel standoff nuclear missile. The introduction of standoff weapons and the switch to low-level flight to evade radar detection were said to be decisive factors in the successful penetration of enemy territory.

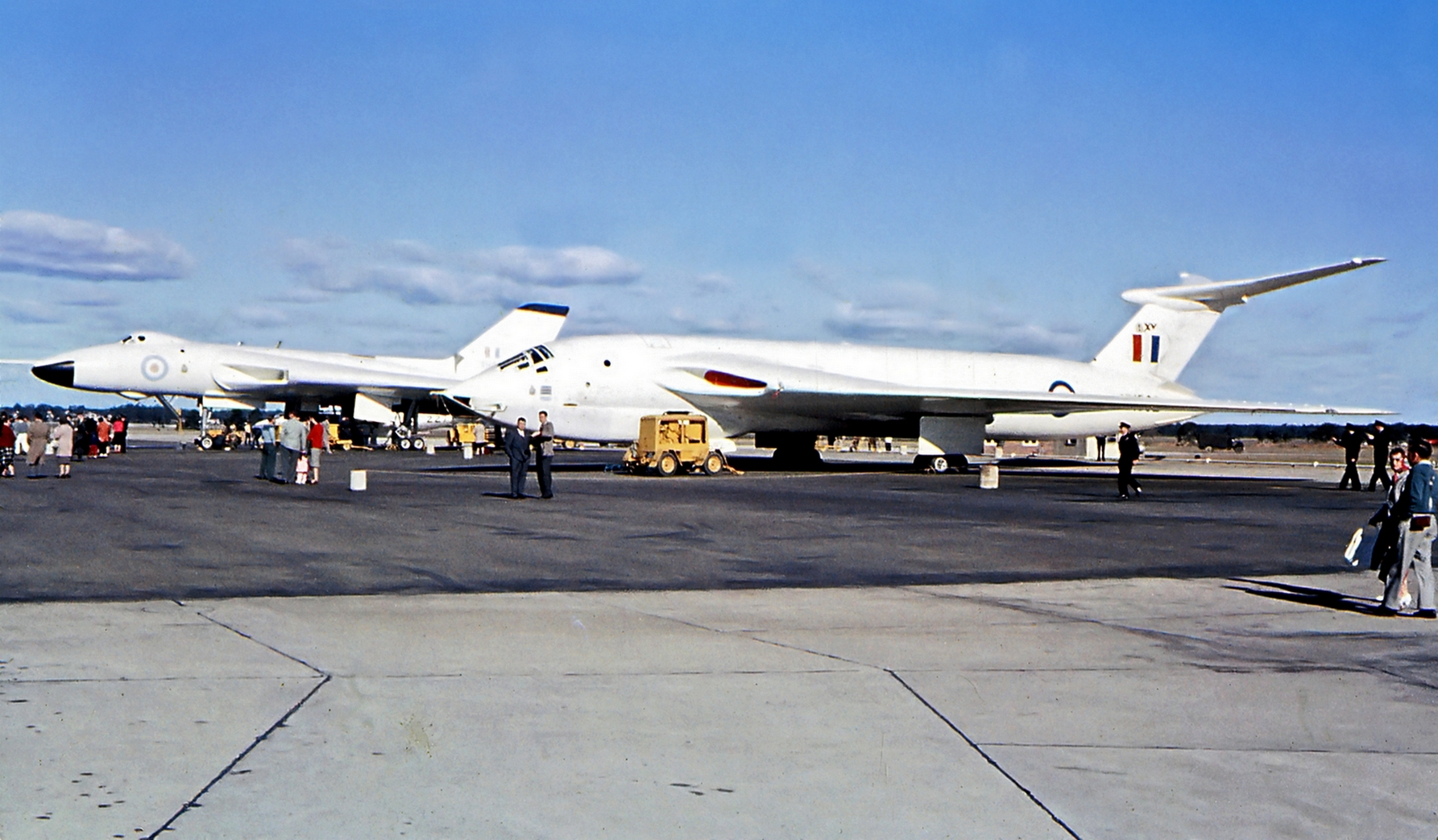
A Victor and a Vulcan at Richmond Air Show, New South Wales, 1964

In 1964–1965, detachments of Victor B.1As were deployed to RAF Tengah, Singapore as a deterrent against Indonesia during the Borneo conflict, the detachments fulfilling a strategic deterrent role as part of Far East Air Force, while also giving valuable training in low-level flight and visual bombing. In September 1964, with the confrontation with Indonesia reaching a peak, the detachment of four Victors was prepared for rapid dispersal, with two aircraft loaded with live conventional bombs and held on one-hour readiness, ready to fly operational sorties. They were not required to fly combat missions and the high readiness alert finished at the end of the month.

Following the discovery of fatigue cracks, developing due to their low-altitude flying, the B.2R strategic bombers were retired and placed in storage by the end of 1968. The RAF had experienced intense demand on its aerial refuelling tanker fleet, and its fleet of Victor B.1 tankers that had been converted earlier were due to be retired in the 1970s, so it was decided that the stored Victor B.2Rs would be converted to tankers. Handley Page prepared a modification scheme that would see the Victors fitted with tip tanks, the structure modified to limit further fatigue cracking in the wings, and ejection seats provided for all six crew. The Ministry of Defence delayed signing the order for conversion of the B2s until after Handley Page went into liquidation. The contract for conversion was instead awarded to Hawker Siddeley, who produced a much simpler conversion proposal, with the wingspan shortened to reduce wing bending stress and hence extend airframe life.

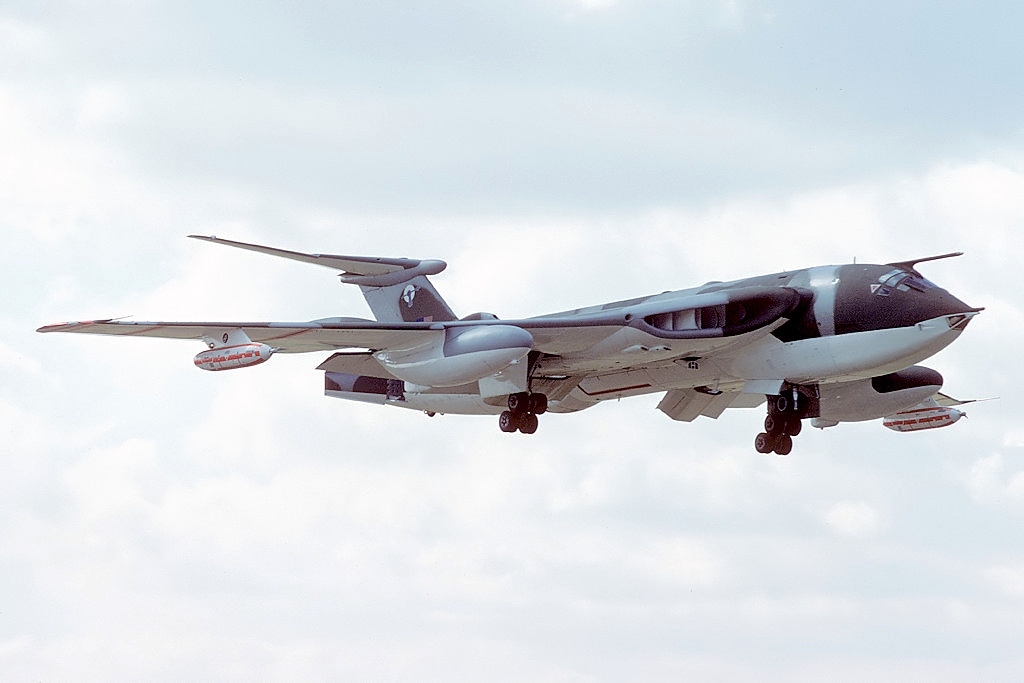
Victor K2 (XL161) approaching RAF Abingdon, September 1979

While the Victor was never permanently based with units stationed overseas, temporary deployments were frequently conducted, often in a ceremonial capacity or to participate in training exercises and competitions. Victor squadrons were dispatched on several extended deployments to the Far East and short term deployments to Canada were also conducted for training. At one point during the early 1960s, South Africa showed considerable interest in the acquisition of several bomber-configured Victors.

Several of the Victor B.2s had been converted for strategic reconnaissance following the retirement of the Valiant in this capacity. In service, this type was primarily used in surveillance of the Atlantic Ocean and Mediterranean Seas, capable of surveying 400,000 sq mi (1,000,000 km^{2}) in an eight-hour sortie; they were also used to sample the fallout from French nuclear tests conducted in the South Pacific. Originally reconnaissance Victors were equipped for visual reconnaissance; it was found to be cheaper to assign Canberra light bombers to this duty and the cameras were removed in 1970. Subsequently, radar-based reconnaissance was emphasised in the type's role. The reconnaissance Victors remained in use until 1974 when they followed the standard bombers into the tanker conversion line; a handful of modified Avro Vulcans assumed the maritime radar reconnaissance role in their place.

Both the Victor and the Vulcan played a high-profile role during the 1982 Falklands War. To cross the distance of the South Atlantic, a Vulcan required refuelling several times from Victor tankers. In Operation Black Buck three bombing sorties were flown against Argentine forces deployed to the Falklands, with approximately 1.1 million gal (5 million L) of fuel consumed in each mission. The flights held the record for the world's longest-distance bombing raids. The deployment of other assets to the theatre, such as the Hawker Siddeley Nimrod and Lockheed Hercules, required the support of the Victor tanker fleet, which had been temporarily moved to RAF Ascension Island for the campaign. The Victor also undertook several reconnaissance missions over the South Atlantic. These missions provided valuable intelligence for the retaking of South Georgia by British forces.

External videos
- Documentary on the Black Buck raids

Following the invasion of Kuwait by neighbouring Iraq in 1990, a total of eight Victor K.2s were deployed to Bahrain to provide flight refuelling to RAF and other coalition aircraft during the 1991 Gulf War. RAF strike aircraft such as the Panavia Tornado would frequently make use of the tanker to refuel prior to launching attacks inside Iraq. The remaining Victor fleet was retired in 1993, the last of the three V-bombers in operational service.

== Variants ==
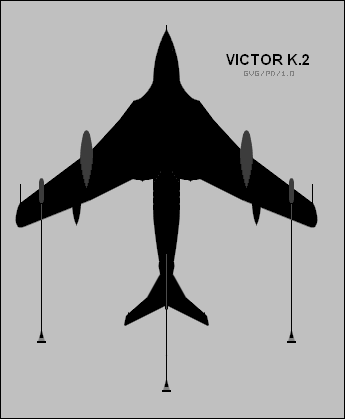
Ventral plan of a Victor K.2

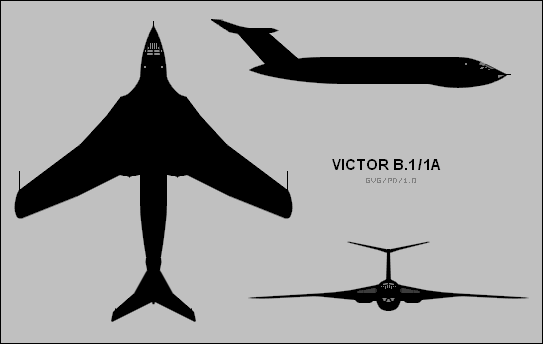
3-view of Victor B.1

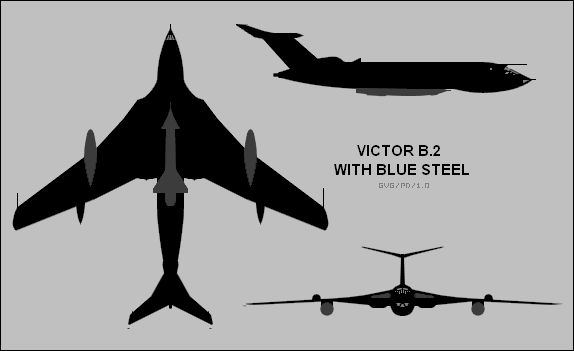
3-view of Victor B.2

HP.80
Prototype, two aircraft built.
Victor B.1
Strategic bomber aircraft, 50 built.
Victor B.1A
Strategic bomber aircraft, B.1 updated with Red Steer tail warning radar and ECM suite, 24 converted.
Victor B.1A (K.2P)
2-point in-flight refuelling tanker retaining bomber capability, six converted.
Victor BK.1
3-point in-flight refuelling tanker (renamed K.1 after bombing capability removed), 11 converted.
Victor BK.1A
3-point in-flight refuelling tanker (renamed K.1A as for K.1), 14 converted.
Victor B.2
Strategic bomber aircraft, 34 built.
Victor B.2RS
Blue Steel-capable aircraft with RCo.17 Conway 201 engines, 21 converted.
Victor B(SR).2
Strategic reconnaissance aircraft, nine converted.
Victor K.2
In-flight refuelling tanker. 24 converted from B.2 and B(SR).2.
HP.96
Proposed military transport of 1950 with new fuselage carrying 85 troops. Unbuilt.
HP.97
1950 civil airliner project. Not built.
HP.98
Proposed pathfinder version with remotely operated tail guns and powered by Conway engines. Rejected in favour of Valiant B.2.
HP.101
Proposed military transport version of HP.97. Not built.
HP.104
Proposed "Phase 3" bomber of 1955 powered by Bristol Olympus or Sapphire engines. Not built.
HP.111
1958 project for military or civil transport, powered by four Conway engines. Capacity for 200 troops in military version or 145 passengers in airliner in a double-decker fuselage.
HP.114
Proposed "Phase 6" bomber designed for standing patrols carrying two or four GAM-87 Skybolt ballistic missiles.
HP.123
Proposed military tactical transport based on HP.111 and fitted with blown flaps. Rejected in favour of Armstrong Whitworth AW.681.

== Operators ==
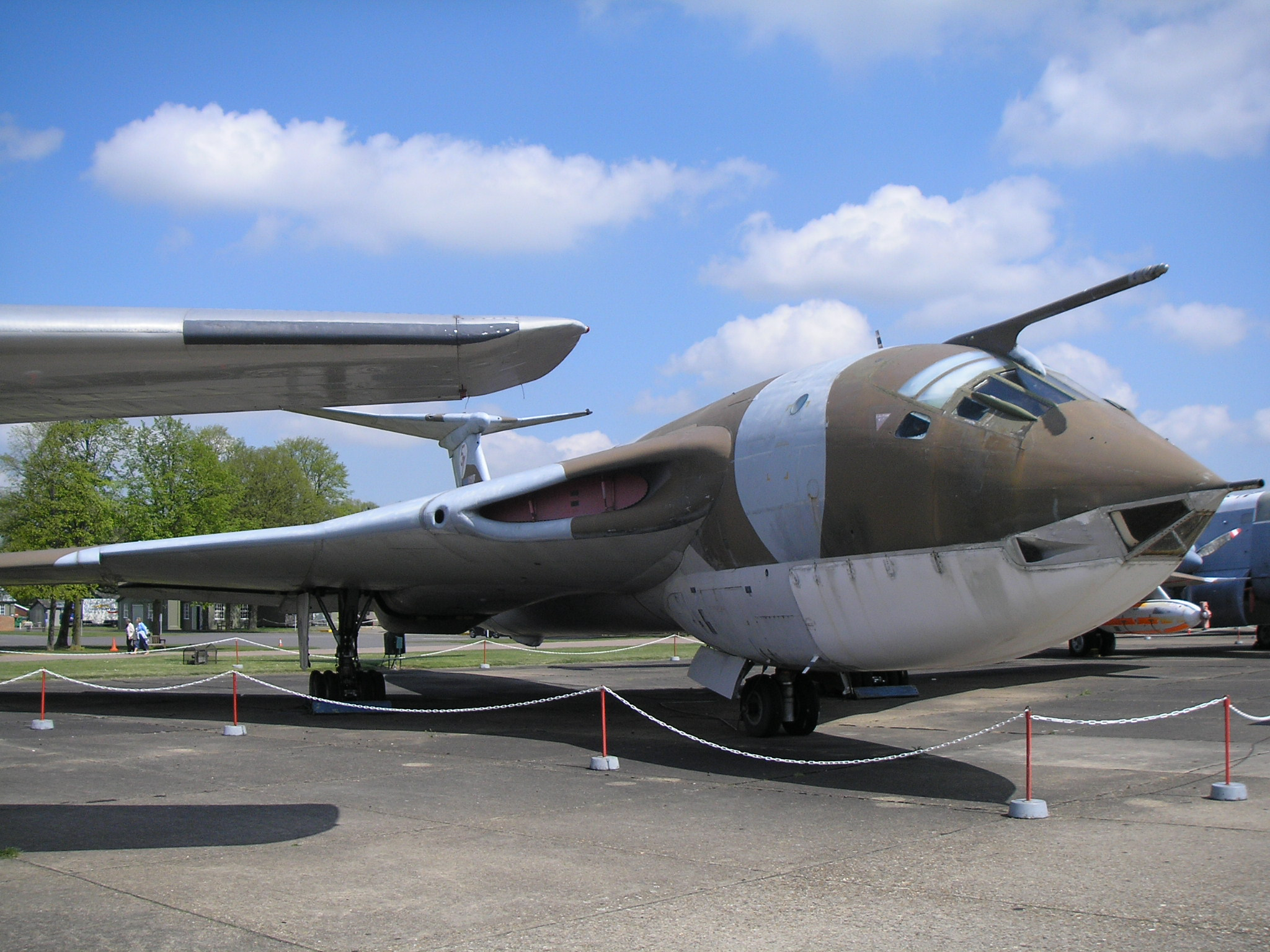
Victor B.1A (K.2P) XH648 on display at the Imperial War Museum Duxford in 2006, prior to its completed restoration in 2022

- Royal Air Force
  - No. 10 Squadron RAF operated B.1 from April 1958 to March 1964 at RAF Cottesmore.
  - No. 15 Squadron RAF operated B.1 from September 1958 to October 1964 at RAF Cottesmore.
  - No. 55 Squadron RAF operated B.1 and B.1As from RAF Honington from October 1960, moving to RAF Marham and receiving B.1(K)A tankers in May 1965. These were replaced by K.2 in July 1975, with the squadron continuing to operate Victors in the tanker role until disbanding in October 1993.
  - No. 57 Squadron RAF operated B.1As from RAF Honington from March 1959, moving to RAF Marham in December 1965 for conversion to K.1 and later K.2 tankers until disbanding in June 1986.
  - No. 100 Squadron RAF operated B.2s at RAF Wittering from May 1962 to September 1968.
  - No. 139 (Jamaica) Squadron RAF operated B.2s from RAF Wittering from February 1962 to December 1968.
  - No. 214 Squadron RAF operated K.1 tankers from RAF Marham from July 1966 to January 1977.
  - No. 543 Squadron RAF operated B(SR).2s from RAF Wyton from December 1965 to May 1974.
  - No. 232 Operational Conversion Unit RAF.
  - Radar Reconnaissance Flight RAF Wyton.

== Accidents and incidents ==
- 14 July 1954: WB771, the prototype HP.80, crashed during a test flight at Cranfield, England. All four crewmen died. The tailplane detached from the top of the fin.
- 16 April 1958: XA921, a B.1 undertaking Ministry of Supply trials, experienced a collapse of the rear bomb bay bulkhead while cycling the bomb bay doors, damaging hydraulic and electrical systems; the aircraft successfully returned to base. Following the incident, in-service Victors had restrictions put in place on the opening of the bomb doors until Modification 943 was applied to all aircraft.
- 20 August 1959: XH668, a B2 of the A&AEE, lost a pitot head and dived into the sea off Milford Haven, Pembrokeshire. More than 40 ships and 4,000 people were involved in the recovery of 600,000 pieces of the missing bomber, an exercise referred to as 'Operation Victor Search'.
- 19 June 1960: XH617, a B1A of 57 Squadron, caught fire in the air and was abandoned near Diss, Norfolk.
- 23 March 1962: XL159, a B2 of the A&AEE, stalled and dived into a house at Stubton, Lincolnshire.
- 14 June 1962: XH613, a B1A of 15 Squadron, lost power on all engines and was abandoned on approach to RAF Cottesmore.
- 16 June 1962: XA929, a B1 of 10 Squadron, overshot the runway and broke up at RAF Akrotiri following an aborted takeoff.
- 2 October 1962: XA934, a B1 of 'A' Squadron, 232 OCU, had an engine failure and deliberate shutdown of the adjacent engine on takeoff from RAF Gaydon. During the approach to land the other two engines flamed out. The aircraft crashed into a copse several miles from RAF Gaydon. Of the four crew on board only the co-pilot survived. The RAF accident record states the prime cause as mis-management of the fuel system and consequent fuel starvation of the two running engines.
- 20 March 1963: XM714, a B2 of 100 Squadron, stalled after takeoff from RAF Wittering.
- 29 June 1966: XM716, a SR2 of 543 Squadron, was giving a demonstration flight for the press and television at RAF Wyton. The aircraft had made one high-speed circuit and was flying low in a wide arc to return over the airfield when the starboard wing was seen to break away and both it and the rest of the aircraft burst into flames. All four crew were killed. The aircraft was the first SR2 to enter service with the squadron. The aircraft had exceeded its operational limitations causing overstressing.
- 19 August 1968: Victor K1 XH646 of 214 Squadron collided in midair near Holt, Norfolk, in bad weather, with a 213 Squadron English Electric Canberra WT325; all four crew members of the Victor died, as did all three on board the Canberra.
- 10 May 1973: XL230, a SR2 of 543 Squadron, bounced during landing at RAF Wyton and exploded.
- 24 March 1975: Victor K1A XH618 of 57 Squadron was involved in a midair collision with Blackburn Buccaneer XV156 during a simulated refuelling. The Buccaneer hit the Victor's tailplane, causing the Victor to crash into the sea 95 mi (153 km) east of Sunderland, Tyne and Wear; four crew were killed.
- 29 September 1976: XL513 a K2 of No 55 Squadron aborted take off and overshot the runway at RAF Marham after a bird strike. The crew escaped with no serious injuries. The aircraft caught fire and was damaged beyond repair.
- 15 October 1982: XL232, a K2 of No 55 Squadron, suffered an uncontained turbine failure early in the take-off run. The aircraft was stopped, and the crew evacuated the aircraft with no injuries. Debris from the turbine penetrated a fuselage fuel tank, starting an uncontrolled fire, destroying the aircraft and damaging the runway at RAF Marham.
- 19 June 1986: XL191, a K2 of 57 Squadron, undershot approach at Hamilton, Ontario.
- 29 February 1988: Landing accident at USAF Offutt; AB-hydraulic failure resulted in the aircraft running off the runway. As recorded and illustrated in Flypast, October 2008, p. 107, this resulted in 'I Ran Offut' artwork being applied to the crew door. Many of the USAF groundcrew at Offutt were Irish-American, so the tongue-in-cheek phrase is meant to be said in an Irish accent, 'I ran off it'.
- 3 May 2009: During a "fast taxi" run at Bruntingthorpe Aerodrome, XM715 (Teasin' Tina) made a brief unplanned flight, reaching a height of about 30 ft (9 m) at maximum, then carrying out a safe landing before the aircraft could reach the runway threshold. The aircraft did not have a permit to fly; however, the Civil Aviation Authority (CAA) stated that they would not be conducting an investigation. Teasin' Tina became airborne after the plane's co-pilot had failed to reply to the command "throttles back"; the pilot then had to control the throttles himself, the confusion temporarily disrupting firm control of the aircraft.

== Surviving aircraft ==
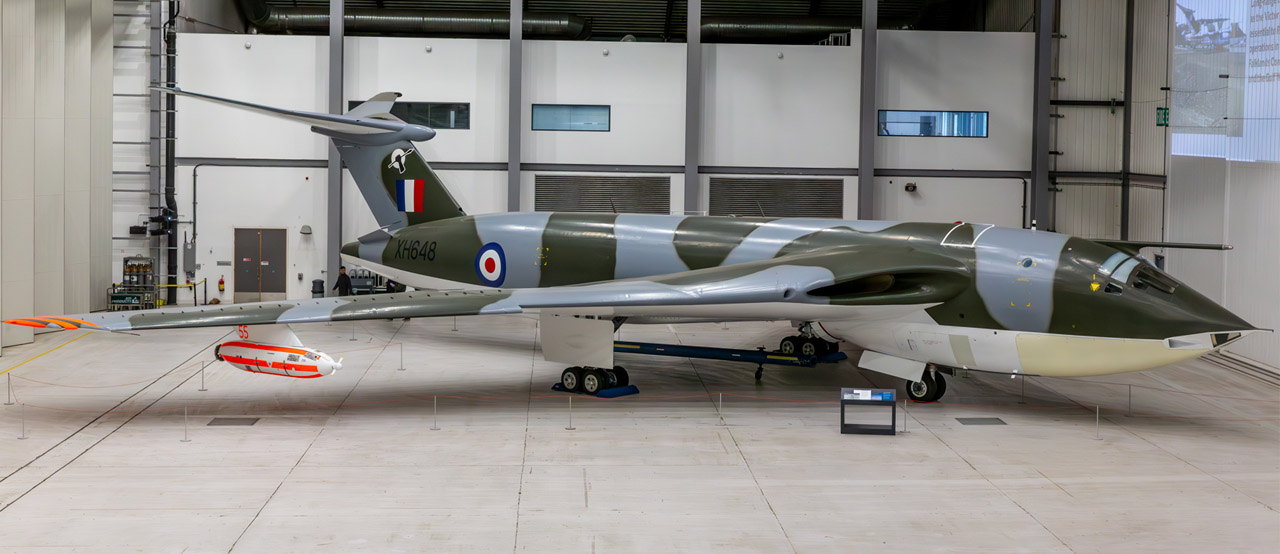
Victor XH648, 2023

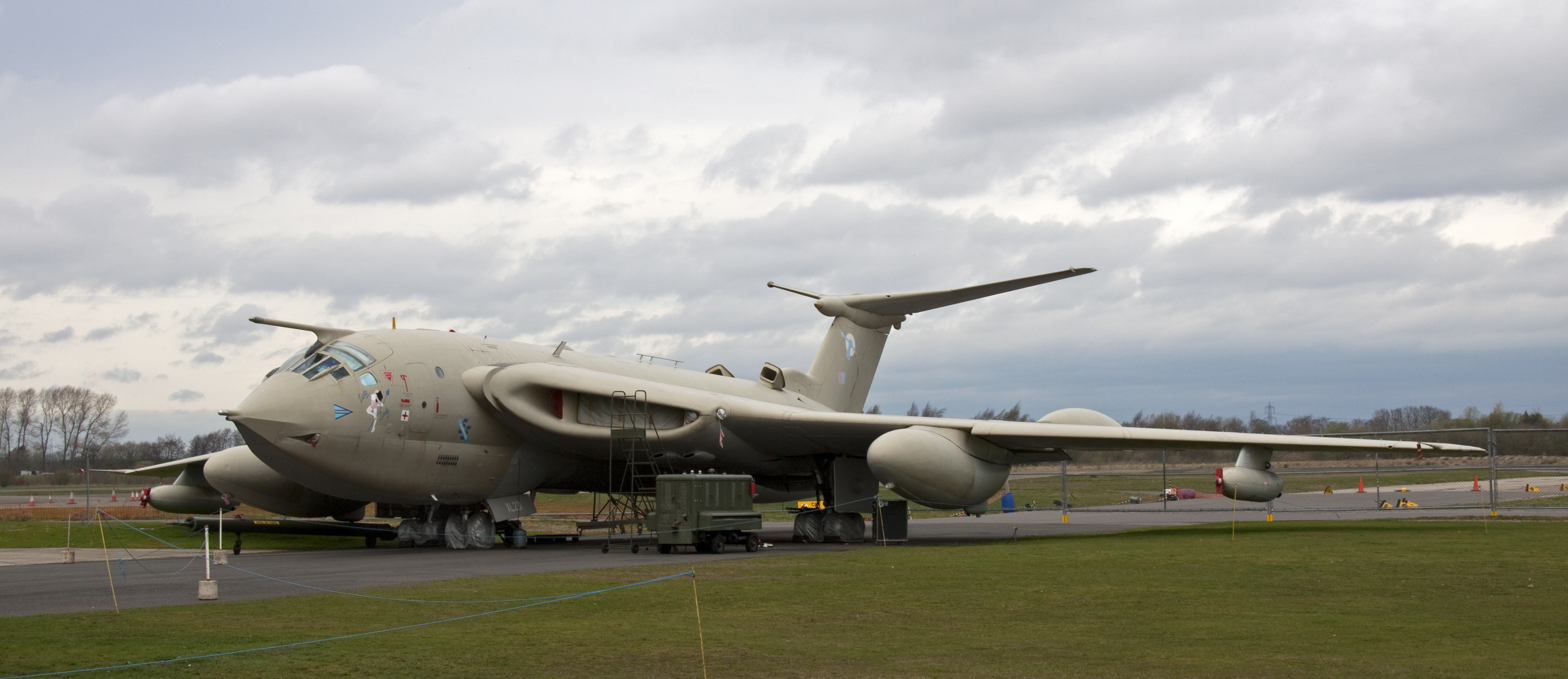
Victor XL231 Lusty Lindy, 2011

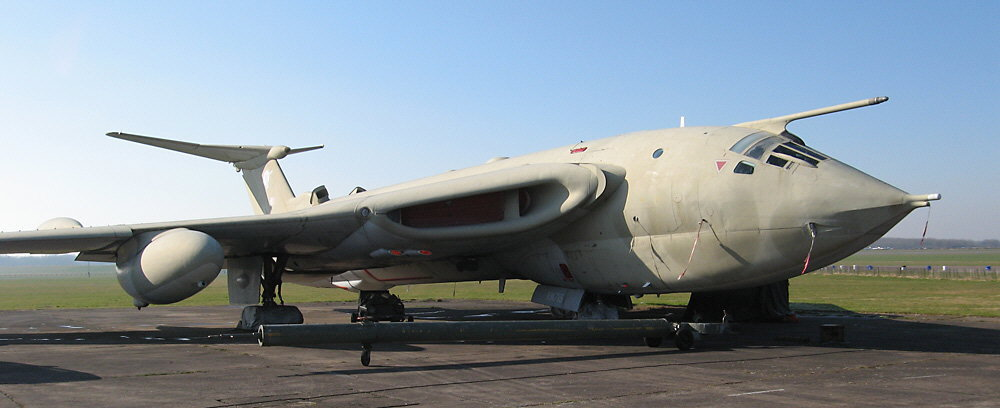
Victor XM715 Teasin' Tina, 2008

A total of four Victors have survived and are on display in the United Kingdom. None are flightworthy.

- Victor B.1A XH648: a B.1A (K.2P) at the Imperial War Museum Duxford, Cambridgeshire. This is the sole B.1 to survive. This aircraft is on display following a five year restoration project, which was formally completed in September 2022.
- Victor K.2 XH672: Maid Marian, at the Royal Air Force Museum Midlands, Cosford, Shropshire, in the National Cold War Exhibition.
- Victor K.2 XL231: Lusty Lindy, at the Yorkshire Air Museum, York. The prototype for the B.2 to K.2 conversion.
- Victor K.2 XM715: Teasin' Tina/Victor Meldrew, taxiable at the Cold War Jets Collection, Bruntingthorpe Aerodrome, Leicestershire. XM715, during a fast taxi demonstration, inadvertently left the ground and carried out an unplanned flight at Bruntingthorpe Aerodrome in 2009.

A fifth airframe, Victor K.2 XH673: A K.2 served as Gate guardian at RAF Marham when retired in 1993, but in early 2020 she was offered up for disposal, with the word being that she was in a structurally unsafe condition. In spite of preservation attempts as of December 2020 most of the airframe had been scrapped. In February 2021, the RAF released the time-lapse footage of this airframe being dismantled.

== Specifications (Handley Page Victor B.1) ==
3 view of Victor

Data from Handley Page Aircraft since 1907

General characteristics

- Crew: 5
- Length: 114 ft 11 in (35.03 m)
- Wingspan: 110 ft (34 m)
- Height: 28 ft 1.5 in (8.573 m)
- Wing area: 2,406 sq ft (223.5 m^{2})
- Airfoil: Root: 16% Modified RAE Airfoil; Tip: 6% Modified RAE Airfoil
- Empty weight: 89,030 lb (40,383 kg)
- Max takeoff weight: 205,000 lb (92,986 kg)
- Powerplant: 4 × Armstrong Siddeley A.S.Sa.7 Sapphire turbojet engines, 11,050 lbf (49.2 kN) thrust each

Performance

- Maximum speed: 545 kn (627 mph, 1,009 km/h) at 36,000 ft (11,000 m)
- Range: 5,217 nmi (6,004 mi, 9,662 km)
- Service ceiling: 56,000 ft (17,000 m)
- Thrust/weight: 0.216 (at MTOW)

Armament

- Bombs: ** Up to 35 × 1,000 lb (450 kg) bombs or
  - 1 × Yellow Sun free-fall nuclear bomb

== Notable appearances in media ==
A 1964 Gerhard Richter painting titled XL 513 depicts Victor K.2, which was lost in a 1976 accident at RAF Marham.

== See also ==
Related development

- Handley Page HP.88, British research aircraft

Aircraft of comparable role, configuration, and era

- Avro Vulcan
- Boeing B-47 Stratojet
- Short Sperrin
- Tupolev Tu-16/Xian H-6
- Vickers Valiant

Related lists

- List of tanker aircraft
- List of aircraft of the Royal Air Force
- List of V Bomber dispersal bases
