= Hazel (surname) =

Hazel is a surname.

Notable people with the name include:

- Alfred Hazel (1869–1944), British Member of Parliament and academic
- Eddie Hazel (1950–1992), American singer and funk guitarist
- John Hazel (footballer), Scottish former footballer
- John R. Hazel (1860–1951), American judge
- John T. "Til" Hazel (1930–2022), American businessman and lawyer
- Nancy Hazel, British scientist in social work
- William Augustus Hazel (1854–1929), African-American architect and stained glass artist

== See also ==
- Hazle (disambiguation)
