= No. 543 Squadron RAF =

Defunct flying squadron of the Royal Air Force

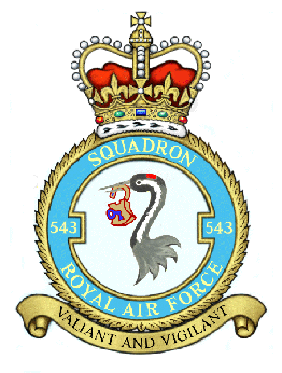
- Squadron badge
- Active: 19 October 1942 – 18 October 1943; 24 September 1955 – 24 May 1974
- Country: United Kingdom
- Branch: Royal Air Force
- Role: Photographic Reconnaissance
- Part of: No. 16 Group, RAF Coastal Command (42–43); No. 3 Group, RAF Bomber Command (55–68); No. 1 Group, RAF Strike Command (68–74)
- Mottos: Valiant and Vigilant

Insignia
- Squadron Badge heraldry: A crane's head, the crane carrying an open padlock, with key, in its beak
- Squadron Codes: No codes are known to have been carried

No. 543 Squadron RAF was a photographic reconnaissance squadron of the Royal Air Force, active in two periods between 1942 and 1974.

== History ==
The squadron was formed on 19 October 1942 at RAF Benson as a photo-reconnaissance unit with the Supermarine Spitfire. A detachment was stationed at RAF St Eval, Cornwall to carry out reconnaissance flights over France. The rest of the squadron carried out operational training. On 18 October 1943 the squadron was disbanded.

On 24 September 1955 the squadron was reformed at RAF Gaydon to operate the Vickers Valiant for reconnaissance duties. It moved to RAF Wyton in November 1955. The squadron's official war role was to carry out pre- and post-strike reconnaissance in support of the RAF's nuclear-armed V-bombers, although the post-strike bomb damage assessment mission was soon abandoned as impracticable in a nuclear war. The squadron carried out frequent long-range survey flights, including mapping Thailand in 1959 and 1961 in Operation Segment, and surveying Northern Rhodesia, Southern Rhodesia and Bechuanaland (now Zambia, Zimbabwe and Botswana respectively) in 1964 in Operation Pontifex. Other photo survey duties were carried out to aid relief efforts following natural disasters, with Valiants despatched to survey the damage following the 1960 Agadir earthquake and mapped British Honduras in December 1961 following the devastating Hurricane Hattie. The squadron also carried out Maritime Reconnaissance over the North Atlantic, Norwegian and Barents Seas. In 1964, the Valiant developed metal fatigue problems, with one of the squadron's Valiants was found to have a cracked wing spar in July 1964 during Operation Pontifex. Inspection of the squadron's aircraft in October 1964 found that only two of eight were fit for further service. The RAF's Valiant fleet, including No. 543's aircraft, were grounded on 26 January 1965.

The squadron re-equipped with the Handley Page Victor in 1965, receiving its first Victor B(SR)2 on 19 May 1965 and reaching its full strength of eight aircraft by April 1966. The squadron's Victors increasingly concentrated on the Maritime Radar Reconnaissance role, as photographic duties could be carried out for less money by the RAF's English Electric Canberras, but the Victors' cameras were retained until 1974. The squadron had a secondary role of air sampling This involved flying through plumes of airborne contamination and using onboard equipment to collect fallout released from French and Chinese nuclear tests for later analysis at the Atomic Weapons Research Establishment at Aldermaston. The squadron also found time to enter two Victors in the May 1969 Daily Mail Trans-Atlantic Air Race. It was disbanded on 24 May 1974 at RAF Wyton.

The squadron conducted Ferret missions, for the UK, throughout the late 1960s and early 1970s.

== Aircraft operated ==
Aircraft operated by 543 Squadron, RAF
From	To	Aircraft	Version
October 1942	October 1943	Supermarine Spitfire	Mks.IV & V
November 1942	October 1943	Supermarine Spitfire	Mk.IX
June 1943	October 1943	de Havilland Mosquito	PR.IV
June 1955	December 1964	Vickers Valiant	B(PR).1
February 1956	December 1964	Vickers Valiant	B(PR)K.1
May 1965	December 1965	Handley Page Victor	B.1
January 1966	May 1974	Handley Page Victor	B.2(SR)

== Commanding officers ==
Commanding officers of 543 Squadron, RAF
From	To	Name
October 1942	October 1942	S/Ldr. A.E. Hill DSO, DFC & Bar
October 1942	February 1943	S/Ldr. G.E. Hughes DFC
February 1943	August 1943	S/Ldr. F.A. Robinson DFC
September 1943	October 1943	F/Lt. R.C. Cusson
September 1955	August 1957	W/Cdr. R.E. Havercroft AFC
August 1957	September 1959	W/Cdr. R. Berry DSO, OBE, DFC
September 1959	January 1962	W/Cdr. C.J. StD. Jeffries DFC
January 1962	December 1963	W/Cdr. B. Hamilton OBE, DFC, AFC
December 1963	February 1966	W/Cdr. A.W. Tarry
February 1966		W/Cdr. R.H. McV. Redfern

== Squadron bases ==
Bases and airfields used by 543 Squadron, RAF
From	To	Base	Remark
19 October 1942	18 October 1943	RAF Benson, Oxfordshire	Detachments at RAF St Eval, Cornwall; RAF Mount Farm, Oxfordshire; Grasnaya and Vaenga, Russia
1 July 1955	18 November 1955	RAF Gaydon, Warwickshire	
18 November 1955	23 March 1970	RAF Wyton, Cambridgeshire	
23 March 1970	1 October 1970	RAF Honington, Suffolk	
1 October 1970	24 May 1974	RAF Wyton, Cambridgeshire	Disbanded here

== See also ==
- List of Royal Air Force aircraft squadrons
