= List of V Bomber dispersal bases =

In its early years, the British V bomber force relied on the concept of aircraft dispersal to escape the effects of an enemy attack on their main bases. There were 22 such bases in 1962, in addition to the ten main bases making a total of 32 bases available for the V bomber force.

In times of heightened international tension the V bomber force, already loaded with their nuclear weapons, could be flown to the dispersal bases where they could be kept at a few minutes readiness to take-off. The bases were situated around the United Kingdom in such a way that a nuclear strike by an attacking state could not be guaranteed to knock out all of Britain's ability to retaliate. However, except during exercises, the dispersal bases, capable of taking two to four aircraft each, were never used. During the Cuban Missile Crisis of 1962, Prime Minister Harold Macmillan declined to order the dispersal of the V-Force because he believed the Soviets would view this as provocative. The bombers were instead held at 15-minute readiness at their main bases.

The dispersal bases are mentioned in the opening titles of the 1965 Peter Watkins documentary The War Game.

== Types ==
Dispersal types include:

- Operational Readiness Platform (ORP): Usually a group of 4 aircraft pans attached to the runway where aircraft can taxi in and out without the use of a tug
- Dispersal Airfield: Group of 4 aircraft pans where aircraft can taxi in and out without the use of a tug, usually with additional support buildings
- Home Station "H": Group of 4 aircraft pans in the shape of the letter "H" where aircraft cannot taxi in and out without the use of a tug
- Home Station Looped "H": Group of 4 aircraft pans in the shape of the letter "H" where aircraft can taxi in and out without the use of a tug, usually with additional support buildings

== Main bases ==
Base	Location	Co-ordinates	Dispersal type	Notes
RAF Coningsby	Lincolnshire, England	53°05′45″N 000°08′55″W	ORP & Home Station "H"	
RAF Cottesmore	Rutland, England	52°44′36″N 000°38′09″W	ORP & Home Station "H" & Home Station Looped "H"	
RAF Finningley	South Yorkshire, England	53°29′05″N 000°59′59″W	ORP & Home Station "H" & Home Station Looped "H"	
RAF Gaydon	Warwickshire, England	52°11′11″N 001°28′59″W	ORP & Home Station "H"	
RAF Honington	Suffolk, England	52°20′37″N 000°47′27″E	ORP & Home Station Looped "H"	
RAF Marham	Norfolk, England	52°39′13″N 000°33′58″E	ORP & Home Station Looped "H"	
RAF Scampton	Lincolnshire, England	53°18′56″N 000°32′17″W	ORP & Home Station "H" & Home Station Looped "H"	
RAF Waddington	Lincolnshire, England	53°10′33″N 000°30′59″W	ORP & Home Station "H"	
RAF Wittering	Cambridgeshire, England	52°36′55″N 000°27′32″W	ORP & Home Station "H"	(HQ RAF Bomber Command)
RAF Wyton	Cambridgeshire, England	52°21′28″N 000°05′31″W	ORP & Home Station "H" & Home Station Looped "H"	

== Dispersal bases ==
=== Scotland ===
Base	Location	Co-ordinates	Dispersal type	Notes
Prestwick Airport	Ayrshire, Scotland	55°30′41″N 004°35′10″W	2 bay ORP	
RAF Machrihanish	Argyll and Bute, Scotland	55°26′01″N 005°39′54″W	2 bay ORP	
RAF Kinloss	Moray, Scotland	57°38′39″N 003°34′09″W	4 bay ORP	
RNAS Lossiemouth	Moray, Scotland	57°42′53″N 003°19′27″W	Dispersed Airfield & 2 bay ORP	(later transferred to the RAF)
RAF Leuchars	Fife, Scotland	56°22′25″N 002°52′48″W	2 x 2 bay ORP	

=== Northern Ireland ===
Base	Location	Co-ordinates	Dispersal type	Notes
RAF Aldergrove	Country Antrim, Northern Ireland	54°39′04″N 006°13′05″W	Nil	
RAF Ballykelly	County Londonderry, Northern Ireland	55°03′50″N 007°00′19″W	4 bay ORP	

=== England ===
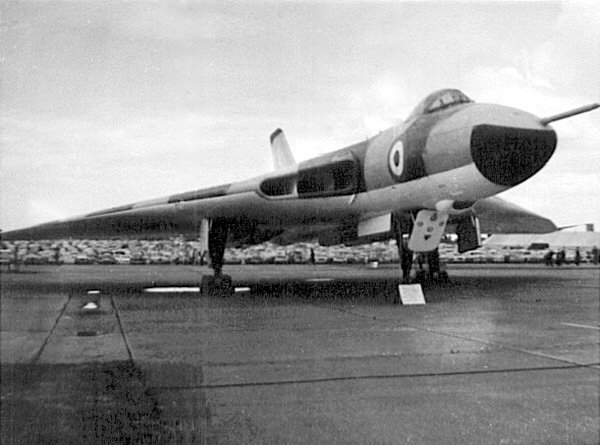
An Avro Vulcan B1A V bomber parked on one of the rapid dispersal points at Filton during a public air display in the 1960s

Base	Location	Co-ordinates	Dispersal type	Notes
RAE Bedford	Bedfordshire, England	52°14′03″N 000°26′35″W	Dispersed Airfield	
A&AEE Boscombe Down	Wiltshire, England	51°09′15″N 001°44′02″W	Dispersed Airfield & ORP	
RAF Bruntingthorpe	Leicestershire, England	52°29′55″N 001°06′52″W	Nil	
RAF Burtonwood	Cheshire, England	53°24′57″N 002°37′54″W	4 bay ORP	
RAF Carnaby	East Riding of Yorkshire, England	54°03′36″N 000°15′20″W	Nil	
RAF Cranwell	Lincolnshire, England	53°01′42″N 000°28′45″W	2 x 2 bay ORP & Dispersed Airfield	
RAF Coltishall	Norfolk, England	52°45′45″N 001°21′56″E	2 x 2 bay ORP	
RAF Elvington	North Yorkshire, England	53°55′25″N 000°58′20″W	Nil	
Filton Airport	Gloucestershire, England	51°31′28″N 002°34′40″W	Dispersed Airfield	
RAF Kemble	Gloucestershire, England	51°40′12″N 002°02′43″W	Nil	
RAF Leconfield	East Riding of Yorkshire, England	53°52′59″N 000°26′19″W	2 x 2 bay ORP & Dispersed Airfield	
RAF Leeming	North Yorkshire, England	54°17′18″N 001°32′11″W	1 x 2 bay ORP & Dispersed Airfield	
RAF Lyneham	Wiltshire, England	51°30′13″N 001°59′51″W	Dispersed Airfield	
RAF Manston	Kent, England	51°20′24″N 001°21′49″E	Nil	
RAF Middleton St George	County Durham, England	54°30′47″N 001°24′34″W	2 x 2 bay ORP & Dispersed Airfield	
RRE Pershore	Worcestershire, England	52°08′22″N 002°02′53″W	2 x 2 bay ORP & Dispersed Airfield	
RAF Shawbury	Shropshire, England	52°47′59″N 002°40′22″W	Dispersed Airfield	
London Stansted Airport	Essex, England	51°53′03″N 000°13′43″E	Nil	
RAF St Mawgan	Cornwall, England	50°26′29″N 005°00′24″W	Nil	
RAF Tarrant Rushton	Dorset, England	50°51′06″N 002°04′35″W	Nil	
RAF Wattisham	Suffolk, England	52°07′14″N 000°56′43″E	2 x 2 bay ORP	
RNAS Yeovilton	Somerset, England	51°00′31″N 002°37′52″W	2 bay ORP	

=== Wales ===
Base	Location	Co-ordinates	Dispersal type	Notes
RNAS Brawdy	Pembrokeshire, Wales	51°53′21″N 005°07′05″W	2 bay ORP	(later transferred to RAF)
RAE Llanbedr	Gwynedd, Wales	52°48′51″N 004°07′50″W	2 bay ORP	
RAF Valley	Anglesey, Wales	53°14′26″N 004°31′19″W	2 bay ORP	

== See also ==
- List of UK Thor missile bases
- List of Royal Air Force stations
- Four-minute warning
