= Hazel Creek =

Hazel Creek may refer to the following places in the United States:

- Hazel Creek, California, a town and a stream
- Hazel Creek (Soque River tributary), Georgia
- Hazel Creek (Courtois Creek tributary), Missouri
- Hazel Creek (Littleby Creek tributary), Missouri
- Hazel Creek (Great Smoky Mountains), North Carolina
- Hazel Creek (Lehigh River), Pennsylvania
