= Kent Family Placement Project =

The Kent Family Placement Project (also known as the "Kent Project") was initiated in 1975 by Nancy Hazel, noted author and previous Research Fellow with the University of Kent department of Social Work.

== History ==
In 1974, a Council of Europe-commissioned working group of international researchers completed a report on child placement practices. At the conclusion of the study, Hazel embarked on another study of her own which focused on Sweden and Belgium. Conventional wisdom in England at the time surmised that adolescents were unfit for foster care. Adolescents were perceived as being too old, tempestuous, or unhealthy.

The only solution available involved the institutionalisation of such children by way of alternative or boarding schools. Adolescents languished in restrictive and single-sex residential care.

To address this problem, made a rather controversial proposal; putting teenagers into foster care instead of residential care. The idea encountered a fair amount of resistance, because it went against conventional wisdom.

The Kent Family Placement Project was designed to keep looked-after children with family and friends, encourage participation of the looked-after child with their caregivers, as well as offering compensation and proper training to foster carers for their work.
