= Hazell =

Hazell is a surname of British origin, and may refer to:

== People ==
- Andrea Hazell, Canadian politician
- Andy Hazell (born 1978), British rugby player
- Bert Hazell (1907–2009), British politician
- Bob Hazell (born 1959), British football player
- Charles Hazell, Canadian architect
- Danielle Hazell (born 1988), British cricketer
- Darrell Hazell (born 1964), American football coach
- Eileen Hazell (1903–1984), Canadian sculptor and potter
- Heidi Hazell (1962–1989), German murder victim
- Horace Hazell (1909–1990), British cricketer
- Hy Hazell (1919–1970), British actress
- Jeremy Hazell (born 1986), American basketball player
- Keeley Hazell (born 1986), British glamour model
- Malcolm Hazell (born 1948), Australian public servant
- Reuben Hazell (born 1979), British football player
- Tim Hazell (born 1981), Australian football player
- Tom F. Hazell (1892–1946), British fighter pilot
- Tony Hazell (born 1947), British football player

== Fictional characters ==
- James Hazell, in the British television series Hazell
- Thorpe Hazell, in stories by Victor Whitechurch

== Companies ==
- Hazell Bros, Australian construction company

== See also ==
- Hazel (disambiguation)
