= Hazel Creek (Littleby Creek tributary) =

Stream in the American state of Missouri

Coordinates: 39.2842065°N 91.7801642°W

Hazel Creek is a stream in Audrain County in the U.S. state of Missouri. It is a tributary of Littleby Creek.

Hazel Creek was named for the hazel along its course.

== See also ==
- List of rivers of Missouri
