= Ronald Berry (RAF officer) =

British flying ace of WWII

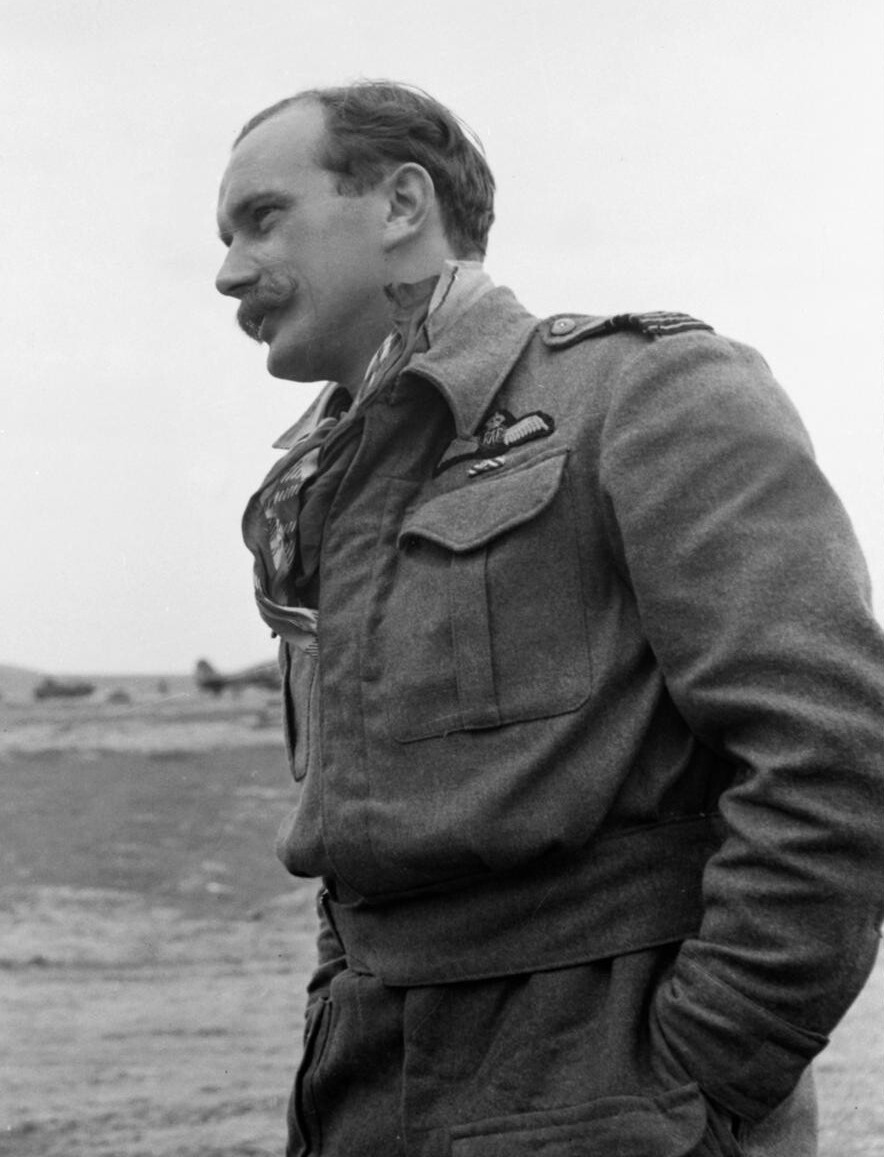
- Berry, 1943
- Born: 3 May 1917; Kingston upon Hull, United Kingdom
- Died: September 2000 (aged 83); Hornsea, United Kingdom
- Military career
- Allegiance: United Kingdom
- Branch: Royal Air Force
- Service years: 1939–1969
- Rank: Air Commodore
- Nickname: 'Ras'
- Commands: No. 81 Squadron; No. 322 Wing; No. 543 Squadron
- Conflicts: Second World War: Battle of Britain; Circus offensive; Operation Torch
- Awards: Commander of the Order of the British Empire; Distinguished Service Order; Distinguished Flying Cross & Bar

Air Commodore Ronald Berry, CBE, DSO, DFC & Bar (3 May 1917 – September 2000) was a British flying ace and senior officer of the Royal Air Force (RAF) during the Second World War and the postwar period. During his service with the RAF, he was credited with shooting down at least fourteen aircraft with several more shared with other pilots.

Born in Kingston upon Hull, Berry joined the Royal Air Force Volunteer Reserve in 1937 and was called up for service in the RAF upon the outbreak of the Second World War. Posted to No. 603 Squadron, he flew extensively in the Battle of Britain during which he achieved a number of his aerial victories. For much of 1941 he served as a fighter controller at Turnhouse. Given command of No. 81 Squadron early the following year, he led it through the campaign in North Africa through late 1942 to early 1943, switching to leading No. 322 Wing in March. He returned to the United Kingdom and spent the remainder of the war in training and staff posts. Remaining in the RAF in the postwar period, he served in a variety of roles with Fighter Command, Bomber Command and the Air Ministry. He ended his military career in early 1969, having reached the rank of air commodore. He retired to Hornsea and died in September 2000, aged 83.

== Early life ==
Ronald Berry was born on 3 May 1917 in the city of Kingston upon Hull, in the United Kingdom. He went to school at Riley High School before going onto to Hull Technical Institute. Once his education was completed, he worked for the Hull City Council. He joined the Royal Air Force Volunteer Reserve in April 1937, learning to fly at No. 4 Elementary & Reserve Flying Training School at Brough Aerodrome. Seconded to No. 66 Squadron in early 1939 for a three-week period, flying Supermarine Spitfire fighters, he was called up on the commencement of the Second World War.

== Second World War ==
Initially holding the rank of sergeant, Berry, who was nicknamed 'Ras', spent the first weeks of the war attending a gunnery school before being posted to No. 603 Squadron in mid-October 1939. His new squadron, of the Royal Auxiliary Air Force, was based at Turnhouse and was equipped with Spitfires. A month and a half after his arrival at the squadron, Berry was granted a commission as a pilot officer on probation. By this time, he was part of a detachment based at Montrose and on 7 December, intercepted a Heinkel He 111 medium bomber south east of the airfield, claiming it as damaged.

No. 603 Squadron remained based in Scotland for the next several months, performing patrolling duties. On 30 June 1940, Berry damaged a Junkers Ju 88 medium bomber and four days later shared in the destruction of another Ju 88 south east of Aberdeen. With two other pilots, he combined to destroy a Dornier Do 17 medium bomber 75 miles (121 km) east of Aberdeen on 23 July and a week later, flying to the south east of the airfield at Montrose, shared in shooting down a He 111.

=== Battle of Britain ===
In August, No. 603 Squadron shifted south to Hornchurch to join No. 11 Group, heavily engaged in the Battle of Britain. Berry flew extensively through late-August and into September. He probably destroyed a Messerschmitt Bf 109 fighter and damaged a second on 28 August over the southeast coastline near Dover. A pair of Bf 109s was shot down by Berry over Dover on 31 August. In a subsequent sortie later in the day, he destroyed a Bf 109 near Hornchurch. On 1 September he shared in the destruction of a Bf 109 over Canterbury and, the next day, damaged another near Chatham. Flying north of Ford on 9 September, he engaged and damaged a He 111. Two days later he encountered a Messerschmitt Bf 110 heavy fighter south of London, claiming it as damaged.

On 15 September, later known as Battle of Britain Day, the Luftwaffe mounted a large scale attack on the south east of England. Berry claimed two Bf 109s as probably destroyed, near Dungeness and Chatham respectively, and also shot down a Do 17 in the latter area. He probably destroyed a Bf 109 over Chatham on two days later and on 27 September shot down two of the same type over Gravesend, one shared with another pilot. The same day, he claimed the probable destruction of a further Bf 109 in the same area. At the end of the month, Berry destroyed two more Bf 109s over Biggin Hill. The Luftwaffe began to ease its offensive during October and the pace of operations slowed. For his successes in the preceding weeks, Berry was recommended for the Distinguished Flying Cross (DFC) and this was duly awarded. The official announcement was made in The London Gazette on 25 October, and the published citation read:

Pilot Officer Berry has personally destroyed six enemy aircraft, and assisted in the destruction of several others. Through innumerable engagements with the enemy he has shown the greatest gallantry and determination in pressing home his attacks at close range. The skill and dash with which this officer has led his section have done much to assure their successes.

— London Gazette, No. 34978, 25 October 1940

Despite its reduction in operations, the Luftwaffe was still active and on 27 October, Berry engaged and damaged a Bf 109 near Dover. In an engagement on 7 November he, together with three other pilots, engaged and destroyed a Bf 110 to the north of Rochford. The following day, he reported having engaged a Heinkel He 113 fighter east of Dover, claiming it as damaged. This was actually a Bf 109 and on 17 November, flying north of the Thames Estuary destroyed a fighter of this type. On 23 November, the Corpo Aereo Italiano (the Italian Air Corps) mounted one of its few raids against the south east of England, and No. 603 Squadron, which was now equipped with the Spitfire Mk IIa, was involved in its interception; during the resulting engagement, Berry shot down one Fiat CR.42 Falco biplane fighter and probably destroyed a second.

In December, No. 603 Squadron shifted back to Scotland, based at Drem from where it carried out convoy patrols. By this time Berry had been promoted to flying officer, and the following month he was appointed commander of one of the squadron's flights as an acting flight lieutenant. In April 1941 he left the squadron, being assigned to the RAF station at Turnhouse to serve as a fighter controller.

=== North Africa ===
In December 1941, Berry was promoted to acting squadron leader and at the start of the following year he was given command of No. 81 Squadron. His new unit had just returned from service in the Soviet Union and was based at Turnhouse and operating Spitfire Mk Va fighters. It flew patrols over the North Sea but saw no action until in May, when it moved south to Hornchurch to join the fighter wing there. It regularly flew bomber escort missions to France and the Low Countries as well as fighter sweeps intended to draw out the Luftwaffe.

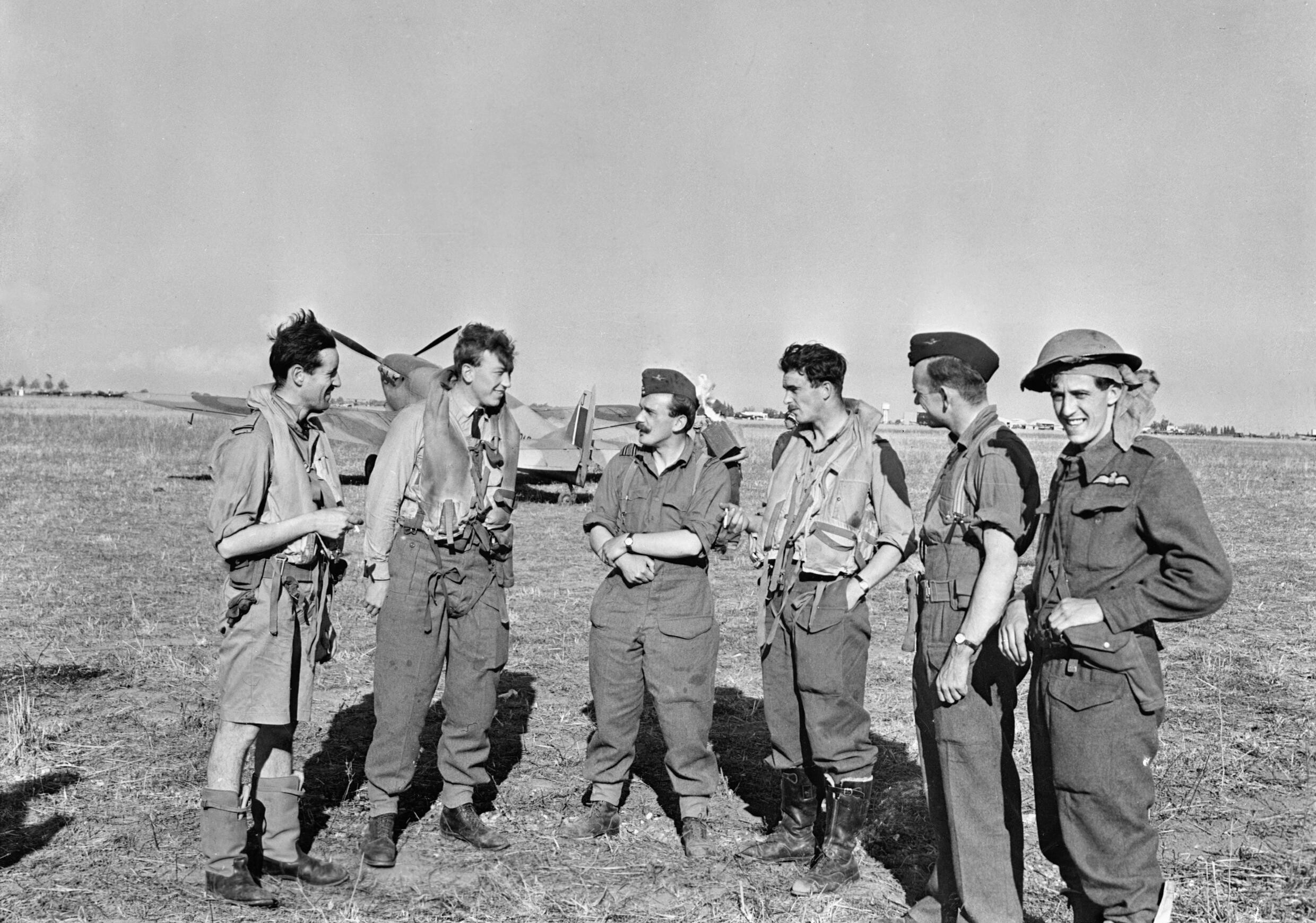
Berry stands third left in a group of fighter pilots of No. 81 Squadron, November 1942 at Maison Blanche

In October 1942, No. 81 Squadron was transferred to North Africa via Gibraltar, where the pilots collected Spitfire Mk Vcs. On 8 November, the day of Operation Torch, the Allied invasion of French Algeria, these were flown to the airfield at Maison Blanche. The next day, the squadron went into action, attacking a number of Luftwaffe bombers over Oran. Berry shot down one Ju 88, shared in the destruction of another Ju 88 and a He 111. A total of eleven bombers were claimed as destroyed by the squadron.

Berry damaged a Ju 88 on 11 November and then damaged an Italian Macchi C.202 Folgore fighter three days later. On 26 November, flying over Bone, he damaged two Bf 109s. In the same area on 28 November he and another pilot engaged and destroyed a Bf 109. He shared in the shooting down of a Focke-Wulf Fw 190 fighter on 3 December, also over Bone, and claimed sole credit for destroying a Fw 190 over Tebourba on 6 December. He shot down a Savoia-Marchetti SM.79 medium bomber on 10 December.

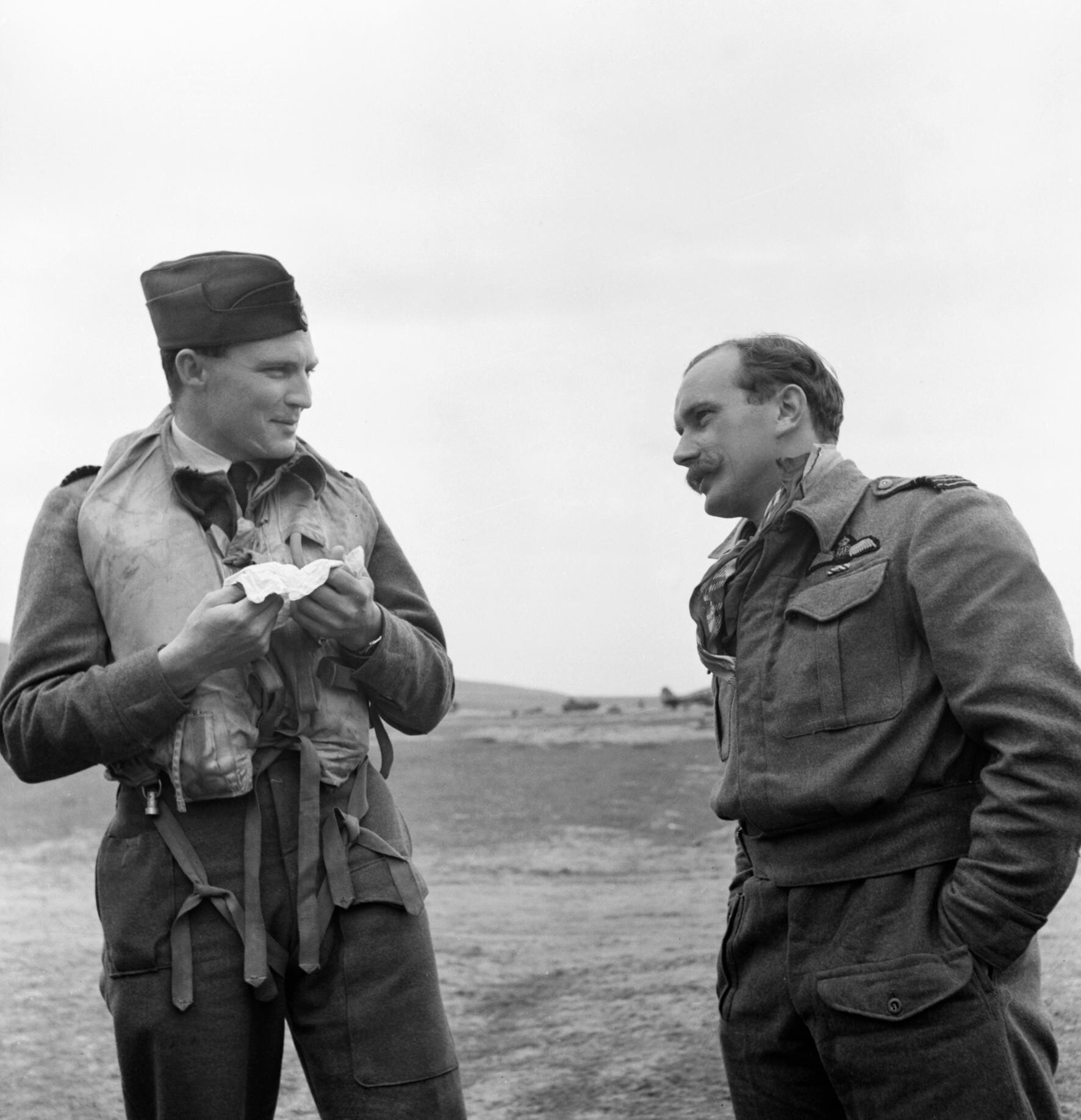
Ronald Berry, on the right, with his predecessor as commander of No. 322 Wing, Group Captain Petrus Hugo

On 22 January 1943, Berry was appointed commander of No. 322 Wing, succeeding Petrus Hugo, and on the last day of the month he destroyed a Bf 109 near Cap Rosa. He destroyed another Bf 109 on 25 February, this time over Bone. The announcement of the award of a Bar to his DFC on 2 March was the same day that he claimed a Bf 109 as probably destroyed over Mateur. He damaged a Fw 190 on 3 April, and then a Junkers Ju 87 dive bomber on 5 April. A week later he engaged a Bf 109 in the area around Enfidaville, and it was subsequently claimed as probably destroyed. He damaged Bf 109s on 25 and 26 April, caught and destroyed a Junkers Ju 52 transport aircraft on the ground on 6 May and then destroyed six Bf 109s the following day, all on the ground.

With the Tunisian campaign concluded by mid-May 1943, Berry was awarded the Distinguished Service Order (DSO) the following month. The published citation read:

In the campaign in North Africa, this officer participated in a large number of sorties and displayed great skill and leadership. In addition he has displayed excellent organising ability, which has contributed materially to the success of the wing he commands. Wing Commander Berry has destroyed 17 enemy aircraft.

— London Gazette, No. 36036, 1 June 1943

=== Later war service ===
Berry returned to the United Kingdom and took up an instructing role, as Wing Commander Flying at an Operational Training Unit at Kirton in Lindsey. He subsequently took courses at the Staff College at Bracknell and the Fighter Leaders' School, where he finished the war. By this time he was credited with having shot down fourteen aircraft, with ten more shared with other pilots. He is also credited with nine aircraft probably destroyed, seventeen damaged, and seven destroyed on the ground.

== Postwar service ==
In the immediate postwar period, Berry was tasked with establishing the Central Fighter Establishment at Tangmere, and then took up a post as station commander at Acklington. In the 1946 New Year Honours, Berry was appointed an officer of the Order of the British Empire. He was posted to the headquarters of Fighter Command's No. 12 Group later in the year in a staff role. In 1947, he took up an appointment as commander of the Air Fighting Development Squadron. Promoted to the substantive rank of wing commander on 1 July 1952, he later went on an exchange with the United States Air Force, based at the Air Proving Ground at Eglin Air Force Base in Florida.

On his return to the United Kingdom, Berry took up a staff post at Fighter Command, as Wing Commander Plans. This was followed by a course at the Joint Services Staff College in 1954 after which, having also received courses on bomber operations, he took up a posting at Wittering as Wing Commander Flying on Vickers Valiant jet bombers. His appointment was at the behest of Air Chief Marshal Harry Broadhurst, who brought in former fighter pilots like Berry into senior posts at Bomber Command. He was subsequently given command of No. 543 Squadron, which he led until 1959. Promoted to group captain, he took up staff positions at the Air Ministry and then Bomber Command.

In the 1965 New Year Honours he was appointed Commander of the Order of the British Empire (CBE). At the end of January, he was part of the RAF cortège at the funeral procession for former prime minister Winston Churchill. Later in the year he returned to a command posting, of the RAF station at Lindholme. Promoted to air commodore at the start of 1966, his final years of military service was spent in charge of operations at the Board of Trade.

== Later life ==
Berry retired from the RAF on 29 January 1969 and settled in Hornsea, caring for his wife, who he had married in September 1940; she was suffering a terminal illness. He died in September 2000. In 2014, his medals which in addition to his CBE, DSO, DFC and Bar, also included the 1939–45 Star, Air Crew Europe Star, Africa Star, Defence Medal, War Medal and the Air Efficiency Award, were sold for £120,000. A plaque in his memory was laid at Kingston upon Hull's Guildhall, where he had worked prior to the Second World War, the following year.
