= No. 232 Operational Conversion Unit RAF =

No. 232 Operational Conversion Unit RAF
- Active: 1955-1965; 1970-1986
- Country: United Kingdom
- Branch: Royal Air Force
- Role: Bomber training
- Garrison/HQ: RAF Gaydon; RAF Marham

No. 232 Operational Conversion Unit was an Operational conversion unit of the Royal Air Force which existed between 1955 and 1986

== First formation ==
The unit was first formed at RAF Gaydon (now Jaguar Land Rover Gaydon Centre) on 21 February 1955 (shortly after Gaydon reopened following expansion) operating a number of aircraft including English Electric Canberra T.4s, Vickers Valiant B.1s and Handley Page Victor B.1 & B.2s (two of the three V bombers) and was disbanded still at Gaydon with the Victor element becoming the Tanker Training Flight.

History of the Tanker Training Flight

Formed at RAF Marham operating various marks of the Victor and a de Havilland Canada DHC-1 Chipmunk, being disbanded on 13 October 1969 becoming the Victor Training Unit.

== Second formation ==
232 OCU was reformed at RAF Marham on 6 February 1970 by merging the Victor (B.2) Training Flight and the Victor Training Unit and was disbanded on 4 April 1986 still at Marham.

History of the Victor (B.2) Training Flight

Formed at RAF Cottesmore (now Kendrew Barracks) on 1 April 1962, operating Victor B.2's, disbanded eight years later at RAF Wittering.

History of the Victor Training Unit

Formed at RAF Cottesmore during September 1961, operating B.2's, disbanded less than a year still at Cottesmore.
