= Hazel, West Virginia =

Hazel
- Unincorporated community
- Location within the state of West Virginia Hazel (the United States)
- Coordinates: 39°32′51″N 80°30′42″W
- Country: United States
- State: West Virginia
- County: Wetzel
- Elevation: 994 ft (303 m)
- Time zone: UTC-5 (Eastern (EST))
  - Summer (DST): UTC-4 (EDT)
- GNIS ID: 1554669

Hazel is an unincorporated community in Wetzel County, West Virginia, United States.
