= Taylor Hazell Architects =

Canadian architectural firm

Taylor Hazell Architects Limited is an architectural firm located in Toronto, Ontario.

== History ==
The firm was established in 1991 by architects Jill Taylor and Charles Hazell. The principals sought to create a firm that focused on the values of restoration and conservation in Toronto, and throughout Ontario as a whole, at a time when the recession encouraged adaptive reuse as a strategy for avoiding expensive demolition and reconstruction.

== Selected projects ==
- 1992: Dundurn Castle and Conference Centre, Hamilton, Ontario
- 1992: Bruce County Museum, Southampton, Ontario
- 1992–2010: Humber College Institute of Technology & Advanced Learning, Toronto, Ontario
- 1992-1993: Whitehern Historic House and Garden, Hamilton, Ontario
- 1994: Paisley Fire Hall and Hose Tower Restoration, Paisley, Ontario
- 1994–2013: R.C. Harris Water Treatment Plant, Toronto
- 1995–2005: Osgoode Hall Courthouse and Library, Toronto, Ontario
- 1996: McConaghy Seniors' Centre, Richmond Hill, Ontario
- 1997–2011: Casa Loma, Toronto, Ontario
- 1997–2009: St. Paul's Basilica, Toronto, Ontario
- 2000–2010: Union Station, Toronto, Ontario
- 2002-current: Canstage Theatre, Toronto, Ontario
- 2005: Humber College Institute of Technology & Advanced Learning Library, Toronto, Ontario
- 2005–2006: Brantford Superior Courthouse, Brantford, Ontario
- 2005–2007: Humber Arboretum Centre for Urban Ecology, Toronto, Ontario
- 2005–2009: Toronto Courthouse, Toronto, Ontario
- 2005–2011: Legislative Assembly of Ontario, Toronto, Ontario
- 2007–2009: Lebovic Centre for Arts & Entertainment, Whitchurch-Stouffville, Ontario
- 2009: Brockville Psychiatric Hospital, Brockville, Ontario
- 2008–2010: Elgin & Winter Garden Theatre], Toronto, Ontario
- 2009–2012: Alderlea Heritage Estate, Brampton, Ontario
- 2010–2011: Point Abino Light Tower, Fort Erie, Ontario

== Awards ==
=== Canadian Association of Heritage Professionals Awards ===
- 2013: Award of Excellence in Conservation for R.C. Harris Water Treatment Plant
- 2012: Award for Preservation of Heritage Building or Complex for Point Abino Lighthouse
- 2012: Award of Merit for Craftsmanship for Elgin and Winter Garden Theatre
- 2011: Award of Merit for Adaptive Reuse Project for Lebovic Centre for Arts and Entertainment
- 2010: Heritage Communication Award for "Building on History" Architectural Exhibit at the Harbourfront Centre, Toronto
- 2009: Award of Merit for Adaptive Reuse Project for Humber College Institute of Technology and Advanced Learning, Toronto
- 2009: Award of Merit for Preservation of Heritage Building or Complex for Casa Loma Roman Stone & Scottish Tower Conservation and Restoration

=== Ontario Architect's Association Awards ===
- 2010: Award of Excellence for the Humber Arboretum Centre for Urban Ecology
- 2010: Michael and Wanda Plachta Award for the Humber Arboretum Centre for Urban Ecology (Honoring architectural excellence for projects in Ontario that cost less than $8 million)

=== Heritage Toronto Awards ===
- 2012: Award of Excellence for Elgin and Winter Garden Theatre Exterior Restoration
- 2012: Award of Excellence for Berkeley Street Theatre (CanStage)
- 2009: Award of Excellence for Casa Loma Roman Stone & Scottish Tower Conservation and Restoration
- 2002: Award of Merit for Casa Loma Stable Tower
- 2002: Certificate of Commendation for Humber College Carriage House Restoration
- 1997: Award of Merit for Osgoode Hall

=== Design Exchange Awards ===
- 2009: Bronze Medal for "Architecture - Commercial" for the Humber Centre for Urban Ecology
- 2004: Silver Medal for Urban Design for Humber College Institute of Technology and Advanced Learning

=== Toronto Historical Board Awards ===
- 2003: Award of Merit for Humber College Institute of Technology and Advanced Learning
- 2002: Award of Merit for Casa Loma
- 1997: Award of Merit for Osgoode Hall

=== Toronto Construction Association Awards ===
- 1999: "Best of the Best" Award for Osgoode Hall Conservation Project
- 1998: "Best of the Best" Award for Osgoode Hall Conservation Project

=== Building Owner's and Management Association Certificates ===
- 2010: Certificate of Achievement
- 2009: Certificate of Building Excellence

=== Other awards ===
- 2014: Ontario Masonry Design Award - Provincial Award for Restoration Design for R.C. Harris Water Treatment Plant
- 2014: Brampton Urban Design Awards - Award of Excellence in Heritage Restoration for the Alderlea Heritage Estate
- 2006: Brantford Heritage Committee Heritage Recognition Award for the Brantford Courthouse
