= Edmund Hazle =

- Hazle photographed in 1945
- Born: Edmund Bryant Hazle; 26 November 1918; Hadleigh, Essex, England
- Died: 22 June 2006 (aged 87)
- Military career
- Allegiance: British
- Branch: Army
- Service years: 1939–45
- Rank: Lance corporal
- Nickname: Nutty
- Service number: 6016667
- Unit: Essex Regiment
- Awards: DCM and bar

Edmund Bryant "Nutty" Hazle DCM & Bar (26 November 1918 – 22 June 2006) was a British soldier during the Second World War and was one of only five men awarded the Distinguished Conduct Medal (DCM) and bar during the conflict.

== Early life ==
Hazle was born in Hadleigh, Essex shortly after the end of the First World War and after leaving school gained employment in the printing trade. Prior to the outbreak of the Second World War Hazle joined the Territorial Army and was a member of the 4th Battalion, the Essex Regiment where he served in the battalion band.

== Second World War ==
In September 1939 at the outbreak of war, the Territorial Army units were all mobilized and the 1/4th battalion (Note: In early 1939 all Territorial Army units were duplicated allowing for a doubling in size of the force. The Essex Regiment decided to title the two new battalions formed 1/4th and 2/4th.) formed part of 161st Infantry Brigade.

The battalion served in West Africa, North Africa and Cyprus before being transferred to 5th Indian Infantry Brigade within 4th Indian Infantry Division and by Summer 1942 the battalion was involved in the North African Campaign. Hazle's role within the battalion was as one of the stretcher bearers and it was in this role that he won his first award of the DCM. During the First Battle of El Alamein Hazle went, on many occasions, either into forward positions or into no-mans land to treat and recover wounded men. On 23 July on four occasions he treated and recovered wounded men from a position overlooked by enemy snipers; on the fourth occasion, Hazle was shot and severely wounded. Hazle's Commanding Officer, Lt Col Arthur Noble, submitted a recommendation for an immediate award of the DCM which was approved by Lt-Gen Montgomery (General officer commanding, 8th Army) and General Alexander (Commander-in-Chief Middle East Forces) in August 1942; notice of the award was published in the London Gazette on 24 September 1942. The citation read:

At El Alamein on the 23rd July 1942 after an attack by 161 Bde. Pte. Hazle went forward to attend a wounded Indian soldier, lying a few hundred yards from, and in full view of a snipers' post. In so doing Pte. Hazle was shot in the face and shoulder. This was the fourth man he had hurried to attend to in this position. He knew full well the dangers of going forward but never hesitated, and his courage was an inspiration to all. Over a period of weeks this Stretcher Bearer has shown devotion to duty of the very highest order. On numerous occasions he has dressed the wounds of, and carried men from forward positions under heavy shell fire. At no time has he allowed the heaviest enemy fire to interfere with the immediate execution of his duty, always with complete disregard for his own personal safety.

— Lt-Col A Noble, Recommendation for award (Report). WO 373/21/150. 10 August 1942 – via The National Archives.

Hazle's injuries kept him out of front line service for 18 months but had rejoined the battalion by March 1944, by this time serving in Italy. The battalion was heavily engaged in the Second Battle of Monte Cassino around an area known as Hangman's Hill. Hazle, by now appointed a Lance corporal was one of a two company party sent to support 1/9th Gurkha Rifles. The attack by the Gurkhas and the Essex battalion faltered and for six days Hazle and another Essex stretcher bearer, Lance corporal Leonard Piper formed the only medical support available to the isolated men. With scant resources Hazle treated wounds and even performed an amputation before the troops were evacuated. The commanding officer of the Gurkhas, Lt Col G Nangle (Note: Lt Col Nangle was awarded the Distinguished Service Order for his own part in the same action.) wrote a recommendation for a bar to the DCM for Hazle in April 1944 which was approved by Lt-Gen Freybeg (General officer commanding New Zealand Corps) and, again, Lt-Gen Alexander (Commander-in-Chief Allied Central Mediterranean Force) in June 1944. The award was published in the London Gazette on 3 August 1944. Lt Col Nangle wrote in the citation:

This NCO displayed most conspicuous bravery, devotion and initiative during the fighting at CASSINO 19-24 Mar 44.
As stretcher bearers, he and another soldier (L/Cpl PIPER) were with a company of their battalion which joined up with 1/9 G.R. on Pt. 435 (HANGMAN'S HILL), on the morning of 19 Mar. At this time 1/9 G.R. had no medical personnel with it, and had a large number of wounded whom it had not been possible to evacuate owing to continued enemy opposition.
L/Cpl. HAZLE immediately took charge of the medical situation, and with the slender resources at his disposal (a first aid haversack) treated the wounded of both units.
In very difficult conditions, to which was added a shortage of food and water; and under constant artillery and mortar bombardment; this NCO worked devotedly and tirelessly for six days, and there is no doubt that the very large number of wounded which were successfully evacuated owe their lives to him.
He arranged the collection of wounded, often exposing himself fearlessly to do so; treated them, at one time even performing an amputation; and improvised covering out of parachutes from the air being dropped then being practised.
Though at one time himself overcome by fumes from smoke shells he refused to stop his devoted work, and continued attending alike to British, Indian and Gurkha wounded.
The magnificent service rendered by this NCO under the most grim and dangerous conditions; the medical skill he displayed; and his never faltering devotion, bravery and spirit have earned the universal admiration of the whole of the force which was isolated in this position.

— Lt Col G S Nangle, Recommendation for award (Report). WO 373/7/30. 20 April 1944 – via The National Archives.

After Cassino Hazle continued to serve through the Italian Campaign until the 4th Indian Infantry Division was moved to Greece in December 1944 where he took part in the Dekemvriana operations. After Greece Hazle returned to the UK where he was demobilised in 1945 and returned to the print industry.

== Death ==
Hazle died in 2006 and was survived by his wife, Cissie, whom he had married after leaving the army, and their three children.
