= Hedley Hazelden =

British test pilot (1915–2001)

Hedley George Hazelden
- Born: 7 June 1915
- Died: August 2001 (aged 86)
- Military career
- Allegiance: United Kingdom
- Branch: Royal Air Force
- Rank: Squadron Leader
- Nickname: Hazel
- Conflicts: World War II
- Awards: DFC; King's Commendation for Valuable Service in the Air; Queen's Commendation for Valuable Service in the Air

Squadron Leader Hedley George "Hazel" Hazelden DFC & Bar (7 June 1915 – August 2001) was a British test pilot.

== Royal Air Force career ==
Hazelden trained as a pilot in the Royal Air Force Volunteer Reserve before the outbreak of the Second World War. He joined the Royal Air Force in May 1939 and completed his flying training on Ansons at 12 Flying Training School located at RAF Redhill in Surrey. He joined No. 44 Squadron RAF with Bomber Command at RAF Waddington in September 1940, flying Handley Page Hampden twin-engine bombers.

In 1941, after surviving one tour of duty, Hazelden underwent operational conversion training for the Avro Manchester twin-engined bomber at RAF Finningley in Yorkshire. He joined No. 83 Squadron RAF at RAF Scampton in Lincolnshire. He remained with No. 83 Squadron during its conversion to the Avro Lancaster four-engined bomber.

In July 1942, after a tour of operations during which he was awarded the Distinguished Flying Cross, he became a flying instructor at RAF Bassingbourn, then RAF Wescott, and finally RAF Oakley. He was later chief flying instructor for the Vickers Wellington and he was a member of the inaugural class at the Empire Test Pilots' School at RAF Boscombe Down.

== Civilian test pilot career ==
Hazelden left the RAF in 1947 and he was appointed as the chief test pilot of Handley Page. Notably, he carried out the flight test development of the Hastings military transport, the Victor four-jet nuclear weapon carrying V bomber (and later tanker aircraft), and the Hermes and Dart Herald airliners.

His skill as a pilot enabled him to survive several in-flight failures of prototype aircraft, including that of the prototype Dart Herald, which he was able to crash-land after a catastrophic engine fire en route to the Farnborough Airshow on 28 August 1958. With his wife and seven other passengers on board, he belly-landed the airliner in a small field, getting over 80-foot-tall (24 m) trees, under some power lines, and avoiding a farm roller parked in the field. The aircraft was a total loss, but there were no deaths or serious injuries, as all on board escaped through a hole torn in the aircraft by a concealed tree stump.

A Victor suffered a landing gear failure and had to be belly-landed on the grass runway at RAF Scampton. More damage was caused by the recovery of the aircraft than by the crash. In all cases, Hazelden was able to report in meticulous detail the events leading up to the crash.

== Later career ==
When Handley Page went into voluntary liquidation in March 1970, Hazelden flew for small airlines for several years, and then retired to Lincolnshire. He became president of the Handley Page Association in 1978.

== Personal life ==
Hazelden was a pupil of the Judd School, Tonbridge, from 1926 to 1933. He married Esma May Jones in March 1942, with whom he had a daughter Valerie. After Esma's death, Hazelden married Jennifer Vallee (nee McEwan) in 1987.

== Honours and awards ==
- 9 May 1941 – Distinguished Flying Cross (DFC) – Pilot Officer Hedley George Hazelden (60323) Royal Air Force Volunteer Reserve, No. 44 Squadron.
- 22 September 1942 Bar to the Distinguished Flying Cross (DFC) – Acting Flight Lieutenant Hedley George Hazelden, D.F.C. (60323), Royal Air Force Volunteer Reserve, No. 82 Squadron.
- 12 June 1947 – King's Commendation for Valuable Service in the Air – Acting Squadron Leader H.G. Hazelden, D.F.C. (60323), R.A.F.V.R.
- 1 January 1959 – Queen's Commendation for Valuable Service in the Air – Squadron Leader Hedley George Hazelden, D.F.C., Chief Test Pilot, Handley Page, Ltd.

== See also ==
- Eric "Winkle" Brown
