= Nancy Hazel =

Nancy Hazel was a Research Fellow with the School of Social Work at the University of Kent. In 1974, Hazel was part of a working group from the Council of Europe that published a report on child placement. The following year, she developed what became known as the Kent Family Placement Project (KFPP), the forerunner of all modern foster care across the United Kingdom.

Hazel took her inspiration from a tour of Belgium and Sweden, both of which already had systems which are now commonplace in the UK. The project, initially controversial, became a success, and practices outlined by the KFPP were gradually adopted by all local authorities in the UK. Today, many of Hazel's innovations, such as voluntary family placement and empowerment of foster caregivers, are commonplace and form the basis for the contemporary approach to foster care.
