= Marlene Hazle =

American computer scientist (1934 – 2011)

- Born: May 8, 1934; Toledo, Ohio, U.S.
- Died: June 7, 2011 (aged 77)
- Employer(s): RAND Corp. and MITRE
- Known for: Computer science, aerospace

Marlene Hazle (May 8, 1934 – June 7, 2011) was an American known for her work in computer science throughout the 20th century. She worked at RAND Corporation and Mitre Corporation for development of the Semi-Automatic Ground Environment and AESOP respectively. Hazle eventually became a supervisor and trained military personnel on the SAGE operating system. Hazle continued making contributions to the fields of computer science and aerospace throughout the 20th century.

== Biography ==
Marlene Hazle was born in 1934 in Toledo, Ohio. Her mother was a teacher and her father was a mechanical engineer. Hazle graduated from DeVilbiss High School in Toledo, Ohio in 1952. Hazle then went on to attend Cornell University. Hazle was a part of the Delta Gamma sorority, Phi Beta Kappa, and became Chairman of Cornell's Mortar Board chapter. At Cornell, Hazle took a class on numerical analysis where her professor offered to show the students how to use a computer to complete their homework. Hazle, along with other students, accepted this offer and began learning about computers. In 1956, Hazle graduated from Cornell with a degree in government. After graduation, Hazle began work at RAND Corporation in Boston, Massachusetts. At the time RAND was preparing people to work at SAGE centers. SAGE was a US Military program during the Cold War that used computers to monitor US airspace for Soviet invasion. At the time of its construction SAGE's computer, the AN/FSQ-7, was the largest computer ever built. Hazle was trained at RAND on SAGE computers and eventually went on to teach the class on the operating system of SAGE computers. After her work on SAGE Hazle began working at MITRE. At MITRE Hazle designed and programmed the AESOP system. The AESOP was one of the world's first on-line computer systems. On-line computer systems were the first systems to have many of the features of modern computers such as windows, computer mice, and media links. Hazle is one of the first people documented using an on-line computer. Prior to the 1970s it was common place for programmers to be possessive over their work. While at MITRE Hazle rejected this idea, becoming one of the earliest proponents of collaboration among programmers. Collaboration would eventually mature into today's concept of open-source development. She was also the secretary of Reuse Library Interoperability Group. The Reuse Library Interoperability Group was a group dedicated to facilitating the reuse of computer code between companies and government agencies. Hazle died at the age of 77 on June 7, 2011, in Lexington, Massachusetts.

== Contributions ==
- Hazle is acknowledged for assisting the US Air Force in software design methodologies.
- Hazle contributed to IEEE in the 1980 National Aerospace and Electronics Conference.
- Hazle wrote about code review and operating systems in the Automated Requirements Development User Manual.
- Hazle is acknowledged for her work on the MIMSY Project and for assisting the author of The Application of Anna and Formal Methods as an Ada Program Design Language.
- Hazle is thanked for her early support of guidelines compilation in Guidelines for Designing User Interface Software.
- Hazle is a listed contributor to United States Air Force Program Office Guide to Ada.
- Hazle reviewed the document Ada Adoption Handbook: Compiler Evaluation and Selection.
- Hazle is acknowledged with special recognition for supporting Arizona State University in their work on Ada environments.
- Hazle is acknowledged for contributing to Ada Architectures with her expertise in DQL(Diana Query Language).
- Hazle contributed to the paper A Prototype Implementation of the Ada Binding to Posix.
