= Littleby Creek =

Stream in the American state of Missouri

Coordinates: 39.3308732°N 91.8029424°W

Littleby Creek is a stream in Audrain County in the U.S. state of Missouri. It is a tributary of the South Fork Salt River.

Littleby Creek has the name of Robert Littleby, an early settler.

== See also ==
- List of rivers of Missouri
