= RAF Gaydon =

Former RAF station in Warwickshire, England

RAF Gaydon
- Gaydon, Warwickshire in England
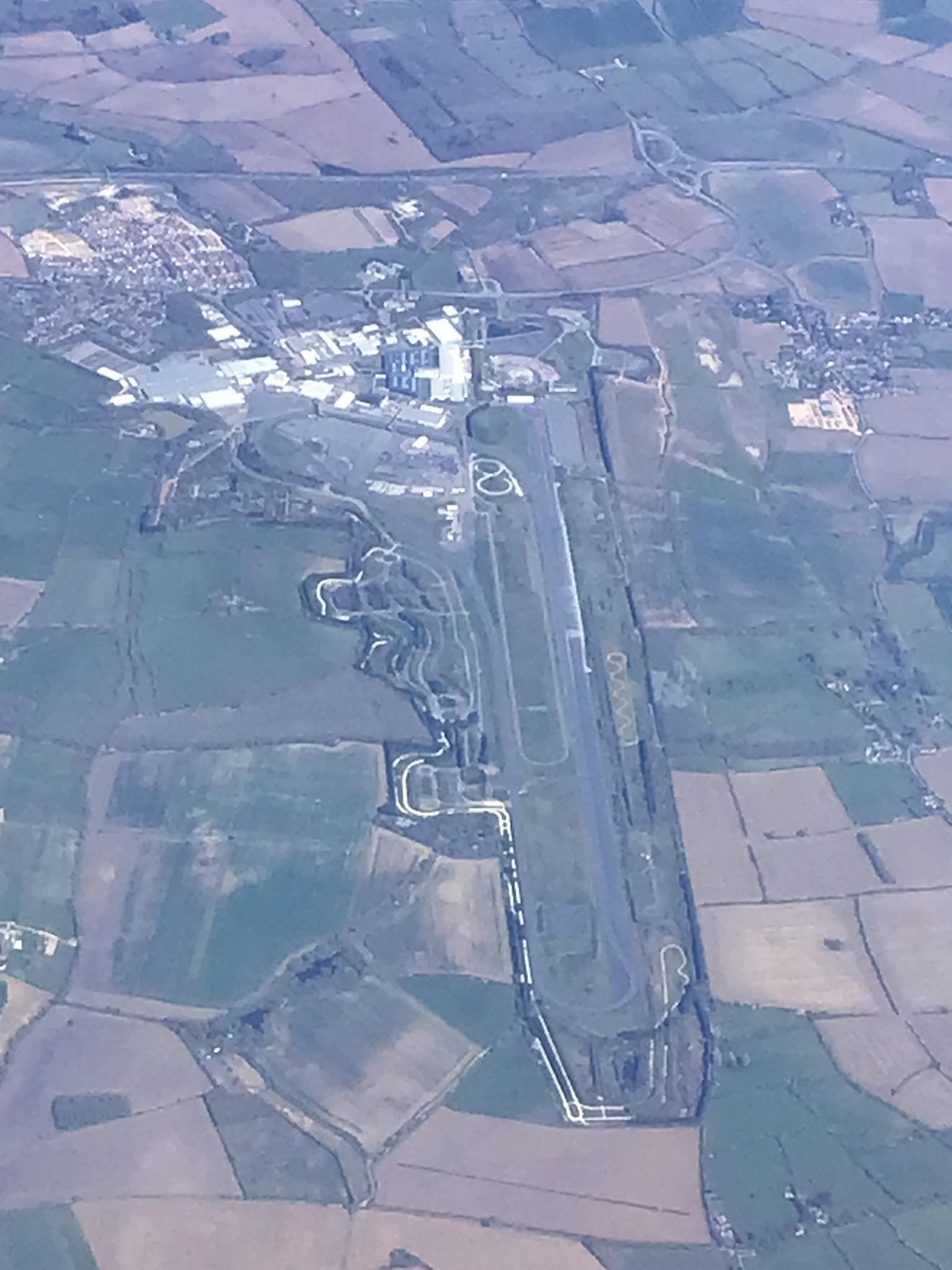
- Aerial view of RAF Gaydon (April, 2025)

Site information
- Type: Royal Air Force station
- Code: GP (-1954); GD (1954-)
- Owner: Ministry of Defence
- Operator: Royal Air Force
- Controlled by: RAF Strike Command; RAF Bomber Command * No. 91 (OTU) Group RAF; RAF Flying Training Command

Location
- Shown within Warwickshire RAF Gaydon (the United Kingdom)
- Coordinates: 52°11′08″N 001°29′31″W
- Grid reference: SP355555

Site history
- Built: 1941/42 & 1953/54
- Built by: John Laing & Son Ltd 1941/42 & 1953/54
- In use: 13 June 1942 - 31 October 1974
- Battles/wars: European theatre of World War II; Cold War

Airfield information
- Elevation: 12 metres (39 ft) AMSL
Runways
Direction	Length and surface
05/23 (Cold War)	2,750 metres (9,022 ft) Asphalt
05/23 (Wartime)	Asphalt
10/28 (Wartime)	Asphalt
16/34 (Wartime)	Asphalt

Royal Air Force Gaydon or more simply RAF Gaydon is a former Royal Air Force station located 5.2 miles (8.4 km) east of Wellesbourne, Warwickshire and 10.8 miles (17.4 km) north west of Banbury, Oxfordshire, England.

RAF Gaydon opened in 1942 and is known for its role during the Cold War, when it was under the control of RAF Bomber Command as it was the first Royal Air Force (RAF) station to receive the Vickers Valiant when No. 138 Squadron RAF re-formed here in 1955.

In 1978, the site passed into civilian ownership and today contains the British Motor Museum, the headquarters of automobile manufacturer Aston Martin, and the Jaguar Land Rover Gaydon Centre.

== History ==
=== Second World War ===
The airfield was used extensively during the Second World War, being opened in July 1942 and was immediately occupied by No. 12 Operational Training Unit (OTU) as a satellite of RAF Chipping Warden operating Vickers Wellingtons and Avro Ansons training pilots from a number of Allied nations, but mainly Canadian, Czech and New Zealanders. The OTU took newly qualified crew members and taught them how to fly on operations, including small courses about navigation. The airfield was also used by No. 22 OTU from July 1943 as a satellite from the main base of RAF Wellesbourne Mountford using Wellingtons and Ansons. No. 22 OTU while at Gaydon conducted bombing and air sea rescue operations helping to aid the allied war effort. A small unit the No. 312 Ferry Training Unit RAF (FTU) was deployed there training pilots to be employed in ferrying aircraft overseas.

Working on an airfield where the training of pilots was taking place was extremely dangerous because of the inexperience of the crews and the worn condition of their aircraft. The OTU Wellingtons were subject to hard use and this resulted in many accidents. The aircraft were often flown in harsh weather conditions both on UK training sorties and on operations over Northern Europe.

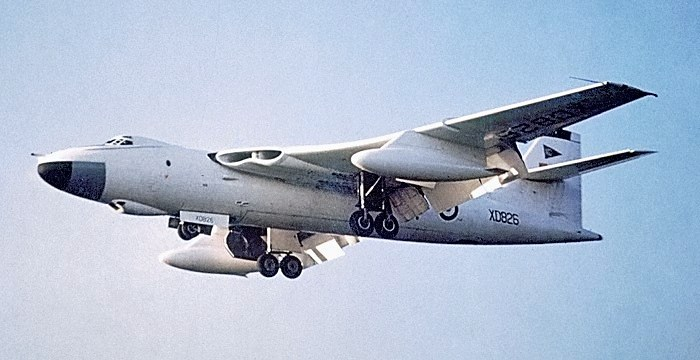
RAF Vickers Valiant in anti-flash white.

The airfield was based upon the standard Class A airfield for wartime operations with pan dispersals and concrete runways. The runway pattern was aligned with prevailing winds to assist take-offs and landings. The airfield originally had a standard bomber type control tower which was demolished sometime before 1955.

=== Postwar ===
Immediately after the war, training bomber crews ceased on 1 July 1945 with No. 3 Glider Training School RAF moving in shortly from RAF Exeter with General Aircraft Hotspurs, Tiger Moths, Airspeed Oxfords and Miles Master II's. The next unit to join was the Glider Instructors Flight RAF who moved from RAF Croughton on 28 May 1946 however their stay was short as Gaydon closed for flying on 15 August 1946. The station was then put on a care and maintenance basis thirteen days later on 28 August 1946.

=== V-bomber use ===
During 1953 the building of the new main runway (05-23) had begun with the associated buildings and dispersals being constructed. This included an Operational Readiness Platform and the Gaydon type hangar which was large enough to accommodate the new V-bombers which were coming into service. RAF Gaydon re-opened on 1 March 1954 before the first operational squadron (No. 138 Squadron RAF) arrived on 1 January 1955 which operated the nuclear capable Vickers Valiant B.1s. The squadron stayed at the station until 18 November 1955 when they moved to RAF Wittering.

The next unit to arrive was No. 232 Operational Conversion Unit RAF (OCU) which started operating during July 1957 with the Handley Page Victor B.1 and the English Electric Canberra T.4 with the first 7 Victors arriving on 11 November 1957. All Victor I crews trained at RAF Gaydon alongside the crews of the Valiants. However, in 1962 a similar unit was set up at Wittering called Victor B.2 Conversion Unit RAF which was a section of the OCU before the OCU at Gaydon disbanded on 30 June 1965 with the Victor element becoming the Tanker Training Flight RAF with the airfield being passed over to RAF Flying Training Command (FTC).

In 1968 RAF Flying Training Command formed No. 637 Gliding School RAF at RAF Gaydon for the purpose of Air Cadet glider training.

Under FTC the first unit to arrive was No. 2 Air Navigation School RAF (ANS) which flew the Vickers Varsity for nearly five years before moving to RAF Finningley during May 1970 after becoming part of No. 6 Flying Training School RAF on 24 April 1970.

In 1970 the airfield was transferred to HQ Central Flying School; the first unit being allocated to the airfield was the Strike Command Special Avionics Servicing Unit RAF of No. 1 Group RAF, until it was disbanded on 1 December 1971 when control of the airfield finally passed to No. 71 Maintenance Unit RAF at RAF Bicester before closing on 31 October 1974. No. 637 Gliding School remained at Gaydon until 1977, thereafter it reformed at RAF Little Rissington.

In 1974 the 43 Officer's Married Quarters (OMQ) were used by US Air Force personnel and families while the Airmen's Married Quarters (AMQ) were used by the local council. The OMQ were vacated in 1978 and demolished.

== Civilian use ==
In 1978 the airfield was bought by British Leyland, and with the subsequent development of vehicle test facilities, the site became home to what was then known as BL Technology. The main runway was converted into part of a four-lane test track, and many other tarmac and off-road tracks were created. The buildings that once housed service personnel were sold off and became the village of Lighthorne Heath.

Many of the original RAF buildings were demolished but a number were retained and are still in use to this day. Of particular note are the airfield control tower and the two main hangars, although only one of these retains its original appearance.

== See also ==
- List of former Royal Air Force stations
