= Grouse (disambiguation) =

Grouse are a group of birds from the order Galliformes.

Grouse may also refer to:

== Military ==
- USS Grouse, several US Navy ships
- 9K38 Igla, a Russian/Soviet surface-to-air missile, by NATO reporting name
- Operation Grouse (disambiguation), several military operations during the Second World War

== Places ==
- Grouse Mountain, Canada
- Grouse Mountain (California), U.S.
- Grouse Mountain, two mountains in Gallatin County, Montana, US; see List of mountains in Gallatin County, Montana
- Grouse Creek (British Columbia), a creek in Canada
- Grouse Creek (Humboldt County, California), a creek in Humboldt County, California, U.S.
- Grouse Creek (Placer County, California), a creek in Placer County, California, U.S.

== Other uses ==
- Toyama Grouses, a Japanese basketball team
- Grouse (podcast), a podcast hosted by Ashley Ahearn
- The Famous Grouse, a blend of Scotch whisky
