= Rowland White (British writer) =

British best-selling author (born 1970)

- Born: 18 June 1970 (age 56); Cambridge, England
- Education: University of Liverpool (BA, 1992)
- Occupations: Author, publisher
- Children: 3
- Writing career
- Period: 2006–present
- Genres: Aviation, military history

Rowland White (born 18 June 1970) is a British author. He writes about aviation.

== Life and education ==
White grew up in Cambridge, and began learning and writing about aviation as a child, before studying Modern History at the University of Liverpool. He graduated in 1992. He now lives in a village near Cambridge with his wife and three children.

== Career ==
White's first book, Vulcan 607 (about the first Operation Black Buck raid in the Falklands Conflict 1982), was published by Bantam Press in 2006. It was followed in 2009 by Phoenix Squadron and, in 2010 Storm Front, about the Dhofar War in Oman in the early seventies. All three were "The Sunday Times" top-ten bestsellers. These were followed by The Big Book of Flight, published by Bantam Press in 2013 and Into the Black (2016) about the first flight of the space shuttle in 1981.

White's writing has appeared in British national newspapers including "The Guardian", "The Daily Mail" and "The Sun", "Esquire" magazine, and in aviation magazines including "Aeroplane Monthly", "Fly Past" and "Aircraft Illustrated". A documentary based on the book Vulcan 607 called "The Falklands’ Most Daring Raid" was made by Darlow Smithson, and was first aired on Channel 4 in March 2012.

White has also worked as the publishing director at Michael Joseph Ltd publishers. He has published works by Tom Clancy, Clive Cussler, Andy McNab, Jeremy Clarkson, Ellen MacArthur, Roy Keane, Viv Richards and Brian Johnson, the lead singer from AC/DC. The titles he has published include: Tornado Down by John Nichol and John Peters, Sniper One, Sabre Squadron, Joint Force Harrier and Immediate Response, Major Mark Hammond’s account of his time flying Chinooks in Afghanistan.

== Works ==
- Vulcan 607 (Bantam Press, 2006) ISBN 978-0-593-05391-1
- Phoenix Squadron (Bantam Press, 2009) ISBN 978-0-593-05450-5
- Storm Front (Bantam Press, 2010) ISBN 978-0-593-06434-4
- The Big Book of Flight (Bantam Press, 2013) ISBN 978-0-593-07305-6
- Into the Black (Bantam Press, 2016) ISBN 978-0-593-06436-8
- Harrier 809 (Bantam Press, 2020) ISBN 978-1-787-63158-8
- Mosquito (Bantam Press, 2023) ISBN 978-1-787-63453-4
