= Aftermath of the Gulf War =

Period after the Gulf War

The aftermath of Gulf War saw drastic and profoundly significant political, cultural, and social change across the Middle East and even outside those that were directly involved.

== Palestinian community in Kuwait ==
Significant demographic changes occurred in Kuwait as a result of the Gulf War. There were 400,000 Palestinians in Kuwait before the Gulf War. During the Iraqi occupation of Kuwait, 200,000 Palestinians left Kuwait due to various reasons (fear or persecution, food shortages, medical care difficulties, financial shortages, fear of arrest and mistreatment at roadblocks by Iraqis). After the Gulf War of 1991, nearly 200,000 Palestinians fled Kuwait, partly due to economic burdens, regulations on residence and fear of abuse by Kuwaiti security forces.

Kuwait's lack of support for Palestinians after the Gulf War was a response to the alignment of Palestinian leader Yasser Arafat and the PLO with Saddam Hussein, who had earlier invaded Kuwait. On March 14, 1991, 200,000 Palestinians were still residing in Kuwait, out of initial 400,000. Palestinians began leaving Kuwait during one week in March 1991, following Kuwait's liberation from Iraqi occupation. During a single week in March, the Palestinian population of Kuwait had almost entirely fled the country. Kuwaitis said that Palestinians leaving the country could move to Jordan, since most Palestinians held Jordanian passports. According to The New York Times, Kuwaitis said the anger against Palestinians was such that there was little chance that those who had left during the seven-month occupation could ever return and relatively few of those remaining will be able to stay.

The Palestinians who fled Kuwait were mostly Jordanian citizens. Only in 2004, the political situation between Kuwaiti and Palestinian leadership improved with official apology of Mahmud Abbas on PLO support of the Iraqi invasion in 1991. In 2012, the official Palestinian embassy in Kuwait was re-opened. In 2012, 80,000 Palestinians lived in Kuwait.

== Gulf War syndrome ==
Many returning Coalition soldiers reported illnesses following their action in the war, a phenomenon known as Gulf War syndrome or Gulf War illness. Common symptoms that were reported are chronic fatigue, Fibromyalgia, and Gastrointestinal disorder. There has been widespread speculation and disagreement about the causes of the illness and the reported birth defects. Researchers found that infants born to male veterans of the 1991 war had higher rates of two types of heart valve defects. Gulf War veterans' children born after the war had a certain kidney defect that was not found in Gulf War veterans' children born before the war. Researchers have said that they did not have enough information to link birth defects with exposure to toxic substances. Some factors considered as possibilities include exposure to depleted uranium, chemical weapons, anthrax vaccines given to deploying soldiers, and/or infectious diseases. Major Michael Donnelly, a USAF officer during the War, helped publicize the syndrome and advocated for veterans' rights in this regard.

== Effects of depleted uranium ==
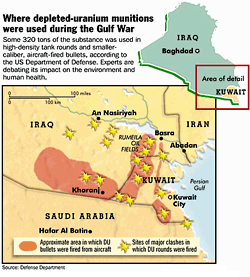
Approximate area and major clashes in which DU rounds were used.

Depleted uranium was used in the war in tank kinetic energy penetrators and 20–30 mm cannon ordnance. Significant controversy regarding the long term safety of depleted uranium exists, although detractors claim pyrophoric, genotoxic, and teratogenic heavy metal effects. Many have cited its use during the war as a contributing factor to a number of instances of health issues in the conflict's veterans and surrounding civilian populations. However, scientific opinion on the risk is mixed.

Some say that depleted uranium is not a significant health hazard unless it is taken into the body. External exposure to radiation from depleted uranium is generally not a major concern because the alpha particles emitted by its isotopes travel only a few centimeters in air or can be stopped by a sheet of paper. Also, the uranium-235 that remains in depleted uranium emits only a small amount of low-energy gamma radiation. However, if allowed to enter the body, depleted uranium, like natural uranium, has the potential for both chemical and radiological toxicity with the two important target organs being the kidneys and the lungs

== Highway of Death ==
On the night of 26–27 February 1991, some Iraqi forces began leaving Kuwait on the main highway north of Al Jahra in a column of some 1,400 vehicles. A patrolling E-8 Joint STARS aircraft observed the retreating forces and relayed the information to the DDM-8 air operations center in Riyadh, Saudi Arabia. These vehicles and the retreating soldiers were subsequently attacked, resulting in a 60 km stretch of highway strewn with debris—the Highway of Death. New York Times reporter Maureen Dowd wrote, "With the Iraqi leader facing military defeat, Mr. Bush decided that he would rather gamble on a violent and potentially unpopular ground war than risk the alternative: an imperfect settlement hammered out by the Soviets and Iraqis that world opinion might accept as tolerable."

Chuck Horner, Commander of U.S. and allied air operations has written:

[By February 26], the Iraqis totally lost heart and started to evacuate occupied Kuwait, but airpower halted the caravan of Iraqi Army and plunderers fleeing toward Basra. This event was later called by the media "The Highway of Death." There were certainly a lot of dead vehicles, but not so many dead Iraqis. They'd already learned to scamper off into the desert when our aircraft started to attack. Nevertheless, some people back home wrongly chose to believe we were cruelly and unusually punishing our already whipped foes.

...

By February 27, talk had turned toward terminating the hostilities. Kuwait was free. We were not interested in governing Iraq. So the question became "How do we stop the killing."

=== Bulldozer assault ===
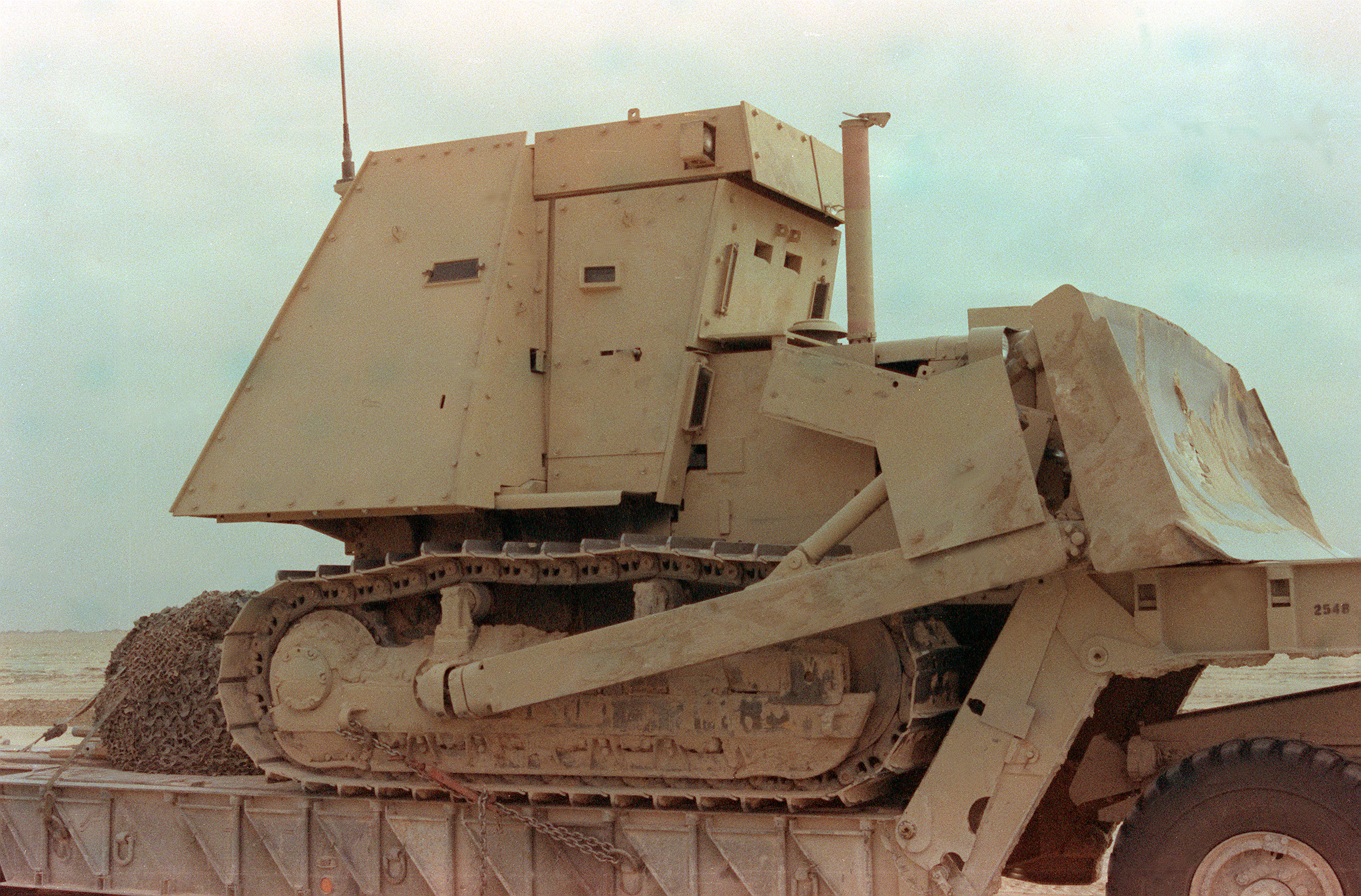
An armored bulldozer similar to the ones used in the attack.

Another incident during the war highlighted the question of large-scale Iraqi combat deaths. This was the "bulldozer assault", wherein two brigades from the U.S. 1st Infantry Division (Mechanized) were faced with a large and complex trench network, as part of the heavily fortified "Saddam Hussein Line". After some deliberation, they opted to use anti-mine plows mounted on tanks and combat earthmovers to simply plow over and bury alive the defending Iraqi soldiers. Not a single American was killed during the attack. Reporters were banned from witnessing the attack, near the neutral zone that touches the border between Saudi Arabia and Iraq. Every American in the assault was inside an armored vehicle. One newspaper story reported that U.S. commanders estimated thousands of Iraqi soldiers surrendered, escaping live burial during the two-day assault 24–26 February 1991. Patrick Day of Newsday reported, "Bradley Fighting Vehicles and Vulcan armored carriers straddled the trench lines and fired into the Iraqi soldiers as the tanks covered them with mounds of sand. 'I came through right after the lead company,' [Col. Anthony] Moreno said. 'What you saw was a bunch of buried trenches with peoples' arms and things sticking out of them... '" However, after the war, the Iraqi government said that only 44 bodies were found. In his book The Wars Against Saddam, John Simpson alleges that U.S. forces attempted to cover up the incident. After the incident, the commander of the 1st Brigade said: "I know burying people like that sounds pretty nasty, but it would be even nastier if we had to put our troops in the trenches and clean them out with bayonets." Secretary of Defense Dick Cheney did not mention the First Division's tactics in an interim report to Congress on Operation Desert Storm. In the report, Cheney acknowledged that 457 enemy soldiers were buried during the ground war.

== Coalition bombing of Iraq's civilian infrastructure ==
In the 23 June 1991 edition of The Washington Post, reporter Bart Gellman wrote: "Many of the targets were chosen only secondarily to contribute to the military defeat of [Iraq] ... Military planners hoped the bombing would amplify the economic and psychological impact of international sanctions on Iraqi society ... They deliberately did great harm to Iraq's ability to support itself as an industrial society ..." In the Jan/Feb 1995 edition of Foreign Affairs, French diplomat Eric Rouleau wrote: "[T]he Iraqi people, who were not consulted about the invasion, have paid the price for their government's madness ... Iraqis understood the legitimacy of a military action to drive their army from Kuwait, but they have had difficulty comprehending the Allied rationale for using air power to systematically destroy or cripple Iraqi infrastructure and industry: electric power stations (92 percent of installed capacity destroyed), refineries (80 percent of production capacity), petrochemical complexes, telecommunications centers (including 135 telephone networks), bridges (more than 100), roads, highways, railroads, hundreds of locomotives and boxcars full of goods, radio and television broadcasting stations, cement plants, and factories producing aluminum, textiles, electric cables, and medical supplies." However, the U.N. subsequently spent billions rebuilding hospitals, schools, and water purification facilities throughout the country.

== Abuse of Coalition POWs ==
During the conflict, Coalition aircrew shot down over Iraq were displayed as prisoners of war on TV, most with visible signs of abuse. Amongst several testimonies to poor treatment, Air Force Captain, Richard Storr was allegededly tortured by Iraqis during the Persian Gulf War. Iraqi secret police broke his nose, dislocated his shoulder and punctured his eardrum. Royal Air Force Tornado crew John Nichol and John Peters have both alleged that they were tortured during this time. Nichol and Peters were forced to make statements against the war in front of television cameras. Members of British Special Air Service Bravo Two Zero were captured while providing information about an Iraqi supply line of Scud missiles to Coalition forces. Only one, Chris Ryan, evaded capture while the group's other surviving members were violently tortured. Flight surgeon (later General) Rhonda Cornum was raped by one of her captors after the Black Hawk she was riding in was shot down while searching for a downed F-16 pilot.

=== Operation Southern Watch ===
Since the war, the U.S. has had a continued presence of 5,000 troops stationed in Saudi Arabia – a figure that rose to 10,000 during the 2003 conflict in Iraq. Operation Southern Watch enforced the no-fly zones over southern Iraq set up after 1991; oil exports through the Persian Gulf's shipping lanes were protected by the Bahrain-based U.S. Fifth Fleet.

Since Saudi Arabia houses Mecca and Medina, Islam's holiest sites, many Muslims were upset at the permanent military presence. The continued presence of U.S. troops in Saudi Arabia after the war was one of the stated motivations behind the 11 September terrorist attacks, the Khobar Towers bombing, and the date chosen for the 1998 U.S. embassy bombings (7 August), which was eight years to the day that U.S. troops were sent to Saudi Arabia. Osama bin Laden interpreted the Islamic prophet Muhammad as banning the "permanent presence of infidels in Arabia". In 1996, bin Laden issued a fatwa, calling for U.S. troops to leave Saudi Arabia. In a December 1999 interview with Rahimullah Yusufzai, bin Laden said he felt that Americans were "too near to Mecca" and considered this a provocation to the entire Islamic world.

== Sanctions ==
On 6 August 1990, after Iraq's invasion of Kuwait, the U.N. Security Council adopted Resolution 661 which imposed economic sanctions on Iraq, providing for a full trade embargo, excluding medical supplies, food and other items of humanitarian necessity, these to be determined by the Council's sanctions committee. From 1991 until 2003, the effects of government policy and sanctions regime led to hyperinflation, widespread poverty and malnutrition.

During the late 1990s, the U.N. considered relaxing the sanctions imposed because of the hardships suffered by ordinary Iraqis. Studies dispute the number of people who died in south and central Iraq during the years of the sanctions.

=== Draining of the Qurna Marshes ===
The draining of the Qurna Marshes was an irrigation project in Iraq during and immediately after the war, to drain a large area of marshes in the Tigris–Euphrates river system. Formerly covering an area of around 3,000 square kilometers, the large complex of wetlands were almost completely emptied of water, and the local Shi'ite population relocated, following the war and 1991 uprisings. By 2000, United Nations Environment Programme estimated that 90% of the marshlands had disappeared, causing desertification of over 7,500 square miles (19,000 km^{2}).

The draining of the Qurna Marshes also called The Draining of the Mesopotamian Marshes occurred in Iraq and to a smaller degree in Iran between the 1950s and 1990s to clear large areas of the marshes in the Tigris-Euphrates river system. Formerly covering an area of around 20,000 km^{2} (7,700 sq mi), the large complex of wetlands was 90% drained prior to the 2003 Invasion of Iraq. The marshes are typically divided into three main sub-marshes, the Hawizeh, Central, and Hammar Marshes and all three were drained at different times for different reasons. Initial draining of the Central Marshes was intended to reclaim land for agriculture but later all three marshes would become a tool of war and revenge.

Many international organizations such as the U.N. Human Rights Commission, the Islamic Supreme Council of Iraq, the Wetlands International, and Middle East Watch have described the project as a political attempt to force the Marsh Arabs out of the area through water diversion tactics.

== Oil spill ==
On 23 January, Iraq dumped 400 million US gallons (1,500,000 m^{3}) of crude oil into the Persian Gulf, causing the largest offshore oil spill in history at that time. It was reported as a deliberate natural resources attack to keep U.S. Marines from coming ashore (Missouri and Wisconsin had shelled Failaka Island during the war to reinforce the idea that there would be an amphibious assault attempt). About 30–40% of this came from allied raids on Iraqi coastal targets.

== Kuwaiti oil fires ==
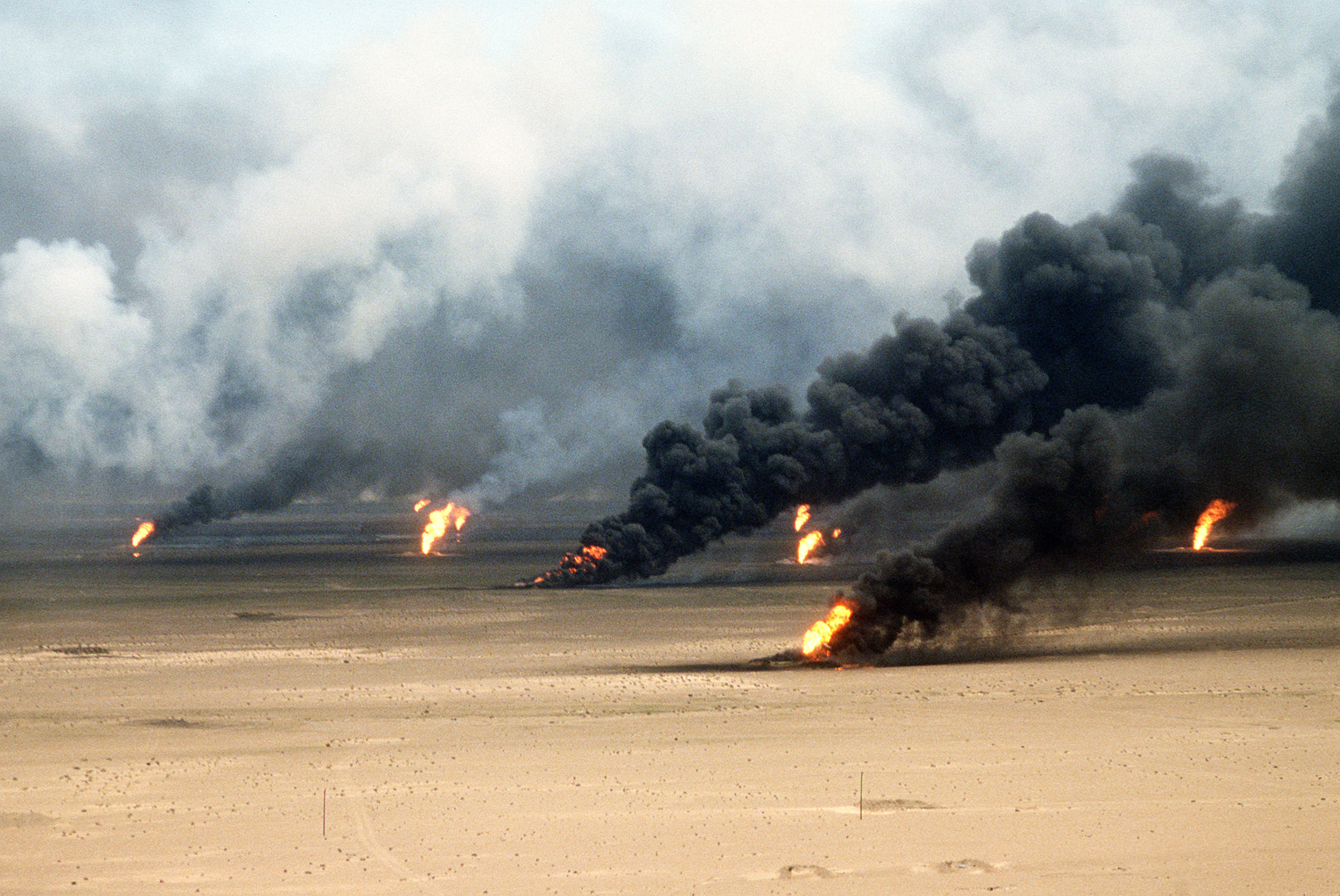
Oil well fires rage outside Kuwait City in 1991

The Kuwaiti oil fires were caused by the Iraqi military setting fire to 700 oil wells as part of a scorched earth policy while retreating from Kuwait in 1991 after conquering the country but being driven out by Coalition forces. The fires started in January and February 1991 and the last one was extinguished by November 1991.

The resulting fires burned out of control because of the dangers of sending in firefighting crews. Land mines had been placed in areas around the oil wells, and a military cleaning of the areas was necessary before the fires could be put out. Somewhere around 6 million barrels (950,000 m^{3}) of oil were lost each day. Eventually, privately contracted crews extinguished the fires, at a total cost of US$1.5 billion to Kuwait. By that time, however, the fires had burned for approximately ten months, causing widespread pollution.

=== Environmental impact ===
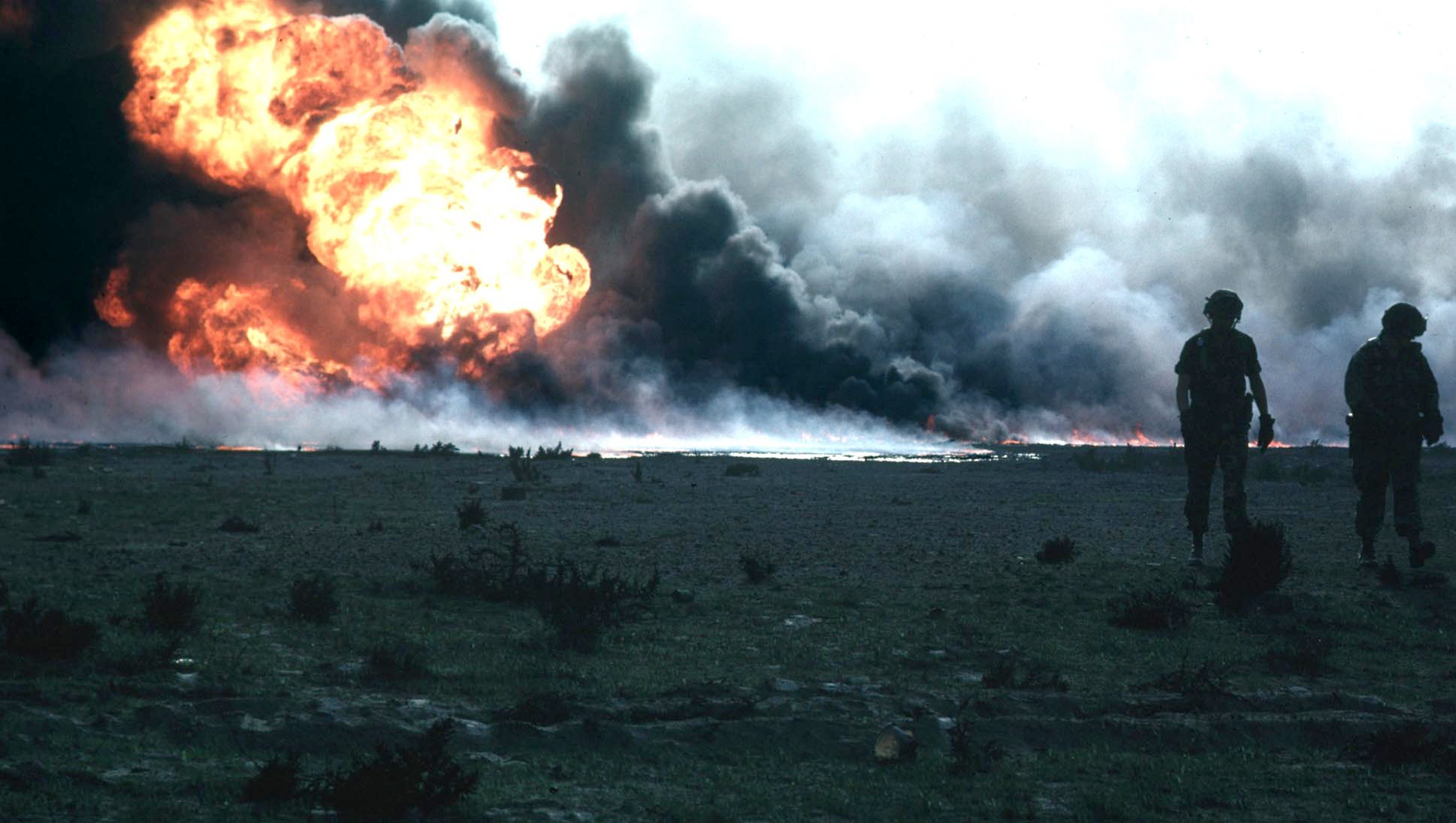
An oilfield on fire

Immediately following Iraq's invasion of Kuwait, predictions were made of an environmental disaster stemming from Iraqi threats to blow up captured Kuwaiti oil wells. Speculation ranging from a nuclear winter type scenario, to heavy acid rain and even short term immediate global warming were presented at the World Climate Conference in Geneva that November.

On 10 January 1991, a paper appearing in the Journal Nature, stated Paul Crutzen's calculations that the setting alight of the Kuwait oil wells would produce a "nuclear winter", with a cloud of smoke covering half of the Northern Hemisphere after 100 days had passed and beneath the cloud, temperatures would be reduced by 5-10 Celsius. This was followed by articles printed in the Wilmington morning star and the Baltimore Sun newspapers in mid to late January 1991, with the popular TV scientist personality of the time, Carl Sagan, who was also the co-author of the first few nuclear winter papers along with Richard P. Turco, John W. Birks, Alan Robock and Paul Crutzen together collectively stated that they expected catastrophic nuclear winter like effects with continental sized impacts of "sub-freezing" temperatures as a result of if the Iraqis went through with their threats of igniting 300 to 500 pressurized oil wells and they burned for a few months.

Later when Operation Desert Storm had begun, Dr. S. Fred Singer and Carl Sagan discussed the possible environmental impacts of the Kuwaiti petroleum fires on the ABC News program Nightline. Sagan again argued that some of the effects of the smoke could be similar to the effects of a nuclear winter, with smoke lofting into the stratosphere, a region of the atmosphere beginning around 43,000 feet (13,000 m) above sea level at Kuwait, resulting in global effects and that he believed the net effects would be very similar to the explosion of the Indonesian volcano Tambora in 1815, which resulted in the year 1816 being known as the Year Without a Summer.

He reported on initial modeling estimates that forecast impacts extending to south Asia, and perhaps to the northern hemisphere as well. Singer, on the other hand, said that calculations showed that the smoke would go to an altitude of about 3,000 feet (910 m) and then be rained out after about three to five days and thus the lifetime of the smoke would be limited. Both height estimates made by Singer and Sagan turned out to be wrong, albeit with Singer's narrative being closer to what transpired, with the comparatively minimal atmospheric effects remaining limited to the Persian Gulf region, with smoke plumes, in general, lofting to about 10,000 feet (3,000 m) and a few times as high as 20,000 feet (6,100 m).

Along with Singer's televised critique, Richard D. Small criticized the initial Nature paper in a reply on 7 March 1991 arguing along similar lines as Singer.

Sagan later conceded in his book The Demon-Haunted World that his prediction did not turn out to be correct: "it was pitch black at noon and temperatures dropped 4–6 °C over the Persian Gulf, but not much smoke reached stratospheric altitudes and Asia was spared."

At the peak of the fires, the smoke absorbed 75 to 80% of the sun's radiation. The particles rose to a maximum of 20,000 feet (6,100 m), but were scavenged by cloud condensation nuclei from the atmosphere relatively quickly.

Sagan and his colleagues expected that a "self-lofting" of the sooty smoke would occur when it absorbed the sun's heat radiation, with little to no scavenging occurring, whereby the black particles of soot would be heated by the sun and lifted/lofted higher and higher into the air, thereby injecting the soot into the stratosphere where it would take years for the sun blocking effect of this aerosol of soot to fall out of the air, and with that, catastrophic ground level cooling and agricultural impacts in Asia and possibly the Northern Hemisphere as a whole.

In retrospect, it is now known that smoke from the Kuwait oil fires only affected the weather pattern throughout the Persian Gulf and surrounding region during the periods that the fires were burning in 1991, with lower atmospheric winds blowing the smoke along the eastern half of the Arabian Peninsula, and cities such as Dhahran and Riyadh, and countries such as Bahrain experienced days with smoke filled skies and carbon soot rainout/fallout.

Thus the immediate consequence of the arson sabotage was a dramatic regional decrease in air quality, causing respiratory problems for many Kuwaitis and those in neighboring countries.

According to the 1992 study from Peter Hobbs and Lawrence Radke daily emissions of sulfur dioxide (which can generate acid rain) were 57% of that from electric utilities in the United States, emissions of carbon dioxide were 2% of global emissions and emissions of soot were 3400 metric tons per day.

In a paper in the DTIC archive, published in 2000, it states that "Calculations based on smoke from Kuwaiti oil fires in May and June of 1991 indicate that combustion efficiency was about 96% in producing carbon dioxide. While, with respect to the incomplete combustion fraction, Smoke particulate matter accounted for 2% of the fuel burned, of which 0.4% was soot."[With the remaining 2%, being oil that did not undergo any initial combustion].

Peter V. Hobbs also narrated a short amateur documentary titled Kuwait Oil Fires that followed the University of Washington/UW's "Cloud and Aerosol Research Group" as they flew through, around and above the smoke clouds and took samples, measurements, and video of the smoke clouds in their Convair C-131(N327UW) Aerial laboratory.

== See also ==
- Iraq War (2003–2011)
- War on terror
- War in Afghanistan (2001–2021)
- United Nations Iraq-Kuwait Observation Mission (April 1991 – October 2003)
- Kuwait–Iraq barrier
