= Grouse Mountain (disambiguation) =

Grouse Mountain is a mountain in North Vancouver, British Columbia, Canada.

Grouse Mountain may also refer to:

- Grouse Mountain (California), US
- Grouse Mountain, two mountains in Gallatin County, Montana; see List of mountains in Gallatin County, Montana
- Grouse Mountain (New Mexico), US
