= No. 15 Squadron RAF =

Dormant flying squadron of the Royal Air Force

No. XV Squadron RAF
- Squadron badge
- Active: 1915–1918 (RFC); 1918–1919; 1924–1957; 1958–1964; 1970–1983; 1983–1991; 1992–2017
- Disbanded: 31 March 2017
- Country: United Kingdom
- Branch: Royal Air Force
- Type: Flying squadron
- Motto: Aim Sure
- Aircraft tail codes: EF (Nov 1938 – Sep 1939); LS (Sep 1939 – Apr 1951); DJ (1943); EA–EZ (Sep 1983 – Dec 1991); D (Tornados); TA–TZ and TAA–TAZ (Apr 1992 – 2006)

Number 15 Squadron, also known as No. XV Squadron, is a dormant squadron of the Royal Air Force. It most recently operated the Panavia Tornado GR4 from RAF Lossiemouth as No. 15 (Reserve) Squadron. It was the RAF's Operational Conversion Unit for the Tornado GR4 which taught pilots and Weapon Systems Officers (WSO) how to fly the aircraft and what tactics to use to best exploit the performance of their aircraft and its weapons. The squadron disbanded on 31 March 2017.

== History ==
=== First World War (1915–1918) ===
No. 15 Squadron was first formed at Farnborough Airfield on 1 March 1915 as a Royal Flying Corps training unit, commanded by Major Philip Joubert de la Ferté. It was mainly equipped with the Royal Aircraft Factory B.E.2c, supplemented with a few Bristol Scouts. It moved to France on 22 December 1915, undertaking a reconnaissance role in support of the army. It operated in support of IV Corps during the Battle of the Somme in the summer of 1916, suffering heavy losses from both ground fire and German fighter aircraft. The squadron was praised by Douglas Haig for its work in support of the Fifth Army in the Ancre salient in January 1917.

It was again heavily committed to action in support of the offensive at Arras in spring 1917. It re-equipped with the Royal Aircraft Factory R.E.8 in June 1917, retaining the "Harry Tate" (a rhyming-slang term for the aircraft) until the end of the First World War. The squadron was based at La Gorgue in northern France from 7 July until 18 August 1917.

For the great tank attack at the Battle of Cambrai (November–December 1917), No.15 Squadron was specially tasked with checking the camouflaging of the troops, guns and dumps assembled before the attack.

=== Interwar period (1919–1938) ===
The squadron moved back to the United Kingdom in February 1919, and was disbanded at Fowlmere on 31 December that year.

It reformed on 20 March 1924 at RAF Martlesham Heath in Suffolk as part of the Aeroplane and Armament Experimental Establishment, mainly carrying out test flying of bomber aircraft. No. 15 Squadron was again reformed in 1934 at RAF Abingdon in Oxfordshire as a light-bomber squadron equipped with the Hawker Hart. Its commanding officer of the day, Squadron Leader Thomas Elmhirst, instigated the squadron's tradition of writing its squadron number in Roman numerals. It received Hawker Hinds as a temporary replacement for the Harts, before re-equipping with Fairey Battle monoplanes in 1938.

=== Second World War (1939–1945) ===
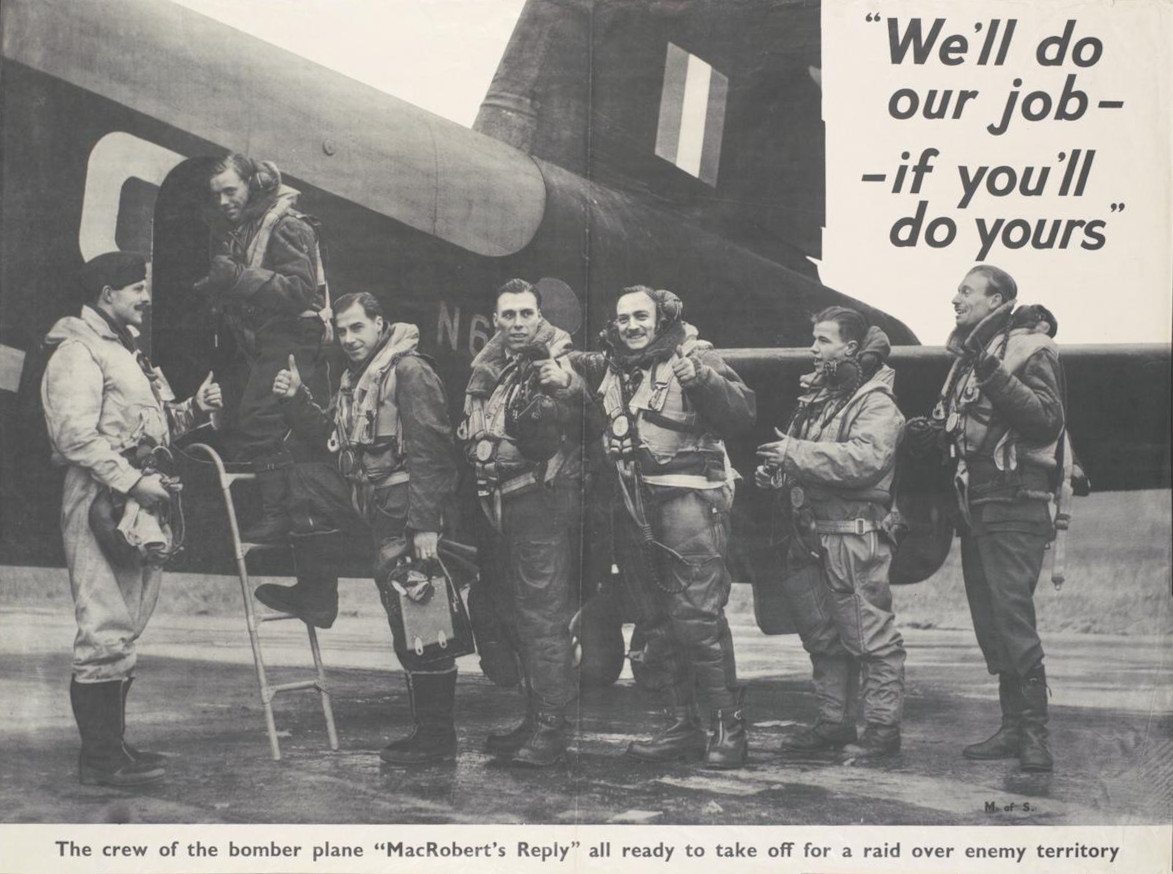
Short Stirling N6086 MacRobert's Reply c. 1941–1942

Still equipped with Fairey Battle light-bomber, the squadron flew to France in September 1939 as part of No. 71 Wing, Advanced Air Striking Force. It departed from RAF Abingdon around 2 September. After returning to the UK, the following year it re-equipped first with the Bristol Blenheim and again with the Vickers Wellington before becoming one of the first Short Stirling bomber squadrons.

In 1943, the squadron converted to the Avro Lancaster and was based at RAF Mildenhall in Suffolk. In mid-1945 the squadron was involved in Operation Manna dropping food to Dutch civilians and later in repatriation flights for returning allied prisoners of war.

=== Early Cold War (1946–1960s) ===
In 1947, the Lancasters were replaced with the Avro Lincoln, before the squadron adopted the nuclear-strike role in 1951 with the Boeing Washington.

No. 15 Squadron re-equipped with the English Electric Canberra B.2 bomber in June 1953, whilst at RAF Coningsby, Lincolnshire, later moving to RAF Cottesmore, Rutland and then to RAF Honington, Suffolk. The Canberra was used in combat in the Suez Crisis and dropped the most bombs in the eighteen days of conflict. The squadron disbanded on 15 April 1957.

On 1 September 1958, it was reformed as the second Handley Page Victor squadron, stationed at RAF Cottesmore. In 1962, it was one of the many squadrons ready for action during the Cuban Missile Crisis. Deploying to RAF Tengah, Singapore in 1963, it was on hand as a show of force to deter Indonesia during the Indonesia-Malaysia Confrontation.

The squadron was disbanded on 31 October 1964 upon withdrawal from overseas detachment. It was then intended to be reformed with the BAC TSR-2 and then the General Dynamics F-111K, but with both acquisitions cancelled, these plans were not carried out.

=== Nuclear force (1970s and 1980s) ===
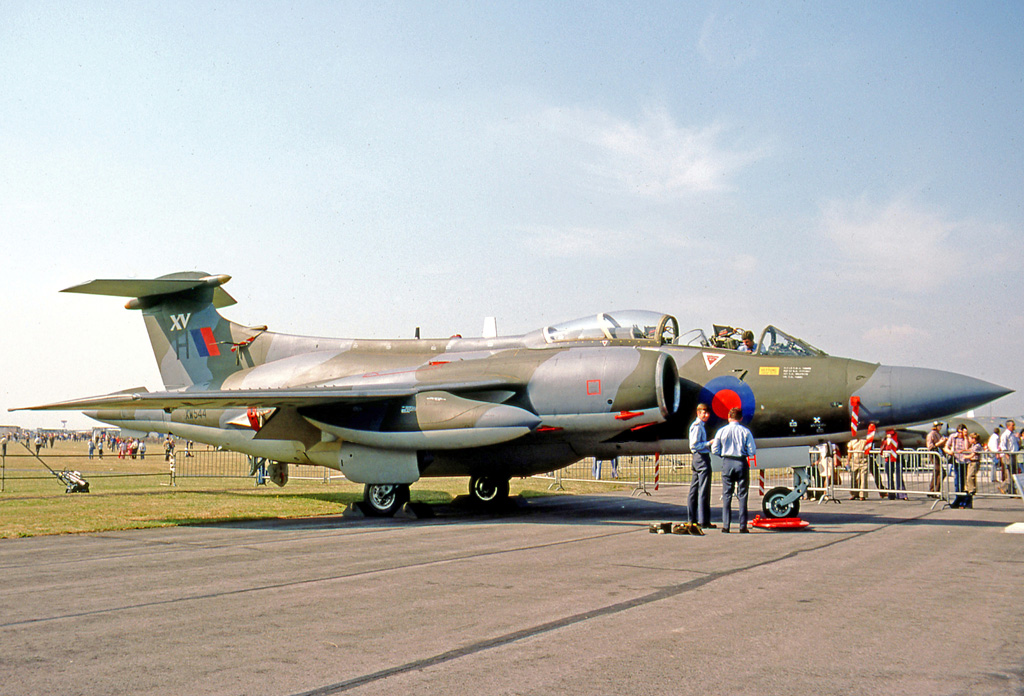
Blackburn Buccaneer S2B of No. 15 Squadron in 1977

In 1970, the squadron reformed with the Blackburn Buccaneer S.2B at RAF Honington, shortly afterwards moving to RAF Laarbruch in Germany. From 1971, the squadron's task at Laarbruch, assigned to NATO's Supreme Allied Commander Europe (SACEUR), was the support of the army in a European land battle, first in a conventional role, and later in a tactical nuclear delivery role, if required. RAF planning staff expected the squadron's twelve Buccaneers to suffer attrition of one third their strength, leaving sufficient survivors, with those held back in reserve from the conventional phase, to deliver the squadron's allocation of eighteen WE.177 nuclear bombs.

In 1983, the squadron exchanged their twelve Buccaneers for twelve Panavia Tornado GR1, for use in a similar role from early 1984. Because of the UK's commitment to SACEUR, this involved the use of the "Designate" process whereby a Tornado squadron was formed and worked up at Honington and once operational moved to Laarbruch and assumed the No.15 Squadron identity from the Buccaneer unit. This made the squadron the first Tornado unit in Germany – a force that would grow to eight squadrons – and remained in the nuclear delivery role for SACEUR with an increased allocation of eighteen weapons owing to the Tornado's ability to carry two bombs. The squadron's nuclear delivery role assigned to SACEUR continued at this strength until 1991, when it disbanded.

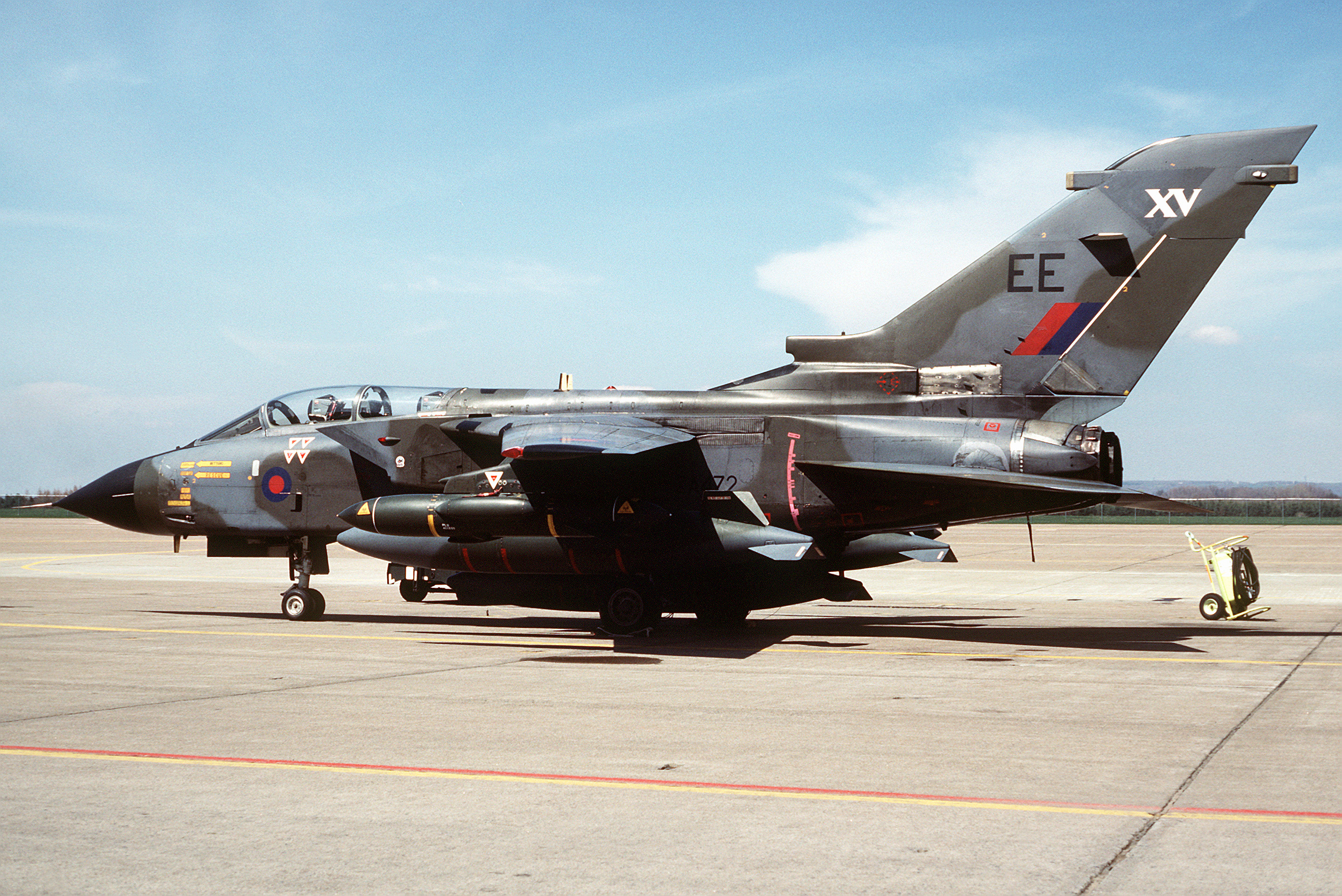
A No. 15 Squadron Panavia Tornado GR1 in 1987

=== Desert Storm onwards (1990s) ===
Deployed to Bahrain during the build-up to Operation Desert Storm, the squadron was given the specific brief to knock out Iraqi Air Force bases by bombing the runways. On its second mission, an ultra-low-level daylight mission against Ar Rumaylah airfield with Squadron Leader Pablo Mason leading a flight of four Tornados, his number two crew of John Peters and navigator John Nichol were shot down and became prisoners of war. Mason (along with many other RAF Tornado crews) flew a total of 24 bombing missions in Desert Storm, from ultra-low-level daylight, medium-level night bombing. The first-ever Buccaneer and Tornado attack using laser-guided bombs took place on 2 February 1991. On 14 February, another aircraft crewed by No. 15 Squadron personnel was shot down, resulting in the loss of Flight Lieutenant Stephen Hicks and the capture of Flight Lieutenant Rupert Clark.

In 1992, No.45 (Reserve) Squadron, the Tornado Weapons Conversion Unit based at RAF Honington changed its "shadow" identity to No.15 (Reserve) Squadron, remaining at RAF Honington until 1993 assigned to SACEUR in the role it had performed when based at RAF Laarbruch. The squadron's equipment of twenty-six aircraft and thirty-nine WE.177 nuclear bombs was unusually large. Relocation to RAF Lossiemouth in 1994 brought reassignment to NATO's Supreme Allied Commander Atlantic in the maritime strike role, armed with a variety of conventional weapons and eighteen WE.177 nuclear bombs. After the closure of the RAF Cottesmore-based Tri-National Tornado Training Establishment (TTTE) in 1999, No. 15(R) Squadron assumed responsibility for both conversion to the Tornado and weapons training.

=== 21st century (2000–2017) ===
The squadron disbanded on 31 March 2017 in preparation for the retirement of the Tornado GR4 in 2019. The squadron aircraft and crews were absorbed into front-line squadrons at RAF Marham who carried out refresher training when required. The squadron completed its final operational flying on 17 March 2017.

== Aircraft operated ==
List of aircraft operated by No. 15 Squadron.

- Royal Aircraft Factory B.E.2c (1915–1917)
- Bristol Scout (1916)
- Royal Aircraft Factory B.E.2d/e (1916–1917)
- Royal Aircraft Factory R.E.8 (1917–1919)
- Airco DH.9A (1924–1926)
- Hawker Horsley (1926–1934)
- Various types for testing (1924–1934)
- Hawker Hart (1934–1936)
- Hawker Hind (1936–1938)
- Fairey Battle (June 1938 – December 1939)
- Bristol Blenheim Mk IV (December 1939 – November 1940)
- Vickers Wellington Mk IC (November 1940 – May 1941)
- Short Stirling Mk I/ Mk III (April 1941 – December 1943)
- Avro Lancaster B.I/B.I(Special)/B.III (December 1943 – 1947)
- Avro Lincoln (1947–1950)
- Boeing Washington B.1 (1951–1953)
- English Electric Canberra B.2 (1953–1957)
- Handley Page Victor B.1 (1958–1964)
- Blackburn Buccaneer S.2B (1970–1983)
- Panavia Tornado GR1 (1983–2002)
- Panavia Tornado GR4 (2001–2017)

== Heritage ==
=== Badge and motto ===
The squadron's heraldic badge features a hind's head affrontee erased at the neck between wings elevated and conjoined in base. The badge was a version of a hart emblem used previously, altered to reflect that the squadron operated the Hawker Hind when the badge was authorised by King Edward VIII in May 1936.

The squadron's motto is Aim Sure.

=== MacRobert's Reply ===
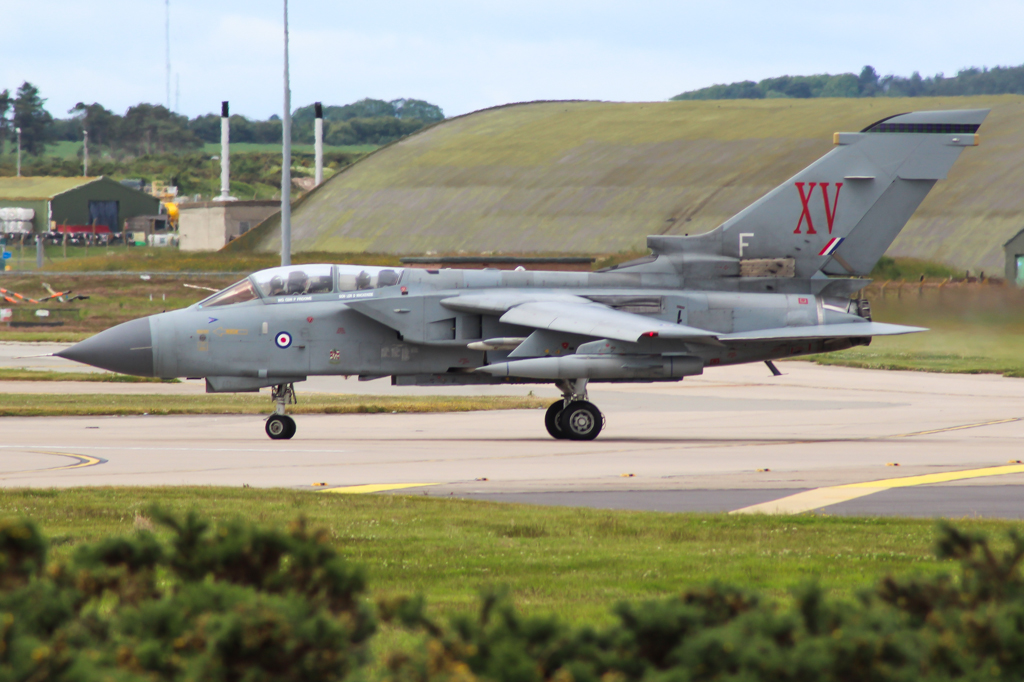
Panavia Tornado GR4 ZA602/F 'MacRoberts Reply' at RAF Lossiemouth in 2015

Since the Second World War, a series of aircraft operated by No. 15 Squadron have been named MacRobert's Reply. The tradition began in 1941 when Lady Rachel MacRobert, an American-born philanthropist, donated £25,000 to purchase a Short Stirling bomber in memory of her three sons, Alasdair, Roderic, and Iain, who were all killed in flying incidents, two whilst in RAF service.

The Stirling bomber, named MacRobert’s Reply, bore the MacRobert family crest and code 'LS-F', reflecting Lady MacRobert’s wish to honour her sons by continuing their fight. The first Stirling (N6086) flew twelve missions before crashing in 1942, and its replacement (W7531) continued the name until it was lost later that year. The tradition was revived in 1982 when a Buccaneer (XT287) took the name and continued with Tornado GR1 and GR4 aircraft with the name being applied to whichever aircraft was allocated 'F' as its tail-code. The tartan worn on the fin of the Tornados was the Robertson Hunting Tartan (Modern).

=== Memorial ===
A tree planted at the National Memorial Arboretum in Staffordshire commemorates the officers and airmen of No. 15 Squadron who lost their lives in the service of their country.

== Battle honours ==
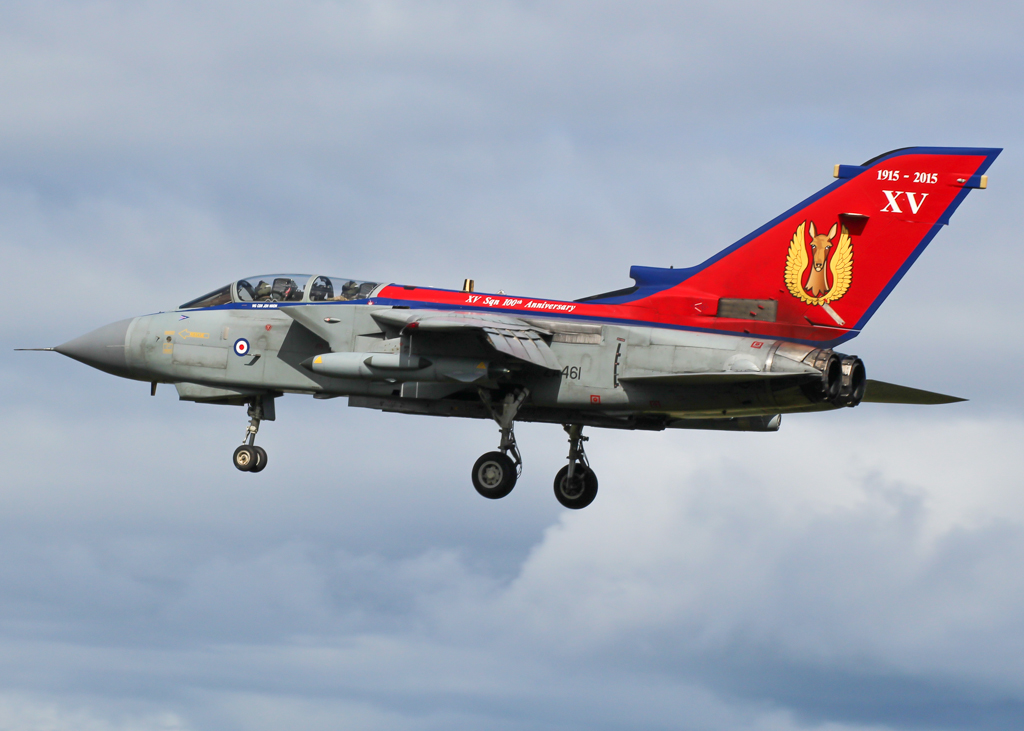
A No. 15 Squadron Panavia Tornado GR4 wearing a 100th anniversary paint scheme featuring a hind during 2015

No. 15 Squadron has received the following battle honours. Those marked with an asterisk (*) may be emblazoned on the squadron standard.

- Western Front (1915–1918)*
- Somme (1916)*
- Arras (1917)
- Cambrai (1917)*
- Somme (1918)
- Hindenburg Line (1918)*
- France and Low Countries (1939–1940)
- Meuse Bridges*
- Dunkirk (1940)
- Invasion Ports (1940)
- Fortress Europe (1941–1944)
- Ruhr (1941–1945)*
- Berlin (1941–1945)*
- Biscay Ports (1941–1945)
- France and Germany (1944–1945)
- Normandy (1944)*
- Gulf (1991)*

== See also ==
- List of Royal Air Force aircraft squadrons
