= Pablo Mason =

Royal Air Force pilot

Squadron Leader Paul Mason (born 1951), known as Pablo Mason, is a retired Royal Air Force pilot, who was part of the XV Squadron detachment to Bahrain as part of the RAF Tornado squadron during the Gulf War, and subsequently wrote about his experiences. Mason is known for his handlebar moustache, and his Biggles-like attitude and persona.

== RAF career ==
Mason joined the Royal Air Force (RAF) in 1973 after joining the Air Training Corps, 165 Castle Bromwich Squadron in 1969. He initially trained and qualified on helicopters, before transferring to fast jets and 16 Squadron with the Panavia Tornado GR1. His service included Northern Ireland and Hong Kong.

Mason was among the 24 RAF Tornado crews detached to Muharraq Airfield, Bahrain during the build-up to Operation Granby, the British military's contribution to Desert Storm, with the specific brief of knocking out Iraqi Air Force bases by bombing the runways. On Mason's first mission, an ultra-low-level daylight mission on Ar Rumaylah Southwest Air Base leading a flight of four Tornados, his number two crew of John Peters and navigator John Nichol were shot down and became prisoners of war. Mason led a total of 24 bombing sorties in Operation Granby, from ultra-low-level daylight, medium-level night bombing and, on 2 February 1991, the first-ever combined Buccaneer and Tornado attack using laser-guided bombs. During the Gulf War he was often seen on television representing the RAF.

Following his return from the Gulf, Mason's life was saved on 10 May 1991 when his navigator ejected the crew from his Tornado GR1, which crashed near Lubberstedt, Germany, on a training mission. The RAF investigation of the incident attributed the cause of the crash to pilot mishandling of the aircraft.

After the Gulf War, he remained in the public eye, particularly during the 1998/9 bombing of Iraq, which he publicly criticised;.

== After the RAF ==
After retirement from the RAF in 1991, Mason returned to his home in Leamington Spa, Warwickshire where he wrote his book Pablo's War. He and his wife run the Adams Hotel. While Mason flew as a senior pilot for MyTravel Airways, the charter airline division of the holiday company MyTravel Group plc, he flew both holiday makers and private charters. Mason was well known within the airline for his humorous, matter-of-fact style, telling a "rather miserable" bunch of holiday makers who made up the last flight of the 1997 season from Manchester Airport to the Greek island of Kefalonia, "Come on you miserable lot. You are going on your holidays - to the sunshine. You should be smiling, you miserable bunch." Mason's attitude transferred well to the public speaking circuit, while his knowledge of his craft resulted in him starting a fear of flying course.

In August 2007, Mason was piloting a MyTravel Airbus A320 on a private charter from Finland to Manchester, with the football team and directors of Blackburn Rovers who were returning from their 1-0 UEFA Cup victory over MyPa-47. Welsh international Robbie Savage had a fear of flying, and asked if he could see the cockpit, to which Mason agreed. Since the 11 September 2001 attacks, security on commercial flights, both pre- and in-flight, had been increased. MyTravel considered that Mason had broken these rules and endangered the safety of the flight. Although Savage had written to the company in support of Mason, and the football club had also written in support, on 8 October 2007 MyTravel dismissed Mason for gross misconduct. Mason stated that he would appeal against the dismissal, but MyTravel refused to reverse its decision.

Mason lost his tribunal case against Thomas Cook (My Travel) in March 2009 and so did not receive a pay-off from the company.

In 2014 he started working for Flight Simulators Midlands near Coventry airport where he instructs members of the public on Boeing 737 and 747 simulators.

== Media appearances ==
Mason is a regular contributor to the award-winning British aviation podcast, Flaps Podcast, with his "Mason's Minute" feature.

== Bibliography ==
- Mason, Pablo - Pablo's War - Bloomsbury Publishing, 12 Aug 1992, ISBN 0-7475-1234-5
- Mason, Pablo and Bartlett, Kim - Pablo's Travels - Little, Brown, 1 Feb 1996, ISBN 978-0-316-91400-0
