= Ar Rumaylah Southwest Air Base =

Location
- Coordinates: 30°21′21″N 047°06′36″E

Location of Ar Rumaylah Southwest Air Base, Iraq

Ar Rumaylah Southwest Air Base is a former Iraqi Air Force base in the Basra Governorate of Iraq.

== 1980s ==
Ar Rumaylah Air Base was a primary air base for the Iraqi Air Force. At each end of the main 10,000-foot runway are a dozen hardened aircraft shelters (HAS), also known as "Trapezoids" or "Yugos" which were built by Yugoslavian contractors some time prior to 1985 with multiple runways and taxiways, patterned after their Russian counterparts.

== 1991 Gulf War and Operation Iraqi Freedom (2003) ==
=== January 17, 1991 ===
At around 9:30 a.m. on January 17, 1991 (the first day of Operation Desert Storm), a four ship formation of R.A.F. GR.1 Tornados flying from Tabuk Airfield in Saudi Arabia, attacked Ar Rumaylah Southwest in the first Tornado daylight strike of the war. They each carried eight 1,000 Ib bombs to attack the HASs in a toss delivery attack. The attack occurred in conjunction with a US Marines Corps SEAD package of 24 F/A-18 Hornets and 2 EA-6B Prowlers which were attacking SA-6s to the east of the Ar Rumaylah.

During the attack, only two aircraft (The lead and No. 4 aircraft) were able to drop their bombs, in this case, on the southern HAS site, flying at 600 kts. They also encountered heavy AAA fire during the toss attack. After the attack, the No. 2 aircraft (ZD791), crewed by Flt Lt. John Peters and Flt Lt. John Nichol, were hit by an SA-16 IR SAM and were able to eject from their stricken jet. They were then captured as POWs. The lead aircraft was also locked on by Roland and SA-8 missile launchers.

=== Later Part of the War and Operation Iraqi Freedom ===
The base would be heavily attacked by Coalition air power during the rest January 1991, and seized by the U.S. 3rd Armored Cavalry Regiment in February 1991. It was abandoned by the Iraqi Air Force after the cease fire in late February.

It was again captured by Coalition forces during the 2003 invasion of Iraq.

== Present ==
Current aerial imagery shows that the operational structures around the airfield appear to have been demolished and removed. Today the concrete runway and series of taxiways remain exposed and deteriorating to the elements, being reclaimed by the desert.

== See also ==
- http://www.urbanghostsmedia.com/2016/02/abandoned-airfields-iraq-military-air-bases/
