= USS Grouse =

Several ships of the United States Navy have been named USS Grouse, after the grouse.

- USS Grouse (AMc-12) formerly New Bol, was launched in 1938
- USS Grouse (AMS-15) launched 20 February 1943
- USS Grouse (AM-398) was begun at the Defoe Shipbuilding Company in Bay City, Michigan, but her construction contract was terminated 12 August 1945
