= Operation Grouse =

Operation Grouse may refer to:

- Operation Grouse (Normandy), a British advance towards Tinchebray, France, in 1944
- Operation Grouse (Norway), a sabotage raid against the Vemork heavy water plant, Norway, in 1942
- Operation Grouse (Czechoslovakia), German Nazi operation against Czech partisans in Beskid Mountains, in 1944
