= Grouse Mountain (New Mexico) =

Landform in Catron County, New Mexico

- Location within New Mexico Location within the United States

Highest point
- Elevation: 10,145 ft (3,092 m)
- Prominence: 615 ft (187 m)
- Isolation: 2.37 mi (3.81 km) to Willow Mountain
- Coordinates: 33°19′43″N 108°42′59″W

Geography
- Location: Catron County, New Mexico, United States
- Parent range: Mogollon Mountains
- Topo map: USGS Grouse Mountain

Geology
- Rock age(s): Tertiary, between 66 and 2.6 million years ago
- Rock type(s): Datil Formation, undifferentiated rhyolite
- Volcanic field: Mogollon-Datil volcanic field, Bursum Caldera

Grouse Mountain is located in the Gila Wilderness in Catron County, New Mexico. Grouse Mountain is found in the Mogollon Mountains. For New Mexico, Grouse Mountain is ranked the 198th highest peak, and 619th by prominence.

Grouse Mountain is 7 miles (11 km) southeast of Mogollon, New Mexico and can be accessed via the Holt Apache Trail.
