= 9K38 Igla =

Russian man-portable surface-to-air missile

Igla, SA-18 Grouse, SA-N-10 Grouse
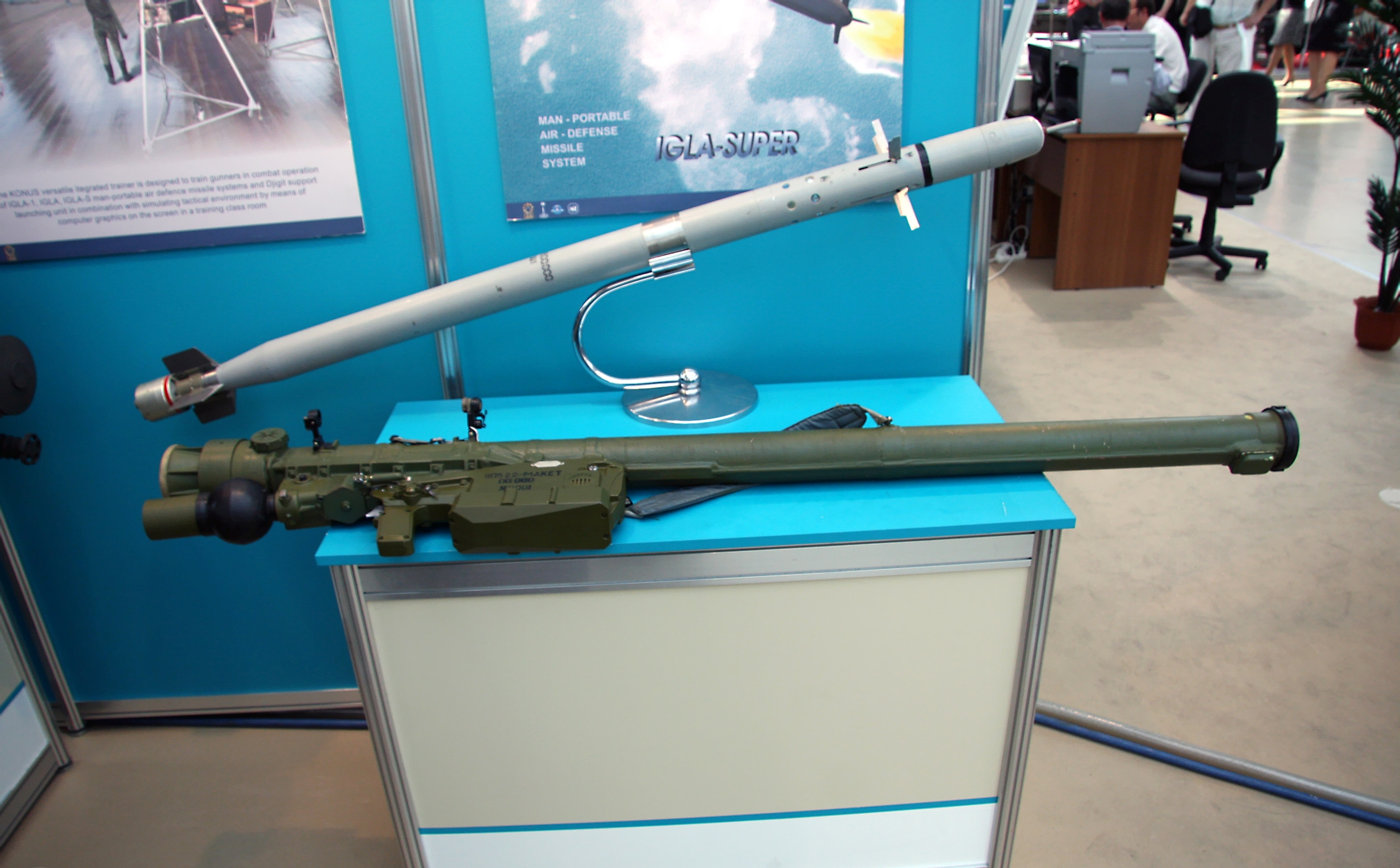
- 9K338 Igla-S (SA-24) missile and launch tube
- Type: Man-portable air-defense systems (MANPADS)
- Place of origin: Soviet Union

Service history
- In service: 1981–present
- Used by: See Operators
- Wars: Iran War 2026; Iran–Iraq War; Sri Lankan Civil War; Siachen conflict Somali Civil War; Gulf War; Yugoslav Wars; Bosnian War; Cenepa War; Second Chechen War; Iraq War; First Libyan Civil War; Syrian civil war Russo-Ukrainian War; Sinai insurgency Kurdish–Turkish conflict (2015–present); 2020 Nagorno-Karabakh conflict Gaza war 2026 United States strikes in Venezuela

Production history
- Manufacturer: KB Mashinostroyeniya – Developer of the system
- Produced: 1981–present

Specifications
- Mass: Missile weight: 10.8 kg (24 lb); Full system: 17.9 kg (39 lb)
- Length: 1.574 m (5.16 ft)
- Diameter: 72 mm
- Warhead: 1.17 kg (2.6 lb) with 390 g (14 oz) explosive
- Detonation mechanism: Contact and grazing fuze
- Engine: Solid fuel rocket motor
- Operational range: 5.0 km (3.1 mi) – Igla-1; 5.2 km (3.2 mi) – Igla; 6.0 km (3.7 mi) – Igla-S
- Flight ceiling: 3.5 km (11,000 ft)
- Maximum speed: 570 m/s (peak), about Mach 1.9
- Guidance system: Dual waveband infra-red (S-version)

The 9K38 Igla (Russian: Игла́, lit. 'needle', NATO reporting name SA-18 Grouse) is a Soviet/Russian man-portable infrared homing surface-to-air missile (SAM) system. A simplified, earlier version is known as the 9K310 Igla-1 (NATO: SA-16 Gimlet), and the latest variant is the 9K338 Igla-S (SA-24 Grinch).

The Igla-1 entered service in 1981, the Igla in 1983, and the Igla-S in 2004. The Igla has been supplemented by the 9K333 Verba since 2014.

== History ==
Russian soldiers demonstrate use of Igla MANPADS

The development of the Igla short-range man-portable air defense system (MANPADS) began in the Kolomna OKB in 1972. Contrary to what is commonly reported, the Igla is not an improved version of the earlier Strela family (Strela-2 and Strela-3), but an all-new project. The main goals were to create a missile with better resistance to countermeasures and wider engagement envelope than the earlier Strela series MANPADS systems.

Technical difficulties in the development quickly made it obvious that the development would take far longer than anticipated, however, and in 1978 the program split in two: while the development of the full-capability Igla would continue, a simplified version (Igla-1) with a simpler IR seeker based on that of the earlier Strela-3 would be developed to enter service earlier than the full-capability version could be finished.

=== Igla-1 ===
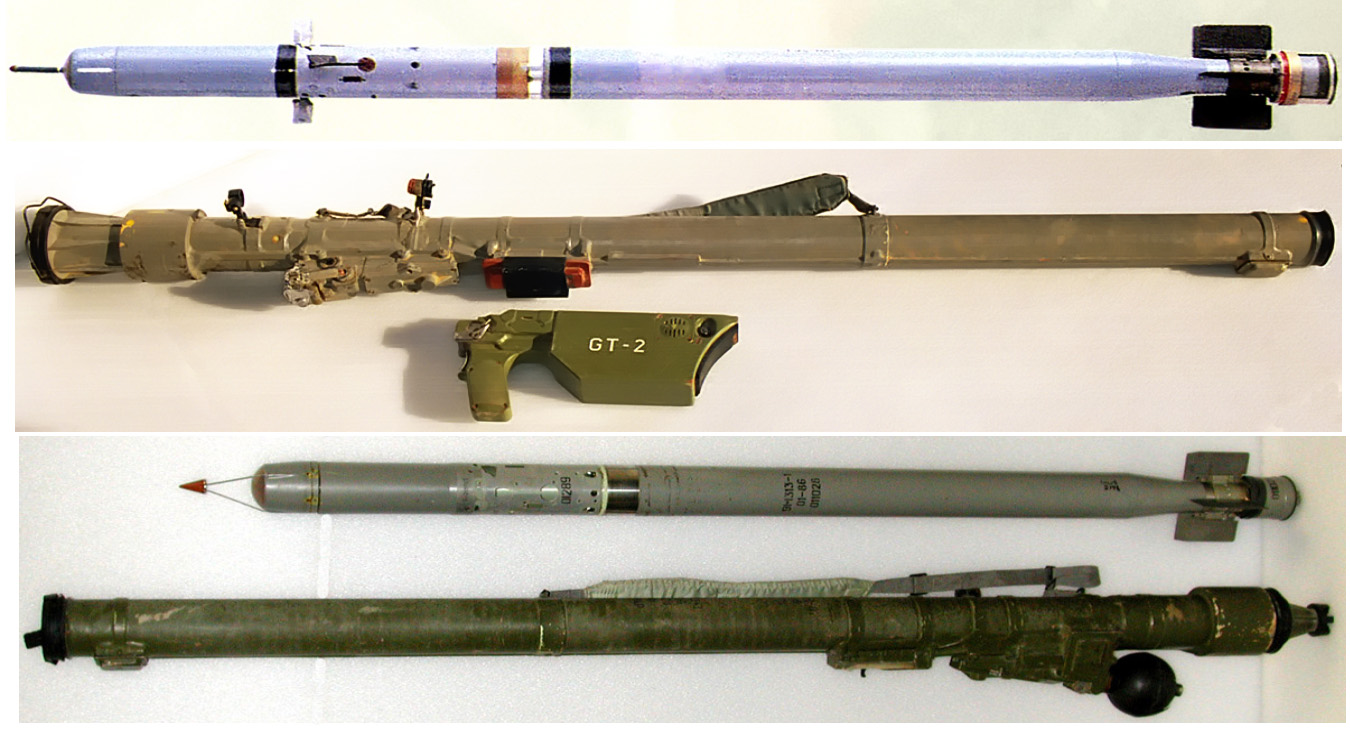
9K38 Igla (SA-18) missile and launcher top and 9K310 Igla-1 (SA-16) missile and launcher below

The 9K310 Igla-1 system and its 9M313 missile were accepted into service in the Soviet Army on 11 March 1981. The main differences from the Strela-3 included an optional Identification Friend or Foe system to prevent firing on friendly aircraft, an automatic lead and super elevation to simplify shooting and reduce minimum firing range, a slightly larger rocket, reduced drag and better guidance system extend maximum range and improve performance against fast and maneuverable targets, an improved lethality on target achieved by a combination of delayed impact fuzing, terminal maneuver to hit the fuselage rather than jet nozzle, an additional charge to set off the remaining rocket fuel (if any) on impact, an improved resistance to infrared countermeasures (both decoy flares and ALQ-144 series jamming emitters), and slightly improved seeker sensitivity.

The seeker has two detectors – a cooled MWIR InSb detector for detection of the target and uncooled PbS SWIR detector for detection of IR decoys (flares). The built-in logic determines whether the detected object is a target or a decoy. The latest version (Igla-S) is reported to have additional detectors around the main seeker to provide further resistance against pulsed IRCM devices commonly used on helicopters.

The 9M313 missile features a drag-reducing aerospike mounted on a tripod (Igla's 9M39 missile has an aerospike attached directly to the seeker dome, resembling a needle, which is perhaps not coincidentally the translation of its codename, Russian: игла), which reduces a shock wave, thus providing less dome heating and greater range. The name Igla is derived from these devices.

Like many other MANPADS, Igla-1 and Igla feature so-called rolling airframe missiles. These missiles roll in flight (900–1,200 rpm) so steering the missile requires just a single pair of control surfaces, unlike roll-stabilized missiles, which require separate control surfaces for pitch and yaw. Both 9M313 and 9M39 missiles contain a gas generator, which drives a small gas turbine to provide electrical power, and the pistons, which move the canards used to steer the missile in a bang-bang mode. In addition to that, two exhaust tubes of the gas generator are placed perpendicular to the steering canards to provide maneuverability immediately after launch when the missile airspeed is too low for canards to be effective. Later versions of Igla are reported to use proportional control to drive the canards, which enables greater precision and less oscillation of the flight path.

According to the manufacturer, South African tests have shown the Igla's superiority over the contemporary (1982 service entry) but smaller and lighter American FIM-92A Stinger missile. According to Kolomna OKB, the Igla-1 has a P_{k} (probability of kill) of 0.30 to 0.48 against unprotected targets which is reduced to 0.24 in the presence of decoy flares and jamming. In another report, the manufacturer claimed a P_{k} of 0.59 against an approaching and 0.44 against receding F-4 Phantom II fighter not employing infrared countermeasures or evasive maneuvers.

=== Igla ===
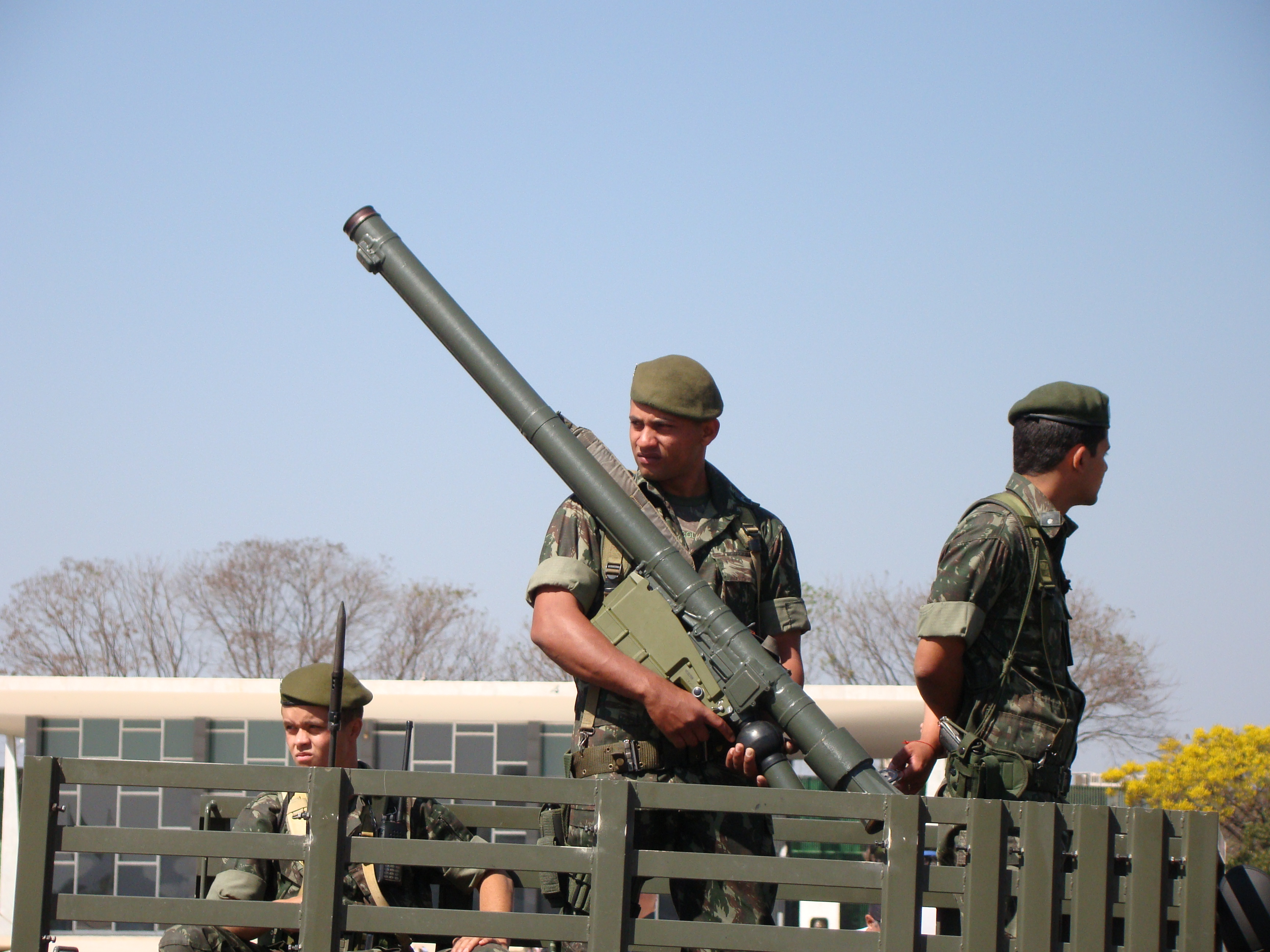
Brazilian soldier with 9K38 Igla (SA-18)

The full-capability 9K38 Igla with its 9M39 missile was finally accepted into service in the Soviet Army in 1983. The main improvements over the Igla-1 included much improved resistance against flares and jamming, a more sensitive seeker, expanding forward-hemisphere engagement, capability to include a tandem charge against armored targets, capability to engage straight-approaching fighters (all-aspect capability) under favourable circumstances, a slightly longer range, a higher-impulse, shorter-burning rocket with higher peak velocity (but approximately same time of flight to maximum range). The new 9E410 seeker operated in both IR and UV wavelengths, which decreased its susceptibility to flares, and was effective in countering lamp-style IR jammers (but not shutter-types). The Finnish Defense Forces—which operated the Igla in the army and the French Mistral in the navy—felt that the Igla's seeker was superior over the Mistral's.

The naval variant of 9K38 Igla has the NATO reporting name SA-N-10 Grouse.

The Igla–1M missile consists of a Ground Power Supply Source (GPSS), Launching Tube, Launching Mechanism & Missile (9M313–1).

There is also a two-barrel 9K38 missile launcher called Dzhigit.

=== 9K338 Igla-S (SA-24 Grinch) ===
The newest variant, which is a substantially improved variant with longer range, more sensitive seeker, improved resistance to latest countermeasures, and a heavier warhead. Manufacturer reports hit probability of 0.8–0.9. State tests were completed in December 2001 and the system entered service in 2002. Series produced by the Degtyarev plant since 1 December 2004.

=== Replacement ===
Since 2014 the Igla is being replaced in Russian service by the new 9K333 Verba (Willow) MANPADS. The Verba's primary feature is its multispectral optical seeker, using three sensors as opposed to the Igla-S' two. Cross-checking sensors against one another better discriminates between relevant targets and decoys, and decreases the chance of disruption from countermeasures, including lasers that attempt to blind missiles.

== Operational history ==
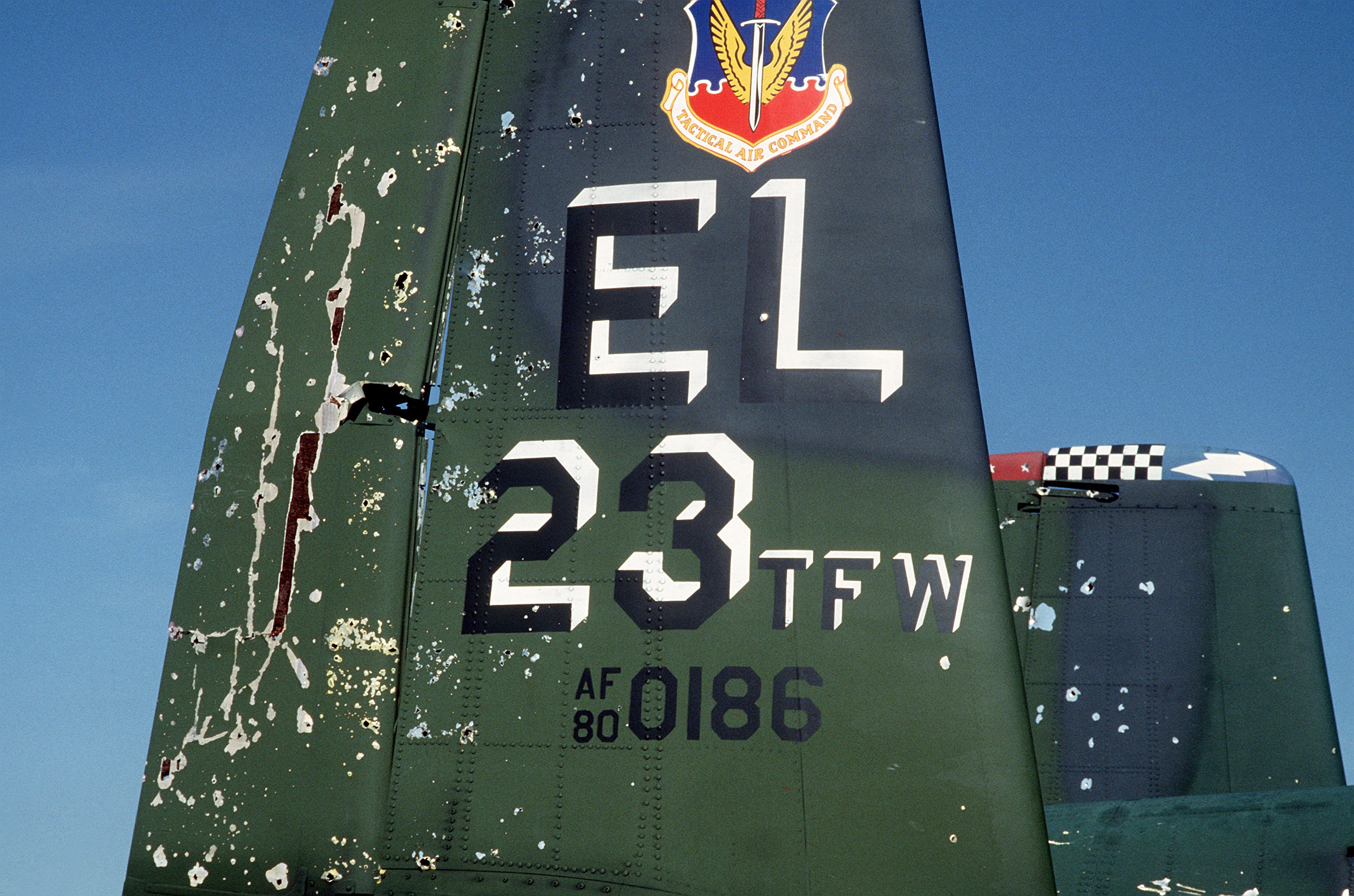
Tail section of a USAF A-10A Thunderbolt II aircraft showing damage sustained from an Iraqi SA-16 missile during Operation Desert Storm, 15 February 1991

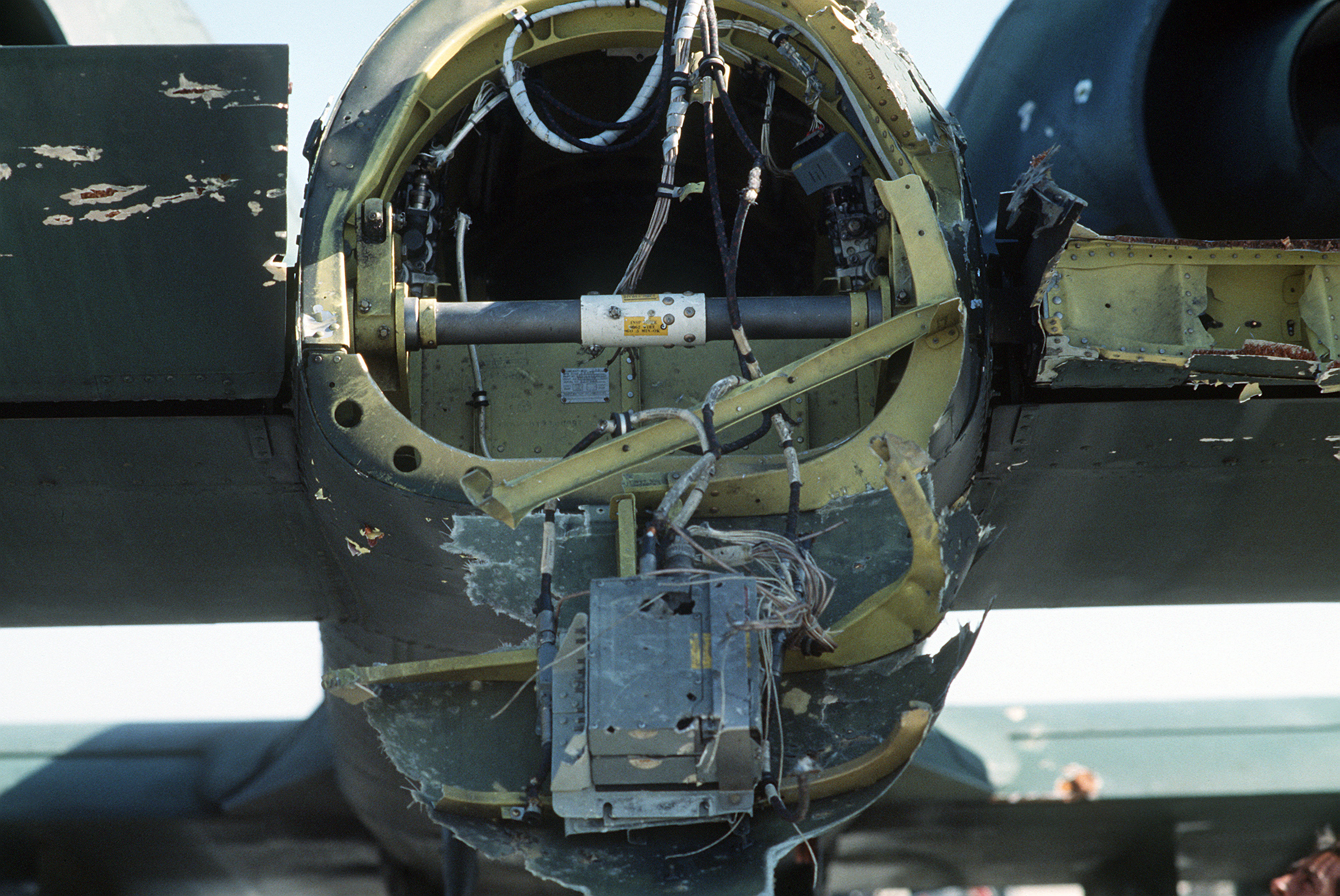
Rear view of the aircraft

=== India ===
==== Operation Trishul Shakti (1992) ====
From 28 July 1992 to 2 August 1992 the Indian Army mounted Operation Trishul Shakti to protect the Bahadur post in Chulung when it was attacked by a large Pakistani assault team. On 1 August 1992, two Pakistani Lama helicopters were attacked by an Indian Igla missile battery and Brig. Masood Navid Anwari (PA 10117) then Force Commander Northern Areas and other accompanying troops were killed. This led to a loss of momentum on the Pakistani side and the assault stalled. It was the first combat usage of an Igla system, as well as it the Igla's and the Indian Army's first MANPADS kill.

=== Iraq ===
==== Desert Storm (1991) ====
The first combat use of the Igla-1E was during the British Gulf War Operation Granby. On 17 January 1991, a Panavia Tornado bomber of the Royal Air Force was shot down by an Iraqi MANPADS that may have been an Igla-1E (or Strela-3) after an unsuccessful bombing mission. The crew, Flt Lts J G Peters and A J Nichol, were both captured and held as prisoners of war (POWs) until the cessation of hostilities.

In addition, an Igla-1E shot down an American F-16 on 27 February 1991. The pilot was captured.

It is uncertain if an AC-130H lost was hit by a 'Strela' missile or a more recent Igla since Iraq had SA-7, SA-14 and SA-16 missiles at the time, according to the SIPRI database.

==== From 2003 ====
Among the Coalition force losses to MANPADS during the Iraq War some were reported as losses to Igla-1E (SA-16) missiles.

=== Rwanda ===
Igla-1E missiles were used in the 1994 shoot down of a Rwandan government flight, killing the presidents of Rwanda and Burundi and sparking the Rwandan genocide.

=== Cenepa War ===
During the Cenepa War between Ecuador and Peru, both the Ecuadorian Army and the Peruvian Army (which had 90 functioning firing units) utilized Igla-1E missiles against aircraft and helicopters.

A Peruvian Air Force Mi-25 attack helicopter was shot down on 7 February 1995 around Base del Sur, killing the three crewmen, while an Ecuadorian Air Force A-37 Dragonfly was hit but managed to land on 11 February. Hits on additional Ecuadorian aircraft were claimed but could not be confirmed.

=== Bosnia ===
On 16 April 1994 during the Siege of Goražde, while attempting to bomb a Serbian tank an RAF Sea Harrier was shot down by an Igla fired by the Army of Republika Srpska. The pilot ejected and was rescued by the Army of the Republic of Bosnia and Herzegovina.

During Operation Deliberate Force, on 30 August 1995; a French Mirage 2000D was shot down over Pale by an Igla fired by air defence units of the Army of Republika Srpska. The pilots, Lt. Jose-Manuel Souvignet (pilot) and Capt. Frederic Chiffot (back-seater), were captured and freed in December 1995.

Members of the air defense battalion of the Croatian 2nd Guards Brigade shot down two G-4 Super Galeb by Igla on September 19, 1995 in Bosanski Novi. Both aircraft belonged to the Army of Republika Srpska.

=== Yugoslavia ===
During Operation Allied Force, two A-10 Thunderbolt II aircraft were hit by Igla-1E missiles. On 2 May 1999, one A-10 was hit over Kosovo and was forced to make an emergency landing at Skopje Airport in north Macedonia due to damage. The following day, an A-10 was hit beneath the cockpit, however serious damage was avoided due to the warhead failing to detonate.

=== Chechnya ===
The 2002 Khankala Mi-26 crash occurred on 19 August 2002 when a team of Chechen separatists brought down a Russian Mil Mi-26 helicopter in a minefield with an Igla; this resulted in the death of 127 Russian soldiers in the greatest loss of life in the history of helicopter aviation. It was also the most deadly aviation disaster ever suffered by the Russian armed forces.

=== Egypt ===
On 26 January 2014, the militant group Ansar Bait al-Maqdis shot down an Egyptian Mi-17 over the northern Sinai peninsula using a suspected Igla-1E or Igla. How the group came to obtain the weapon is currently unknown.

=== Libya ===
During the 2011 military intervention in Libya, Libyan loyalist forces engaged coalition aircraft with a certain number of Igla-S. Three Igla-S were fired against British Apache attack helicopters of the 656 Squadron Army Air Corps operating from the amphibious assault ship HMS Ocean. According to the squadron commander at the time, they were all dodged by insistent use of decoy flares by the gunships who in exchange successfully engaged the shooters.

On 23 March 2015, a Libya Dawn-operated MiG-23UB was shot down with an Igla-S (reportedly a truck-mounted Strelets variant) while bombing Al Watiya airbase (near Zintan), controlled by forces from the internationally recognized House of Representatives. Both pilots were killed.

=== Plot against Air Force One ===
On 12 August 2003, as a result of a sting operation arranged as a result of cooperation between the American, British and Russian intelligence agencies, Hemant Lakhani, a British national, was intercepted attempting to bring what he had thought was an older-generation Igla into the United States. He is said to have intended the missile to be used in an attack on Air Force One, the American presidential plane, or on a commercial US airliner, and is understood to have planned to buy 50 more of these weapons.

After the FSB detected the dealer in Russia, he was approached by US undercover agents posing as terrorists wanting to shoot down a commercial plane. He was then provided with an inert Igla by undercover Russian agents, and arrested in Newark, New Jersey, when making the delivery to the undercover US agent. An Indian citizen residing in Malaysia, Moinuddeen Ahmed Hameed and an American Yehuda Abraham who allegedly provided money to buy the missile were also arrested. Yehuda Abraham is president and CEO of Ambuy Gem Corp. Lakhani was convicted by jury in April 2005, and was sentenced to 47 years in prison.

=== Syria ===
has surfaced showing rebels using an Igla-1E on a Syrian government helicopter. Such weapons were believed to have been looted from a Syrian army base in Aleppo in February 2013. In 2014, a member of the rebel group Harakat Hazm was filmed aiming an Igla-1E into the air on the same day that the group was filmed operating BGM-71 TOW missiles.[34] Whether these weapons were raided from regime stockpiles or supplied via overseas is unknown.[citation needed] However, Russia reportly denied Syrian demand for Iglas in 2005 and 2007, fearing these weapons to be used by Hezbollah.[35]

=== Ukraine ===
On 14 June 2014, Russian separatist forces near Luhansk International Airport in Eastern Ukraine shot down an IL-76 of the Ukrainian Airforce probably using an Igla MANPADS, killing all 49 Ukrainian service personnel on board.

The Igla saw extensive use by Ukrainian forces during the early stages of the Russian invasion of Ukraine.

On March 22, 2022, the Ukrainian 80th Air Assault Brigade claimed to have shot down a Russian cruise missile over the Mykolaiv Oblast with an Igla system.

On April 17, 2022, Ukrainian forces reported shooting down a Ka-52 attack helicopter with an Igla MANPADS.

On April 21, 2022, Ukrainian forces located in the Kharkiv Oblast reportedly shot down a Russian Su-34 aircraft with an Igla system.

On May 22, 2022, Ukrainian paratroopers from Lviv downed a Russian Su-25 attack aircraft with an Igla system.

On June 18, 2022, Ukraine's 72nd Separate Mechanized Brigade downed a Russian Sukhoi Su-25 attack aircraft with an Igla system.

On October 10, 2022, Ukrainian soldiers claimed to have shot down a Russian cruise missile with a 9K38 Igla.

On June 28, 2024, the National Guard of Ukraine claimed to have shot down a Russian Su-25 fighter jet over Donetsk Oblast using an Igla missile.

On February 8, 2025, the Ukrainian Defense Ministry announced the destruction of a Su-25 near Toretsk in Donetsk Oblast, probably with an Igla MANPADS.

=== Nagorno Karabakh ===
On 12 November 2014, Azerbaijani forces shot down an Armenian Army Mi-24 of a formation of two which were flying near the Azerbaijani border. All three on board died when the helicopter was hit by an Igla-S MANPADS fired by Azerbaijani soldiers while flying at low altitude, and crashed.

During the 2020 conflict, reports suggest that Armenian air defence units used Igla-S and Igla-E1 to shootdown a multitude of Azerbaijani aircraft, including several Bayraktar TB2 unmanned combat aerial vehicle (UCAV).

=== Turkey ===
On 13 May 2016, PKK militants shot down a Turkish Army Bell AH-1W SuperCobra attack helicopter using 9K38 Igla (SA-18 Grouse) version of this missile system. The missile severed the tail section from the rest of the helicopter, causing it to fragment in midair and crash, killing the two pilots on board. The Turkish government first claimed that it fell due to technical failure before it became clear that it was shot down. The PKK later released video footage of the rocket being fired and striking the helicopter. The Igla shooter, named Torhildan Derwiş (code name Müjdat Taşdemir), was killed a year later in Diyarbakir province in a battle with Turkish security forces.

== Variants ==
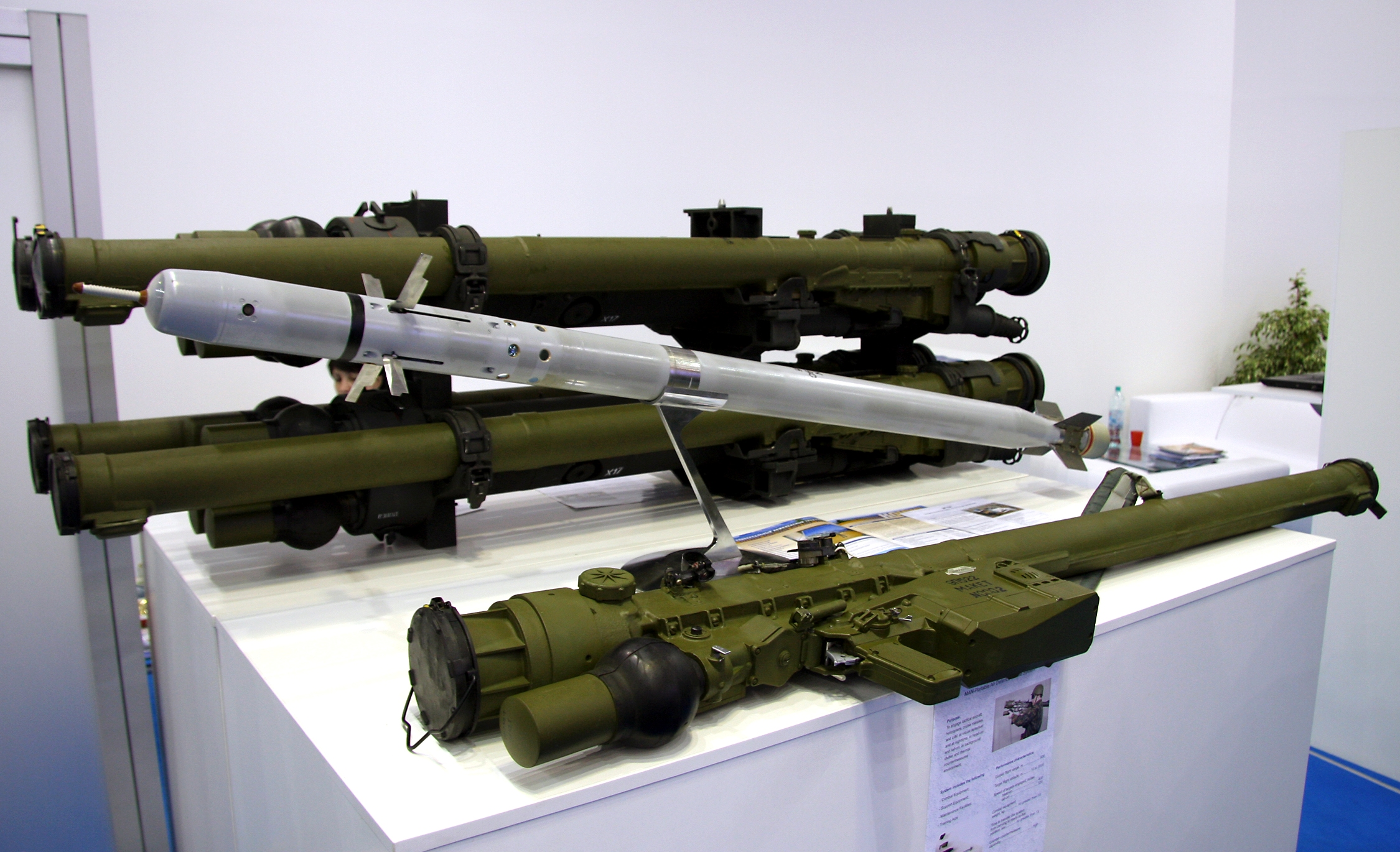
An Igla-S missile with its launch tube

- Igla-1 is a simplified early production version. It is known in the West as SA-16 Gimlet. It had a maximum range of 5000 m and could reach targets at a maximum altitude of 2500 m.
- Igla-1E is an export version. It has been exported to a number of countries.
- Igla (SA-18 Grouse) is a standard production version. It was adopted in 1983. Currently it is in service with more than 30 countries, including Russia.
- Igla-D, version developed specially for the Soviet airborne troops. Its launch tube can be disassembled and carried in two separate sections in order to reduce dimensions.
- Igla-M is a naval version for the naval boats. Its Western designation is SA-N-10 Grouse.
- Igla-V is an air-to-air version, used on helicopters.
- Igla-N is a version with much larger and more powerful warhead.
- Igla-S, sometimes referred as Igla-Super. It is an improved variant in the Igla, which entered service with Russian Army in 2004. It is known in the West as SA-24 Grinch.

== Comparison chart to other MANPADS ==
	9K34 Strela-3 /SA-14	9K38 Igla /SA-18	9K310 Igla-1 /SA-16	9K338 Igla-S /SA-24	FIM-92C Stinger	Grom	Starstreak
Service entry	1974	1983	1981	2004	1987	1995	1997
Weight, full system, ready to shoot kg (lb)	16.0 (35.3)	17.9 (39)	17.9 (39)	19 (42)	14.3 (32)	16.5 (36)	20.00 (44.09)
Weight, missile kg (lb)	10.3 (23)	10.8 (24)	10.8 (24)	11.7 (26)	10.1 (22)	10.5 (23)	14.00 (30.86)
Weight, warhead kg (lb) g (oz)	1.17 (2.6), 390 (14) HMX	1.17 (2.6), 390 (14) HMX	1.17 (2.6), 390 (14) HMX	2.5 (5.5), 585 (20.6) HMX	1.0 (2.2); HTA-3	1.27 (2.8)	3x 0.90 (2.0) tungsten alloy darts, 3x 450 (16) PBX-98
Warhead type	Directed-energy blast fragmentation	Directed-energy blast fragmentation	Directed-energy blast fragmentation	Directed-energy blast fragmentation	Blast fragmentation	Blast fragmentation	Blast fragmentation
Fuze type	Impact and grazing fuze.	Delayed impact, magnetic and grazing.	Delayed impact, magnetic and grazing.	Delayed impact, magnetic and grazing.	Delayed impact.	Impact.	Delayed impact, armour-piercing.
Flight speed, average / peak m/s (mph)	470 (1,100) sustained	600 (1,300) / 800 (1,800)	570 (1,300) sustained (in + temperature)	?	700 (1,600) / 750 (1,700)	580 (1,300) / 650 (1,500)	1,190 (2,700) / 1,360 (3,000)
Maximum range m (ft)	4,100 (13,500)	5,200 (17,100)	5,000 (16,000)	6,000 (20,000)	4,500 (14,800)	5,500 (18,000)	7,000 (23,000)+
Maximum target speed, receding m/s (mph)	260 (580)	360 (810)	360 (810)	400 (890)	?	320 (720)	?
Maximum target speed, approaching m/s (mph)	310 (690)	320 (720)	320 (720)	320 (720)	?	360 (810)	?
Seeker head type	Nitrogen-cooled, lead sulfide (PbS)	Nitrogen-cooled, Indium antimonide (InSb) and uncooled lead sulfide (PbS)	Nitrogen-cooled, Indium antimonide (InSb)	?	Argon-cooled, Indium antimonide (InSb) and UV flare rejection channel	?	Laser beam rider (LBR)
Seeker scanning	FM-modulated	FM-modulated	FM-modulated	FM-modulated	Rosette-scanning	FM-modulated	Low intensity modulated-laser-homing darts
Seeker notes		Aerospike to reduce supersonic wave drag	Tripod-mounted nosecone to reduce supersonic wave drag				Low laser beam energy levels ensuring no warning to target

== Operators ==
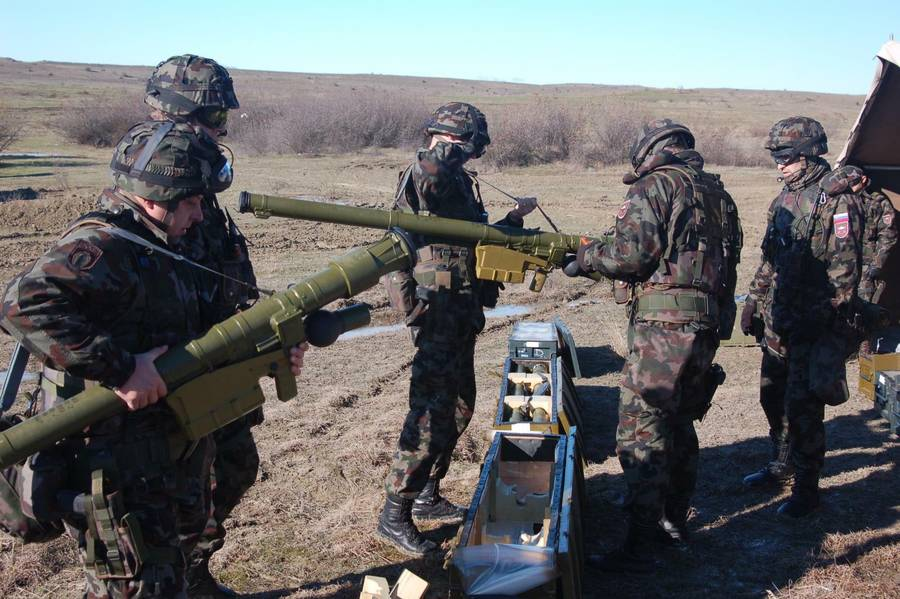
In Slovenian service showing storage crates

Igla and Igla-1 SAMs have been exported from the former Soviet Union to over 30 countries, including Angola, Bosnia and Herzegovina, Botswana, Brazil, Bulgaria, Peshmarga, Croatia, Cuba, East Germany, Egypt, Hamas, Ecuador, Eritrea, Finland, Hungary, India, Iran, Iraq, Malaysia, Mexico, Morocco, North Korea, North Macedonia, Peru, Poland, Serbia, Singapore, Slovakia, Slovenia, South Korea, Sri Lanka, Thailand, Turkey, Ukraine, United Arab Emirates, Vietnam and Zimbabwe. Several guerrilla and terrorist organizations are also known to have Iglas. Alleged Operatives of the Liberation Tigers of Tamil Eelam a terrorist organization fighting for a homeland for Tamils in the island of Sri Lanka were arrested in August 2006 by undercover agents of the FBI posing as arms dealers, while trying to purchase the Igla. In 2003 the unit cost was approximately US$60,000–80,000.

Large numbers have been sold to the government of Venezuela, which raised United States concerns that they may end up in the hands of Colombian guerrillas. Photo evidence of the truck mounted twin version in service with the Libyan Army emerged in March 2011. 482 Igla-S missiles were imported from Russia in 2004. Some were unaccounted at the end of the civil war and they could have ended up in Iranian inventory. Israeli officials say Igla-S systems were looted from Libyan warehouses in 2011 and transported by Iranians through Sudan and turned over to militants in Gaza and Lebanon.

== Igla-1 (SA-16) ==
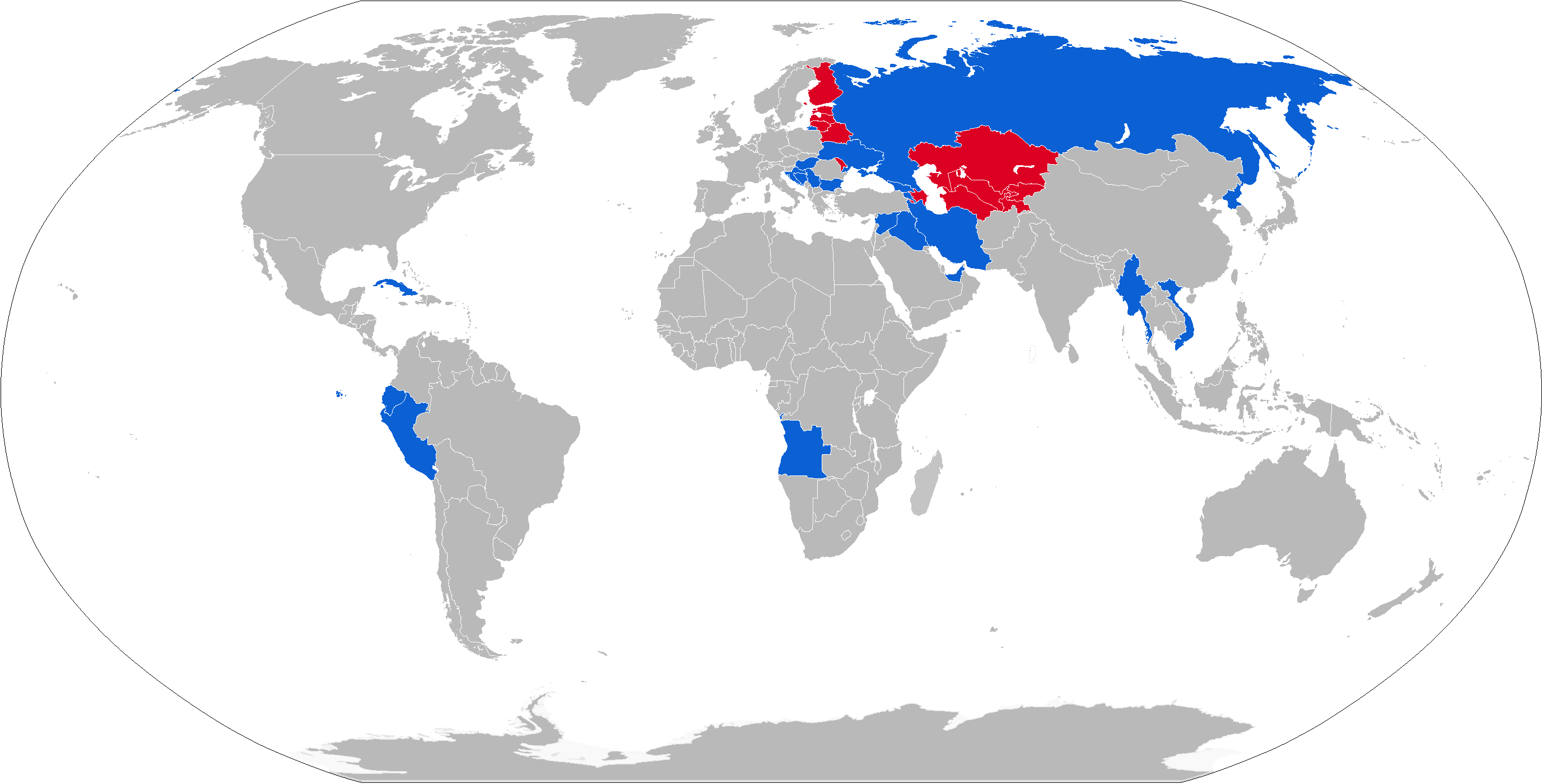
SA-16 operators Current Former

=== Current operators ===
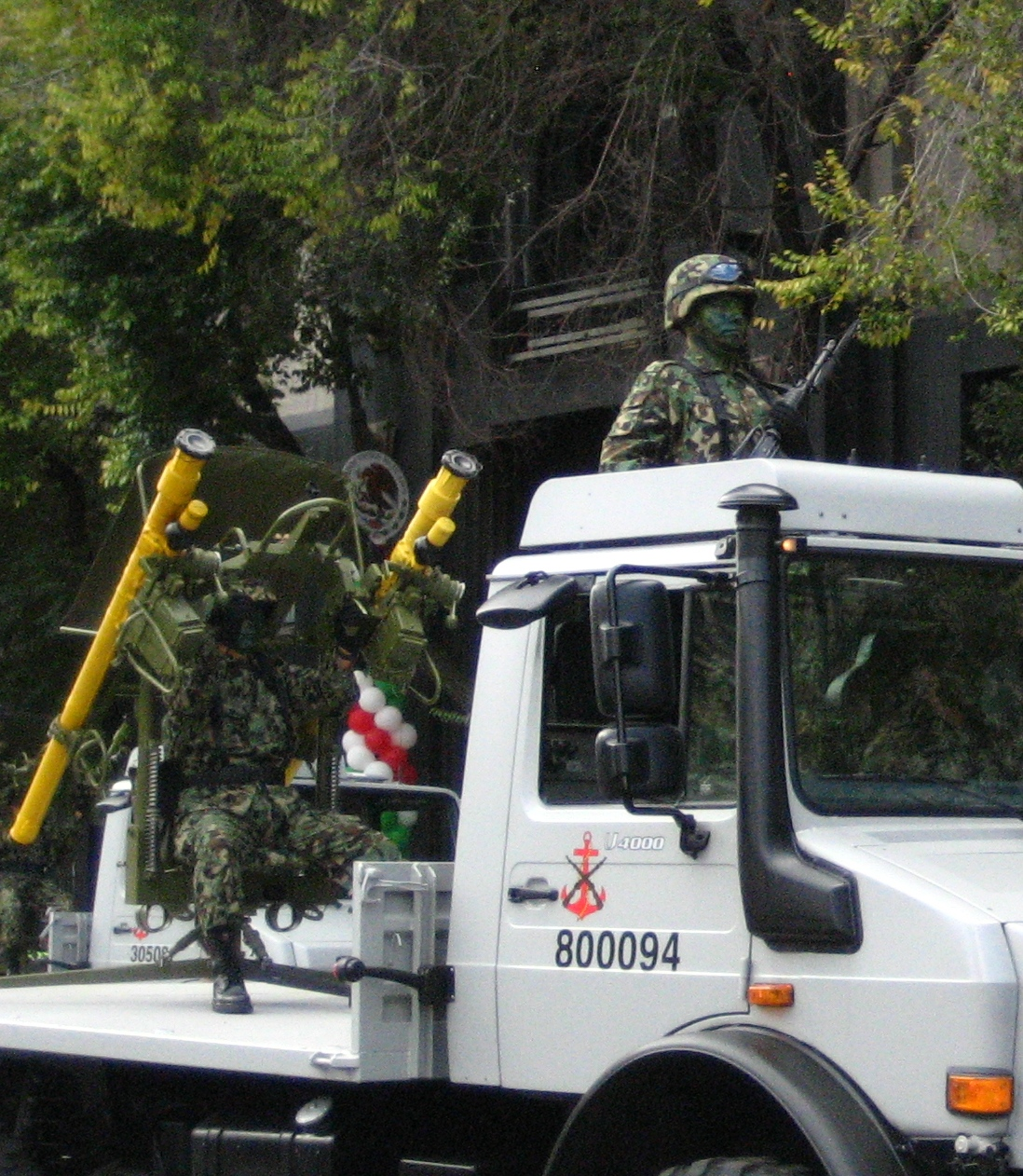
Mexican Marines manning a Russian 9K38 Igla surface-to-air missile (SAM) dual missile launch platform mounted on a Mercedes-Benz Unimog truck of the Mexican Navy in 2009

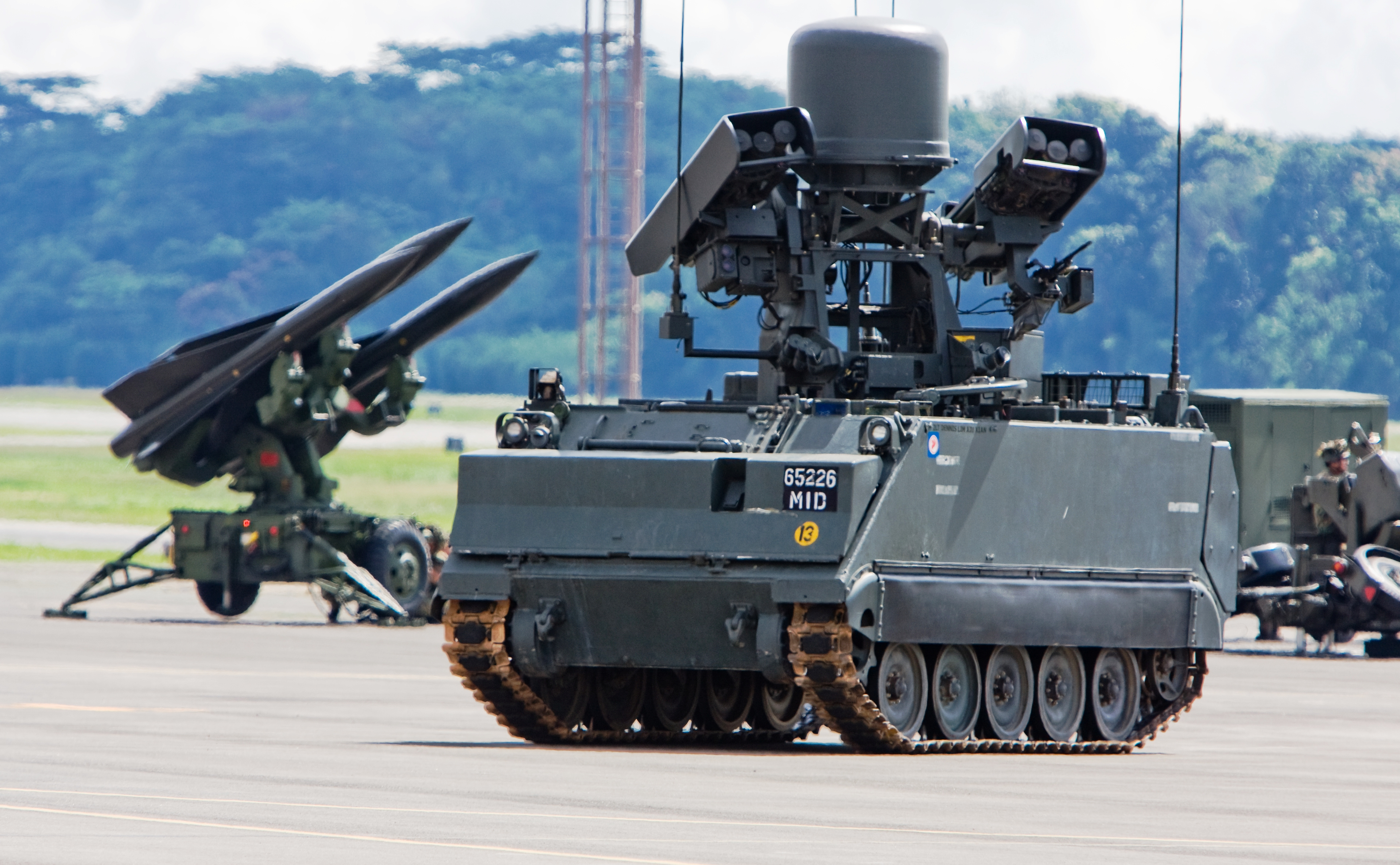
Republic of Singapore Air Force M113A2 Ultra Mechanised Igla Integrated Fire Unit (IFU) with mast-mounted cylindrical-shaped fire-control radar

- Al-Shabaab
- Angola
- Armenia
- Azerbaijan
- Bosnia and Herzegovina: 20 pieces.
- Botswana
- Bulgaria: Produced locally by VMZ Sopot.
- Chad
- Croatia
- Cuba
- Ecuador
- Ethiopia
- Georgia
- Hungary
- Hezbollah
- Iran
- Iraq
- Kazakhstan
- Kurdistan Workers' Party (PKK)
- Malaysia: 40 Djigit launchers, 382 MANPADS bought in 2002
- Mexico
- North Korea: Locally produced.
- North Macedonia
- Myanmar: Licensed production since 2004. According to Arms Trade RTF by Stockholm International Peace Research Institute, 1,000 SA-16 have been produced as of 2014.
- Peru: SA-16. Upgrades/improvements by Diseños Casanave.
- Romania: Igla-1M for marine forces and on Delfinul submarine.
- Russia
- Serbia
- Sri Lanka: provided by India in 2007, 54 operational as of 2020
- Singapore: Produced under license.
- South Korea: Received as debt payment from Russia.
- South Sudan
- Tigray Defense Forces
- Transnistria
- Ukraine
- United Arab Emirates
- Vietnam Produce under license. 48 launchers supplied in 2001–2002.
  - Vietnam People's Navy (400 missiles)

=== Former operators ===
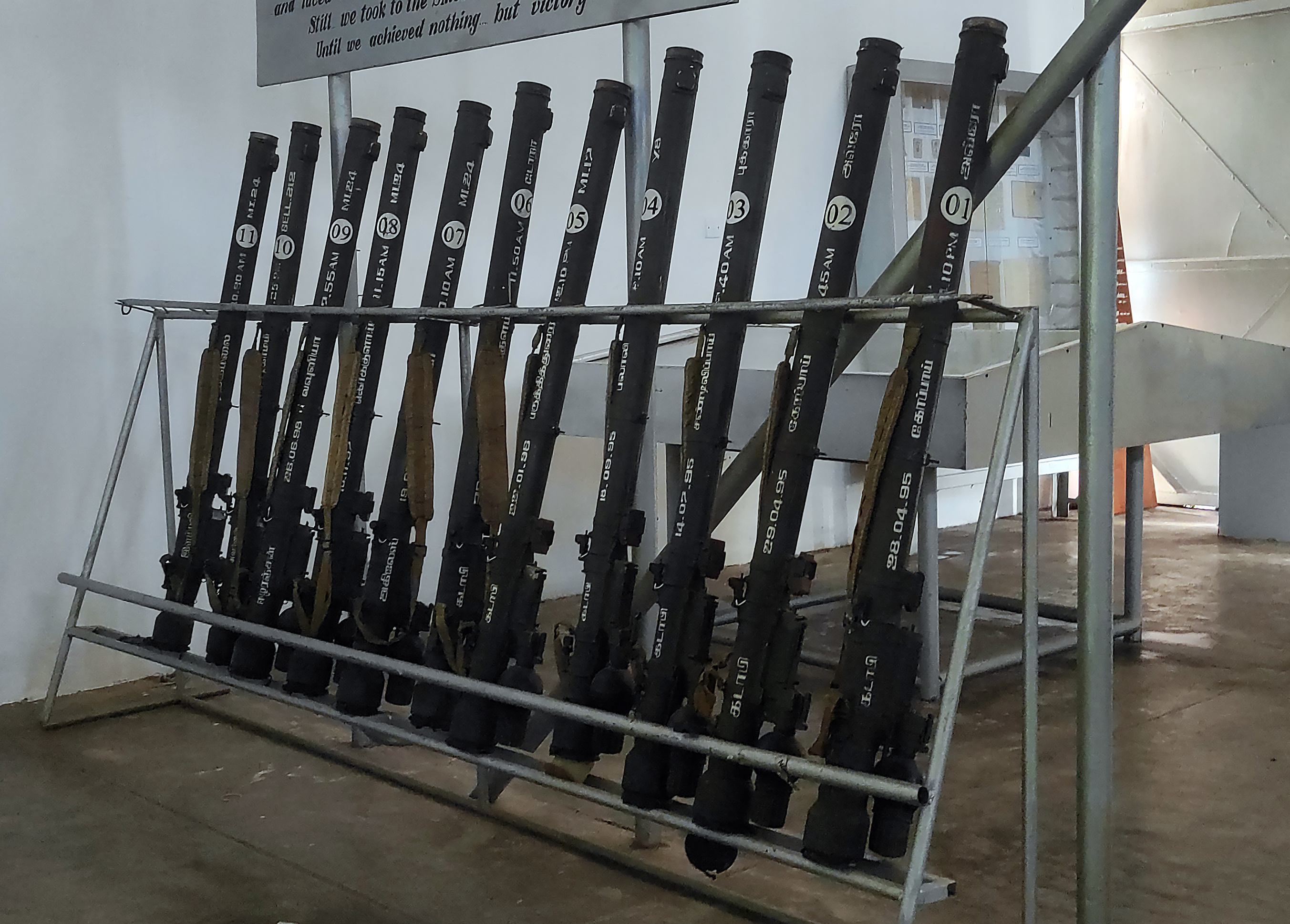
Sri Lankan Army captured a number of 9K38 Igla launch tubes from the Liberation Tigers of Tamil Eelam, and these were used by the LTTE to target Sri Lankan Air Force aircraft on several occasions. Today, these captured launch tubes are displayed at the Sri Lanka Air Force Museum.

- Finland: Known as ItO 86; former operator.
- East Germany: Received around 1988–1989, passed on to successor states.
- Hungary Last units fired during an exercise in 2011, phased out without successor.
- Islamic State
- Islamic Courts Union
- Soviet Union: Passed on to successor states.
- UNITA
- Tamil Eelam- Liberation Tigers of Tamil Eelam

=== Evaluation-only operators ===
- Poland: It was planned to implement the production of the 9K310 Igla-1E at the Mesko plant. Due to the political changes and the lack of transfer of some documentation by the Soviet side, it was decided to develop its own systems of a portable anti-aircraft missile launcher called Grom and later Piorun.

== Igla (SA-18) ==
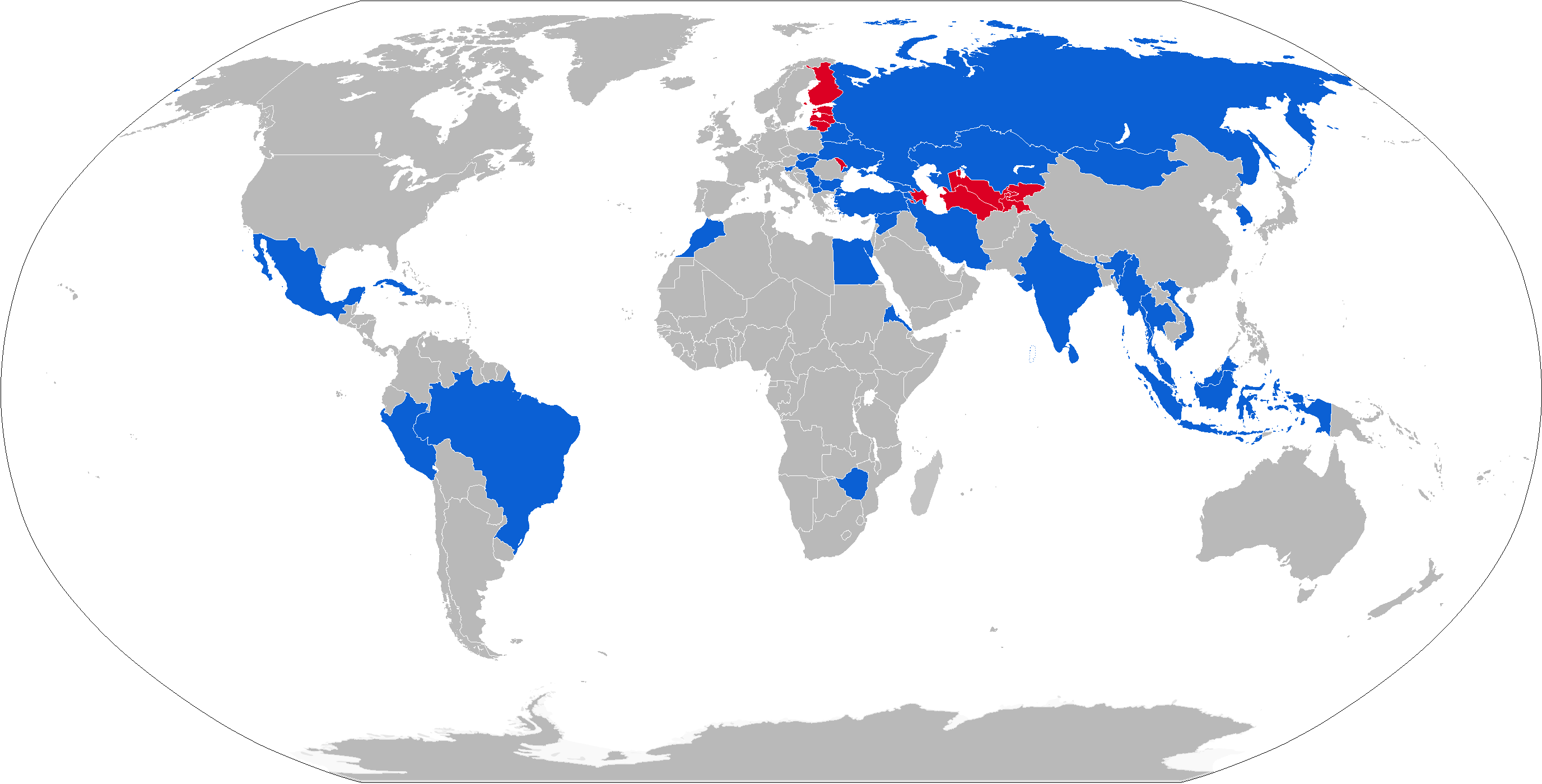
SA-18 operators Current Former

=== Current operators ===
- Armenia
- Belarus
- Brazil
- Bulgaria
- Cuba
- Ecuador
- Egypt
- Eritrea
- Georgia
- Indonesia
- India: 2,500 launchers supplied in 2001–2002
- Iran
- Jordan
- Kazakhstan
- Kurdistan Workers' Party (PKK)
- North Macedonia
- Myanmar
- Malaysia
- Mexico: 50 launchers supplied in 2002. Used by the Marines.
- Morocco
- Mongolia
- Peru
- Philippines - Presidential Security Group
- Russia: Used by Ground Forces and Airborne Forces.
- Singapore
  - Republic of Singapore Air Force
- Slovakia
- Slovenia
- Serbia
- Sri Lanka
- Syria
- Thailand
- Turkmenistan
- United Arab Emirates: Used by air defence units.
- Ukraine
- Vietnam
- Zimbabwe

=== Former operators ===
- Finland: Known as ItO-86M; former operator
- Soviet Union: Passed on to successor states
- Hizbul Islam

=== Evaluation-only operators ===
- Turkey: Bought 40 launchers for evaluation by ASELSAN SAM launch system.

== Igla-S (SA-24) ==
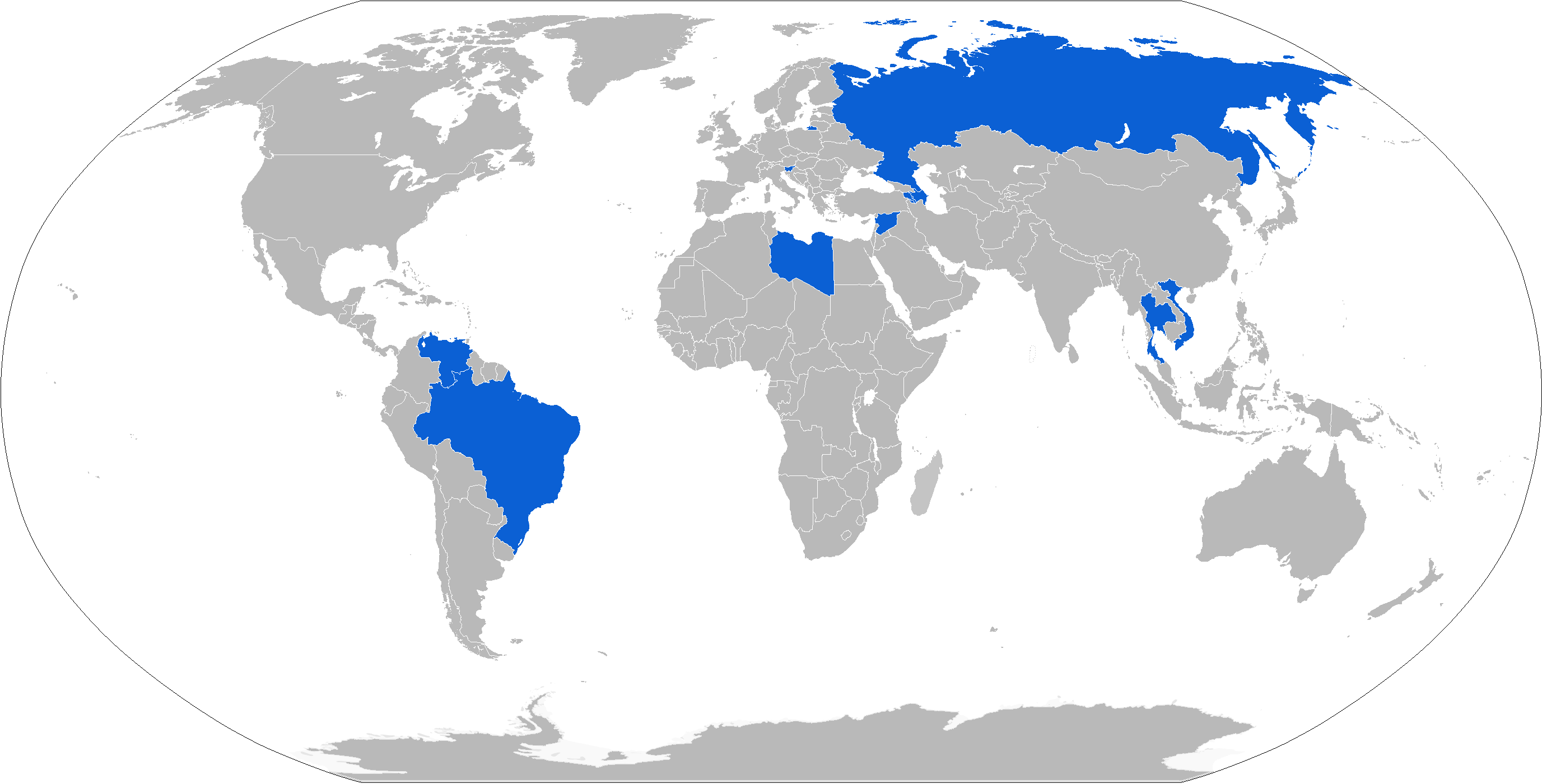
SA-24 operators Current

=== Current operators ===
- Armenia: 200 missiles. Received more as of 2018.
- Azerbaijan: 300 launchers with 1,500 missiles.
- Bahrain: Reported usage.
- Brazil
- Egypt: Reported usage.
- India: Over 48 launchers and 316 missiles.
  - First order (2021): Order for 24 missile launchers and 216 missiles placed in 2021 under Emergency Procurement. All delivered in April 2023.
  - Second order (2023): Another contract for 120 launchers and 400 missiles placed in November 2023 at a cost of ₹260 crore (US$28 million). From second batch onwards, the system is to be assembled in India by Adani Defence Systems And Technologies Limited (ADSTL) after ToT from Rosoboronexport.
    - First batch of 24 launchers and 100 missiles delivered in April 2024.
    - Second batch delivered in April 2025.
  - 2025–2026: Six contracts were signed with Adani Defence for the supply of the missiles under two tranches of Indian military's emergency procurement clause which has an upper limit of ₹300 crore (US$32 million) for each contract.
- Iran: Reported usage.
- Iraq
- Jordan
- Libya
- Myanmar
- Islamic State Sinai Province
- Qatar
- Russia: Used by ground units, marine units, and airborne units.
- Slovenia
- Sudan: Mounted on Toyota Pickups.
- Syria
- (Syria) Syrian rebels: Photo evidence of SA-24 MANPADS (man-portable) in the possession of Syrian rebels was first reported on 13 November 2012. "As far as I know, this is the first SA-24 MANPADS ever photographed outside of state control", said one expert.
- Thailand
- Venezuela More than 5,000 missiles reportedly as of October 2025.
- Vietnam: locally assembled and confirmed to be localized (named as Project KC-I), a model designated as TL-01 is suspected to be an indigenous derivative of the Igla-S.

=== Potential operators ===
Argentina: Russia offered the Igla-S to the Argentine Military as part of a bigger deal to modernize Argentina Air Defence.

=== Failed bids ===
- Finland: Newer models were offered to the Finnish Army to replace older models in service, but American FIM-92 Stinger was selected instead.

== Other uses ==
- The GLL-8 (Gll-VK) Igla is a recent Russian scramjet project conducted by TsIAM.

== See also ==
- List of Russian weaponry
- Anza – (Pakistan)
- Misagh-2 – (Iran)
- RBS 70 – (Sweden)
- Sungur – (Turkey)
- Starstreak – (United Kingdom)
- Mistral – (France)
- VSHORADS – (India)
