= USS Grouse (AMc-12) =

Minesweeper of the United States Navy

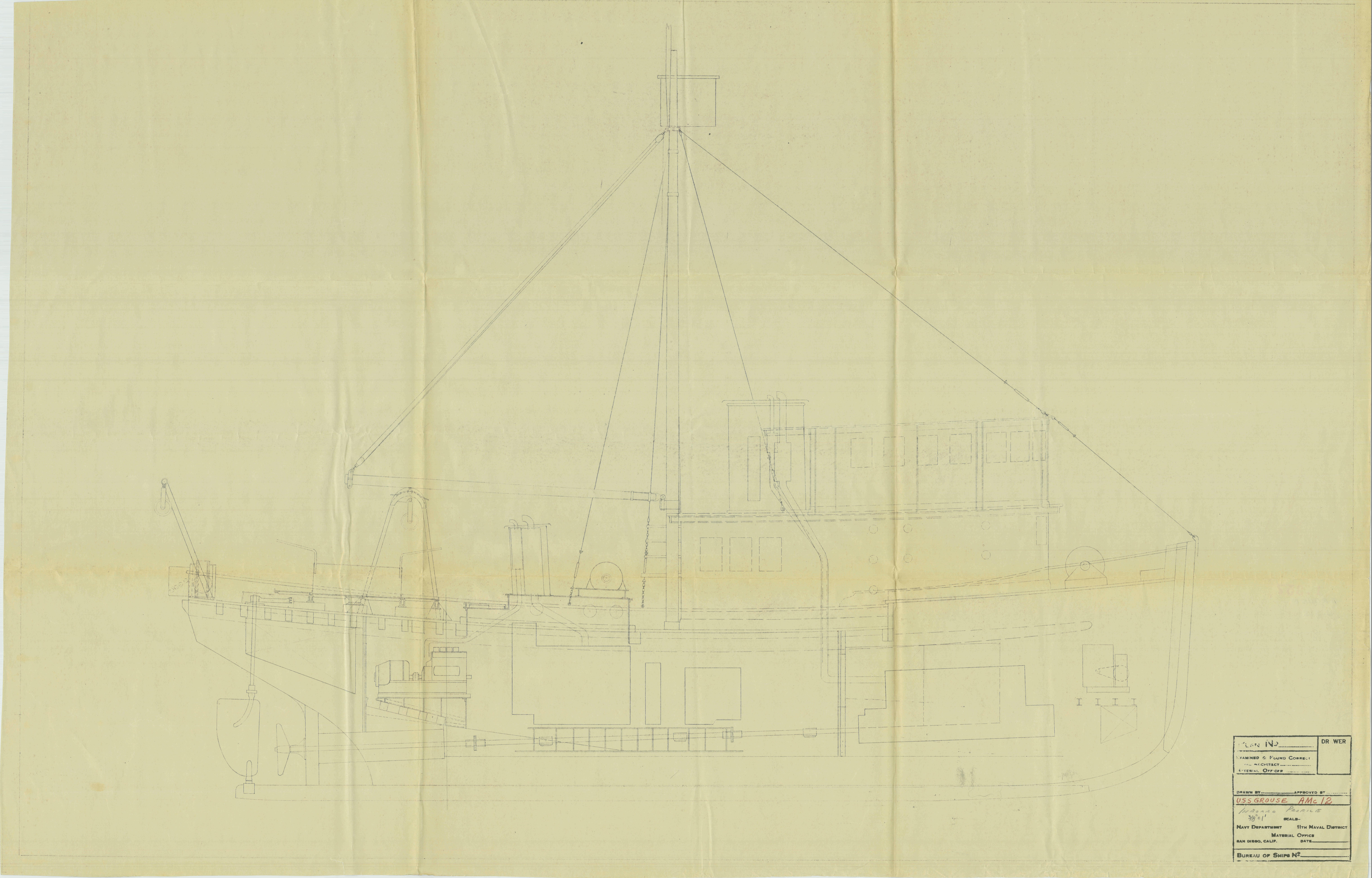
- USS Grouse inboard profile drawing

History

United States
- Name: USS Grouse
- Builder: Martinac Shipbuilding Co., Tacoma, Washington
- Launched: 1938, as New Bol
- Acquired: 1940
- Commissioned: 20 June 1941
- Decommissioned: 26 August 1944
- Stricken: 23 September 1944
- Fate: Transferred to the Maritime Commission, 5 February 1945

General characteristics
- Type: Coastal minesweeper
- Displacement: 200 long tons (203 t)
- Length: 80 ft (24 m)
- Beam: 25 ft (7.6 m)
- Speed: 11 knots (20 km/h; 13 mph)

USS Grouse (AMc-12) was a coastal minesweeper of the United States Navy. The ship, formerly the New Bol, was launched in 1938 by Martinac Shipbuilding Co., Tacoma, Washington; acquired by the Navy in 1940; and commissioned on 20 June 1941 at San Diego, California. After shakedown off San Diego, California, Grouse performed patrol and minesweeping duties in the 11th Naval District. Grouse was decommissioned on 26 August 1944. Struck from the Navy List on 23 September 1944, she was transferred to the Maritime Commission for disposal on 5 February 1945.
