= Grouse Mountain (California) =

Mountain in California, United States

- Location within California

Highest point
- Elevation: 8,586 ft (2,617 m) NAVD 88
- Prominence: 262 ft (80 m)
- Coordinates: 34°48′54″N 119°10′59″W

Geography
- Location: Kern County, California, U.S.
- Parent range: Transverse Ranges
- Topo map: USGS Sawmill Mountain

Climbing
- Easiest route: Dirt trail

Grouse Mountain is located on the border of Kern County and Ventura County a few miles south southwest of the community of Pine Mountain Club at an elevation of 8,586 feet (2,617 m). The summit is in Kern County. The mountain is in the Chumash Wilderness which is administered by the Los Padres National Forest.
