= John Peters (RAF officer) =

British Royal Air Force officer and Gulf War prisoner of war (born 1961)

- Born: 1961 (age 64–65)
- Alma mater: University of Manchester Institute of Science and Technology; University of Leicester
- Military career
- Allegiance: United Kingdom
- Branch: Royal Air Force
- Rank: Squadron Leader
- Unit: No. 15 Squadron
- Known for: Being shot down and captured during the Gulf War
- Conflicts: Gulf War

Squadron Leader John Peters (born 1961) is a British former Royal Air Force officer and pilot. He came to public prominence during the Gulf War after his Panavia Tornado GR.1 was shot down over Iraq on 17 January 1991 and he and his navigator, John Nichol, were taken prisoner.

== Early life and education ==
Peters learnt to fly while young and had obtained his pilot's licence by the age of 17. He attended the University of Manchester Institute of Science and Technology (UMIST), graduating with a BSc in Building Technology in 1983. He was an RAF university cadet, joining the RAF in 1980 and training at RAF Woodvale with the Manchester and Salford Universities Air Squadron.

== Royal Air Force career ==
After training, Peters served at RAF Chivenor, RAF Lossiemouth and RAF Laarbruch. In 1987 he became a staff pilot at the Air Navigation School of No. 6 Flying Training School at RAF Finningley. In 1988 he joined XV Squadron at RAF Laarbruch after converting to the Panavia Tornado GR1 as a Flight Lieutenant.

=== Gulf War ===
During Operation Desert Storm, Peters flew on an ultra-low-level daylight attack on Ar Rumaylah Southwest Air Base in southern Iraq. On 17 January 1991, while flying as number two to Squadron Leader Paul "Pablo" Mason, his Tornado GR.1 was hit by a shoulder-launched surface-to-air missile and forced down. Peters and his navigator, John Nichol, ejected and were captured by Iraqi forces.

Four days after their capture, Peters and Nichol were shown on Iraqi television with visible injuries, in what the Imperial War Museums describes as an Iraqi propaganda exercise that provoked international outrage over the treatment of prisoners. Peters later recalled that his battered appearance was reproduced across television and newspaper coverage worldwide. He also received around 25,000 letters from well-wishers after the broadcasts.

Peters and Nichol were held in Iraq for seven weeks and released on 5 March 1991. Peters subsequently returned to RAF service.

=== Later RAF service ===
After service at RAF Brüggen, Peters moved to RAF Cottesmore in 1993 and became an instructor with the Tri-National Tornado Training Establishment. He later completed an MBA at the University of Leicester Management Centre, where his dissertation was titled The Challenge of Change in the Royal Air Force.

He was promoted to Squadron Leader in 1997 and later served in Turkey before leaving the RAF.

== Later career ==
Following repatriation by the Red Cross, Peters and Nichol co-authored Tornado Down, an account of their wartime experience. A documentary of the same name was BAFTA-nominated and won Independent Documentary of the Year.

Peters later worked in management and leadership consultancy..

== Personal life ==
Peters is married to Helen and has two children. The family have lived in Worcestershire near Bromsgrove. While based at Cottesmore and studying at Leicester, he lived in Rutland.
