= John Nichol (RAF officer) =

Royal Air Force navigator

Adrian John Nichol
- Born: North Shields, England
- Military career
- Allegiance: United Kingdom
- Branch: Royal Air Force
- Service years: 1981–1996
- Rank: Flight lieutenant
- Conflicts: Gulf War
- Other work: Writer

Adrian "John" Nichol is a retired Royal Air Force navigator who was shot down and captured during the Gulf War.

== Early life ==
Adrian John Nichol was born in North Shields. He was the youngest of four children, and attended St Joseph's RC Primary School in Chirton, north of the Tyne Tunnel. He went to secondary school at St Cuthbert's RC Grammar School in Newcastle upon Tyne.

He gained seven O-levels, but his results weren't good enough to apply for a Royal Air Force (RAF) apprenticeship. He eventually joined the RAF in February 1981 as an electronics technician, having worked in a DIY store since leaving school.

He lived on Oswin Terrace in North Shields. He had a sister and two brothers. His brother Paul was also in the RAF.

== RAF career ==
A normal apprenticeship would be three years. Nicol was a 'direct entry technician' and completed 18 months at the No. 1 Radio School at RAF Locking. After the apprenticeship, he was earning £15,000 in 1982. He then went to RAF Brize Norton as a Junior Technician.

In 1986, approaching the age of 23, he applied to become an officer and was chosen for the four-month officer training course. From there, he spent three years learning how to fly and operate aircraft.

Nichol was commissioned as a navigator in December 1986. He served with XV Squadron based at RAF Laarbruch, Germany. During Operation Granby in the Gulf War, the squadron was deployed to Muharraq Airfield in Bahrain. Nichol's first mission, on 17 January 1991, entailed flying as number two to Squadron Leader Paul "Pablo" Mason on an ultra-low-level sortie against Ar Ruma airfield. During the flight, his Panavia Tornado GR1 ZD791 was critically damaged by a shoulder-launched SA-16 surface-to-air missile, and Nichol and his pilot, John Peters, were captured by Iraqi forces. After capture, Nichol was shown, bruised, on Iraqi television. He was tortured in the Abu Ghraib prison. Nichol was released by the Iraqis at the end of the Gulf War.

Nichol remained in the RAF until March 1996. After repatriation by the Red Cross, Nichol co-authored a book, Tornado Down, with John Peters, about his experience.

== Author and broadcaster ==
Since Tornado Down, Nichol has written eighteen books including five novels: Point of Impact, Vanishing Point, Exclusion Zone, Stinger and Decisive Measures. His books provide accounts of Second World War history and include The Last Escape, which tells the story of Allied prisoners of war in the closing stages of the war; Tail-End Charlies, about the final battles of the Allied bomber campaign in the Second World War; and Home Run which recounts the experiences of escaped Allied prisoners of war evading capture in Europe behind enemy lines. Medic: Saving Lives – from Dunkirk to Afghanistan (2009) was short-listed for the 2010 Wellcome Trust Book Prize.

== Personal life ==
Nichol lives in Hertfordshire, with his wife Suzannah and daughter.
