= RAF Marham =

Royal Air Force main operating base in Norfolk, England

RAF Marham
- Near King's Lynn, Norfolk in England, UK
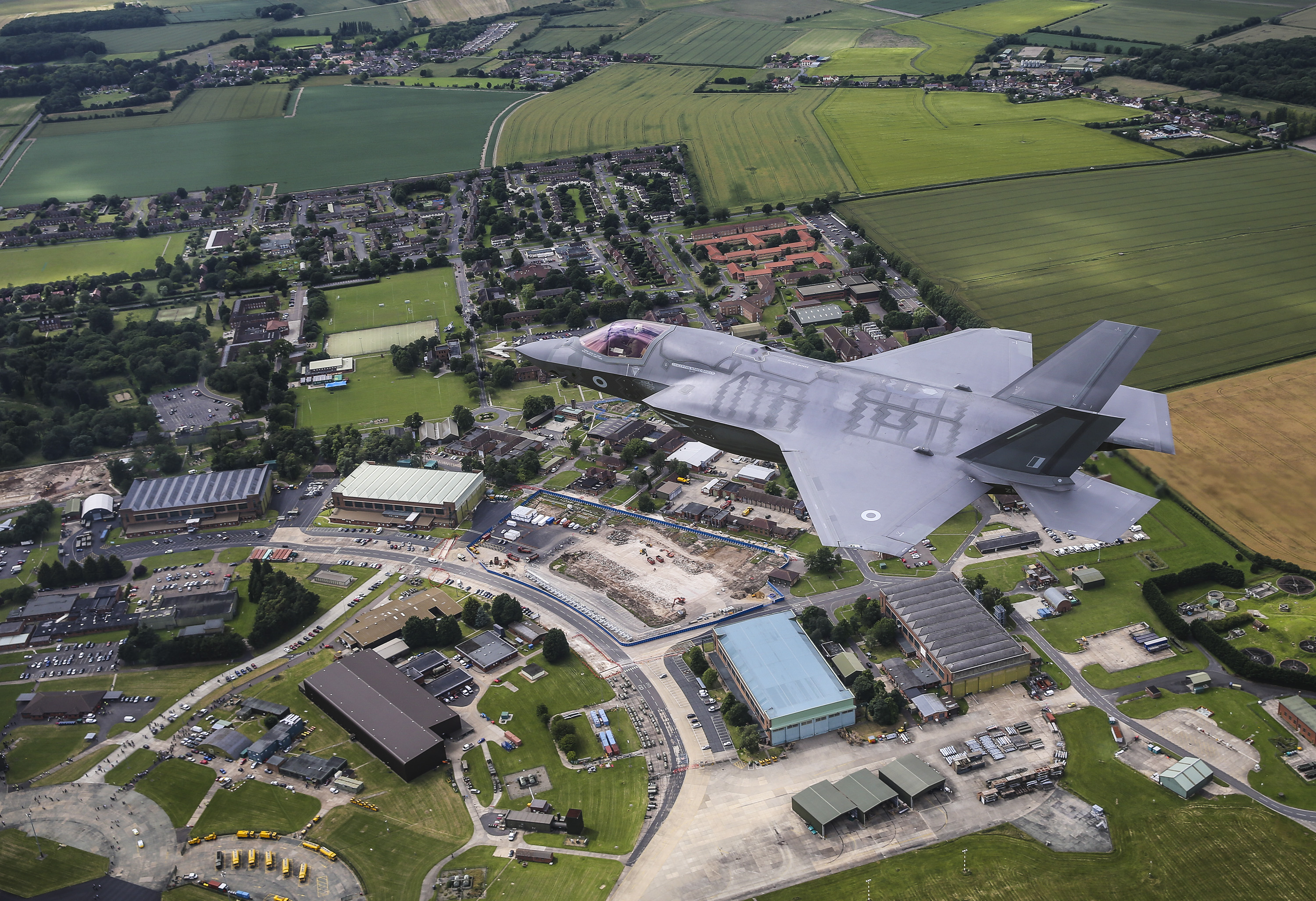
- A Lockheed Martin F-35B Lightning flies over RAF Marham, 2016

- Deter

Site information
- Type: Main operating base
- Owner: Ministry of Defence
- Operator: Royal Air Force
- Controlled by: No. 2 Group (Air Combat Support Group)
- Condition: operational
- Website: Official website

Location
- Shown within Norfolk
- Coordinates: 52°38′54″N 000°33′02″E
- Grid reference: TL730685
- Area: 667 hectares (1,650 acres)

Site history
- Built: 1916; 110 years ago
- In use: 1916–1919; 1937–present

Garrison information
- Current commander: Group Captain Leonie Boyd
- Occupants: No. 207 Squadron; No. 617 (Dambusters) Squadron; 809 Naval Air Squadron; See Based units section for full list.

Airfield information
- Identifiers: IATA: KNF, ICAO: EGYM, WMO: 03482
- Elevation: 76 feet (23 m) AMSL
Runways
Direction	Length and surface
06/24	2,783 metres (9,131 ft) asphalt/concrete
01/19	1,864 metres (6,115 ft) asphalt/concrete
- Other airfield facilities: 3x V/STOL pads
- Source: UK Military AIP

RAF Marham (IATA: KNF, ICAO: EGYM) is a Royal Air Force station near the village of Marham in the county of Norfolk, East Anglia, south of King's Lynn and Boston, and west of Norwich.

It is home to No. 138 Expeditionary Air Wing (138 EAW) and, as such, is one of the RAF's 'main operating bases' (MOB). Since 6 June 2018, it has been home to the fifth generation Lockheed Martin F-35B Lightning operated by No. 617 (Dambusters) Squadron. No. 207 Squadron, becoming the second Lightning squadron to be based at RAF Marham when it reformed on 1 August 2019 as the F-35 operational conversion unit (OCU).

== History ==
=== Beginnings (1916–1919) ===
Opened in August 1916 close to the former Royal Naval Air Station Narborough, later RAF Narborough, the Marham base was originally a military night landing ground on an 80-acre (320,000-square-metre) site within the boundary of the present day RAF Marham. In 1916, the aerodrome was handed over to the Royal Flying Corps (RFC). Throughout the First World War, Marham's role was focused on defending Norfolk from Zeppelin raids. No. 51 Squadron became the first RFC unit to be stationed at Marham upon their move in September 1916, flying home defence missions. On the night of 27/28 November 1916, Lt. Gaymer of No. 51 Squadron took off from Marham to intercept Zeppelin L21. However, he crashed his Royal Aircraft Factory F.E.2b and was killed after making no contact. L21 was later shot down near Lowestoft by Royal Naval Air Service crews.

Outside of home defence, Marham also acted as a training base for night time flying, with this provided by No. 51 Squadron. No. 191 (Night) Training Squadron was formed at Marham on 6 November 1917 to provide training for night time operations, who were based at Marham until moving to Upwood in January 1918. No. 51 Squadron also assisted No. 190 Training Squadron and No. 193 Training Squadron, who were based nearby, throughout late 1917 and 1918. To celebrate the Armistice on 11 November 1918, aircraft from Marham bombed Narborough with bags of flour who in return bombed Marham with bags of soot. No. 51 Squadron departed Marham in May 1919 for Sutton's Farm, with the aerodrome closing shortly after.

=== Rearmament (1935–1945) ===
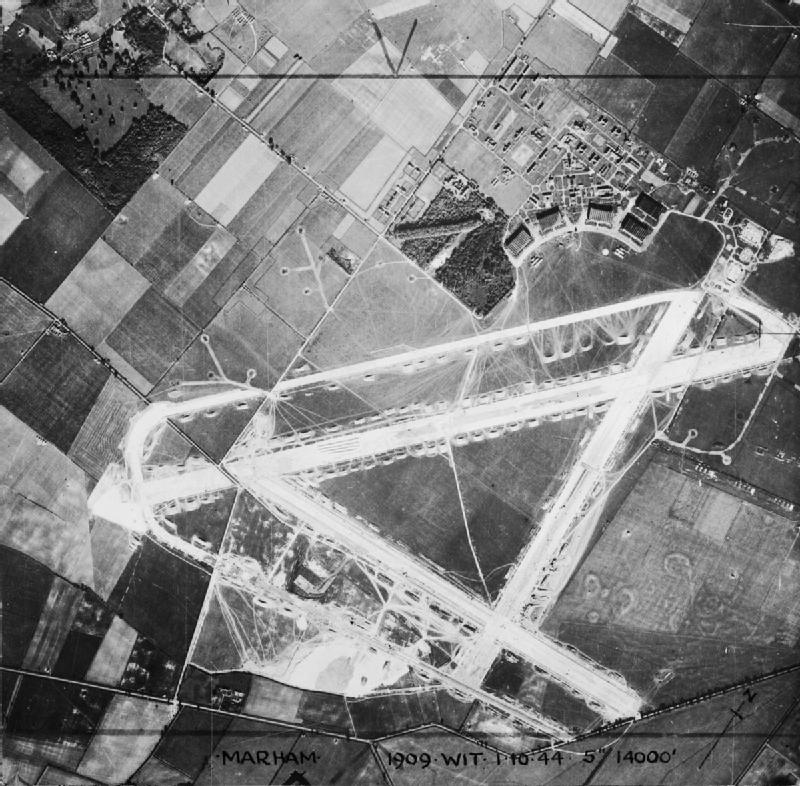
The new concrete runways viewed in 1944.

In the first half of 1935, work started on a new airfield which became active on 1 April 1937; 89 years ago, with a resident heavy bomber unit from within No. 3 Group, RAF Bomber Command.

The first squadron, No. 38, arrived on 5 May 1937 with Fairey Hendon bombers. In June, No. 115 Squadron re-formed at Marham with the Handley Page Harrow, initially sharing No. 38 Squadron's Hendons until Harrow deliveries were completed in August. No. 38 Squadron received Vickers Wellington Mk.I bombers in December 1938, followed in April 1939 by No. 115 Squadron. No. 218 Squadron moved to Marham on 27 Nov 1940, also operating Wellingtons. No. 218 Squadron began conversion to the Short Stirling in December 1941, and used the type on operations from 1942. De Havilland Mosquitos from No. 105 Squadron also arrived in 1941. Marham became part of the Pathfinder force. They also tested and proved the Oboe precision bombing aid.

On 30 January 1943, three Mosquitos from RAF Marham deliberately attacked the headquarters of the German state broadcasting company just as Hermann Göring, head of the German air force, and himself a World War I fighter pilot, began to speak. The sounds of aircraft engines and anti-aircraft guns could be heard before broadcast engineers cut Göring off and switched to classical music. All three Mosquitos returned safely to Marham.

During March 1944, RAF Marham closed for the construction of new concrete runways, perimeter track, and dispersal areas, marking the end of its wartime operations. The three new runways were of the familiar wartime triangular pattern of class A airfield, but Marham was one of only two sites built as a heavy bomber airfield (the other was nearby RAF Sculthorpe) with the runways substantially longer than the standard layout.

=== Cold War (1946–1982) ===
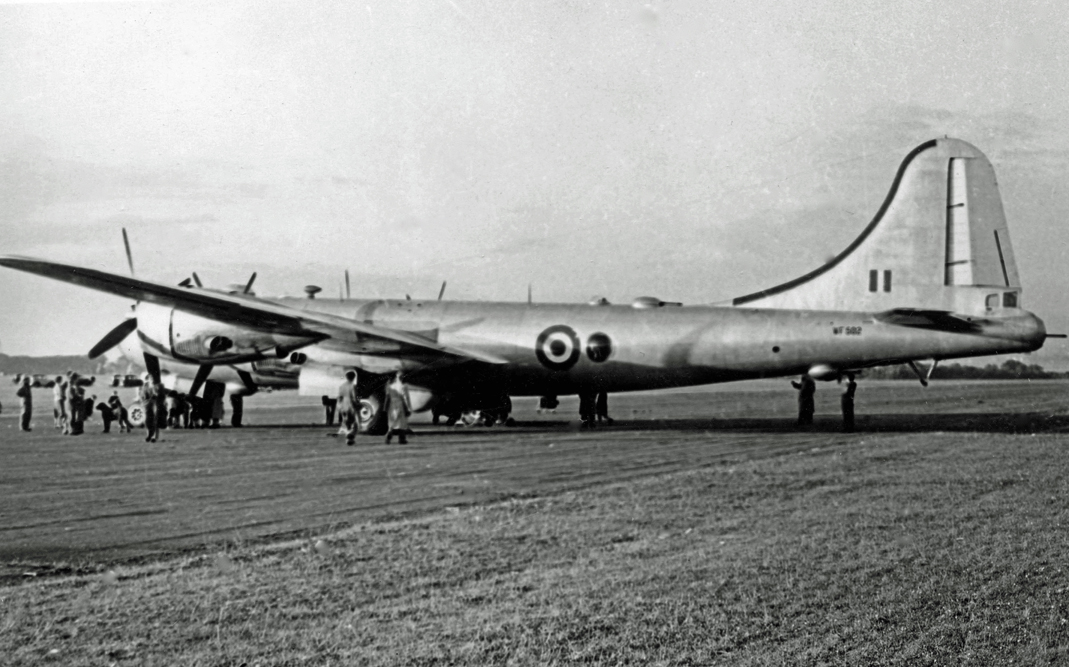
Boeing Washington B1, No. 90 Squadron, 1952 (based at Marham between 1950 and 1956)

From 15 March to 31 October 1946, RAF Marham hosted seven B-17 Flying Fortressess and three modified B-29 Super Fortressess of the United States Army Air Forces (USAAF) during Project 'Ruby', which was a series of trials to test the effectiveness of deep penetration bombs such as the Grand Slam and Disney against "massive reinforced concrete targets". Trials began on 25 March, and were undertaken by the USAAF B-29s and modified Lancasters of No. XV Squadron by attacking the Nordsee III U-boat pen at Heligoland and the U-boat assembly plant at Farge, Germany. Project 'Ruby' ended on 31 October after 22 trials had been completed, with results concluding that none of the bombs tested were capable of penetrating massive reinforced concrete. Nine B-29s of the 340th Bombardment Squadron arrived at Marham on 9 June 1947 as part of a 'goodwill' visit to the United Kingdom. Between March 1948 and March 1950, USAF B-29s and B-50s of the 2nd; 22nd; 43rd; 307th and 509th Bombardment Groups spent time based at Marham.

On 22 March 1950, the first four of an eventual 70 Boeing Washington B.1s arrived at Marham. The aircraft were handed over in a ceremony attended by Secretary of State for Air Arthur Henderson, Air Officer Commanding-in-Chief Bomber Command Air Marshal Hugh Pughe Lloyd, and Major General Leon W. Johnson, Commander of the USAF 3rd Air Division.

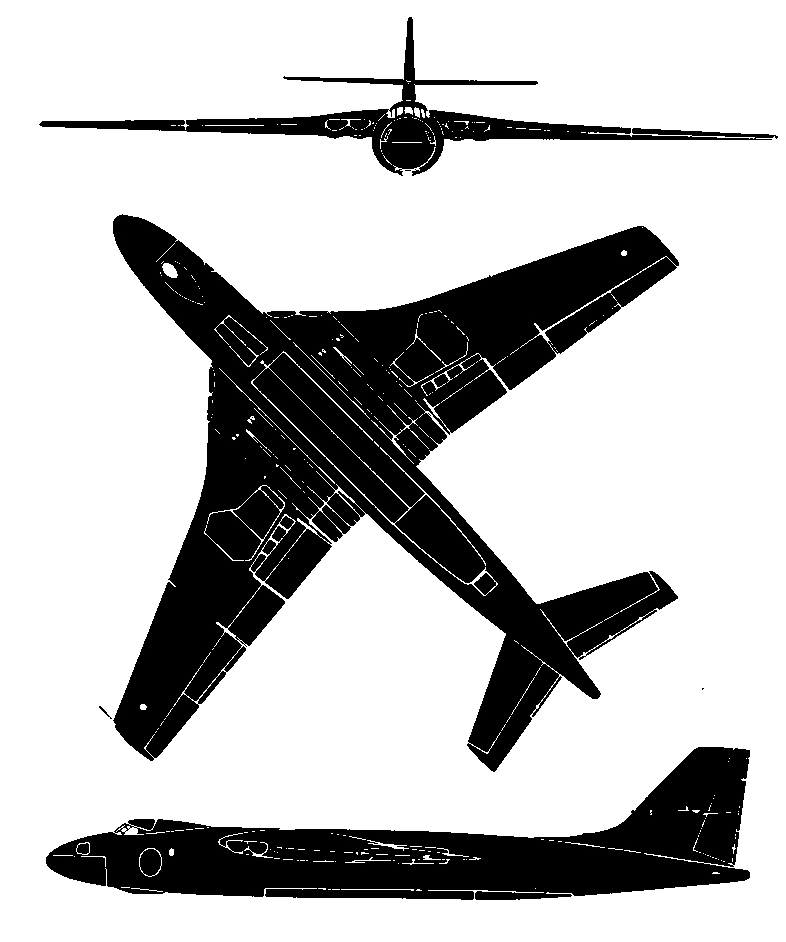
Silhouette of the Valiant B.1

The airfield main runway was large enough for the operation of United States Air Force Boeing B-52 Stratofortress, and a number of these aircraft visited on exercises in the 1970s and 1980s.

Squadrons based at RAF Marham at that time included No. 148 Squadron (re-formed with Valiants at RAF Marham 1 July 1956 and disbanded 1 May 1965), No. 207 Squadron (re-formed with Valiants at RAF Marham on 1 April 1956 and disbanded on 1 May 1965) and No. 214 Squadron (re-formed with Valiants at RAF Marham on 21 January 1956 and disbanded on 1 March 1965).

=== Tornado GR (1982–2019) ===
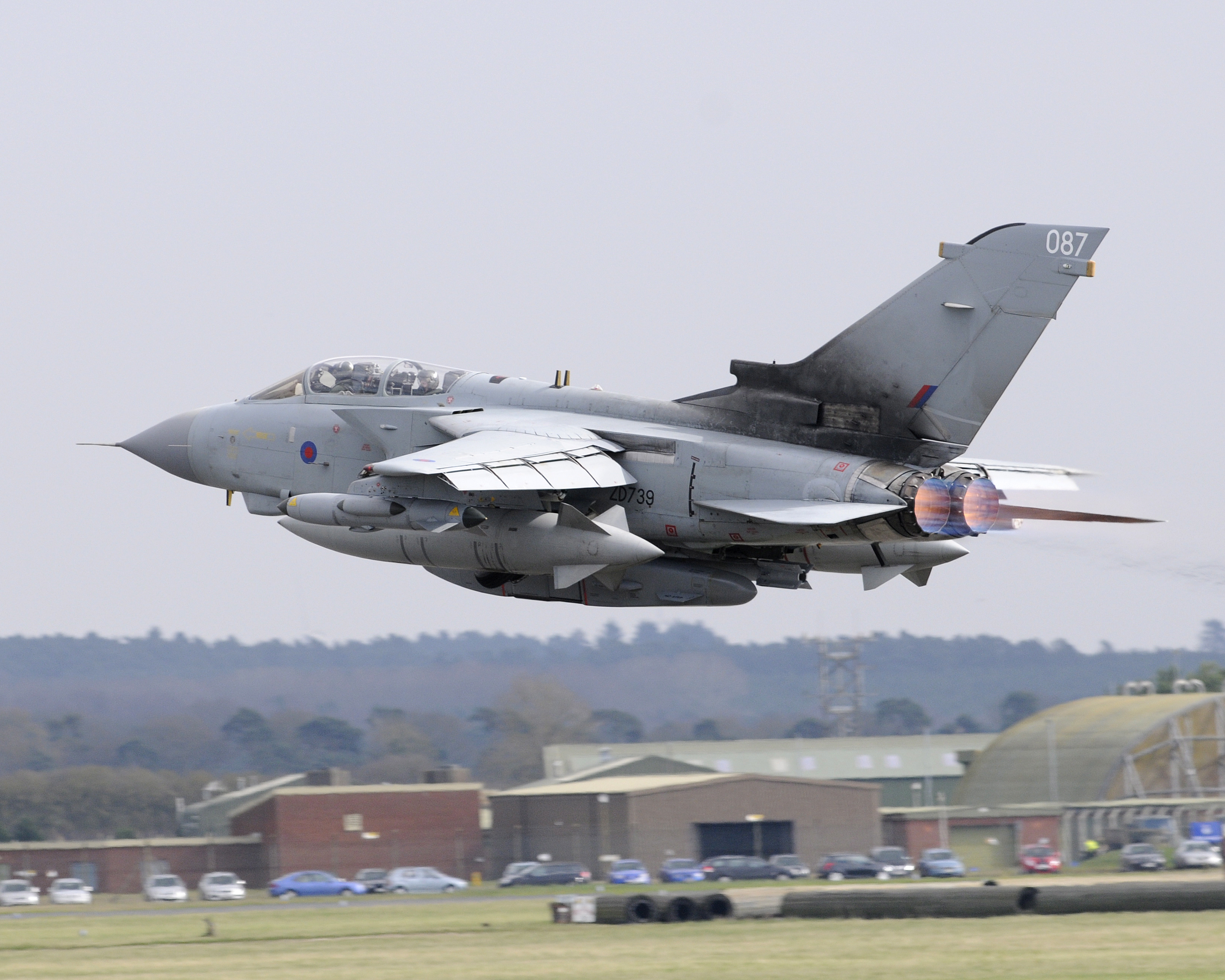
Panavia Tornado GR4 taking off from RAF Marham during Operation Ellamy, 2011

During 1980–83, twenty-four hardened aircraft shelters (HAS) were constructed to house future strike aircraft, which would eventually see the arrival of the Panavia Tornado GR1 in 1982. These shelters were also equipped with the US Weapon Storage Security System (WS3), each able to store four WE.177 nuclear bombs. The first Tornado GR1 to be delivered to Marham was ZA601 on 24 April 1982 from BAe Warton, in preparation for the reformation of No. 617 (Dambusters) Squadron which stood up on 1 January 1983. This was shortly followed by No. 27 Squadron which reformed at Marham on 12 August.

No. 57 Squadron disbanded at RAF Marham on 30 June 1986, leaving No. 55 Squadron as the last Victor K2 unit at the base. In March 1987, the Tornado Weapons Conversion Unit (TWCU) relocated its Tornados from RAF Honington to Marham for a period of six months while runway repairs were carried out. In March 1988, Hawker Siddeley Nimrod MR2s of No. 42 Squadron spent a year based at Marham while RAF St. Mawgan had its runway repaired. No. II (Army Co-operation) Squadron relocated from RAF Laarbruch, Germany to Marham in December 1991, bringing with it the Tornado GR1A and its 'Tornado Infra-Red Reconnaissance System' (TIRRS).

No. 27 Squadron disbanded in September 1993, with its aircraft and crew transferring to No. 12 (Bomber) Squadron who moved to RAF Lossiemouth in January 1994. No. 55 Squadron, the last of the RAF Victor squadrons, disbanded at Marham in October 1993, with the last Victor to leave departing in November. In December, No. 39 (1 Photographic Reconnaissance Unit) Squadron arrived at RAF Marham with its Canberra PR7s and PR9s from RAF Wyton.

Following the 1998 Strategic Defence Review, it was decided to end the Royal Air Force's presence in Germany, No. IX (B) Squadron relocated from RAF Brüggen to RAF Marham on 17 July 2001, followed shortly by No. 31 Squadron on 17 August, who landed their Tornados at Marham at precisely 13:31 hrs BST.

With the assistance of the then Duke of York (now Andrew Mountbatten-Windsor), the airbase facilitated private flights for the financier and sex offender Jeffrey Epstein in 2000.

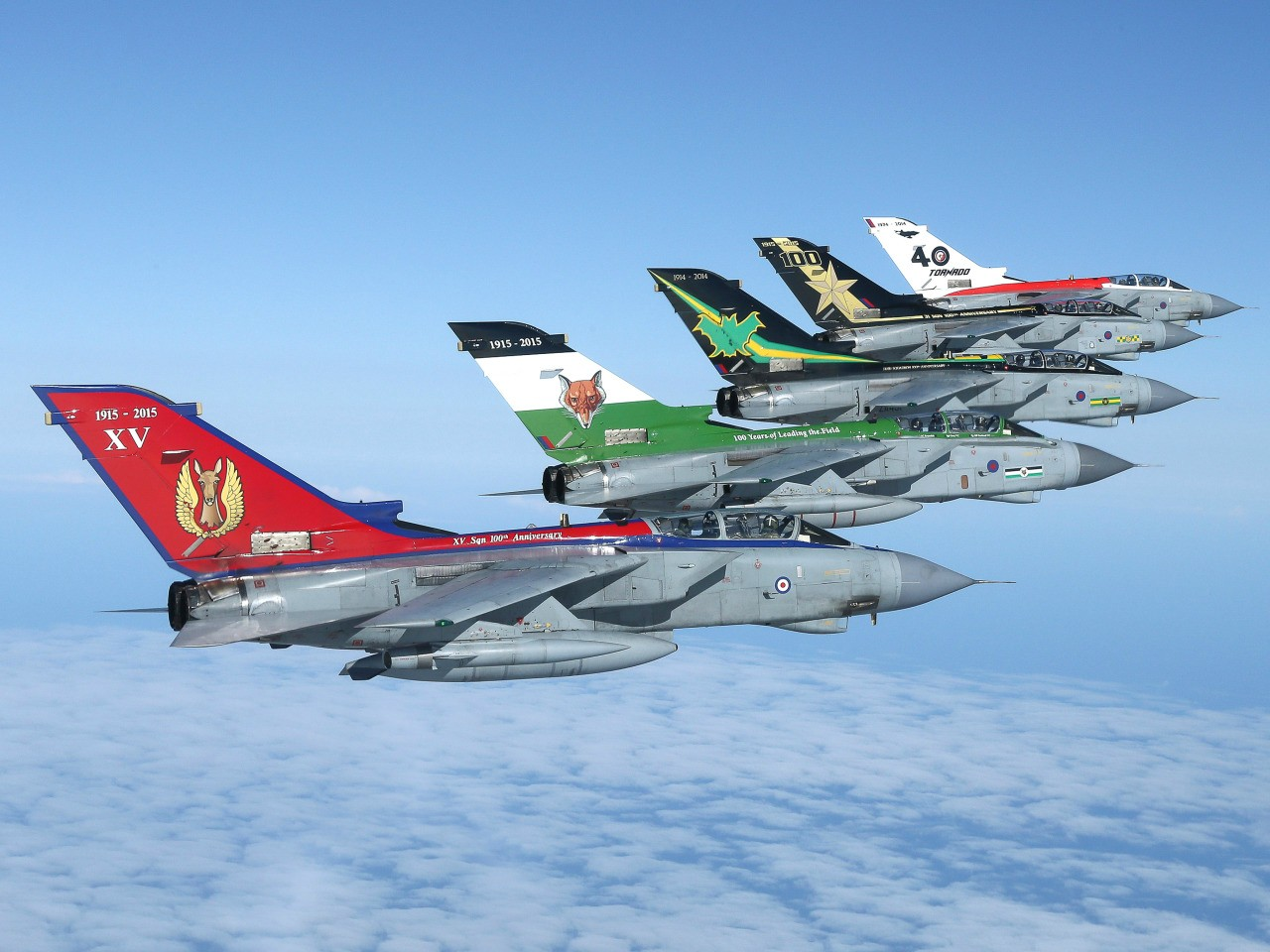
Panavia Tornado GR4s in liveries to mark 100th anniversaries of Nos. IX(B), 12(B), XV(R) and 31 Squadrons as well as 40 years of Tornado, 2015. (Nos. IX(B), 12(B) and 31 were all based at Marham with the Tornado.)

No. 39 (1 PRU) Squadron disbanded on 31 July 2006, ending 52 years of Canberra operations at Marham. Following the closure of RAF Coltishall in November 2006, RAF Marham was officially granted the Freedom of the City of Norwich in 2008 and, as such, is allowed to march through the streets of Norwich with 'bayonets fixed'; this is usually carried out on occasions such as the annual Battle of Britain parade held on 12 September every year.

On the night of 19/20 March 2011, No. IX (B) Squadron Tornado GR4s flew a 3,000 miles (2,600 nautical miles; 4,800 kilometres) round trip from Marham to carry out Storm Shadow strikes against targets in Libya as part of Operation Ellamy. Following the 2010 Strategic Defence and Security Review, No. XIII Squadron was disbanded on 13 May 2011, followed by No. 14 Squadron on 1 June.

On 26 September 2014, Tornado aircraft began airstrikes against ISIL as part of Operation Shader. In 2015, four Tornados (ZA405, ZA456, ZA548, and ZD788) from RAF Marham received special markings to mark the 100th anniversaries of Nos. IX (B), 12 (B) and 31 Squadrons, as well as the 40th anniversary of Tornado service.

As part of the draw-down of the RAF's Tornado GR4 fleet, No. 12 (B) Squadron disbanded on 14 February 2018. Squadron personnel were reassigned to Marham's other Tornado squadrons, No. IX (B) Squadron and No. 31 Squadron.

The last eight deployed Tornado GR4s returned home to RAF Marham from RAF Akrotiri, Cyprus, on 4 and 5 February 2019. To mark the nearing Tornado retirement, RAF Marham held a series of 'farewell flypasts' across the United Kingdom on 19, 20 and 21 February. On 28 February, nine Tornado GR4s flew from RAF Marham for a diamond nine formation flypast over RAF Cranwell, which was holding a graduation parade, before returning to Marham to carry out several passes over the airbase. RAF Marham saw the final flight of an RAF Tornado (ZA463) on 14 March during the disbandment parade of No. IX (B) Squadron and No. 31 Squadron. The Tornado GR4 was completely retired from service on 1 April 2019, leaving the F-35 Lightning as the sole type based at RAF Marham.

=== Project Anvil (2016–2018) ===
Project Anvil was the £250 million programme of investment to provide Marham with new and upgraded infrastructure for F-35B Lightning operations. The enabling works, worth £25 million, were undertaken by Balfour Beatty and Henry Brothers, with work commencing in May 2016. These works involved demolition of hangar no.3 located on the north side of the airfield. The hangar dated from the 1930s, and was last used for Tornado depth engineering. In its place, the new Lightning Maintenance and Finish Facility was completed.

In late 2016, Wates Group was awarded a £27 million contract to construct a new squadron building for No. 617 (Dambusters) Squadron in the south west hardened aircraft shelters area. Construction began in March 2017, and was completed in spring 2018.

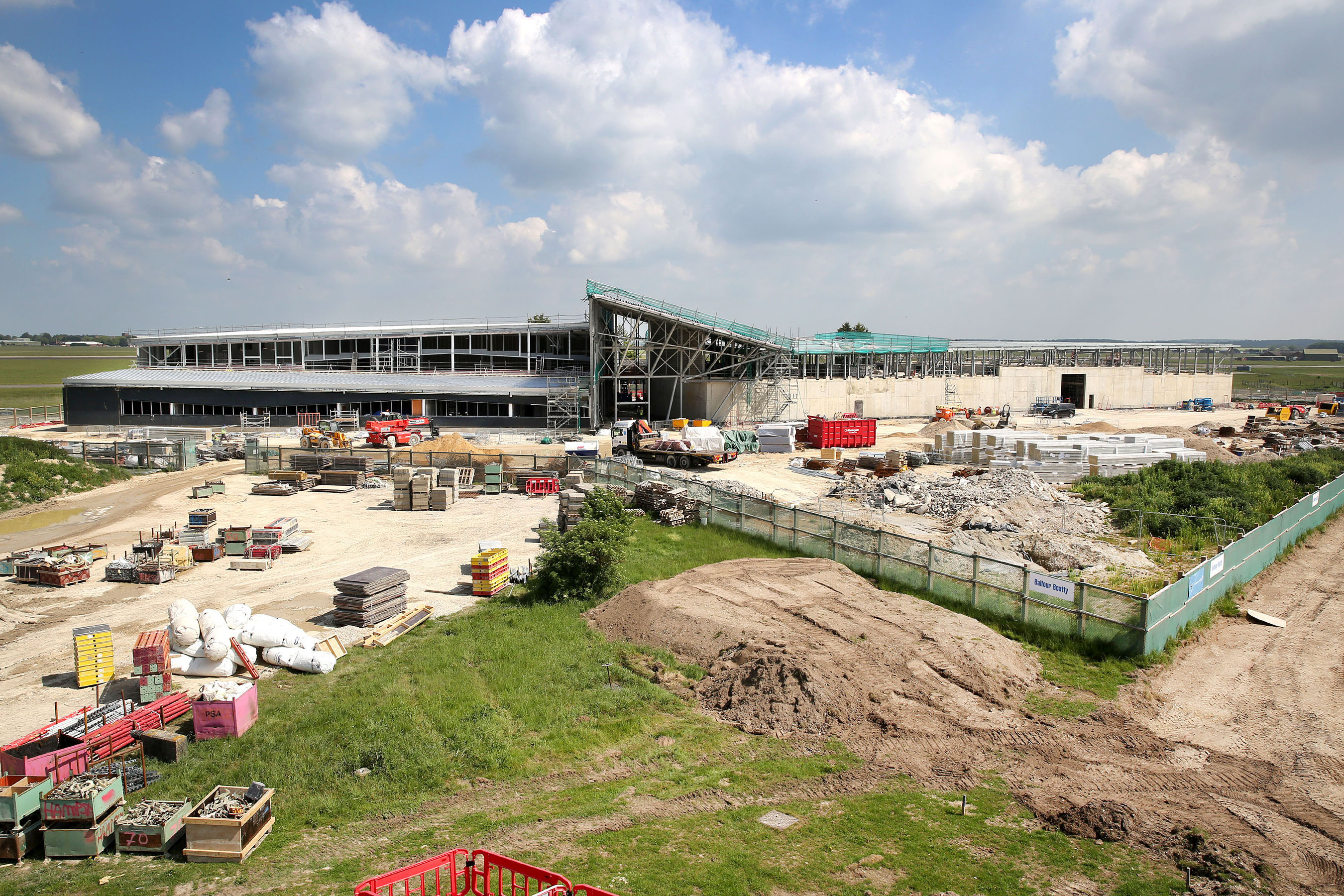
The Lightning Integrated Training Centre under construction during 2017.

The Lightning National Operating Centre (NOC) was constructed on the north-west side of the airfield, near the station golf course. The NOC was designed to accommodate around 125 personnel who form the Lightning Force Headquarters and Logistics Operating Centre. The NOC, the first Project Anvil building to be completed, was opened by the Queen, the station's Honorary Air Commodore, on 2 February 2018. In April 2016, Balfour Beatty were awarded a contract worth £82.5 million to construct a joint Lockheed Martin / BAE Systems Lightning European Maintenance Hub. The hub comprised an Integrated Training Centre (ITC), a Logistics Operations Centre, and a Maintenance and Finishing Facility (M&F) across three separate sites at Marham. The ITC was built on the south side of the airfield, and was designed to provide maintainer training and accommodate the Lightning Full Mission Simulators.

The final construction contracts, worth £135 million, were awarded to Galliford Try and Lagan Construction in June 2017. The work included construction of a new hangar to replace hangar no.1, rebuilding of Marham's runways, installation of vertical landing pads, new taxiways, and refurbishment of 90% of existing taxiways and airfield operating surfaces. Both runways were rebuilt during a three-week period (8–28 September 2017), which saw all flying cease and the laying of more than 18,000 tonnes of new asphalt. The resurfacing works were completed by June 2018. Project Anvil also included construction of servicing platforms and refurbishment of hardened aircraft shelters. Facilities for the operational conversion unit (OCU) were built between the No. 617 Squadron hardened aircraft shelters and the Integrated Training Centre.

=== F-35B Lightning (2018–) ===
The Ministry of Defence (MOD) announced in March 2013 that the entire British fleet of Lockheed Martin F-35B Lightning aircraft, which would be operated jointly by the Royal Air Force and Royal Navy's Fleet Air Arm, would be based at RAF Marham. The Lightning is a fifth-generation short take-off and vertical landing (STOVL) multi-role combat aircraft designed to operate from the Royal Navy's Queen Elizabeth-class aircraft carriers.

The first aircraft arrived at Marham on 6 June 2018, when four F-35Bs of No. 617 (Dambusters) Squadron, supported by three Voyagers and an Atlas, made an eight-hour transit flight across the Atlantic from Marine Corps Air Station Beaufort in South Carolina. The RAF announced on 5 July 2017 that No. 207 Squadron will be the operational conversion unit (OCU) for the F-35 Lightning. No. 617 (Dambusters) Squadron, became the first operational unit on 11 January 2019. Six F-35Bs of No. 207 Squadron arrived at RAF Marham from Marine Corps Air Station Beaufort on 16 July 2019, before the squadron officially reformed on 1 August 2019.

In late January 2020, F-35Bs from No. 207 Squadron departed for HMS Queen Elizabeth, becoming the first British squadron in a decade to operate jet aircraft from a British aircraft carrier in home waters. On 3 February 2020, Queen Elizabeth II visited personnel at the base and inspected the F-35B aircraft, her first official royal engagement of the new decade.

On 3 September 2020, ten United States Marine Corps (USMC) F-35Bs from VMFA-211 arrived at RAF Marham to operate alongside the Dambusters. On 22 September, both squadrons embarked on HMS Queen Elizabeth for Exercise Joint Warrior. In late October, both units participated in Exercise Crimson Warrior, the largest UK exercise in over a decade.

A replacement kennel facility for military working dogs was opened at Marham in September 2024. The facility cost £23 million and is separated into three blocks capable of accommodating 48 dogs. It includes exercise areas; a veterinary block with isolation kennels; and facilities for the RAF Police.

== Future ==
In June 2025, the MOD announced plans to procure twelve Lockheed Martin F-35A Lightning aircraft, capable of carrying both conventional and nuclear weapons, including the B61-12 thermonuclear gravity bomb. The aircraft will form part of NATO's dual capable aircraft programme. The F-35A is expected to be based at RAF Marham. They will also be used in a training role for routine operations, as part of the No. 207 Squadron (OCU).

== Links to Jeffrey Epstein ==
In 2011, The Daily Telegraph reported that financier and child sex offender Jeffrey Epstein's private jet had landed at RAF Marham on 7 December 2000, on a short repositioning flight from Luton Airport. In 2026, the Epstein files indicated that the flight may have been used for human trafficking purposes. The Times further reported that corroborating flight logs had been deleted. It has been alleged that Andrew Mountbatten-Windsor, the former Duke of York "pulled strings" so that Epstein could utilise the air base. It is further claimed that Epstein travelled to the royal residence of Sandringham House the same day.

== Role and operations ==
=== Command ===
Group Captain Phil Marr was appointed as RAF Marham station commander in July 2021. The station is close to the Royal Estate of Sandringham, and Queen Elizabeth II was the station's Honorary Air Commodore. The late Queen made a number of visits to the station, most recently on 3 February 2020. RAF Marham was under the command of No. 1 Group (Air Combat) RAF.

The airfield moved from No. 1 Group (Air Combat) to No. 2 Group (Air Combat Support Group) on 28 April 2023, becoming the lead station for the East Region, the site is also twinned with HMNB Portsmouth.

=== F-35B Lightning operations ===
RAF Marham is home to No. 617 (Dambusters) Squadron, a front line squadron operating the F-35B Lightning, along with No. 207 Squadron; the F-35B operational conversion unit (OCU).

=== Expeditionary Air Wing ===
No. 138 Expeditionary Air Wing (No. 138 EAW) was formed at Marham on 1 April 2006 to create and facilitate a structure for a deployable air force.

=== Supported units ===
RAF Marham is the 'parent' RAF station for:

- RAF Holbeach — bombing range;
- RRH Neatishead (formerly parented by RAF Coltishall).

== Based units ==
The following notable flying and non-flying units are based at RAF Marham:

=== Royal Air Force ===
No. 1 Group (Air Combat)

- Lightning Air Wing
  - No. 207 Squadron – F-35B Lightning
  - No. 617 Squadron – F-35B Lightning

No. 2 Group (Air Combat Support)

- Air Security Force
  - No. 2 RAF Police & Security Wing
    - No. 6 RAF Police (Lightning) Squadron Headquarters
- Combat Readiness Force
  - No. 3 RAF Force Protection Wing
    - No. 3 RAF Force Protection Wing Headquarters
    - No. 15 Squadron RAF Regiment
    - No. 2620 (County of Norfolk) Squadron (Royal Auxiliary Air Force) Regiment

=== British Army ===
Royal Engineers

- 8 Engineer Brigade
  - 12 (Force Support) Engineer Group
    - 20 Works Group (Air Support)
      - 534 Specialist Team Royal Engineers (Airfields) (STRE)

=== Royal Navy ===
Fleet Air Arm

- 809 Naval Air Squadron – F-35B Lightning

=== Civilian ===
- RAF Marham Aero Club – Cessna 150

== Heritage ==
=== Station badge and motto ===
RAF Marhams's badge, awarded in October 1957 when it was home to part of the RAF V-Force, features a blue-coloured bull with its head lowered and facing towards the viewer. The bull, an animal considered to be aggressive to intruders entering its area, represented Marham's nuclear deterrence role. For the same reason, the station's motto is Deter.

=== Gate guardians ===
Of the gate guardians at RAF Marham, in March 2020, its Panavia Tornado GR1 ZA407 was removed from the station entrance, to take up a role as fire fighting training aid. It was replaced on the gate by Tornado GR4 ZA614.

Marham has one other preserved aircraft on the station; an English Electric Canberra PR9 XH169, which has been on display within the main technical site since November 2007. Until November 2020, outside the station headquarters building was Handley Page Victor K2 XH673, which was scrapped after failing to find a new owner.

== List of station commanders ==
Station commanders include:

- September 1, 1940, Gp Cpt Victor Groom
- 1942-44, Gp Cpt Wallace Kyle
- 1952, Gp Cpt Donaldson
- 1955, Gp Cpt RC Ayling
- March 1956, Gp Cpt Lewis MacDonald Hodges DSO DFC (1918-2007)
- 1959, Gp Cpt W J Burnett
- 1967, Gp Cpt D Roberts DFC AFC
- January 17, 1972 Gp Cpt Victor McNabney GM, from Armagh
- April 1974, Gp Cpt Hugh Anthony (Tony) Caillard (1927-2022)
- 1976, Gp Cpt David Parry-Evans (1935-2020)
- 1977, Gp Cpt Brendan James Jackson (1935-98)
- July 1981, Gp Cpt Jeremy Simon Blake Price
- 1983, Gp Cpt Bob O'Brien
- November 27, 1987, Gp Capt David Henderson

== Former squadrons ==
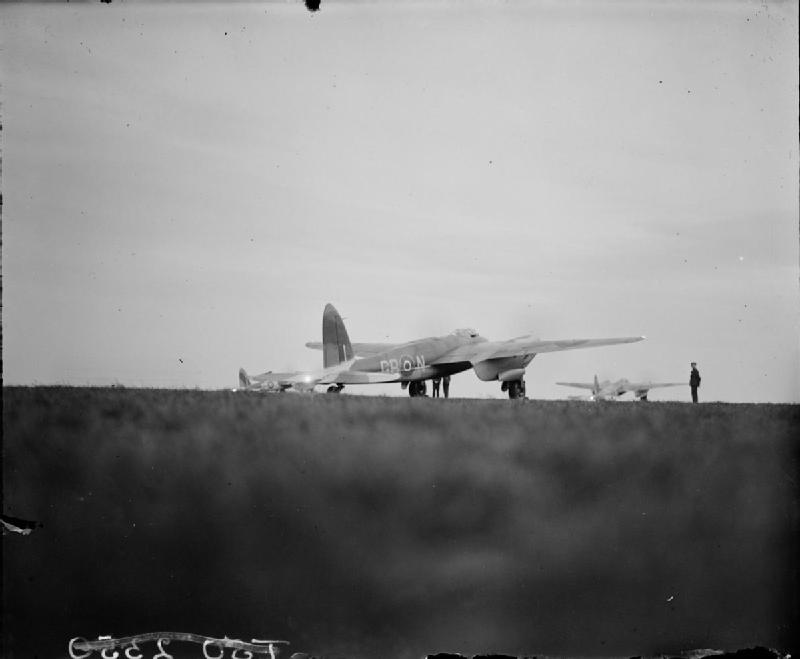
De Havilland Mosquito B.IVs of No. 105 Squadron at RAF Marham during WWII (based at Marham between 1942 and 1944)

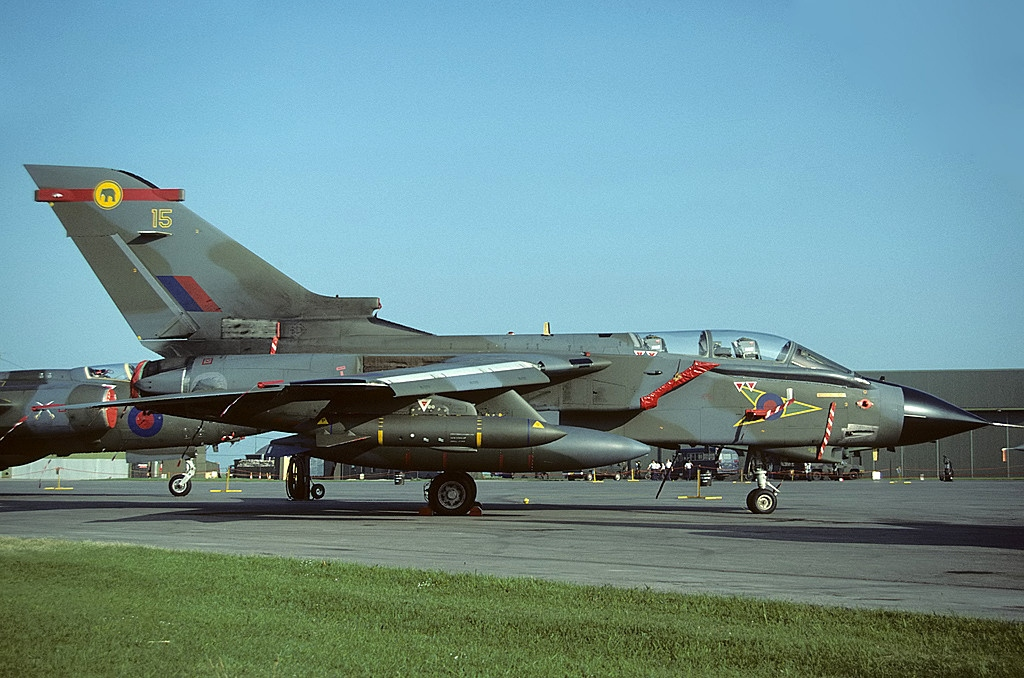
Panavia Tornado GR1, No. 27 Squadron, 1984 (based at Marham between 1983 and 1993)

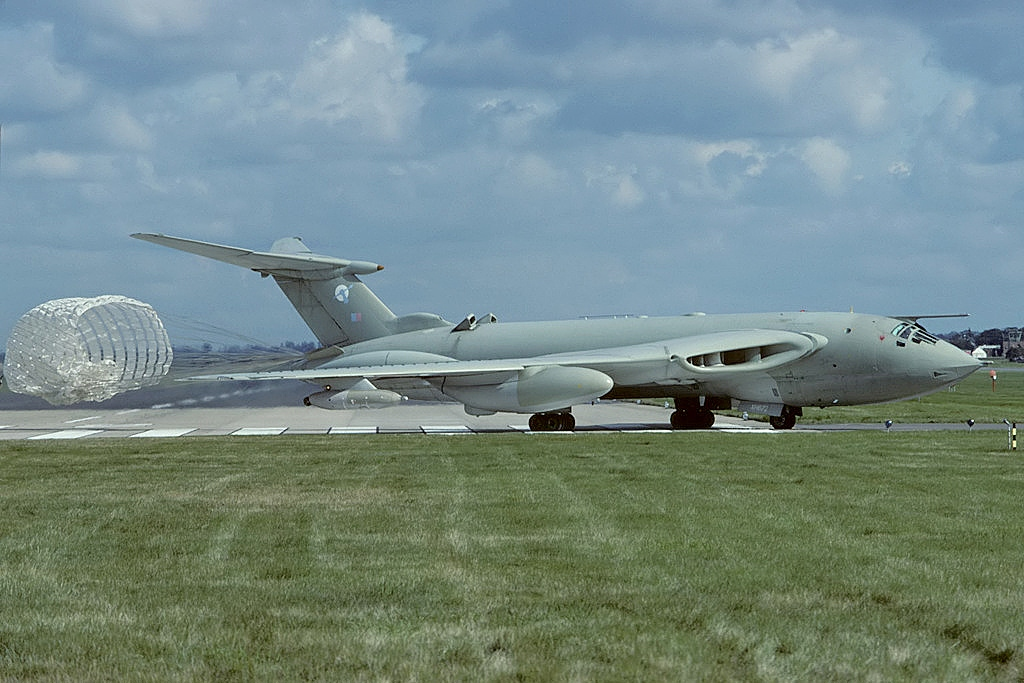
Handley Page Victor K2, No. 55 Squadron at RAF Marham, 1993 (based at Marham between 1966 and 1993)

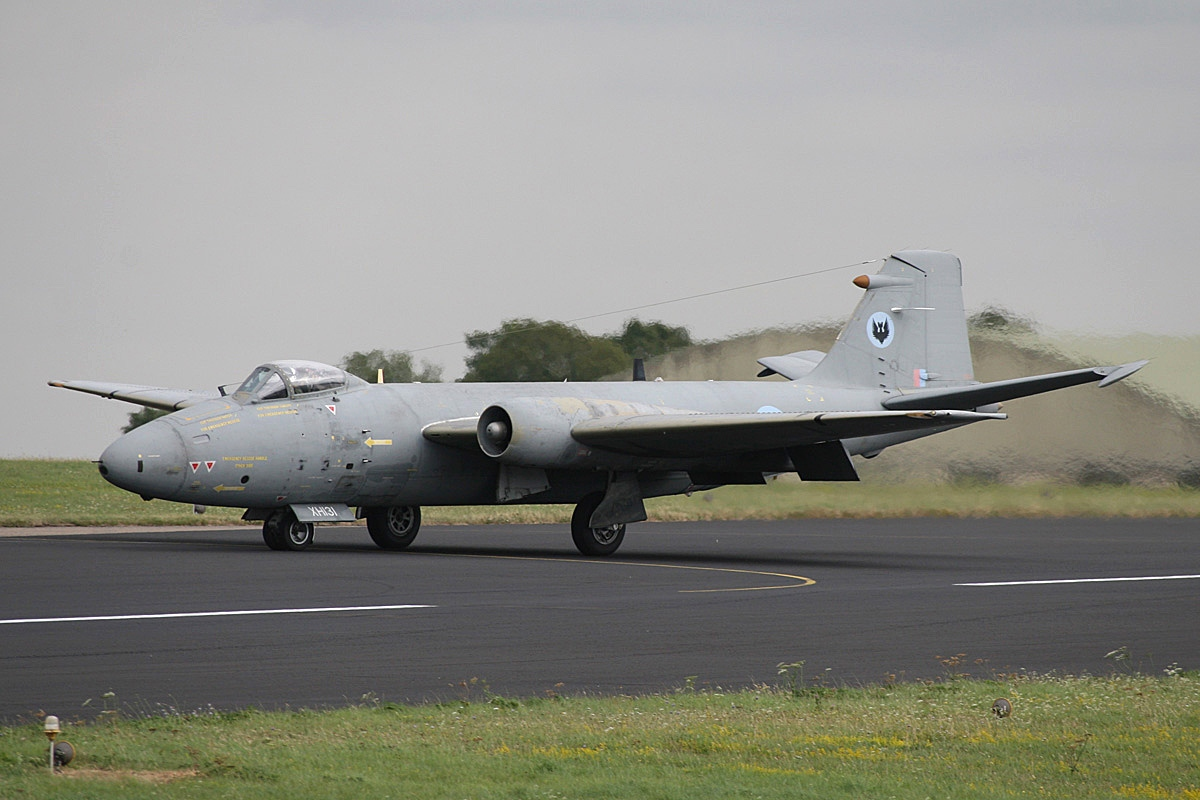
English Electric Canberra PR9, No. 39 (1PRU) Squadron, 2006 (based at Marham between 1993 and 2006)

squadron	dates	aircraft
No. II (AC) Squadron	1992–2015	Panavia Tornado
No. IX (B) Squadron	2001–2019	Panavia Tornado
No. 12 (B) Squadron	1993–1994; 2015–2018	Panavia Tornado
No. XIII Squadron	1994–2011	Panavia Tornado
No. XV Squadron	1950–1951	Avro Lincoln
No. 27 Squadron	1983–1993	Panavia Tornado
No. 31 Squadron	2001–2019	Panavia Tornado
No. 35 Squadron	1951–1956	Boeing Washington, English Electric Canberra
No. 38 Squadron	1937–1940	Fairey Hendon, Vickers Wellington
No. 39 (1PRU) Squadron	1993–2006	English Electric Canberra
No. 44 Squadron	1946–1951	Avro Lincoln, Boeing Washington
No. 49 Squadron	1961–1965	Vickers Valiant
No. 51 Squadron	1916–1919	Royal Aircraft Factory F.E.2b, RAF B.E.2c, RAF B.E.2d, RAF B.E.12
No. 55 Squadron	1966–1993	Handley Page Victor
No. 57 Squadron	1951–1951	Avro Lincoln, Boeing Washington
No. 57 Squadron	1966–1986	Handley Page Victor
No. 90 Squadron	1950–1956	Avro Lincoln, Boeing Washington, English Electric Canberra
No. 100 Squadron	1976–1982	English Electric Canberra
No. 105 Squadron	1942–1944	de Havilland Mosquito
No. 109 Squadron	1943–1944	de Havilland Mosquito
No. 115 Squadron	1937–1941	Fairey Hendon, Handley Page Harrow, Vickers Wellington
No. 115 Squadron	1950–1957	Avro Lincoln, Boeing Washington, English Electric Canberra
No. 139 Squadron	1942–1943	De Havilland Mosquito
No. 148 Squadron	1956–1965	Vickers Valiant
No. 149 Squadron	1950–1950	Avro Lincoln
No. 191 (Night) Training Squadron	1917–1918	Royal Aircraft Factory F.E.2b, RAF B.E.2d, RAF B.E.2e, Airco DH.6
No. 207 Squadron	1951–1956	Boeing Washington, English Electric Canberra
No. 207 Squadron	1956–1965	Vickers Valiant
No. 214 Squadron	1956–1965	Vickers Valiant
No. 214 Squadron	1966–1977	Handley Page Victor
No. 218 Squadron	1940–1942	Vickers Wellington, Short Stirling
No. 242 Squadron	1959–1964	Bristol Bloodhound surface-to-air missile
No. 617 (Dambusters) Squadron	1983–1994	Panavia Tornado
No. 231 OCU	1976–1982	English Electric Canberra
No. 232 OCU	1970–1986	Handley Page Victor B(K)1 / K1 / K2

== See also ==
- List of Royal Air Force stations
