= No. 35 Squadron RAF =

Defunct flying squadron of the Royal Air Force

No. XXXV (Madras Presidency) Squadron RAF
- XXXV Squadron badge
- Active: 1 February 1916 – 26 June 1919; 1 March 1929 – 8 April 1940; 5 November 1940 – 23 February 1950; 1 September 1951 – 11 September 1961; 1 December 1962 – 1 March 1982
- Country: United Kingdom
- Branch: Royal Air Force
- Mottos: Latin: Uno animo agimus ("We act with one accord")
- Battle honours: Western Front, 1917–18*: Arras: Lys: Ypres, 1917*: Cambrai, 1917*: Somme, 1918*: Amiens: Biscay Ports, 1941–43: Fortress Europe, 1941–44*: German Ports, 1943: Ruhr, 1943–45*: Normandy, 1944*: Baltic, 1944: France & Germany, 1944–45*: Walcheren.Honours marked with an asterisk are those emblazoned on the Squadron Standard
- Squadron codes: WT April 1939 – September 1939; TL November 1940 – February 1951; FB September 1950 – April 1951

No. 35 Squadron (also known as No. XXXV (Madras Presidency) Squadron) was a squadron of the Royal Air Force.

== History ==
=== World War I ===
No. 35 Squadron was formed on 1 February 1916 at Thetford, training as a Corps reconnaissance squadron. In January 1917 the squadron moved to France, equipped with the Armstrong Whitworth F.K.8, beginning operations during the Battle of Arras, working alongside the Cavalry Corps, throughout 1917 (which later resulted in the Pegasus winged horses head in the Squadrons' badge). From 19 August to 5 October 1917, the squadron was based at La Gorgue, in Northern France. A flight of Bristol Fighters supplemented its F.K.8s between February and July 1918. The squadron was deployed in support of the Fifth Army during the German Spring Offensive in March 1918, making many attacks against German troops on the first day of the offensive, 21 March, dropping 116 25-lb bombs that day. It continued low level attacks on German troops and in addition to its normal reconnaissance duties throughout the German attacks, it was also involved in night bombing operations during the German offensives. The squadron operated in support of III Corps during the Battle of Amiens in August 1918, and during the attack on the Hindenburg Line in September 1918.

The squadron started to re-equip with Bristol Fighters again in October 1918, but this process was not complete by the end of the war in November that year. It returned to RAF Netheravon in March 1919 and disbanded on 26 June 1919.

=== Between the Wars ===
On 1 March 1929 the squadron reformed at Bircham Newton, and was initially equipped with Airco DH.9As, re-equipping with the Fairey IIIF in November that year. In 1932, its IIIFs were replaced by an improved development, the Fairey Gordon. As a response to the Italian invasion of Ethiopia, the squadron was posted to the Sudan in late 1935, returning to RAF Worthy Down in August 1936, and re-equipping with the Vickers Wellesley. On 12 April 1938 the squadron converted to the Fairey Battle.

=== World War II ===
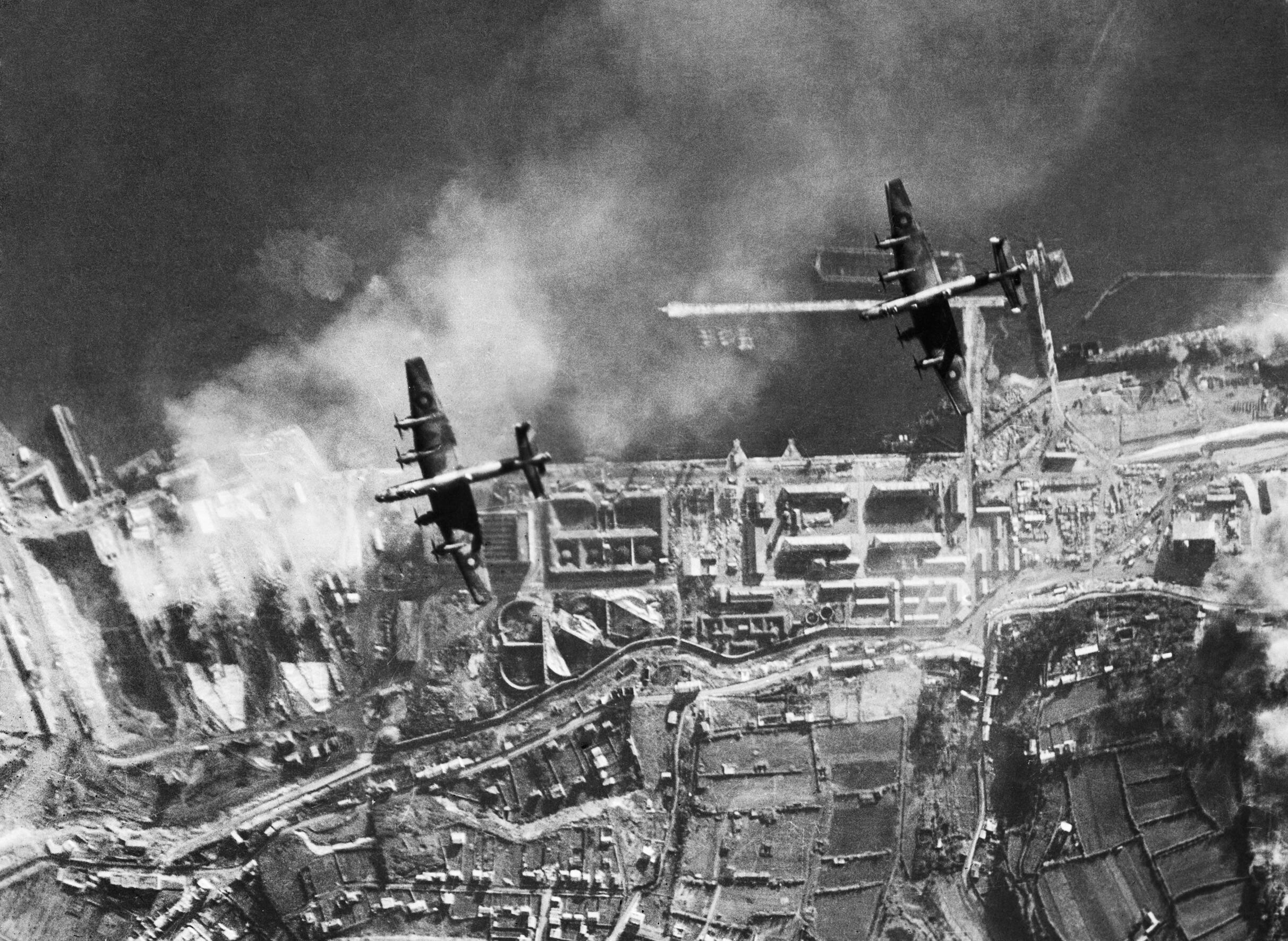
35 Squadron Halifaxes attacking German battleships Scharnhorst and Gneisenau in drydock at Brest, France, December 1941

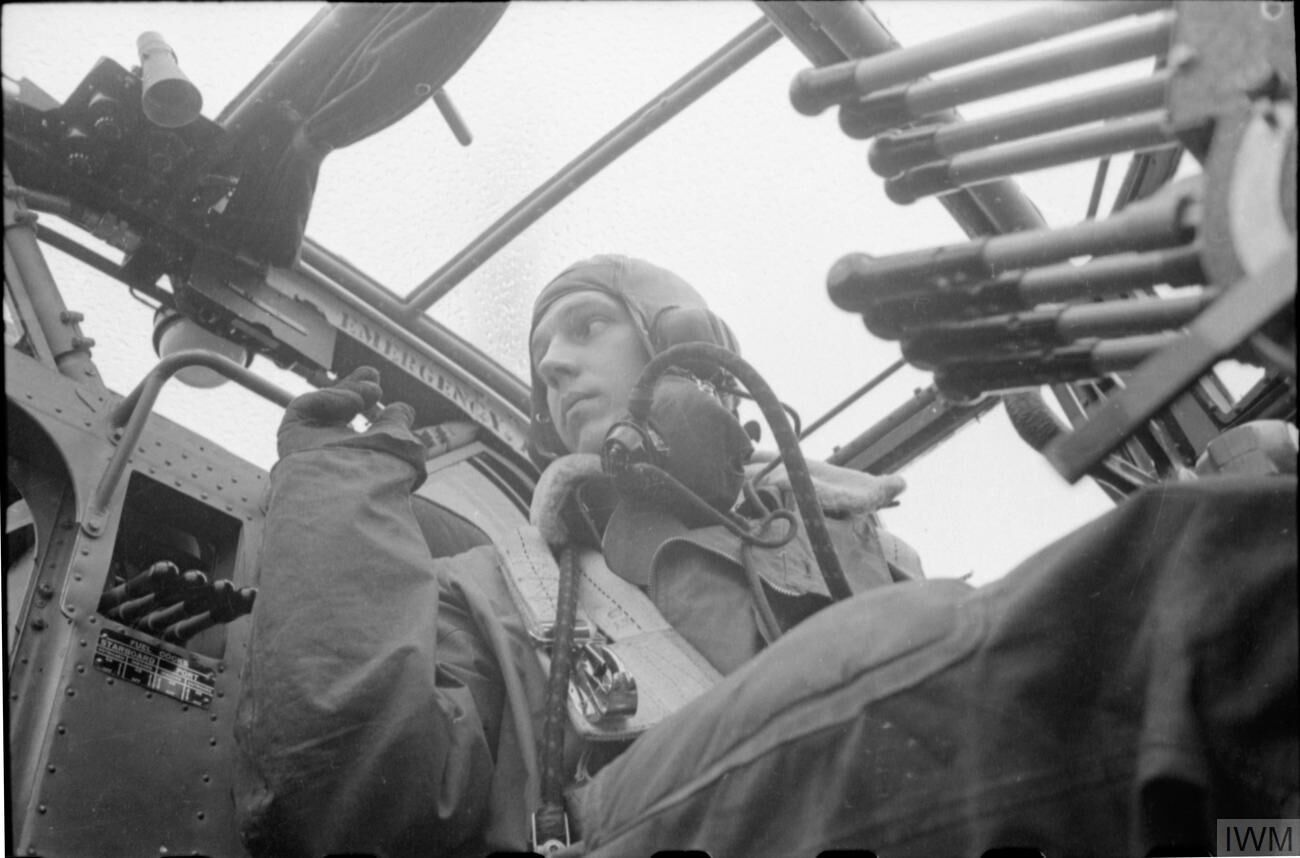
Halifax pilot of 35 Squadron prior to take-off at RAF Linton-on-Ouse, England

On the outbreak of World War II, No. 35 Squadron was designated a training unit, supplementing its Battles with Avro Ansons and Bristol Blenheims late in 1939. The squadron disbanded after being absorbed into No. 17 OTU along with No. 90 Squadron at RAF Upwood, on 8 April 1940.

The squadron reformed on 5 November 1940 as part of 4 Group at RAF Boscombe Down, Wiltshire as the first Handley Page Halifax squadron. It received its first Halifaxes on 13 November, before moving to RAF Leeming, Yorkshire on 20 November, and to RAF Linton-on-Ouse, also in Yorkshire, on 5 December that year. The squadron flew its first operational mission with the Halifax on the night of 11/12 March 1941 when six Halifaxes set out to bomb docks at Le Havre. The squadron continued to fly night bombing attacks against targets in France and Germany through the rest of 1941 and into 1942, its pilots including Leonard Cheshire and James Brian Tait, both later highly decorated commanders of 617 Squadron.

In August 1942 it was one of the five squadrons selected to create the Pathfinder Force. The squadron was based at RAF Graveley. When the Pathfinder Force was enlarged 35 Squadron was a part of the newly designated No. 8 Group. In March 1944 the squadron converted to the Avro Lancaster, which it used till the end of the war.

Sqd Ldr Alec Panton Cranswick DSO, DFC, was in 35 Sqd at the time of his death when his Lancaster was shot down on a raid to Villeneuve St George near Paris on the night of 4 July 1944, it was his 107th mission and he flew more bombing operations than any other RAF pilot in WW2, he was on his 4th operational tour. Although Wg CDR Guy Gibson VC, DSO & BAR, DFC & BAR had a higher ops tally a percentage of them were fighter ops making his bomber ops total less than Sqd Ldr Cranswick.

=== Postwar ===
In 1946, in addition to participating in the Victory flypast over London the squadron participated in a goodwill tour of the United States, later returning to RAF Stradishall, due to Graveley's closure. The Lancasters were replaced by Avro Lincolns in September 1949, and the squadron later disbanded on 23 February 1950. On 1 September 1951 the squadron reformed at Marham equipped with the Boeing Washington.

In April 1954 the squadron re-equipped with its first jet powered aircraft type, the Canberra B.2 twin engined light bomber. The squadron again disbanded on 11 September 1961.

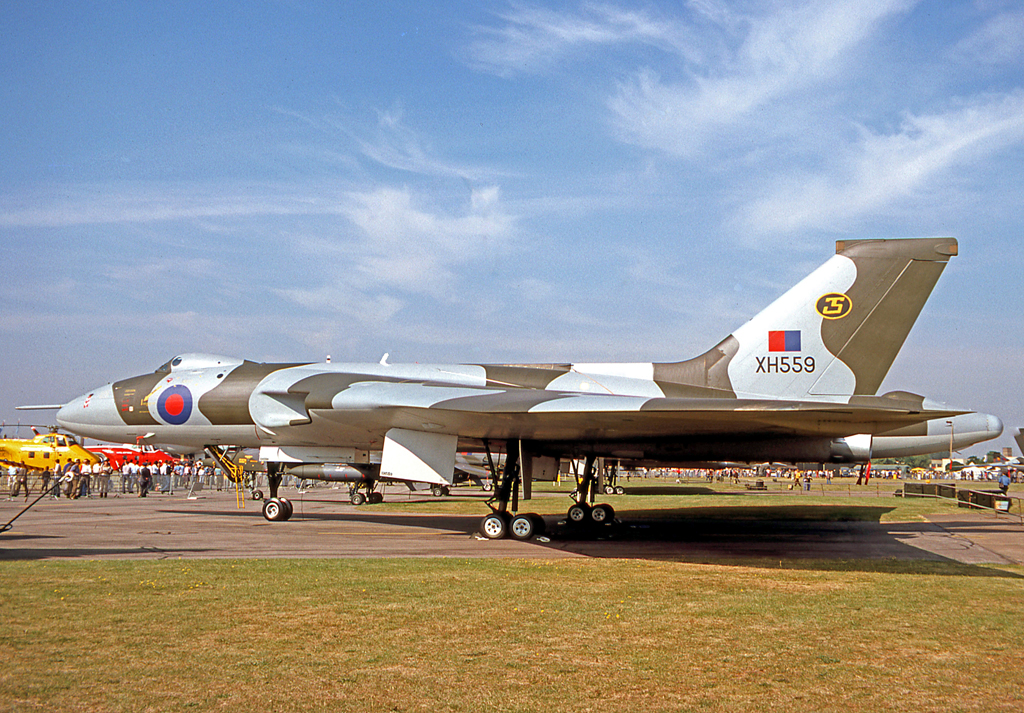
Avro Vulcan B.2 of No. 35 Squadron at the RAF Queen's Silver Jubilee Review at RAF Finningley in July 1977.

No. 35 Squadron reformed for the last time on 1 December 1962 at RAF Coningsby as part of RAF Bomber Command's V-bomber force, equipped with eight Vulcan B2 aircraft and Yellow Sun free-falling bombs in a high-altitude strategic bombing role, moving to RAF Cottesmore on 7 November 1964. When the WE.177B strategic bomb became available from mid-1966, eight were issued to No. 35 Squadron at Cottesmore. These laydown bombs were specifically designed for the low-level penetration role, did not require a pre-release 'pop-up' manoeuvre, and improved the survivability of the squadron's Vulcans.

Following the transfer of responsibility for the nuclear deterrent to the Royal Navy the squadron joined the Near East Strike Force at RAF Akrotiri, Cyprus, still equipped with eight Vulcan B2s and eight WE.177 nuclear weapons and a variety of conventional weapons. The squadron remained at Akrotiri with 9 Squadron's similarly equipped Vulcans assigned as part of the UK contribution to CENTO the Central Treaty Organisation, for use in the low-level penetration role until the end of 1974, returning to RAF Scampton in January 1975 where the squadron disbanded for the last time on 1 March 1982.

== See also ==
- List of Royal Air Force aircraft squadrons
