= No. 191 Squadron RAF =

Defunct flying squadron of the Royal Air Force

- Active: 6 Nov 1917 – Jan 1919; 17 May 1943 – 15 Jun 1945
- Country: United Kingdom
- Branch: Royal Air Force
- Mottos: Latin: Vidi Vici ("I saw, I conquered")

Commanders
- Notable commanders: Arthur Travers Harris

Insignia
- Squadron Badge heraldry: A dolphin
- Squadron Codes: No codes known to have been used

No. 191 Squadron was a Royal Air Force squadron. During World War I it was a non-operational night training unit, while during World War II it was engaged in maritime reconnaissance.

== History ==
=== Formation in World War I ===
No. 191 Squadron was formed at RAF Marham on 6 November 1917 as a night training squadron, operating amongst others the Royal Aircraft Factory FE.2bs and FE.2ds. The squadron moved to RAF Upwood in 1918 and was disbanded there in January 1919.

=== Reformation in World War II ===
The squadron was re-formed on 13 May 1943 at Korangi Creek, India. The squadron operated the Consolidated Catalina to patrol the Persian Gulf and the western Indian Ocean. The squadron moved to Red Hills Lake, India in November 1944. The Catalina's continued to carry out anti-submarine patrols and meteorological flights. The squadron disbanded on 15 June 1945 at RAF Koggala, Ceylon.

== Aircraft operated ==
Aircraft operated by No. 191 Squadron RAF
| From | To | Aircraft | Variant |
|---|---|---|---|
| Nov 1917 | Jan 1919 | Royal Aircraft Factory F.E.2 | 2b and 2d |
| May 1943 | Jun 1945 | Consolidated Catalina | Mk.Ib |
| May 1944 | Jun 1945 | Consolidated Catalina | Mk.IVb |

== See also ==
- List of Royal Air Force aircraft squadrons
