= RAF Upwood =

Former Royal Air Force station in Cambridgeshire, England

RAF Upwood
- Near Bury, Cambridgeshire in England
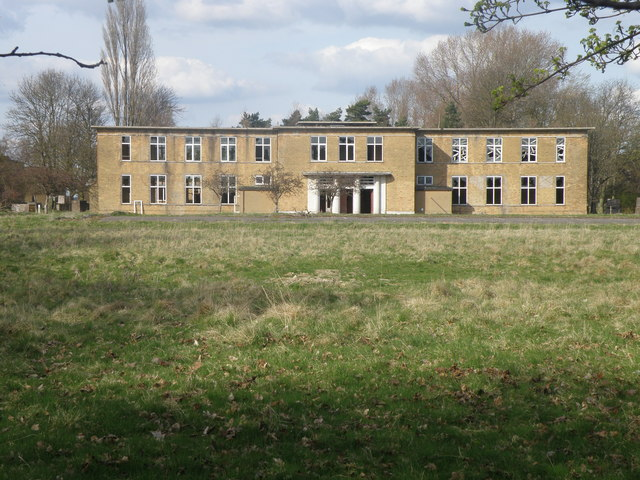
- Former administration building during 2009.

- Pro aris et focis (Latin for 'For Hearth and Home')

Site information
- Type: Flying station and later non-flying support station
- Owner: Ministry of Defence
- Operator: Royal Flying Corps (1917–1919); Royal Air Force (1936–1981); United States Air Force (1981–1995)
- Condition: Closed

Location
- Location in Cambridgeshire RAF Upwood (the United Kingdom)
- Coordinates: 52°26′25″N 000°08′02″W
- Grid reference: TL270845

Site history
- Built: 1917 and 1936
- In use: 1917–1919 and 1936–2012
- Fate: Sold for various civilian uses.

Airfield information
- Elevation: 22 metres (72 ft) AMSL
Runways
Direction	Length and surface
00/00
00/00
00/00

Royal Air Force Upwood or more simply RAF Upwood is a former Royal Air Force station adjacent to the village of Upwood, Cambridgeshire, England, in the United Kingdom.

From 1981 it was a non-flying station under the control of the United States Air Force, and one of three RAF stations in Cambridgeshire used by the United States Air Forces in Europe (USAFE). Upwood, along with RAF Molesworth and RAF Alconbury are considered the "Tri-Base Area" due to their close geographic proximity, and interdependency.

== History ==
=== First World War ===
The Royal Flying Corps requisitioned 160 acres (0.65 km^{2}) of farmland near the village of Upwood, Huntingdonshire, in 1917. In September of that year the station opened as Bury (Ramsey). This initial name referred to its location near the village of Bury and the larger market town of Ramsey. Initially there were no permanent flying units assigned to the station. Instead, No. 75 Squadron flying Royal Aircraft Factory B.E.2 aircraft out of nearby RAF Elmswell, Suffolk, used the station as a night-landing ground and satellite field.

When it opened, there were no permanent buildings at the airfield. By the summer of 1918 a number of huts and five hangars were in place. It was during this time that the field was renamed Upwood.

In July 1918, No. 191 (Night) Training Squadron moved to Upwood. In addition to BE.2s, 191 NTS also flew the Airco DH.6. Whilst at Upwood they converted to the Royal Aircraft Factory F.E.2b.

In October 1918, No. 190 (Night) Training Squadron arrived flying the Avro 504K.

After the end of the First World War in November 1918, the squadrons were no longer needed and were disbanded in May and June 1919. The airfield itself was returned to the local community and the buildings cleared. This ended the first round of activity at RAF Upwood.

=== The Inter-War years ===
In the early 1930s, Britain realised its air defence capabilities were in urgent need of expansion. The major expansion of the Royal Air Force announced in 1934 resulted in many new airfields opening over the remainder of the decade. One of these was RAF Upwood. The old First World War airfield site was selected to be reactivated and expanded. The new station was designed to accommodate two medium bomber squadrons with room for a third. By 1936, construction had begun in earnest with two of five C-type hangars started.

On 27 February 1937 the first flying unit arrived at Upwood in the form of No. 52 Squadron RAF flying Hawker Hinds. This unit was joined on 1 March 1937 by No. 63 Squadron and its Hawker Audaxes.

During their time at Upwood, No 52 and 63 Squadrons became training units and took on both Fairey Battle and Avro Anson aircraft. In August and September 1939, the two squadrons were reassigned opening the field up to its new tenant, No. 90 Squadron flying Bristol Blenheims.

=== Second World War ===
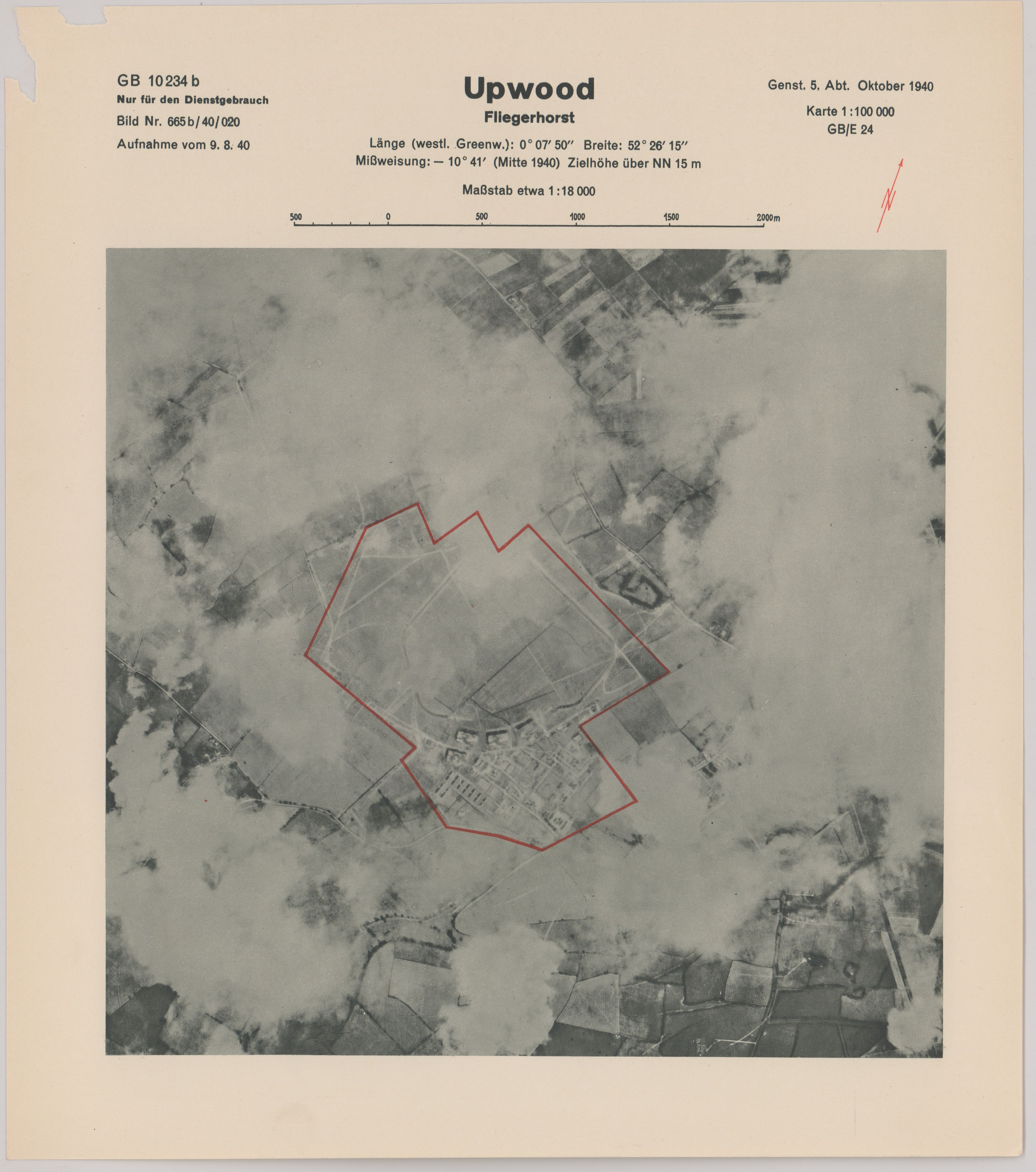
RAF Upwood on a target dossier of the German Luftwaffe, 1940

With the invasion of Poland on 1 September 1939, Second World War was underway. However No 90 Squadron spent most of its time in air-to-air firing and bombing practice. They were joined in February 1940 by another medium bomber unit, No. 35 Squadron, flying both Blenheims and Ansons.

Neither of these Upwood squadrons were destined to see front-line combat as, on 8 April 1940, they were merged into the new No. 17 Operational Training Unit RAF and tasked with training aircrews. (Both squadrons later re-formed elsewhere.)

Although the Upwood units were not taking a direct part in the war, they did see some action. On two occasions in 1940 and once in 1942 the airfield was attacked by Luftwaffe aircraft. However, only one person was killed during these raids.

On 1 February 1941 a German spy, Josef Jakobs, was captured by farmers after he had parachuted into the area, breaking a leg in the process. He was discovered to have maps of the RAF Upwood area, a code device and almost £500 cash in his possession. Jakobs was sent to London where, after a preliminary interrogation by MI5, he spent several months at Dulwich Hospital. Jakobs was transferred to Camp 020 in April 1941 where he was interrogated by agents of MI5. On August 4 and 5, Jakobs was tried by court-martial at the Duke of York's Headquarters where he was found guilty of treachery. Jakobs was executed by firing squad at the Tower of London on 15 August 1941.

Since its opening in 1937, Upwood had seen frequent periods where flying operations had to be curtailed or halted altogether due to the grass airfield being unserviceable. This unserviceability was caused by the levels of rain and general dampness of the area. When No 17 OTU was chosen for transition to Vickers Wellington bombers, it was decided to move the unit from Upwood as the field would never take the pounding from these heavier aircraft. When 17 OTU departed for RAF Silverstone in April 1943, Upwood was left with no aircraft. The RAF took this opportunity to begin construction of three concrete runways. These runways were completed by October.

The first flying unit to use the new runways at Upwood was No 139 Squadron flying De Havilland Mosquitoes. They arrived in late January 1944 and flew their first mission against on 2 February, a single plane mission to drop target indicators over Berlin. On 5 March 1944 Upwood became home to No 156 Squadron and its Avro Lancasters. They flew their first mission from Upwood on 15 March 1944, attacking Stuttgart with 22 aircraft.

At its wartime peak, the station had a working population of over 2,500 people. A total of 210 aircrew from the two squadrons were killed as a result of operations.

=== Cold War era ===
With the end of the Second World War came a change in missions for the two squadrons at Upwood. No 156 Squadron was tasked with bringing food to the Netherlands in support of Operation Manna then help repatriate former Prisoners of War as part of Operation Exodus. On 27 June 1945 the squadron was moved from Upwood.

In place of the departing No 156 Squadron came No 105 Squadron, also flying Mosquitos. Both 105 and 139 Squadrons continued flying from RAF Upwood until February 1946. On 1 February 1946 No 139 Squadron moved to RAF Hemswell. On 4 February 1946 No. 105 Squadron was disbanded.

Flying operations didn't cease for long. On 15 February 1946 Upwood became home to No. 102 Squadron flying Consolidated B-24 Liberator bombers. They spent the next several months bringing British troops home from India. On 1 March 1946 the squadron was redesignated No 53. Squadron. The squadron was disbanded on 25 June 1946 soon after its last ferry flight.

Two new squadrons of Lancasters called Upwood home starting on 29 July 1946 with arrival of No. 7 Squadron and No. 49 Squadron. On 4 November 1946 No. 148 Squadron and No. 214 Squadron were both reformed at Upwood. These new additions were part of a transition of Upwood from a training to attack mission. Both of the new squadrons also flew Lancasters.

The four squadrons continued to fly their Lancasters until 1949 when they were transitioned to Avro Lincolns. Lincolns from 148 Squadron deployed to RAF Shallufa in January 1952 to reinforce British units in the Suez Canal Zone. This was in response to riots in Cairo and a generally unstable political situation in Egypt.

During 1954 each of the four squadrons deployed to either RAF Tengah in Singapore in support of anti-communist operations in Malaysia or to Kenya in support of operations against the Mau Mau. Additionally, Lincolns from No 214 Squadron and No 7 Squadron took part in a secret mission in connection with nuclear trials conducted near Woomera, Australia. During this time a film production company produced a war time film play called Appointment in London. The company used three Lancasters in making the film but the background shots are of the four Squadrons of Lincolns and the film uses much of the airfield and buildings in its production showing a good view of Upwood at that time

On 31 December 1954 Upwood lost one of its four flying units when No. 214 Squadron disbanded. This unit was replaced on 22 May 1955 when No. 18 Squadron moved to Upwood from RAF Scampton. This squadron brought something completely new to the base in the form of their English Electric Canberra jet bombers. This was followed by more Canberras when No. 61 Squadron moved in from RAF Wittering on 3 July 1955.

Two more Lincoln squadrons disbanded on 1 August, 49 and 148. This was followed by the disbanding of the last Lincoln squadron, No. 7, on 1 January 1956. These were replaced throughout 1956 by more Canberra units; No. 50 Squadron on 9 January, No. 35 Squadron on 16 July and No. 40 Squadron on 1 November. However, this last squadron was disbanded on 15 December 1956.

Eight Canberras B2 each from Nos. 7, 18,35,50 and 61 Squadron flew to Cyprus on 19 October in support of Operation Musketeer (1956). Over four days in early November, these aircraft took part in raids on various targets in Egypt. This was the first combat operations by Upwood aircraft since the Second World War. The 32 planes returned to Upwood just in time for Christmas, arriving home on 24 December 1956.

The next two years saw a series of unit disbandments and arrivals culminating in a slow winding down of flying operations at Upwood. On 1 February 1957, No. 18 Squadron was disbanded. On 31 March 1958 No. 61 Squadron disbanded. No. 542 Squadron arrived on 17 July along with No. 76 Squadron. No 542 Squadron was renamed to No. 21 Squadron on 1 October. The year 1959 saw the disbanding of No. 21 Squadron (15 January) and No. 50 Squadron (1 October). On 31 December 1960 No. 76 Squadron disbanded. The final flying unit No. 35 Squadron was disbanded on 11 September 1961.

With the disbanding of No. 35 Squadron Upwood was transferred to RAF Strike Command who quickly set about transforming the airfield into a hub of various support activities. Over the next several months the station became home to No 4 Ground Radio Servicing Section, Radio Technical Publications Squadron, the Aeromedical Training Centre, the Joint School of Photographic Interpretation and three squadrons of HQ No 33 Field Wing, RAF Regiment.

The different units had barely settled in when change came again. In early 1963 the RAF Regiment units departed. In 1964 the other units left as well, leaving Upwood with only a token care-taker staff.

In March 1964, 22 Group of Technical Training Command arrived and set up their School of Management and Work Study. July saw the arrival of the School of Education and the RAF Central Library, followed in September by the School of Administration. Upwood was again becoming focused on training. Later training units included the Equipment Officers Training Centre and the Air Cadet Training Centre.

These various training activities lasted, in one form or another, until the late 1970s. By 1981, the station was again almost dormant.

=== United States Air Force Use ===
With the end of RAF use of the station in 1981, the United States Air Force was given control of Upwood by the Ministry of Defence. USAF airmen from RAF Alconbury had been living in the Upwood housing area since the mid-1970s, however when the 10th Tactical Reconnaissance Wing took over as the host unit in December 1981, it started a whole new round of activity.

Upwood soon became a satellite station of RAF Alconbury, providing housing and support services for personnel stationed there. In May 1986, all contracting support services moved from RAF Alconbury to the Headquarters building at RAF Upwood. Operating Location 'C', Detachment 4, 7000 Contracting Squadron (OL-C Det 4, 7000 CONS) was an Operating Location out of Detachment 4, 7000 Contracting Squadron at RAF Lakenheath and provided all contracting support services for RAF Alconbury and RAF Upwood. Also in 1986, a multimillion-dollar medical facility was opened to provide out-patient services to American military members and dependents in the area.

Upwood was also home to the USAF's 3rd AF Mathies/UK campus for the NCO Academy and NCO Leadership School for USAF enlisted Professional Military Education (PME). The Department of Defense Dependent Schools (DoDDS) operated numerous buildings as classrooms for dependent children on RAF Upwood. In the event of a NEO (Non-combatant Evacuation Order), dependents would be evacuated from the base, and the buildings would be converted into a contingency hospital with supplies and equipment stored in a climate-controlled hangar on the base.

=== Post-Cold War ===
With the end of the Cold War in 1991, and the phasedown of RAF Alconbury beginning in 1994, the USAF activities at Upwood were curtailed. RAF Upwood was returned to the British government control in September 1995 and with the number of airmen assigned to the area reduced, the need for housing became less and less. By 2005 the last USAF family moved out of the Upwood housing area and it was returned to the MOD.

The medical facilities, however, remain open albeit in a reduced capacity as a medical flight until 16 January 2007, when the 423rd Medical Squadron was formed. The squadron provided some outpatient medical and dental care for the community.

The host unit for RAF Upwood was the 423d Air Base Group, headquartered at nearby RAF Alconbury.

RAF Upwood was the home of the 423rd Medical Squadron. The squadron operated a medical complex which housed out-patient and dental care facilities for active-duty, dependents of active duty, Department of Defense civilians, and retired military personnel stationed in the Tri-base area. Most standard medical care was available. Complex medical cases could be referred to RAF Croughton (approximately 48 miles (77 km) west of RAF Alconbury) for care which is unavailable at RAF Upwood, or to local British civilian National Health Service facilities.

On 26 October 2012 RAF Upwood 423rd MDS closed its door to patients for the last time and merged with its sister station and became part of RAF Alconbury.

In 1999 the entire NCO married quarter estate including both pre war and post housing and the former NAAFI building were sold to Roger Byron-Collins' the Welbeck Estate Group and were renamed Fairmead Park and underwent a major upgrading.

== Current status ==
Since 1982, the Nene Valley Gliding Club has conducted its glider operations from a field that occupies the site of the old runways. Initially these operations were under an agreement with the Ministry of Defence. However, in 1995 the club was told they would need to find a new home as the land was going to be sold off. The club was unable to locate a suitable new home and was preparing for the possibility of having to close when the purchaser of the land, Marshal Papworth, agreed to lease the land to the club for 10 years. This has allowed the club to continue flying from Marshals Paddock (so named by the club after their benefactor's death in 2000).

Much of the RAF Upwood is unused, closed by the Ministry of Defence in 1994. Most of the station was vacated and the land and buildings sold off to civil ownership.

Upwood is also the home of No. 511 (Ramsey) Squadron Air Training Corps who have been on the site since the early 70s. Originally housed in the old fire station the squadron moved to a number of buildings before settling in the old nissen hut church building. When the station was closed by the MOD in 1995, the squadron moved to the Upwood school. The squadron finally settled into the present building inside the fence in 1997.

In 2004 Turbine Motor Works purchased a large amount of property on the former base including the four C-type hangars. Their plan is to convert the property into a state-of-the-art jet engine overhaul facility. Together with the Nene Valley Gliding Club and the Air Cadet Squadron, this facility will ensure that the former RAF base will continue its aviation legacy well into the 21st century.

Part of the facility is now used by airsoft players.

For a number of years, the site was home to the Ramsey 1940s Weekend, an event dedicated to recreating the sights and sounds of the 1940s. The event is held in aid of several local charities and has been rewarded with a tourism award. The weekend features living history re-enactors, period dancing, food, exhibitions and trade stands. This has now moved to the north-west side of Ramsey to "The Camp", a former searchlight base.

The American medical wing was disused as of early 2013, and was demolished over the period of September/October 2015 to make way for private housing.

== In popular culture ==
RAF Upwood was extensively used as a filming location during the making of the 1953 war film Appointment in London starring Dirk Bogarde, directed by Phillip Leacock. In 2017, it was the setting for the pop video Angry Emoticon by Brendan Kavanagh, featuring Terry Miles.

== See also ==
- List of former Royal Air Force stations
- List of United States Air Force installations
- United States Air Force in the United Kingdom
