= Avro Lincoln =

British four-engined heavy bomber in service 1945-1963

Lincoln
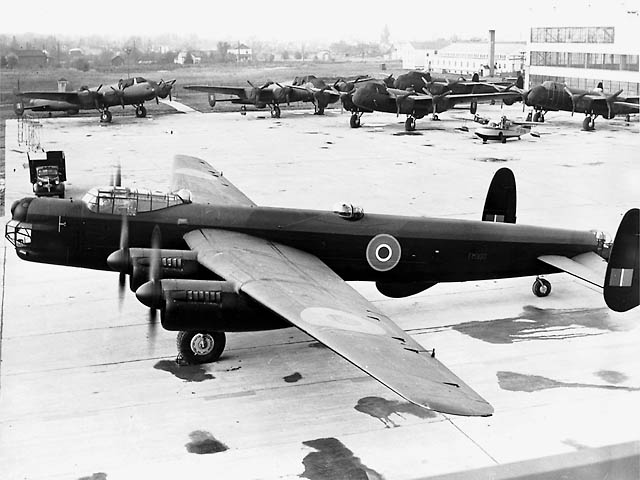
- The only Canadian-built Avro Lincoln

General information
- Type: Heavy bomber
- National origin: United Kingdom
- Manufacturer: A V Roe (168)
- Built by: Metropolitan-Vickers (80); Armstrong Whitworth (281)
- Status: Retired
- Primary users: Royal Air Force: Argentine Air Force; Royal Australian Air Force
- Number built: 604

History
- Introduction date: 1945
- First flight: 9 June 1944
- Retired: 1961 Royal Australian Air Force; 1963 Royal Air Force; 1967 Argentine Air Force
- Developed from: Avro Lancaster
- Developed into: Avro Shackleton; Avro Tudor

The Avro Type 694 Lincoln is a British four-engined heavy bomber, which first flew on 9 June 1944. Developed from the Avro Lancaster, the first Lincoln variants were initially known as the Lancaster IV and V; these were renamed Lincoln I and II. It was the last piston-engined bomber operated by the Royal Air Force (RAF); the later Avro Shackleton, though piston-engined, served in maritime patrol rather than bomber roles.

The Lincoln attained operational status in August 1945. It had been initially assigned to units of the Tiger Force, a Commonwealth heavy bomber force which had been intended to play a role in the Japan campaign in the closing stages of the Second World War, but the war ended before the Lincoln could participate. Production of the type proceeded and the type was adopted in quantity, complementing and progressively replacing the Lancaster in RAF service during the late 1940s.

The Lincoln was deployed on operations during the 1950s. RAF squadrons equipped with the type fought against guerrilla fighters during the Mau Mau Uprising in Kenya; the RAF and the Royal Australian Air Force (RAAF) also operated the Lincoln during the Malayan Emergency. The type also saw significant peacetime service with the RAF, RAAF and the Argentine Air Force. Lincolns were also operated in civil aviation, including use as aerial test beds for aero-engine research.

In RAF service, the Lincoln was replaced by a new generation of bombers using jet propulsion. In 1967 the last Lincoln bombers in service, in Argentina, were retired.

== Design and development ==
=== Origins ===
The Avro Lincoln originated from a design produced by Roy Chadwick as a development of the earlier Lancaster bomber which had been produced with the purpose of conforming with the requirements of the Specification B.14/43. Known initially as the Lancaster IV and Lancaster V, the envisioned aircraft, while considerably similar to the Lancaster, had numerous improvements such as the adoption of stronger, longer span, higher aspect ratio (10.30 compared with 8.02) wings, and two-stage supercharged Rolls-Royce Merlin 85 engines fitted within Universal Power Plant (UPP) installations. The new bomber also had an enlarged fuselage that accommodated increased fuel and bomb loads and allowed up to 11 tons of various armaments and equipment fittings, including the Grand Slam bomb, to be carried. It had a higher operational ceiling and longer range than the Lancaster, with a maximum altitude of 35,000 ft (6.6 mi; 11 km) and a maximum range of 4,450 miles (7,160 km).

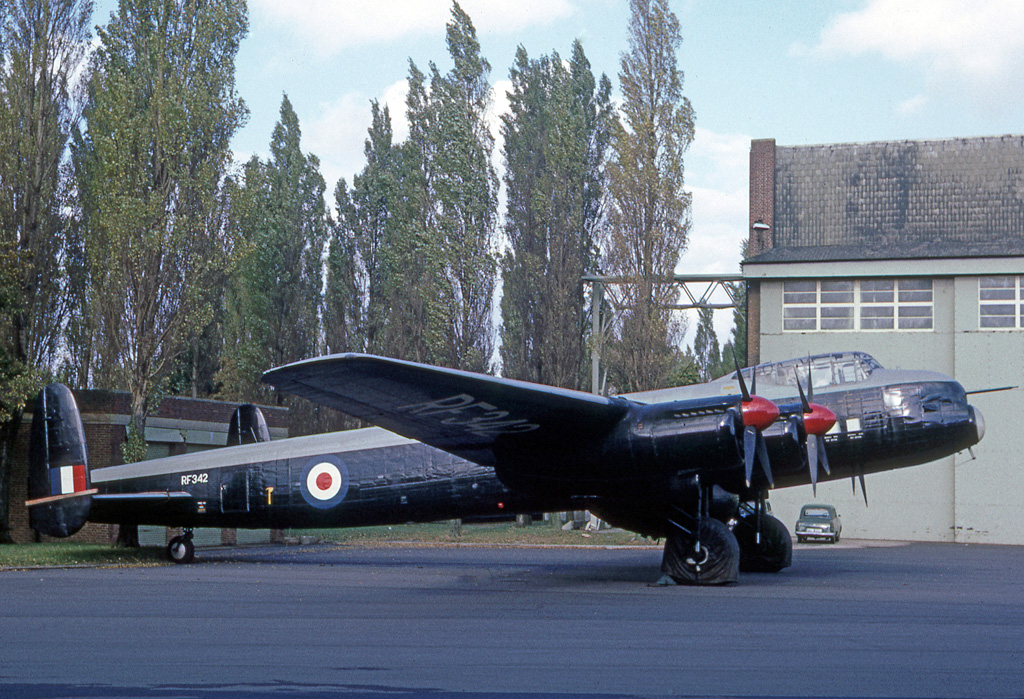
Royal Air Force Lincoln B.2 used by Napier's for icing research work until 1967 (1966)

The prototype Lancaster IV, later renamed the Lincoln I, was assembled by Avro's experimental flight department at Manchester's Ringway Airport. According to aviation author Kev Delve, development of the Lincoln had proceeded relatively smoothly. On 9 June 1944, the prototype conducted its maiden flight from Ringway Airport. Testing of the prototype quickly proved it to have favourable flight characteristics. In February 1945 the first production Lincoln was completed.

The type was mainly produced at Avro's Woodford, Cheshire and Chadderton Lancashire factories; additional aircraft were also constructed by Armstrong Whitworth at their Coventry facilities. Separate production lines were also established in Canada and Australia, although, as a consequence of the end of the war, production in Canada was halted after only a single aircraft had been constructed. Lincolns were manufactured in Australia and operated by the Royal Australian Air Force (RAAF).

From early 1945 the British Government set about restoring the country to a peacetime stance, with drastic reductions to the armed forces including the disbanding of many squadrons of the Royal Air Force (RAF). A new emphasis was soon placed on 'quality over quantity' during the rationalisation process, seeking to employ fewer but more capable aircraft to perform their envisioned roles; while there was no longer any urgency in bringing new types of aircraft into service, limited procurement of equipment that fell within this ethos did proceed. In accordance with this aim, the British Air Ministry proceeded to formulate and release Specification B.14/43, which sought an improved piston-engined heavy bomber to replace the wartime four-engine bombers, the Short Stirling, the Handley Page Halifax, and the Avro Lancaster.

=== Further development ===
One Lincoln B Mk XV pattern aircraft was completed in Canada by Victory Aircraft; a follow-up order for a total of six RCAF variants was cancelled shortly following the end of hostilities. Along with two additional Lincoln (Mk I and Mk II) aircraft on loan from the RAF, the type was briefly evaluated postwar by the RCAF. The Lancaster V/Lincoln II differed mainly in that it was fitted with Merlin 68A engines.

Prior to the Lincoln being developed, the Australian government had already formulated plans for its Department of Aircraft Production (DAP), later known as the Government Aircraft Factory (GAF), to construct the earlier Lancaster Mk III. In its place, it was decided to proceed with manufacturing a variant of the Lincoln I, re-designated the Lincoln Mk 30, to replace the Consolidated Liberators. This model was manufactured between 1946 and 1949, and is the largest aircraft ever constructed in Australia. Orders for a total of 85 Mk 30 Lincolns were placed by the RAAF, although only 73 were produced.

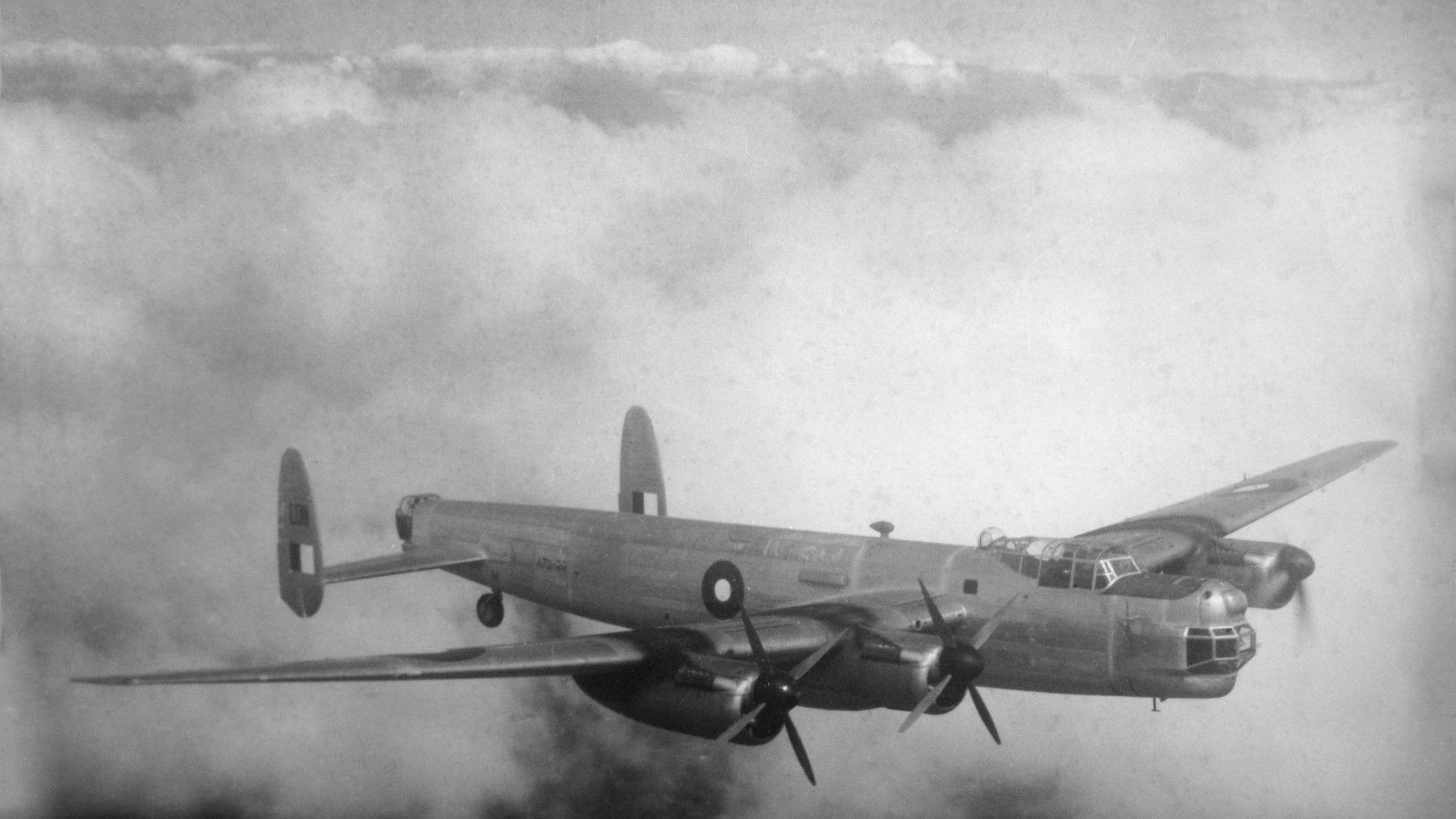
Lincoln A73-20 during a test flight. Both starboard engines have their propeller blades feathered.

The first five Australian examples (A73–1 to A73–5), were assembled at Fishermans Bend using a large proportion of imported British-made components. On 17 March 1946, A73-1 conducted its début flight; the first entirely Australian-built Lincoln, A73-6, was formally delivered in November 1946. The Mk 30 initially used four Merlin 85 engines, this arrangement was later changed to a combination of two outboard Merlin 66s and two inboard Merlin 85s. A further improved later version, the Lincoln Mk 30A, had four Merlin 102s.

During the 1950s, the RAAF modified some of their Mk 30 aircraft for anti-submarine warfare (ASW) re-naming them Lincoln GR.Mk 31. These examples had a 6 ft 6 in (1.98 m) longer nose to house acoustic submarine detection gear and its operators, larger fuel tanks to provide the aircraft with a 13-hour flight endurance, and a modified bomb bay to accommodate torpedoes. According to pilot feedback, the Lincoln Mk 31 was particularly difficult to land at night, as the bomber had a tailwheel undercarriage and the long nose obstructed the pilot's view of the runway. In 1952, 18 aircraft were rebuilt to this standard, and were reallocated new serial numbers. Ten were subsequently upgraded to the MR.Mk 31 standard, which included an updated radar.

Further aircraft were also derived from the Lincoln. A dedicated maritime patrol aircraft, designated the Avro Shackleton, was developed for the RAF and the South African Air Force (SAAF). Avro decided to develop a commercial airliner, known as the Tudor, which used elements of the Lincoln, such as its wings, in combination with various new elements, such as the adoption of a pressurised fuselage, to perform passenger operations.

== Operational history ==
=== Royal Air Force ===
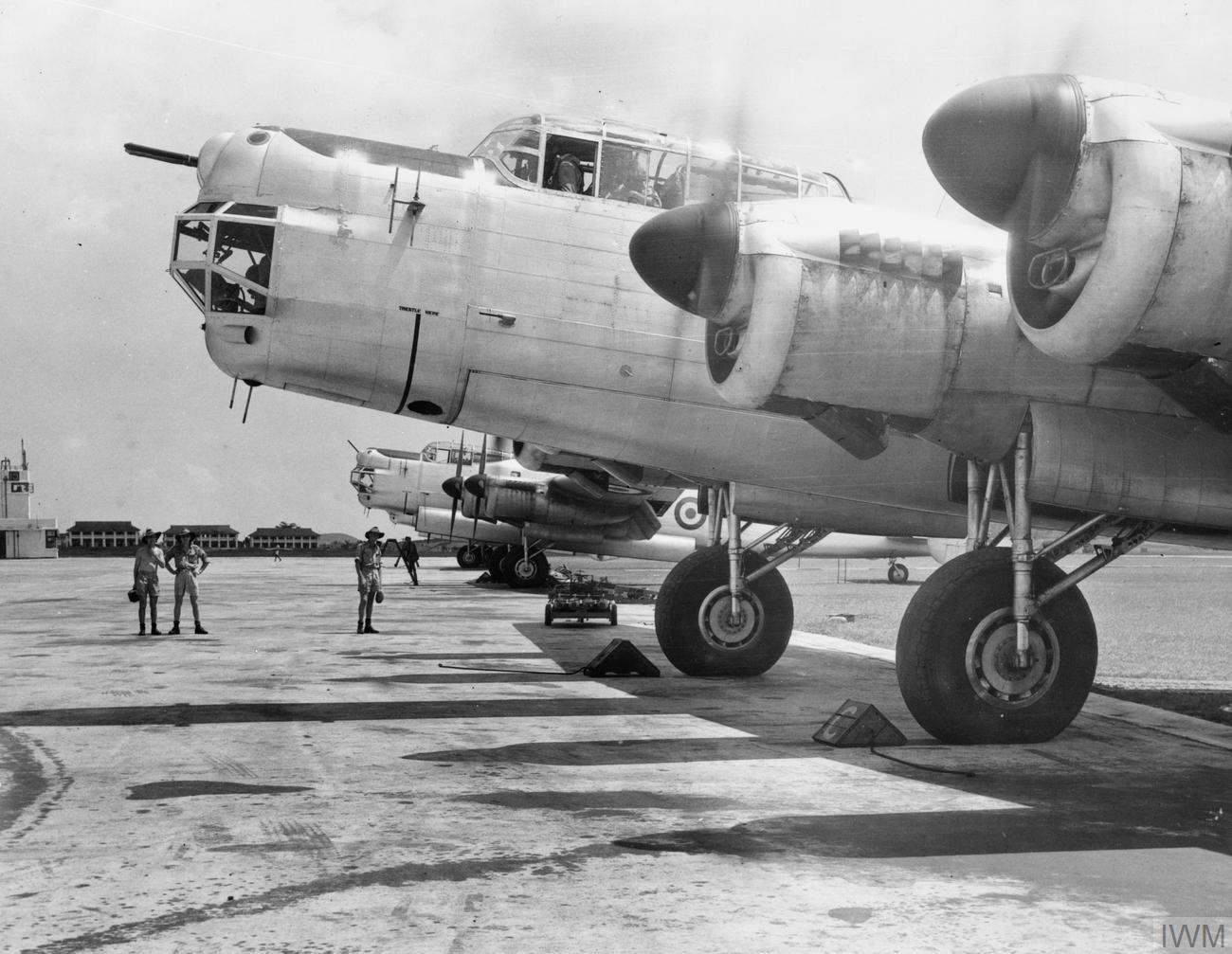
Lineup of the first operation of No. 1 Squadron, Royal Australian Air Force at RAF Tengah, Singapore, August 1950

During 1945, the RAF received its first Lincoln, which was delivered to 57 Squadron based at RAF East Kirkby, Lincolnshire. In August 1945, 75 (New Zealand) Squadron began to re-equip with the Lincoln at RAF Spilsby, Lincolnshire. The New Zealand squadron had received just three aircraft prior to VJ Day, and was disbanded quickly thereafter.

In the postwar climate, the Lincoln quickly equipped the bomber squadrons of the RAF. Nearly 600 Lincolns were constructed to equip 29 RAF squadrons, the majority of which were based in the United Kingdom. They were supplemented and partially replaced by 88 Boeing Washingtons, on loan from the USAF, which had longer range and could reach targets inside the Iron Curtain. Small numbers remained in use with 7, 83 and 97 Squadrons until the end of 1955, at which point the type was phased out, having been replaced by the first of the V bombers.

During the 1950s, RAF Lincolns participated in operations in Kenya against Mau-Mau insurgents. During this action, they were operated from Eastleigh. The Lincoln was also deployed to Malaya during the Malayan Emergency, where it was used against insurgents aligned to the Malayan Communist Party. In Malayan theatre, RAF Lincolns were operated from Changi Air Base and Tengah Air Base. In excess of 3,000 sorties were flown during their 7 1/2-year deployment, during which half a million pounds of bombs dropped, 85 per cent of the total bomb tonnage dropped during the Malayan emergency.

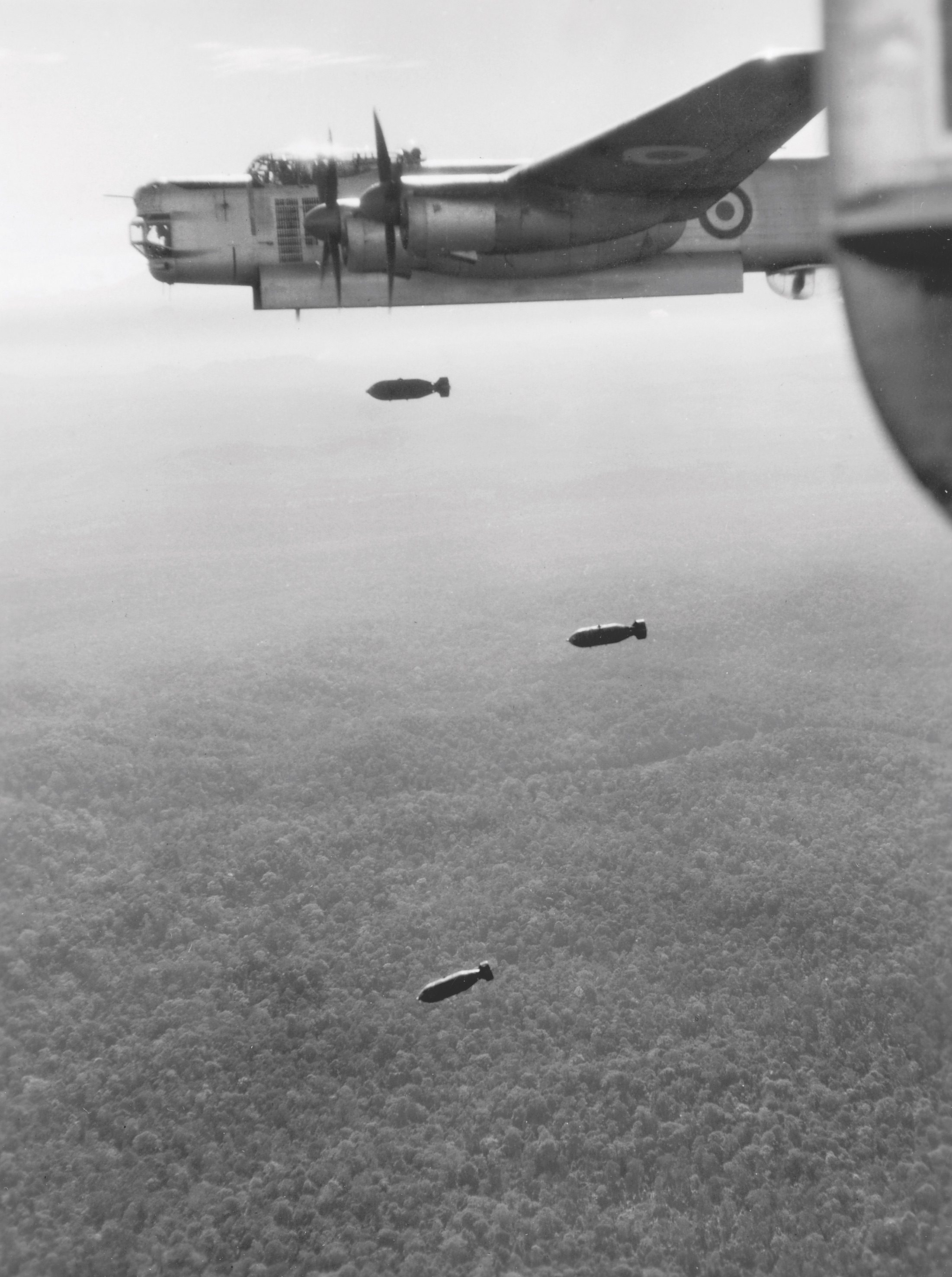
RAAF Lincoln bomber dropping 500 lb (230 kg) bombs on communist targets during the Malayan Emergency, c. 1954

On 12 March 1953, an RAF Lincoln (RF531 "C") of Central Gunnery School was shot down 20 mi (32 km) NE of Lüneburg, Germany, by several Soviet MiG-15s as it flew to Berlin on a radar reconnaissance flight, killing the seven crew members.

In November 1955, four Lincolns of 7 Squadron were detached for duties in British territories in the Middle East. In Bahrain, they carried out border patrols of the Trucial States at the time of the Buraimi dispute. When 7 Sqn was disbanded in December 1955, the four detached crews and aircraft became 1426 Flight, officially a photographic reconnaissance unit. It was later sent to Aden, carrying out patrols in the lead-up to the Aden Emergency.

As the RAF Lincolns became unserviceable, primarily due to wear and tear, they were replaced by jet-powered aircraft. The Lincolns of Bomber Command were phased out from the mid-1950s and had been replaced by jet bombers by 1963. The last Lincolns in RAF service were five operated by 151 Squadron, Signals Command, at RAF Watton, Norfolk, which were retired on 12 March 1963.

=== Royal Australian Air Force ===
From late 1946, Australian-built Lincolns began to equip 82 Wing, based at RAAF Base Amberley, Ipswich, Queensland. The type quickly replaced the Liberator bombers that had been operated by 12, 21 and 23 Squadrons. In February 1948, these units were renumbered 1, 2 and 6 Squadrons respectively; a fourth RAAF Lincoln squadron, 10 was formed on 17 March 1949 at RAAF Townsville as a reconnaissance unit.

During the 1950s, RAAF Lincolns participated in combat operations in Malaya, operating with the RAF. The RAAF based the B.Mk 30s of 1 Squadron at Tengah, for the duration of operations in Malaya. These Lincolns served with 10 Squadron RAAF at RAAF Base Townsville, Garbutt, Queensland; the discovery of corrosion in the wing spars led to the type's premature retirement in 1961. The Lincoln MR.Mk 31 was the final variant to see service in Australia.

=== Argentine Air Force ===
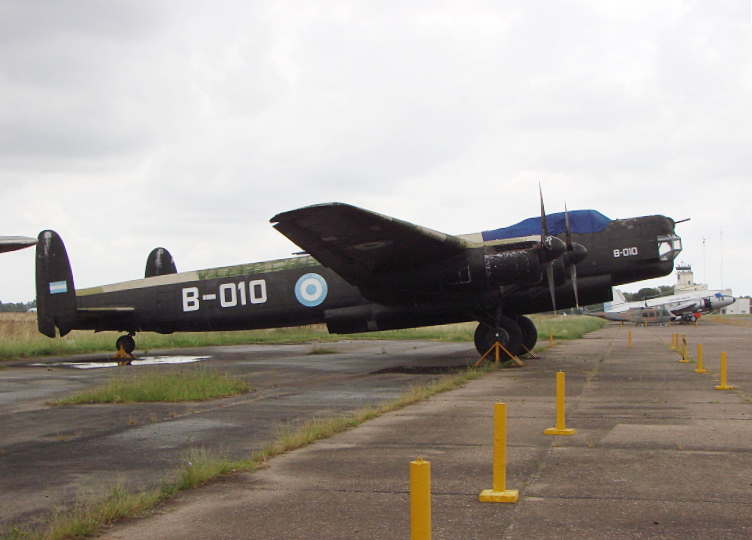
Argentine Air Force Lincoln B.2, preserved at the "National Aeronautics Museum", Argentina

From 1947, the Lincoln bomber served with the Fuerza Aerea Argentina; Argentina had procured a total of 30 Lincolns, eighteen newly built and twelve ex-RAF aircraft, and 15 secondhand Lancasters. The adoption of the Lincoln effectively gave Argentina the most powerful bombing force in South America. In 1947, the type entered service with I Grupo de Bombardeo of V Brigada Aérea. At the beginning of 1965, eleven of these remained in operational use; most of them were retired during the next year. In 1967 the last Lincolns were retired.

The Argentine aircraft were used in bombing missions against domestic rebels. Lincolns were deployed during an attempted military coup in September 1951; the type was also used by both the government and rebel forces during the 1955 Revolución Libertadora coup which deposed Argentine President Juan Perón.

Argentine Lincolns were also used to conduct supply airdrops in support of Argentine operations in the Antarctic region. In 1948, one of the bombers was returned to Avro for modification at RAF Langar in Nottinghamshire to allow it to operate these Antarctic support flights; the changes included the addition of Lancastrian nose and tail cones, additional fuel tanks, and removal of armament; the aircraft became the first Avro Lincolnian. With these modifications the aircraft received a civilian registration and was named Cruz del Sur; it undertook its first aerial supply flight to the Antarctic San Martín Base in December 1951.

== Use in aero-engine research ==
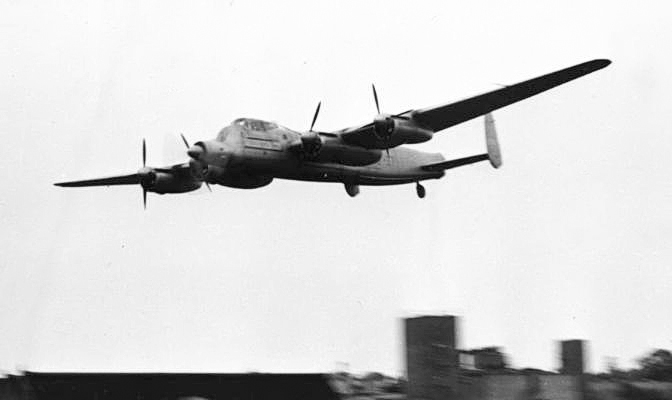
Avro Lincoln testbed G-37-1 at the Farnborough SBAC Show in 1956, flying solely on its nose-mounted Rolls-Royce Tyne

Lincolns were frequently employed as testbeds in new jet engine development. RF403, RE339/G and SX972 flew with a pair of Armstrong Siddeley Python turboprops outboard in place of the Merlins, and was used for the ballistic casing drop-test programme for the Blue Danube atomic weapon. SX972 was further modified to fly with a pair of Bristol Proteus turboprops. RA716/G had a similarly placed pair of Bristol Theseus turboprops and later also flew with Rolls-Royce Avon turbojets replacing the pair of turboprops. Lincoln Test Bed RF530 kept its Merlins but had a Napier Naiad turboprop in the nose. It later flew, bearing the civilian "Class B" test registration G-37-1, with a similarly placed Rolls-Royce Tyne which it displayed at the 1956 Society of British Aircraft Constructors (SBAC) show, making a low level flypast on just the nose Tyne, the four Merlins being shut down and propellers feathered.SX973 had a Napier Nomad diesel turbo-compound installed in a similar nose-mounted installation. RA643 flew with a Bristol Phoebus turbojet in the bomb bay, and SX971 had an afterburning Rolls-Royce Derwent mounted ventrally.

== Commercial service ==
A pair of Lincoln IIs were operated by D. Napier & Son Ltd. for icing research from 1948 to 1962. A transport conversion of the Lincoln II, using the streamlined nose and tail cones of the Lancastrian and a ventral cargo pannier was known as the Avro 695 Lincolnian.

One Lincoln Freighter Mk.2 G-ALPF, former RAF RE290, converted by Airflight Ltd. was used on the Berlin Air Lift by Surrey Flying Services Ltd.

Four Lincolnian conversions by Field Aircraft Services for use as meat haulers in Paraguay were not delivered, and subsequently scrapped.

== Variants ==
Avro Type 694
Prototypes to Air Ministry Specification 14/43, three-built
Lincoln I
Long-range bomber version for the RAF. Powered by four 1,750 hp (1,305 kW) Rolls-Royce Merlin 85 inline piston engines.
Lincoln II
Long-range bomber version for the RAF. Powered by four Rolls-Royce Merlin 66, 68A and 300 inline piston engines. Built by Avro, Armstrong-Whitworth and Vickers-Metropolitan.
Lincoln III
The Lincoln III was intended to be a maritime reconnaissance, anti-submarine warfare aircraft. The aircraft later became the Avro Shackleton.
Lincoln IV
Lincoln II converted to Merlin 85 power.
Lincoln U.5
Lincoln II converted to drone aircraft, only two aircraft modified.
Lincoln Mk 15 (B Mk XV)
This designation was given to one aircraft, built by Victory Aircraft in Canada.
Lincoln Mk 30
Long-range bomber version for the RAAF.
Lincoln Mk 30A
Long-range bomber version for the RAAF, fitted with a longer nose and Australian manufactured Merlin 102s.
Lincoln Mk 31 (GR 31)
General reconnaissance version of Mk.30 for the RAAF, fitted with a longer nose. Four Rolls-Royce Merlin 85 or 1,650 h.p. Merlin 102 powerplants.
Lincoln MR 31
Anti-submarine warfare/maritime reconnaissance version of Mk 31 for the RAAF.
Avro 695 Lincolnian
Transport derivative similar to the Avro Lancastrian
Lincoln ASR.3
Initial designation of the Avro Shackleton, which was based on the Lincoln.

== Operators ==
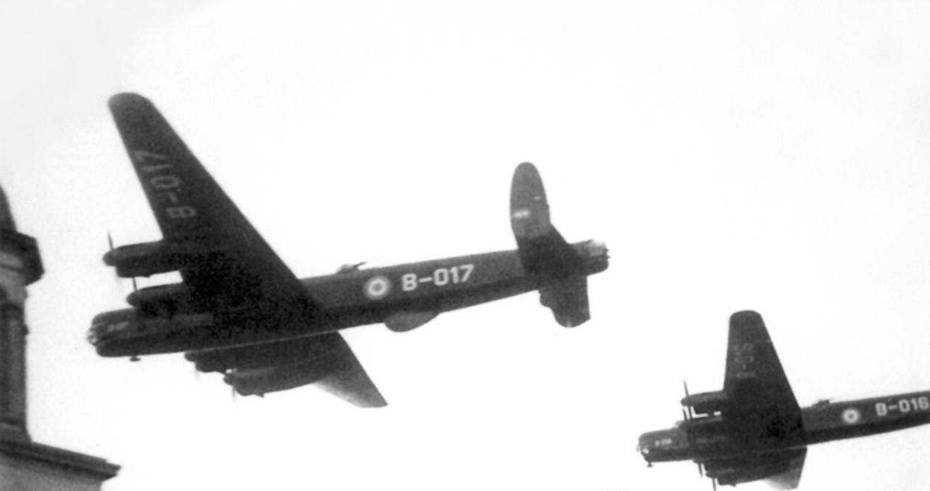
Several Argentinian Lincoln bombers flying in close formation, circa 1950

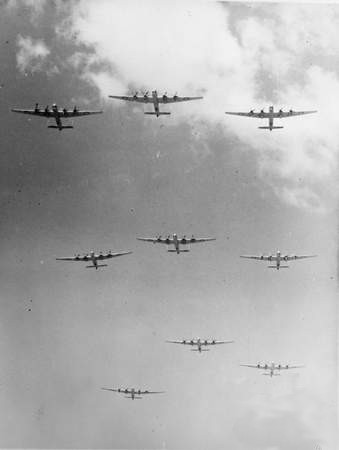
A formation of nine Australian Lincolns, 1953

Argentina

- Argentine Air Force
  - I Grupo de Bombardeo of V Brigada Aerea.
  - Fuerza Aerea de Tareas Antarticas (FATA)

Australia

- Royal Australian Air Force – 54 Avro Lincolns were in service with the RAAF from 1946 to 1961.
  - No. 1 Squadron RAAF
  - No. 2 Squadron RAAF
  - No. 6 Squadron RAAF
  - No. 10 Squadron RAAF
  - No. 12 Squadron RAAF (redesignated No. 1 Squadron in 1948)
  - Heavy Bomber Crew Conversion Unit RAAF
  - Lincoln Conversion Flight RAAF

Canada

- Royal Canadian Air Force
  - Three Avro Lincolns were in service with the RCAF from 1946 to 1948.

United Kingdom

- Royal Air Force
  - No. 7 Squadron RAF 1949–55 at RAF Upwood.
  - No. 9 Squadron RAF 1946–52 at RAF Binbrook, then converted to the English Electric Canberra.
  - No. 12 Squadron RAF 1946–52 at RAF Binbrook and RAF Hemswell, converted to the English Electric Canberra.
  - No. 15 Squadron RAF 1947–50 at RAF Wyton, converted to the Boeing Washington.
  - No. 35 Squadron RAF 1949–50 at RAF Mildenhall.
  - No. 44 Squadron RAF 1945–51 at RAF Mildenhall and RAF Wyton, converted to the Boeing Washington.
  - No. 49 Squadron RAF 1949–55 at RAF Upwood, RAF Waddington and RAF Wittering.
  - No. 50 Squadron RAF 1949–51 at RAF Waddington.
  - No. 57 Squadron RAF 1945–51 at RAF West Kirby, RAF Elsham Wolds, RAF Scampton, RAF Lindholme and RAF Waddington, converted to the Boeing Washington.
  - No. 58 Squadron RAF 1951 at RAF Benson and RAF Wyton
  - No. 61 Squadron RAF 1946–54 at RAF Waddington and RAF Wittering, converted to the English Electric Canberra.
  - No. 75 (New Zealand) Squadron RAF 1945 at RAF Spilsby.
  - No. 83 Squadron RAF 1945–55 at RAF Coningsby and RAF Hemswell.
  - No. 90 Squadron RAF 1947–50 at RAF Wyton, converted to the Boeing Washington.
  - No. 97 Squadron RAF 1946–55 at RAF Coningsby and RAF Hemswell.
  - No. 100 Squadron RAF 1946–54 at RAF Lindholme, RAF Hemswell, RAF Waddington and RAF Wittering, converted to the English Electric Canberra.
  - No. 101 Squadron RAF 1946–51 at RAF Binbrook, converted to the English Electric Canberra.
  - No. 115 Squadron RAF 1949–50 at RAF Mildenhall.
  - No. 116 Squadron RAF 1952–54 at RAF Watton
  - No. 138 Squadron RAF 1947–60 at RAF Wyton and RAF Scampton.
  - No. 148 Squadron RAF 1950–55 at RAF Upwood.
  - No. 149 Squadron RAF 1949–50 at RAF Mildenhall.
  - No. 151 Squadron RAF 1962–63 at RAF Watton
  - No. 192 Squadron RAF 1951–53 at RAF Watton
  - No. 199 Squadron RAF 1951–57 at RAF Watton and RAF Hemswell, converted to the Vickers Valiant
  - No. 207 Squadron RAF 1949–50 at RAF Mildenhall.
  - No. 214 Squadron RAF 1950–54 at RAF Upwood.
  - No. 230 Operational Conversion Unit RAF 1949–1953 at RAF Lindholme and RAF Upwood, became the Bomber Command Bombing School
  - No. 527 Squadron RAF 1952–57 at RAF Watton
  - No. 617 Squadron RAF 1946–52 at RAF Watton, converted to the English Electric Canberra.
  - No. 1321 Flight RAF 1954–58 at RAF Hemswell
  - No. 1426 Flight RAF 1956–57 at RAF Khormaksar
  - No. 1689 Flight RAF 1951–52 at RAF Aston Down
  - Bomb Ballistic Unit 1947–48 at RAF Woodbridge
  - Bomber Command Bombing School (BCBS) 1952–1960 at RAF Scampton and RAF Lindholme, converted to the Handley Page Hastings
  - Central Navigation and Control School 1951–55 at RAF Shawbury
  - Coastal Command Gunnery School 1955 at RAF Leconfield
  - Empire Air Navigation School 1947–48 at RAF Shawbury
  - Empire Air Navigation School 1946–50 at RAF Manby
  - Empire Central Flying School 1945–46 at RAF Hullavington
  - Empire Radio School 1947–50 at RAF Debden
  - Radar Research Flight 1951–57 at RAF Wyton
- Flight Refuelling Ltd (FRL) – used some converted as tankers for flight refuelling
- Empire Test Pilots School

== Aircraft on display ==
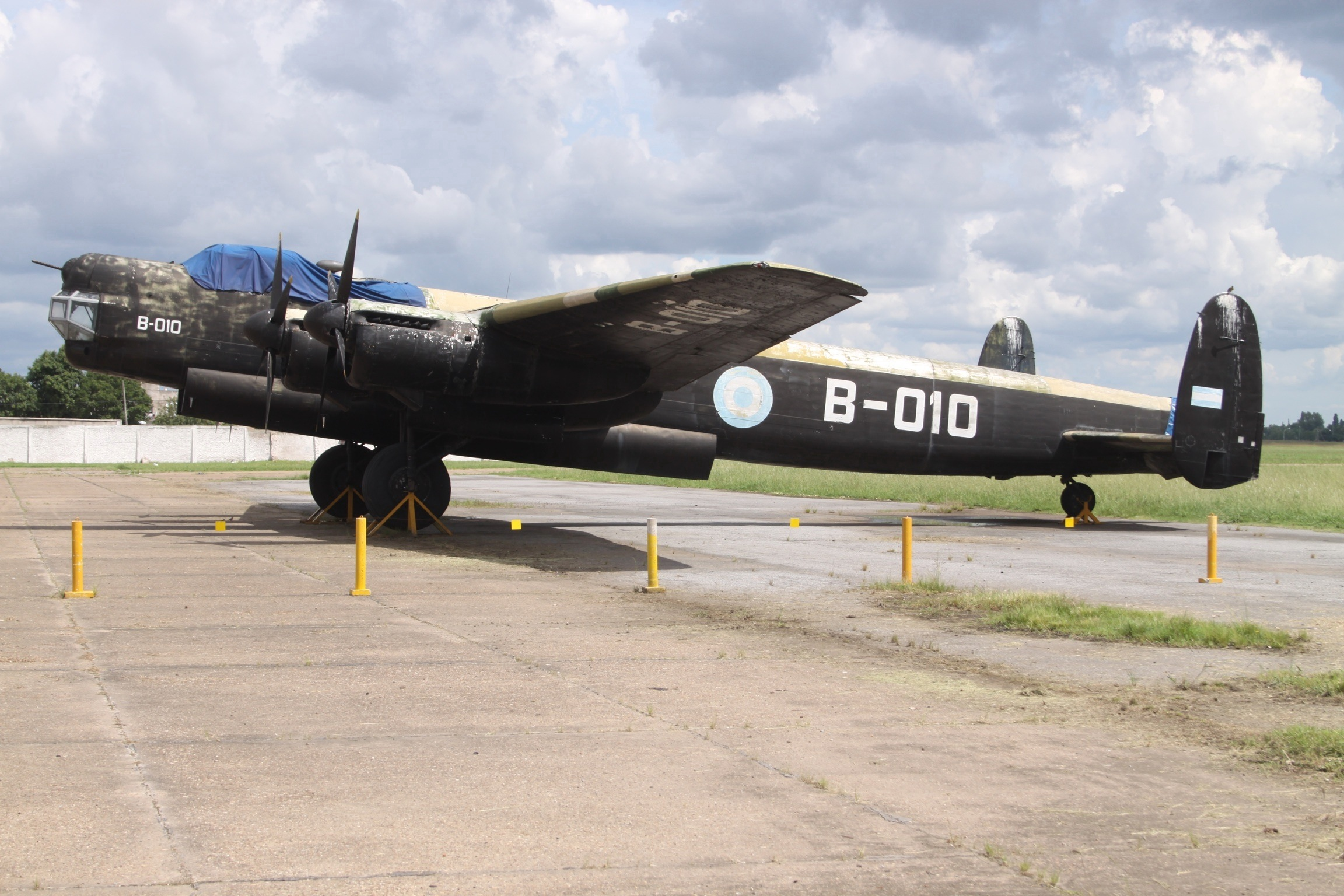
Argentine Air Force Lincoln B.2, National Museum of Aeronautics

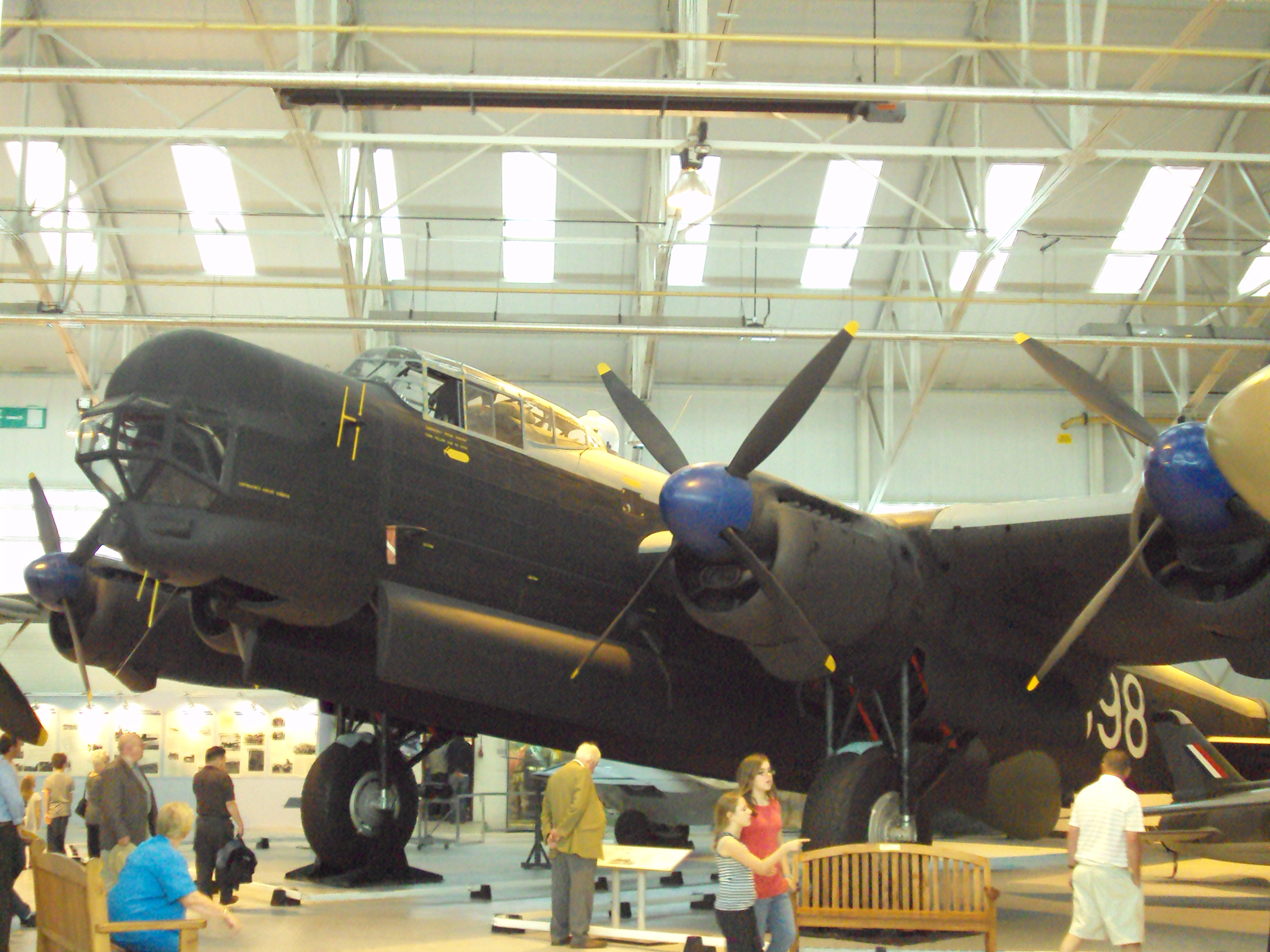
A preserved RAF Lincoln on static display at RAF Museum Cosford, Shropshire, 2010

- Argentina
  - Lincoln II B-004 – on display as B-010 at the National Museum of Aeronautics, Buenos Aires.
  - Lincoln II B-016 – at the Villa Reynolds Air Base, San Luis Province, as part of the Museum of the 5th ("V") Air Brigade (Spanish: Museo V Brigada Aérea).
- Australia
  - Lincoln II RF342 is being restored as a B.30 at the Australian National Aviation Museum, Melbourne.
  - The nose section of Australian-made Lincoln B.30 A73-27 is at the Camden Museum of Aviation at Narellan, New South Wales.
- United Kingdom
  - Lincoln II RF398 On display at the Royal Air Force Museum Cosford.

== Specifications (Lincoln I) ==
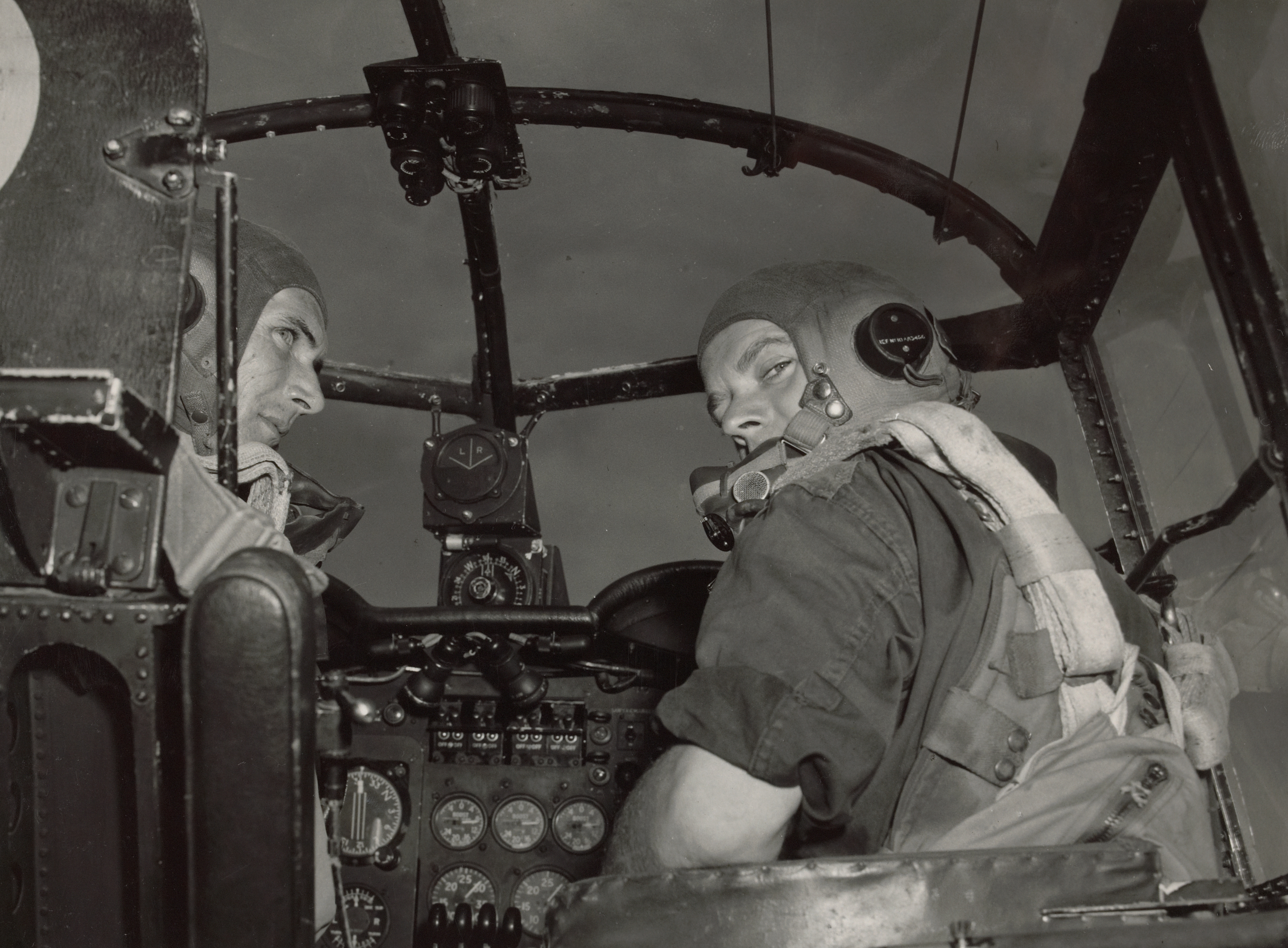
Cockpit of an Avro Lincoln

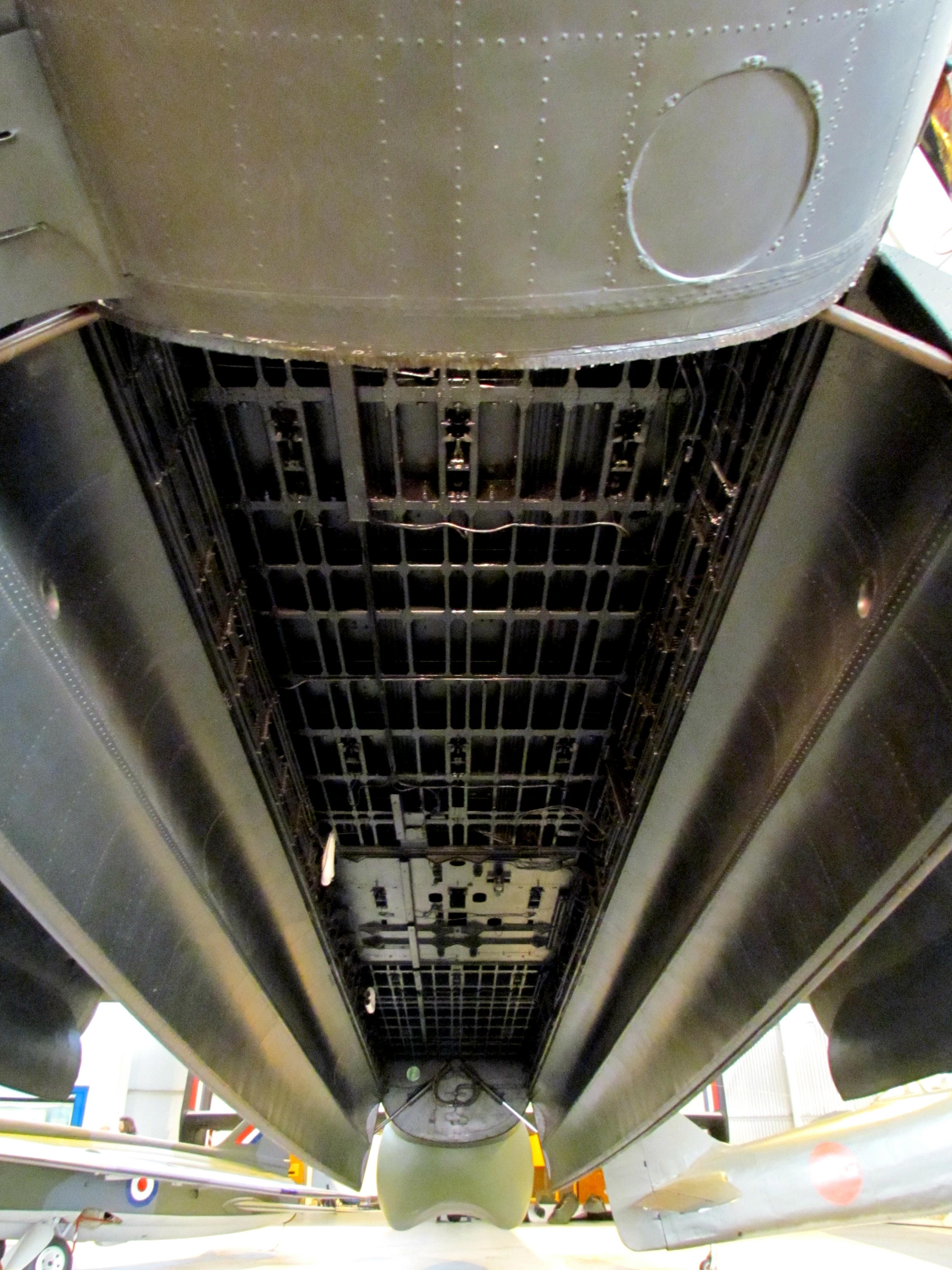
Bomb bay of a preserved Lincoln

Data from Jane's all the World's Aircraft 1947, Aircraft of the Royal Air Force 1918,

General characteristics

- Crew: 7 or 8 (pilot, flight engineer/co-pilot, navigator, wireless operator, front gunner/bomb aimer, dorsal and rear gunners)
- Length: 78 ft 3 1/2 in (23.86 m)
- Wingspan: 120 ft (37 m)
- Height: 17 ft 3 1/2 in (5.27 m)
- Wing area: 1,421 sq ft (132.0 m^{2})
- Airfoil: root: NACA 23018; tip: NACA 23012
- Empty weight: 44,188 lb (20,043 kg) equipped
- Gross weight: 75,000 lb (34,019 kg)
- Max takeoff weight: 82,000 lb (37,195 kg) (Note: Using the Merlin 102 engine, an RAAF Lincoln was able to take off in 2,874 ft (876 m) with an all-up weight of 82,000 lb (37 t). A lightened Lincoln, using Merlin 114 engines, and carrying a rocket-assisted bomb similar in size and weight to a 12,000 lb (5.4 t) Tallboy bomb, was able to achieve 42,000 ft (13 km).)
- Fuel capacity: 3,580 imp gal (4,300 US gal; 16,300 L) in 6 wing tanks; Oil 150 imp gal (180 US gal; 680 L) in four nacelle tanks
- Powerplant: 4 × Rolls-Royce Merlin 85 or Packard-Merlin 68 V-12 liquid-cooled piston engines, 1,750 hp (1,300 kW) each
- Propellers: 4-bladed Rotol or de Havilland Hydromatic, 13 ft 0 in (3.96 m) diameter fully-feathering propellers

Performance

- Maximum speed: 310 mph (500 km/h, 270 kn) at 18,300 ft (5,600 m)
- Cruise speed: 215 mph (346 km/h, 187 kn) at 20,000 ft (6,100 m)
- Stall speed: 75 mph (121 km/h, 65 kn) flaps and undercarriage extended
- Range: 2,800 mi (4,500 km, 2,400 nmi) at 15,000 ft (4,600 m) with 14,000 lb (6,400 kg) bomb load at 200 mph (170 kn; 320 km/h).

4,450 mi (3,870 nmi; 7,160 km) at 15,000 ft (4,600 m) with 3,000 lb (1,400 kg) bomb load at 200 mph (170 kn; 320 km/h).
2,240 mi (1,950 nmi; 3,600 km) at 20,000 ft (6,100 m) with 14,000 lb (6,400 kg) bomb load at 260 mph (230 kn; 420 km/h).
3,560 mi (3,090 nmi; 5,730 km) at 20,000 ft (6,100 m) with 3,000 lb (1,400 kg) bomb load at 260 mph (230 kn; 420 km/h).

- Service ceiling: 30,500 ft (9,300 m)
- Rate of climb: 800 ft/min (4.1 m/s)
- Time to altitude: 20,000 ft (6,100 m) in 26 minutes 30 seconds
- Wing loading: 52.77 lb/sq ft (257.6 kg/m^{2})
- Power/mass: 12.2 lb/hp (7.4 kg/kW)

Armament

- Guns:
  - 2x 0.5 in (12.70 mm) M2 Browning machine-guns nose turret (Note: Boulton Paul Type F turret)
  - 2x 20 mm (0.787 in) Hispano MK.IV cannon or Hispano Mk.V cannon dorsal turret (Note: Bristol B.17 turret)
  - 2x 0.5 in (12.70 mm) M2 Browning machine-guns tail turret (Note: Boulton Paul Type D turret.)

(Some aircraft fitted with a single 0.5 in (12.70 mm) M2 Browning in a ventral position)

- Bombs: Up to 14,000 lb (6,400 kg) of bombs; exceptionally 1 x 22,000 lb (10,000 kg) Grand Slam Deep Penetration bomb.

== See also ==
Related development

- Avro Lancaster
- Avro Tudor
- Avro Shackleton

Aircraft of comparable role, configuration, and era

- Boeing B-29 Superfortress
- Boeing B-50 Superfortress
- Consolidated B-32 Dominator
- Heinkel He 277
- Messerschmitt Me 264
- Tupolev Tu-4
- Vickers Windsor

Related lists

- List of aircraft of the Royal Air Force
