= Handley Page HP.100 =

Type of aircraft

HP.100

General information
- Type: Reconnaissance aircraft
- Manufacturer: Handley Page
- Status: Cancelled
- Primary user: Royal Air Force

The Handley Page HP.100 was a tendered submission to build a long-range, high-speed reconnaissance aircraft for the Royal Air Force, able to overfly Soviet territory in the face of anti-aircraft defences, and to supply information for the V bomber force carrying nuclear weapons.

The operational requirement, OR.330, specified an unarmed radar-equipped aircraft capable of cruising in excess of Mach 2, able to reach Mach 3, and having a range of around 5,000 mi (8,050 km). Handley Page, English Electric, Shorts, Vickers and Avro each supplied designs for consideration. In 1955, the contract was awarded to the Avro 730 and work on the HP.100 stopped with a partial mockup.

The high-speed reconnaissance project, including the Avro 730, was cancelled in 1957.

== Specification ==
Handley Page's design had a delta wing with canard foreplanes, and was powered by 12 small turbojets in a fairing below the leading edge of the wing.

- Length: 185 ft (56.4 m)
- Wingspan: 59.3 ft (18.1 m)

== See also ==
Aircraft of comparable role, configuration, and era

- Avro 730
- English Electric P.10
