= Avro 730 =

Type of aircraft

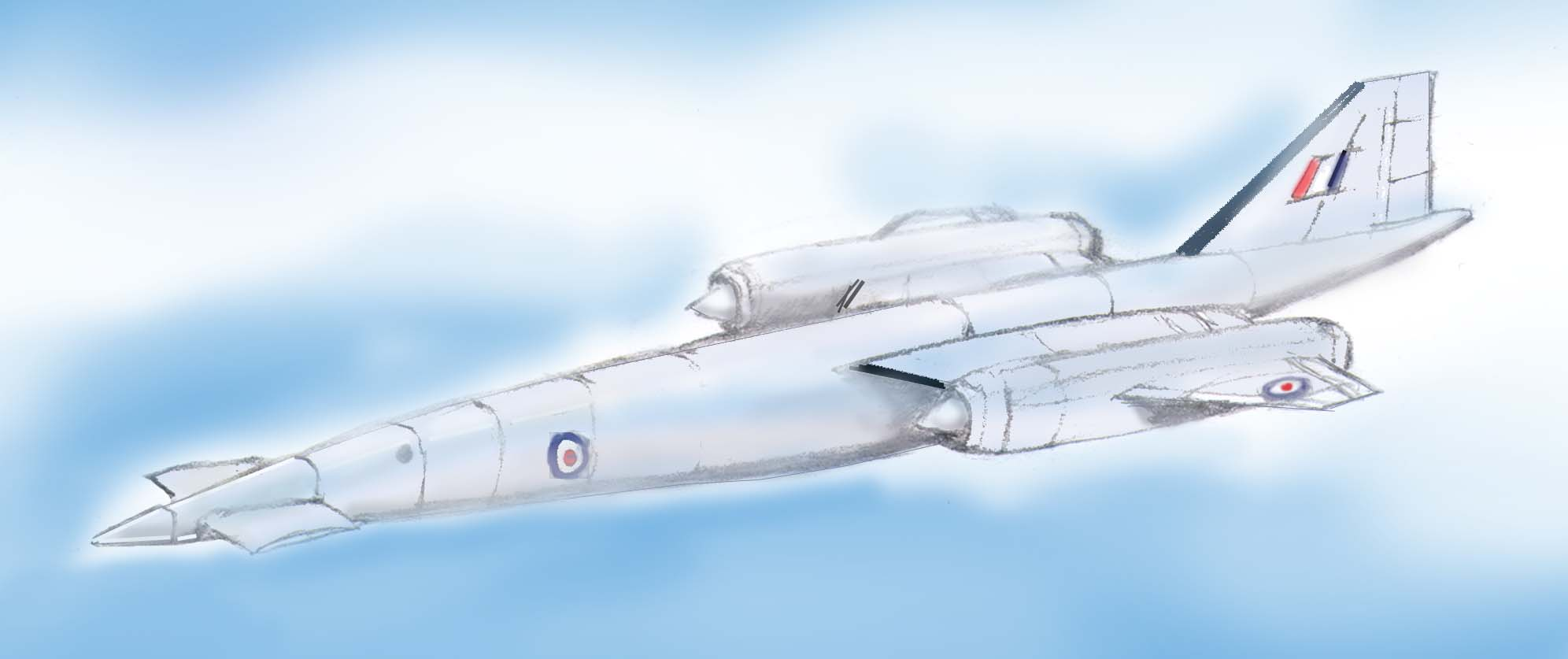
- Artist's concept

General information
- Type: Reconnaissance aircraft, strategic bomber
- Manufacturer: Avro Aircraft
- Status: Proposed design

History
- Retired: 1957 (cancellation)

The Avro 730 was a planned Mach 3 reconnaissance aircraft and strategic bomber that was being developed by Avro Aircraft for the Royal Air Force (RAF). It had been originally envisioned as a very high-speed aircraft to perform aerial reconnaissance missions, conforming with the requirements of Air Ministry Specification OR.330. Avro subsequently decided to modify the design of the proposed 730 in order to accommodate its arming with nuclear weapons; this change therefore meant that the type would be able to perform the nuclear weapons delivery mission as well, which had been called for under Air Ministry Specification RB.156T which sought a high speed reconnaissance-bomber aircraft.

If the Avro 730 had proceeded into service, it would have replaced the V bombers as the primary airborne platform as a part of Britain's nuclear deterrent. In early 1957, the Avro 730 was abruptly cancelled, along with the development of a number of other crewed aircraft, as a consequence of the 1957 Defence White Paper. Part of the reason for the cancellation was the perception that by the time it would enter service, Soviet anti-aircraft capabilities would have improved to the point where it would not be able to succeed in its mission; a preference for missile development over crewed aircraft was another factor. A successor high-speed bomber flying at low level to evade radar would be developed to meet Air Ministry Specification GOR.339, designated as the BAC TSR-2; however, this too would be eventually cancelled.

== Development ==
=== Origins ===
Following the end of the Second World War and facing the threats of the newly emerging Cold War, the Royal Air Force (RAF) was keen to not only preserve but to strengthen its strategic capabilities. In particular, RAF Bomber Command sought to replace its inventory of wartime bombers with more capable models that would take advantage of the latest technologies, such as jet propulsion and nuclear weapons. During the late 1940s and early 1950s, an entirely new jet-powered bomber fleet comprising three aircraft, the Vickers Valiant, the Avro Vulcan, and Handley Page Victor, which were collectively known as the V-bombers, was developed and introduced to service with the RAF. The V-bombers were purpose-built to be armed with the first generation of Britain's nuclear weapons, designated as Blue Danube, and served as the airborne carriers of Britain's nuclear deterrence for many years.

Even as the V-bombers were being introduced, the RAF had identified a need for a very-long range supersonic strategic reconnaissance aircraft for the purpose of supporting the V bombers during their offensive mission. As such, the Air Staff set about formulating an Operational Requirement, and in 1954 Specification OR.330 was issued with the specified required performance attributes. The envisioned reconnaissance aircraft would be capable of successfully entering the airspace of the Soviet Union while avoiding the sophisticated hostile air defences. The aircraft would have to be capable of maintaining Mach 2.5 at an altitude of 60,000 ft (18,000 m), along with the ability to attain at least Mach 3 and operate at a maximum range of 5,754 mi (9,260 km). By operating at such a high altitude and speed, along with assorted advanced electronic systems on board, it was believed that the specified aircraft would be capable of evading the threats posed by Soviet interceptor aircraft and newly developed surface-to-air missiles.

Upon its issuing, Specification OR.330 effectively called for the most ambitious high-performance aircraft in the world. (Note: The famed SR-71, a plane of overall similar performance, originated at a meeting in 1958, several years after this OR."History of the Oxcart Program" (PDF). SP-1362. Burbank, CA: Lockheed Aircraft Corporation. 1 July 1968. Archived from the original (PDF) on 23 January 2017.) At the time, Britain lacked any operational combat aircraft capable of supersonic flight; as such, meeting the specification required industry to develop new aerodynamic theory, materials and propulsion systems. There were a total of three submissions from British aircraft manufacturers: the Handley Page HP.100, Vickers SP4, and the Avro Type 730. All were delta or needle shapes employing multiple engines, 12 on the HP.100, 16 mounted horizontally at the rear of the Vickers. Work on the HP.100 proceeded to a full-scale mockup and large-scale wind tunnel testing. However, in mid-1955, Avro were issued with a development contract by the Ministry of Supply.

=== Development work and repurposing ===
The Avro 730 was an unswept canard design, making extensive use of stainless steel and powered by four Armstrong Siddeley P.176 turbojet engines. As an aid to development, the Bristol Type 188 aircraft was built to test the compound-delta wing shape, and later, the effects of prolonged supersonic flight on metal. Up to 10 prototype aircraft were proposed, necessitated in part by a decision made part-way through the development process to give the aircraft a bombing capability.

The initial version of the aircraft had been intended strictly for the aerial reconnaissance role, using its "Red Drover" side-looking airborne radar to find targets for the V bomber force that would follow. As development progressed, it became clear that the radar could use a smaller antenna, which resulted in freeing up considerable internal space. In response, the RAF added a secondary bombing role for the type, with both the radar and a long bomb bay holding either a weapon or additional fuel. A high-speed bomber requirement was also being studied at the time, OR.336, so the two projects were combined in the new RB.156 requirement in October 1955. This led to the Avro 730 undergoing a fairly substantial redesign. Avro had anticipated this eventuality in their original submission.

The envisioned test program was to have been quite thorough, subjecting full-scale aircraft to the severe temperatures of Mach 2.5 flight in a purpose-built heat chamber. By the end of the flight testing phase, the prototypes had been scheduled to perform a total of 1,400 flight hours. The first prototype, which had received the internal designation Avro 731, a three-eighths scale aircraft for testing purposes, was scheduled to fly in 1959. A pair of Avro 731 prototypes were set to be built and flown in advance of the full-scale prototypes.

The first prototype was under construction when the air minister, Duncan Sandys, announced the decision to cancel its development in 1957. It was suspected that by the time the aircraft came into service a decade later it would have been vulnerable to Soviet advances in anti-aircraft missile technology. Effort was instead transferred to the Blue Streak medium-range ballistic missile, while the sole 730 test fuselage was cut up. The Bristol 188 project continued despite the cancellation of the 730. Aspects and influences of the Avro 730 encouraged studies at the Royal Aircraft Establishment, Farnborough, into supersonic transport aircraft, which in turn eventually contributed to the development effort behind Concorde.

== Design ==
The Avro 730 was originally designed solely for aerial reconnaissance purposes. In order to achieve the desired high speed performance, the aircraft consisted of a long, slender fuselage with a high fineness ratio and a small, tapered, almost rectangular wing that was mounted centrally on the fuselage. The wing's relative shortness and straightness allowed the long aerial for the primary reconnaissance sensor, the Red Drover X-band radar, to be contained within the fuselage. A total of four Armstrong-Siddeley P.156 engines, mounted two apiece in an over-under arrangement of pods positioned at the extreme tips of the wings, provided propulsion. The engine nacelles included variable-geometry air intakes, while the engines themselves were equipped with convergent-divergent nozzles. Alternative arrangements of two or three shock cones could have been installed on the nacelles.

The aircraft adopted a canard configuration; this approach had the effect of greatly reducing trim drag while also generating increased lift at slower speeds. Pitch control was provided by trailing edge elevators on the nose-mounted tail plane; roll control was enacted by ailerons located on the wing's trailing edge, and yaw control was achieved by a conventional rudder. All four primary flight control surfaces were actuated by a quadruple-redundant electro-hydraulic control unit designed by Boulton Paul. Fly-by-wire electrical controls and automatic control systems were also to be employed on the type. The undercarriage, designed by Dowty Group, used an arrangement of a single centre-fuselage main unit with four wheels, a nose unit with two wheels, and a pair of outriggers located on the engine nacelles.

The Avro 730 lacked a conventional canopy in order to maintain the fineness ratio. The cockpit featured only two small windows facing to the side. On the intended initial development models, a raised canopy would have been present for direct vision; however, production aircraft would have made sole use of an electrically operated retractable periscope in order to provide an external view, particularly during take-off and landing. As originally envisioned, a crew of three would be carried: pilot, navigator and radar operator. All three were to be contained within the same compartment, which was both pressurised and refrigerated for passenger comfort; lightweight ejection seats were to be provided for all crew members. Due to features such as the automatic flight controls and stabilisation systems, the pilot was intended to be capable of supervising some of the aircraft's engineering functions as well, such as the control system, cooling and fuel systems.

Cooling was a critical issue for the Avro 730; at Mach 2, the external skin was anticipated to reach 190 °C; this would rise to 277 °C at Mach 2.7. Much of the aircraft was to be composed of a stainless steel brazed-honeycomb structure. Fuel onboard had the additional role of serving as a heat sink, and a fully duplicated freon-based refrigeration system provided by Normalair was also present.

During development, the Avro 730 underwent redesign work so that it could perform as a bomber as well as a reconnaissance platform. Although the new version looked like the original, it was larger overall and featured a new wing planform. In order to increase wing area, extra "winglettes" were added outboard of the engine pods and the entire planform was re-shaped to be more of a classic delta wing. The wing inboard of the engine pods, about two-thirds of the overall span, was swept at about 45°; the smaller area outboard of the engine was more highly swept at about 60°. The forward sweep on the trailing edge was removed. The engine pods were now specified to carry four Armstrong-Siddeley P.176 engines each, for a total of eight. The pods were circular at the front and mounted a single large shock cone, growing progressively more "square" to the rear, where they ended flush with the rear of the wing. Much of the layout was generally the same as the earlier version, with the rectangular canards, buried cockpit and large cropped-delta vertical fin at the rear.

In the new version, the crew was reduced to two. The bomb bay was narrow, but very long at 50 ft (15 m), and was intended to be armed with a nuclear-tipped stand-off missile. A suitable warhead had started development as Blue Rosette.

== Specifications ==
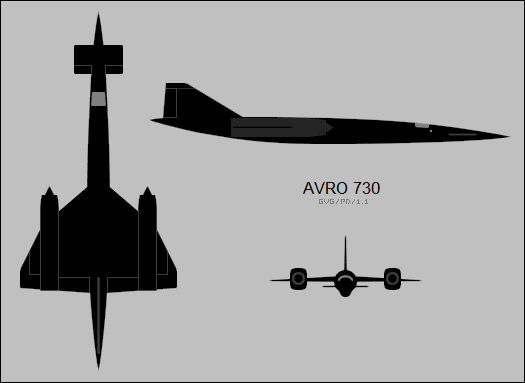
Orthographically projected diagram of the Avro 730.

Data from Spyplane: The U-2 History Declassified

General characteristics

- Crew: 3
- Length: 163 ft 6 in (49.83 m)
- Wingspan: 59 ft 9 in (18.21 m)
- Wing area: 2,000 sq ft (190 m^{2})
- Max takeoff weight: 220,000 lb (99,790 kg)
- Powerplant: 8 × Armstrong Siddeley P.176 afterburning turbojet engines, 9,700 lbf (43 kN) thrust each

Performance

- Maximum speed: 1,990 mph (3,200 km/h, 1,730 kn)
- Maximum speed: Mach 3
- Cruise speed: 1,250 mph (2,010 km/h, 1,090 kn) / M2.5
- Range: 5,754 mi (9,260 km, 5,000 nmi)
- Service ceiling: 66,400 ft (20,200 m)

== See also ==
- Operational Requirement F.155 - the planned opposition to the expected Soviet high flying supersonic attackers
- Rainbow Codes

Aircraft of comparable role, configuration, and era

- Lockheed A-12
- Bristol 188
- Handley Page HP.100
- North American XB-70 Valkyrie
- Sukhoi T-4

Related lists

- List of Air Ministry Specifications
