= Navigation and Bombing System =

Navigation system used in the Royal Air Force's V-bomber fleet

The Navigation and Bombing System, or NBS, was a navigation system used in the Royal Air Force's V-bomber fleet. Primary among its parts was the Navigation and Bombing Computer (NBC), a complex electromechanical computer that combined the functions of dead reckoning navigation calculation with a bombsight calculator to provide outputs that guided the aircraft and automatically dropped the bombs with accuracy on the order of a few hundred metres on missions over thousands of kilometres.

Inputs to the NBS system included late models of the H2S radar, the True Airspeed Unit, a gyrocompass and the Green Satin radar. A Mk 6 radar altimeter was used for accurate height measurement but was not connected to the NBC. These inputs were used to set the Ground Speed Unit, which carried out the navigation calculations, which in turn fed the autopilot system. The NBC did not feed the T4 bombsight computer for visual sighting.

The NBC was an electro-mechanical computer developed by EMI in the late 1940s and early 1950s. Besides navigational computation for position it was essential for automatic bombing computation. This was achieved with a calculator, Calc 3. This could calculate the square root of height above target using a square rooting pin wheel. Wheel with numerous pins which was rotated and had a pickoff that moved between centre to edge providing a voltage output. There was a height carriage which, when activated, could make or break a number of switches. Its operation was controlled by a cassette containing a 35mm file which represented the flight profile of different bombs. There were dark or clear areas similar to punch paper templates.

The output was the forward throw of a bomb in nautical miles which was calculated from the time of bomb fall and the groundspeed in knots. Additional factors such as the aircraft change in altitude and the bomb characteristics the time of bomb fall. These factors cause the bomb to trail behind the aircraft, this is the Trail Angle. As it trails behind the aircraft it is also subjected to wind effect for a greater time. The Trail Angle may be split into components along the flight line and across the flight line. The system time from the firing impulse to the bomb release is also factored in. Finally, if dropping a stick of bombs, a stick length of up to 1,400yds may be set. The system then calculates half this length. (Note: If the bomb aimer set the stick length on the computer at half the computer would be using only a quarter. Assuming a speed of about 420kts or 240yd/sec, and 21 bombs dropped at intervals of 0.3sec, the stick length would be 1440yd. If the value set was 720yd the first bomb would be released 360yd late.) This is represented by the formula:

$$FT = V_g  (\sqrt{2}h/g \pm \dot{h}/g + \tau + TA)-((h \times \tan \lambda) \times \cos \delta ) + SL/2$$

where:

$FT$ = forward travel in nautical miles,
$V_g$ = groundspeed in knots,
$h$ = height above target in feet,
$g$ = gravitational constant in feet,
$\dot{h}$ = the rate of change of height in feet per second,
$\tau$ = Tau, the symbol for the bomb characteristics or drag,
$TA$ = the extra time in seconds to allow for system delay,
$\lambda$ = Lambda or trail angle,
$\delta$ = Drift angle
$SL$ = Stick length
