= Green Satin radar =

Type of aircraft radar system

Green Satin, also known as ARI 5851, was a Doppler radar system developed by the Royal Air Force as an air navigation aid. The system provided direct measures of the drift speed and direction, and thereby allowed accurate calculation of the winds aloft. These values were then fed into the Navigation and Bombing System, which uses these values to continually calculate the current location using dead reckoning.

It was originally specified in 1949 as OR.3015 for the English Electric Canberra bomber. The first examples arrived in 1953, and it was soon fitted operationally. It was subsequently used on the V bomber fleet. It remained in use on the V-bombers until the Avro Vulcans 1969 when it was replaced by the Decca 72M. Handley Page Victors may have used it until they left service in 1993.

The name comes from an era when the Ministry of Supply used random combinations of colours and code words to prevent their code names being too literal. A version known as Blue Silk with lower top-speed limits was used in the Shackleton, some marks of Canberra and Royal Navy aircraft.

== Background ==
In air navigation there are six values of interest; airspeed, heading (the compass angle the nose is pointing), ground speed, course (the compass angle of the actual motion), wind speed and wind direction. Using any four of these values and basic vector addition, the other values can be determined through the wind triangle. Once determined, the path of the aircraft can be accurately calculated using dead reckoning in comparison to an original fixed point.

Airspeed and heading can be measured with a fair degree of accuracy using onboard measurements, namely the airspeed indicator and gyrocompass. Since the aircraft flies within the air mass, it is not possible to directly measure wind values, so their determination must be carried out with reference to some external measure. For most of the history of air navigation, this was accomplished through a reverse dead reckoning process, timing the passage of objects on the ground to measure ground speed, and either estimating the drift or measuring it with simple optical instruments like the drift meter. Both are inherently inaccurate, with the US Navy suggesting such measures are accurate to only 10%.

Green Satin provided accurate and immediate measurements of the true ground speed and the drift angle. Combined with the airspeed and heading, air navigation complexity was greatly reduced. However, accurate dead reckoning also requires an accurate original "fix" from which future movements are determined. In practice, Gee would be used to take a fix after the aircraft reached cruise altitude and speed, and would be used to fine-tune the navigation until it passed out of Gee range, perhaps 300 to 450 nautical miles.

== Development ==
Green Satin started life in Operational Requirement (OR) 3015 in 1949. This called for a device to provide an accurate measure of the groundspeed of an aircraft to within 0.2 percent while flying at any speed between 100 and 700 knots at all altitudes up to 60,000 feet. It also had to measure the drift angle up to 20 degrees on either side of the heading, with an accuracy of less than 0.1 degree. It had to make these measurements over land or water, in any weather.

The solution to measuring ground speed was already well understood at the time, using a Doppler radar system to compare the returned frequency of two or more signals. Green Satin used four such signals to determine both ground speed and drift angle. These were generated in a single transmitter and sent out simultaneously by a single cross-shaped antenna with feed horns at the four ends. In its neutral position, facing forward, one set of antennas sent out two signals aligned slightly fore and aft, and the other set slightly to the port and starboard side. On reception, each pair of signals was sent into a separate frequency comparator, with the output being the difference in frequencies represented by a voltage.

Consider an aircraft flying over the ground with no wind. In this case, the velocity to the side is zero, so the port and starboard signals will return to the aircraft at the same frequency. When sent through their comparator, the output is zero voltage, indicating no sideways drift. Now consider the case where the aircraft is being blown to the right. In this case, the starboard (right) signal will be shifted upwards in frequency and the port (left) signal downwards. The speed of the sideways movement is not of interest, only the angle. To measure the angle, the entire antenna array was mounted on a motorized pivot and rotated back and forth until the output was zero again.

Once the drift angle is accurately measured, the antenna will be pointing directly in the direction of the drift. Any difference in frequency between the fore and aft pointing signals at this point is thus a measure of the ground speed.

Green Satin was a pulsed system, although it was not a pulse-Doppler radar in the typical meaning. Pulses were used in order to allow a single antenna to be used for both broadcast and reception, not to measure distance (or in this case, altitude) through pulse timing. Frequencies were compared within a single pulse (a monopulse radar), so the high frequency stability over longer multi-pulse times was not required. Green Satin was thus based on a simple cavity magnetron generator, rather than the more frequency-stable solutions like the klystron.

The electronics were housed within two pressurized canisters mounted on large backplanes that included power supplies and various electrical connections. These were mounted above the cabin area on the rear bulkhead of the Canberra. Some of these maintained their pressurization decades after being decommissioned.

Data from the Green Satin was fed into the Navigation and Bombing System (NBS), a mechanical computer that calculated the current location of the aircraft through the continual dead reckoning of the inputs. Most of these inputs were automatically fed from various aircraft instruments, but Green Satin data was normally fed in manually. The output of the NBS was the calculated latitude and longitude based solely on airspeed and heading, the values from the Green Satin were then added to these to produce the final outputs in the navigation computer. These outputs also drove correction circuits in the H2S Mk. IX bombing radars and Mark XIV bomb sight to adjust the predicted bomb trajectories.

== Testing ==
In order to determine the operational accuracy of Green Satin, a lengthy series of test flights over land and water were carried out from an early Canberra. However, for these tests the G4B gyrocompass proved far too inaccurate as it required constant correction for drift. And while Gee was accurate enough for the purpose, taking a fix required lengthy manual calculation by the operator. The test program demanded additional equipment to solve both of these problems.

Accurate heading information was supplied by the Azimuth Datum Instrument (ADI), a star tracker mounted on a periscope so that it projected its display on a plate in front of the navigator. Using angle measurements similar to those taken with a sextant, the aircraft heading could be accurately determined. For initial position fixes, Gee was replaced with the Decca Navigator System (Mark 6), which directly output measurements on three dials.

By locating both the ADI and Decca output on the navigation console, along with the Green Satin outputs, a movie camera was able to record everything in real time for later data analysis on the ground. This consisted of taking a snapshot of the settings every six seconds and then averaging the instrument positions. Testing demonstrated that accuracy of Green Satin over land in straight and level flight was less than ±0.1% of distance flown, and less than ±0.1 of a degree in drift.

== In use ==
The Green Satin was initially used with a simple display system with two large dials presenting true ground speed in knots on the left, and drift angle on the right. The output from this system was typically sent, along with the G4 compass' output, to the Mark 4 Ground Position Indicator (GPI). The GPI was a simple mechanical computer that integrated the inputs to produce an offset from a user-provided initial location (taken from Gee, for instance), and presented this as either latitude and longitude or grid reference numbers on two odometer-like displays.

Green Satin initially equipped the Canberra force, but was soon used on most larger RAF aircraft. Problems locking on to a calm sea surface meant Decca navigational equipment had to be used instead during Grapple bomb aiming from Valiant aircraft.

== Other applications ==
Green Satin was also used in combination with a second radar system named Red Setter to produce a side looking airborne radar (SLAR) system. (Note: Lovell claims this was known as "Red Neck", but this name was for a different SLAR system.) This used the antenna and electronics from an H2S Mark IXA, but turned off the scanning motor so it normally pointed to one side of the aircraft. The drift angle from the Green Satin was fed into the motor to make minor adjustments to keep the antenna aligned at right angles to the aircraft's ground track, independent of the heading.

The CRT display used by the normal H2S was fitted with a film system with a motorized takeup reel. The motor was connected to the ground speed output of the Green Satin, so it drew the film across the front of the display at a speed proportional to groundspeed. With the scanning motor turned off, the display on the CRT was a single line, modulated in brightness by the returns at various distances from the aircraft. This exposed the film, producing a 2D image of the land to one side of the aircraft.

The film was pulled through a rapid developer system produced by Kelvin Hughes, who made similar systems for a variety of purposes. The film was processed and ready for viewing after a short delay.

== See also ==
- AN/APN-89, the US equivalent of Green Satin.
