= V bomber =

Multi-model class of strategic bombers

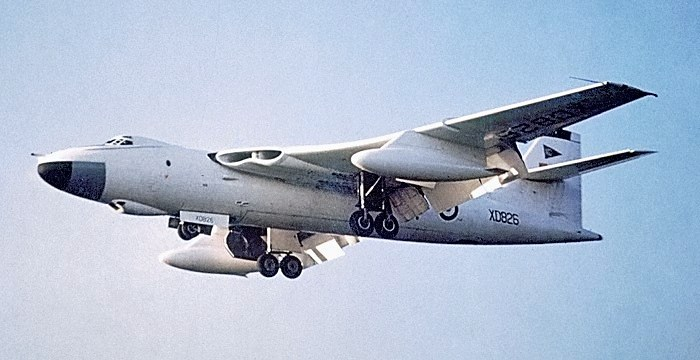
Vickers Valiant

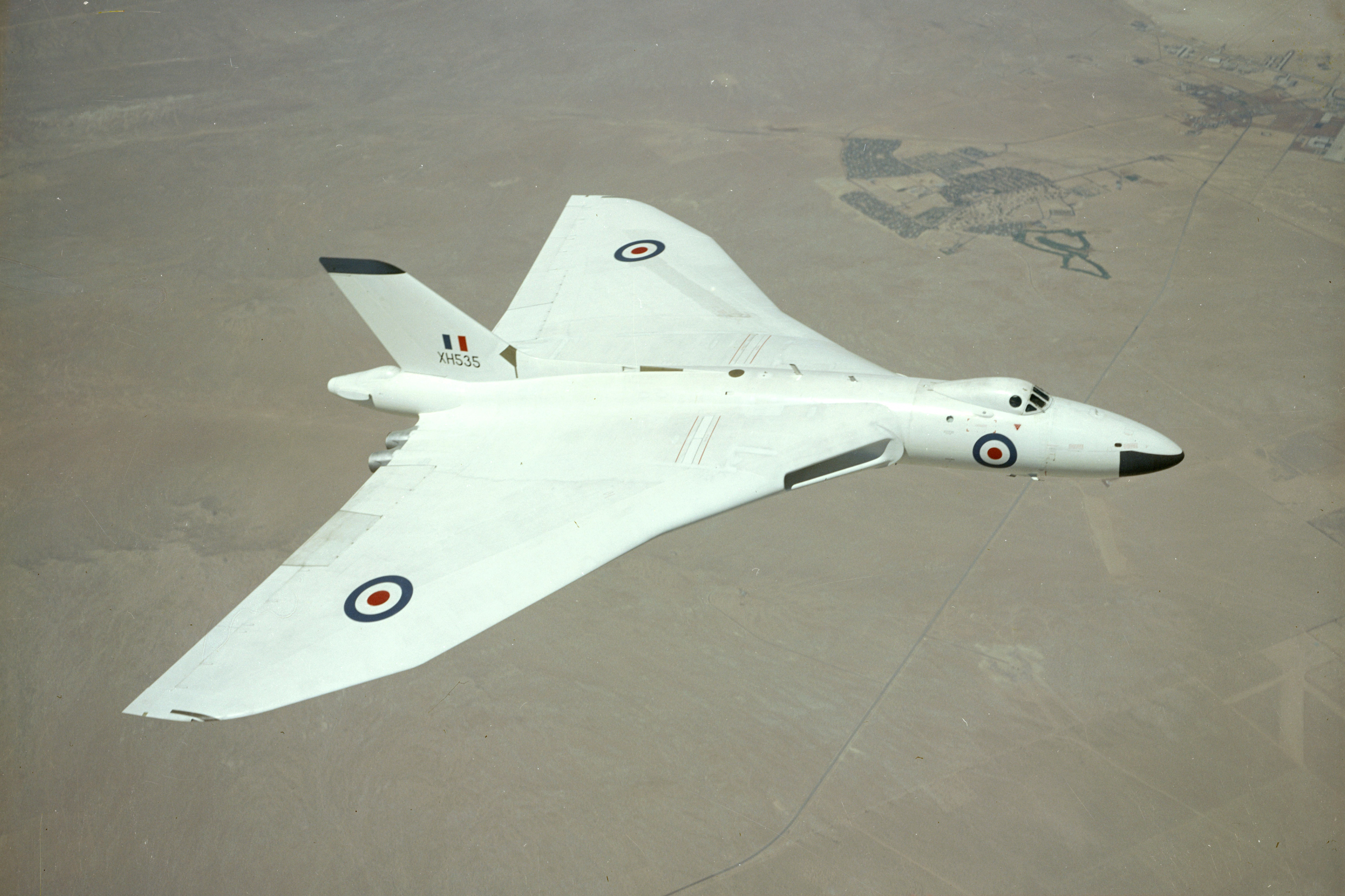
Avro Vulcan

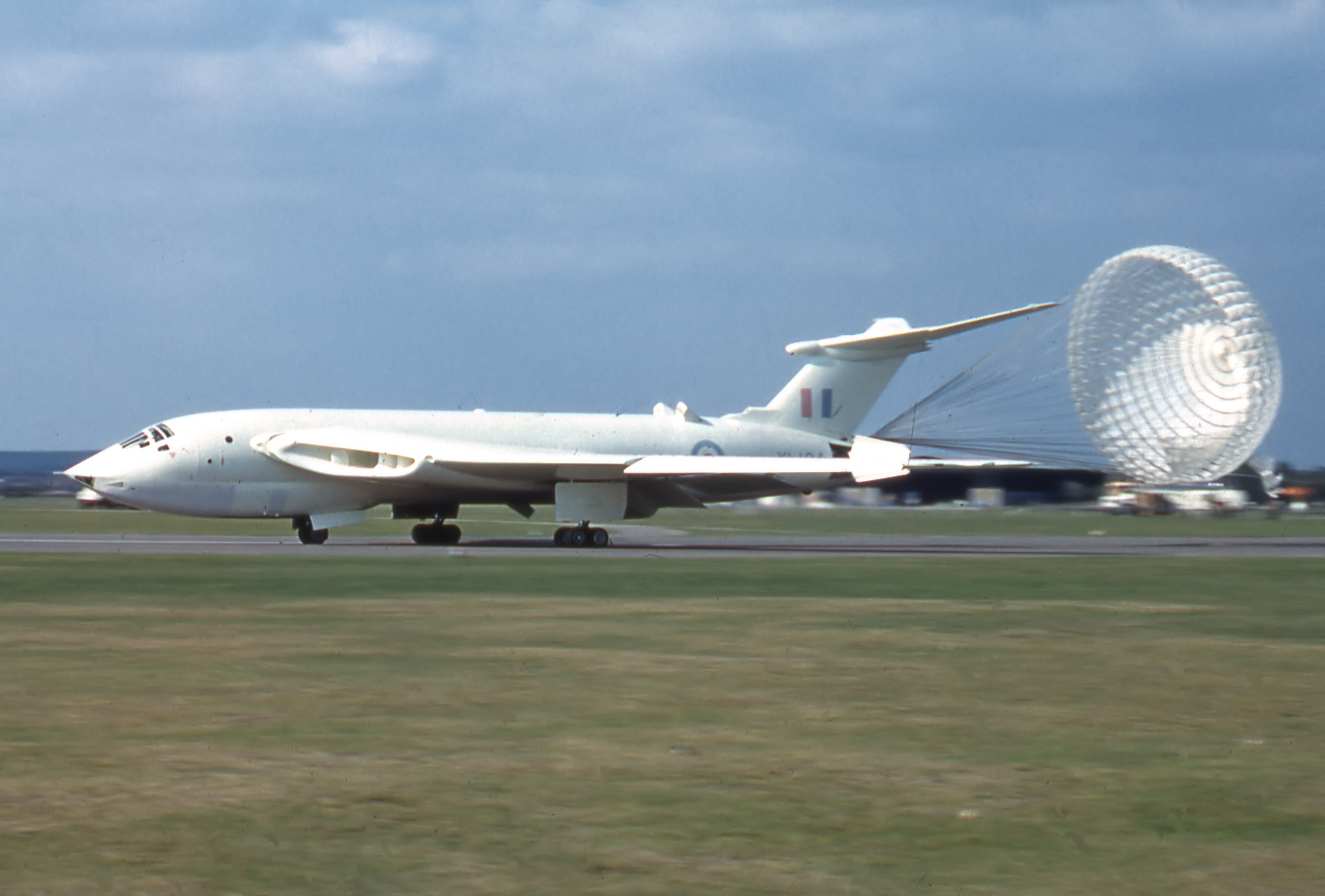
Handley Page Victor

The "V bombers" were the Royal Air Force (RAF) aircraft during the 1950s and 1960s that comprised the United Kingdom's strategic nuclear strike force known officially as the V force or Bomber Command Main Force. The three models of strategic bomber, known collectively as the V class, were the Vickers Valiant, which first flew in 1951 and entered service in 1955; the Avro Vulcan, which first flew in 1952 and entered service in 1956; and the Handley Page Victor, which first flew in 1952 and entered service in 1957. The V Bomber force reached its peak in June 1964 with 50 Valiants, 70 Vulcans and 39 Victors in service.

All eight British nuclear weapons that were ever detonated after being dropped from an aircraft (see Operation Buffalo and Operation Grapple) were dropped by Valiants of No. 49 Squadron RAF.

When it became clear that the Soviet Union's surface-to-air missiles like the S-75 Dvina could bring down high-flying aircraft, the V bomber force changed to low-level attack methods. Additionally the Blue Steel missile profile was changed to one of low level penetration and release. This reduced its range significantly. It was then planned to move to the much longer-ranged Skybolt air-launched ballistic missile. When the US cancelled Skybolt, the survivability of the V force was highly questionable. This led to the Royal Navy taking over the nuclear deterrent role from 1968, using UGM-27 Polaris submarine launched ballistic missiles launched from nuclear submarines. The tactical role passed to smaller aircraft like the SEPECAT Jaguar and Panavia Tornado.

The V bombers were also capable of dropping conventional weapons, supported by a complex analogue computer system known as the Navigation and Bombing System that allowed accurate bombing even over very long ranges. The Valiants were used during the Suez Crisis as conventional bombers. Victors and Vulcans were deployed to the Malay Archipelago as a deterrent during the Indonesia–Malaysia confrontation but were not used in missions. The Vulcan is well-remembered for its conventional Black Buck bombing raids during the 1982 Falklands War. To support such missions, tanker aircraft versions of all three designs were developed. Reconnaissance versions were produced, and other modifications were also made during their lifetime.

The Valiant was removed from service in 1964 after problems with metal fatigue of their wings became apparent; a planned low-level variant did not progress beyond the prototype. Usage of all V bombers as weapons platforms, nuclear or conventional, ended in 1982.

== Background ==
The Royal Air Force (RAF) Bomber Command ended the Second World War with a policy of using heavy four-piston-engined bombers for massed raids, and remained committed to this policy in the immediate post-war period. The RAF adopted the Avro Lincoln, an updated version of the wartime Avro Lancaster, as its standard bomber for this purpose. Production of the Lincoln continued after the war, and eventually 450 were built. Although touted as a mighty bomber in 1945, it lacked the range to reach targets in the Soviet Union, and would be vulnerable to the new jet fighters that were then under development.

Elements within the RAF and the government sought to adopt the new nuclear weaponry and advances in aviation technology to introduce more potent and effective means of conducting warfare. In November 1944, the UK Chiefs of Staff had requested a report from Sir Henry Tizard on potential future means of warfare. Reporting without knowledge of the progress of Allied efforts to produce an atomic bomb, in July 1945 the Tizard Committee urged the encouragement of large-scale atomic energy research. It foresaw the devastating effects of atomic weapons and envisaged high-flying jet bombers cruising at 500 mph (800 km/h) at 40,000 ft (12,000 m). It was thought that potential aggressors might be deterred by the knowledge that Britain would retaliate with atomic weapons if attacked.

Even at the time, there were those who could see that guided missiles would eventually make such aircraft vulnerable, but development of such missiles was proving difficult, and fast and high-flying jet bombers were likely to serve for years before there was a need for something better. Massed bombers were unnecessary if a single bomber could destroy an entire city or military installation with a nuclear weapon. It would have to be a large bomber, since the first generation of nuclear weapons were big and heavy. Such a large and advanced bomber would be expensive on a per-unit basis, as it would be produced in small quantities.

During the early part of the Second World War, Britain had a nuclear weapons project, codenamed Tube Alloys, which the 1943 Quebec Agreement merged with the American Manhattan Project. The British government trusted that the United States would continue to share nuclear technology, which it regarded as a joint discovery, after the war, but the United States Atomic Energy Act of 1946 (McMahon Act) ended technical co-operation. The British government saw this as a resurgence of United States isolationism, as had occurred after the First World War, and dreaded the possibility that Britain might have to fight an aggressor alone. It also feared that Britain might lose its great power status and its influence in world affairs. It therefore restarted its own nuclear weapons development effort, which was now codenamed High Explosive Research. The first British atomic bomb was tested in Operation Hurricane on 3 October 1952.

== Development ==
In November 1946, the Air Ministry issued an operational requirement (OR230) for an advanced jet bomber capable of carrying a 10,000-pound (4,500 kg) bomb to a target 2,000 nautical miles (3,700 kilometres) from a base anywhere in the world with a cruising speed of 500 knots (930 km/h) and at an altitude of between 35,000 and 50,000 feet (11,000 and 15,000 m). The bomb weight arose from an earlier operational requirement for an atomic bomb (OR1001), which specified a maximum weight of 10,000 pounds (4,500 kg). The speed and altitude requirements were based on what was thought necessary to penetrate enemy air defences. The aircraft itself was to weigh no more than 200,000 pounds (91,000 kg). The Ministry of Supply baulked, and initially refused to accept OR230. Calculations showed that such an aircraft would require a runway 2,000 yards (1,800 m) long. Bomber Command's runways were built to handle the Lancaster, and extending them would be an expensive undertaking, involving not only additional construction, but land acquisition and demolition works. OR230 would never be fulfilled, and was ultimately cancelled on 17 September 1952.

The Operational Requirements Committee met to discuss OR230 on 17 December 1946. This committee was chaired by the Vice-Chief of the Air Staff, Air Marshal Sir William Dickson, with Stuart Scott-Hall, the Principal Director of Technical Development (Air) representing the Ministry of Supply. The result was a new Operational Requirement (OR229) on 7 January 1947. This was much the same as OR230, but the range was cut to 1,500 nautical miles (2,800 km), and the weight reduced to 100,000 pounds (45,000 kg). OR229 formed the basis of an Air Ministry specification, B.35/46. A request for designs went to most of the United Kingdom's major aircraft manufacturers: Handley Page, Armstrong Whitworth, Avro, Bristol, Short Brothers and English Electric.

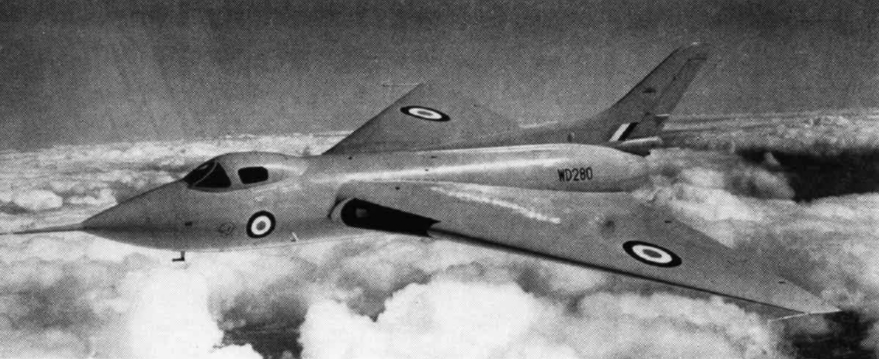
An Avro 707 in flight during 1951; this type was developed to test the tailless thick delta wing configuration chosen for the Avro Vulcan

On 30 April 1947, Armstrong Whitworth, Avro, English Electric and Handley Page were invited to submit formal design tenders. A tender design conference was held on 28 July 1947, and decided to order the design submitted by Avro, along with a small flying model to test its delta wing design. The conference also decided to investigate the crescent wing concept as insurance against the favoured delta wing design being a failure. The Handley Page and Armstrong Whitworth designs were both considered. The Ministry of Supply gave financial cover in the form of an Intention to Proceed (ITP) order to Avro in November 1947. An advisory committee selected the Handley Page design on 23 December 1947, and it too was given an ITP.

The 17 December 1946 meeting that came up with OR230 also decided to solicit bids for a more conservative design that could be put into service more quickly, and could act as further insurance against the failure of both of the more advanced designs. This was expressed in another operational requirement (OR239), from which an Air Ministry specification, B.14/46, was generated, which was issued on 11 August 1947. This had lower cruising altitude and speed requirements than B.35/46, but was otherwise identical. A design was put forward by Shorts, which was given an ITP in November 1947. The result was an extremely conservative design with straight wings, the Short Sperrin, which was in practice little more than a jet-powered Lincoln.

Meanwhile, Vickers-Armstrongs had produced a swept wing design, the Vickers 660. This had been rejected because it did not meet the B.35/46 specification; but the estimated performance of the Sperrin caused officials at the Air Ministry to take another look. A new specification, B.9/48, was drawn up, based on the Vickers-Armstrongs design, which was issued on 19 July 1948. An ITP was given to Vickers-Armstrongs in April 1948, followed by a contract for two prototypes in February 1949, whereas Shorts was only awarded a contract for two prototypes in February 1949. The first prototype Vickers 660 flew on 18 May 1951, three months before the first prototype Sperrin, which first flew on 10 August 1951. No longer required, the Sperrin was cancelled; only the two prototypes were built.

Vickers-Armstrongs named its aircraft the Vickers Valiant. Hitherto, bombers had been named after British or Commonwealth cities, but in October 1952 the Air Ministry decided to adopt alliterate names, with the other designs becoming the Avro Vulcan and the Handley-Page Victor. Henceforth, the three would be known as the V bombers. While more expensive than the approach of building one bomber design per category, the RAF insisted on having choice. Air Chief Marshal Sir John Slessor believed that had the air force been forced to choose among the three British bombers under development in the late 1930s—the Avro Manchester, Short Stirling, and Handley Page Halifax—it would have chosen the wrong one.

As a stop gap, the British announced on 27 January 1950 that it had agreed to acquire Boeing B-29 Superfortress bombers from the United States free under the recently passed American Mutual Defense Assistance Act. This allowed the Air Ministry to drop the development of the Sperrin. The B-29 served in the RAF under the name of the Washington B1. The RAF received its first Washington on 22 March 1950, and the eighty-seventh was delivered in June 1952. Like the Lincoln, it was a piston-engine aircraft, and while it did have the range to reach the Soviet Union from British bases, it was not nuclear-capable. The RAF planned to use them against Soviet bomber bases. The Washingtons suffered from maintenance problems due to a lack of spare parts, and most were returned to the US between July 1953 and July 1954; four remained in service until 1958. Their role was assumed by the new jet-propelled English Electric Canberra bomber.

== In service ==
=== First generation ===
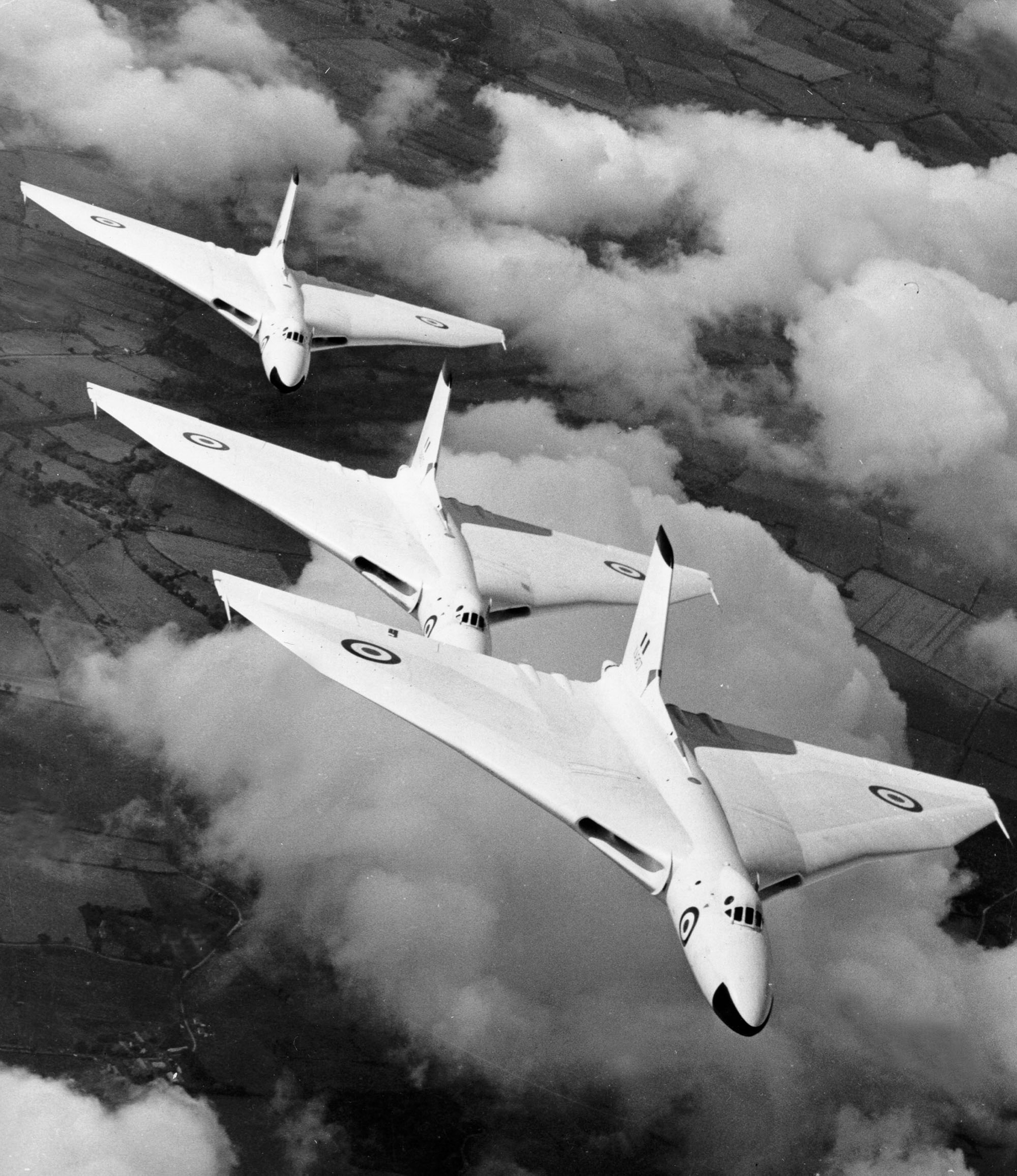
Three Vulcans in flight during 1957, wearing anti-flash white paint and darkened roundels

When the first Blue Danube atomic bombs were delivered to the Bomber Command Armaments School at RAF Wittering on 7 and 11 November 1953, the RAF had no bombers capable of carrying them. Sir William Penney noted that "the RAF has handled aircraft for a long time and can fly Valiants as soon as they come off the production line. But the Royal Air Force has not yet handled atomic weapons, therefore, we must get some bombs to the RAF at the earliest possible moment, so that the handling and servicing can be practised and fully worked out." The Canberra and Valiant were accorded "super priority" status on 13 March 1952, and in December the Vulcan and Victor also received it.

The Valiant went into production as the first V bomber in 1955. The Valiant entered service in February 1955, the Vulcan in May 1956 and the Victor in November 1957. No. 232 Operational Conversion Unit was formed at RAF Gaydon in June 1955 and aircrew training commenced. The first Valiant squadron, No. 138 Squadron, formed at RAF Gaydon in January 1955, followed by No. 543 Squadron, which was formed at RAF Gaydon on 1 June 1955 before moving to RAF Wyton. Two more Valiant bases were established at RAF Marham and RAF Honington in 1956, and six more squadrons were formed in quick succession: No. 214 Squadron at RAF Marham in March, No. 207 Squadron at RAF Marham and No. 49 Squadron at RAF Wittering in May, No. 148 Squadron at RAF Marham in July, No. 7 Squadron at RAF Honington in November and finally No. 90 Squadron at RAF Honington in January 1957.

Vulcan XA895 was allocated to No. 230 Operational Conversion Unit at RAF Waddington in January 1957, and Vulcan aircrew training commenced. The first Vulcan squadron, No. 83 Squadron, was formed at RAF Waddington in May 1957. It initially used aircraft borrowed from No. 230 Operational Conversion Unit until it received its first Vulcan, XA905, on 11 July 1957. It was followed by No. 101 Squadron, which was formed at RAF Finningley on 15 October 1957. A third Vulcan squadron, No. 617 Squadron, was formed on 1 May 1958 at RAF Scampton, the same base from which it carried out the Dambuster Raids in May 1943. No. 232 Operational Conversion Unit took delivery of its first Victor on 29 November 1957. The first operational Victor squadron was No. 10 Squadron RAF, which received its first Victor on 9 April 1958 and was formed on 15 April. This was followed by No. 15 Squadron, which was formed on 1 September 1958, and No. 57 Squadron, which was formed on 1 January 1959.

The UK nuclear strike force became known officially as the V force or Main Force. V force assets at the end of 1958 were:

- Valiant squadrons
  - No. 7 Squadron, RAF Honington, Valiant B.1
  - No. 18 Squadron, RAF Finningley, Valiant B.1
  - No. 49 Squadron, RAF Wittering, Valiant B.1
  - No. 90 Squadron, RAF Honington, Valiant B.1
  - No. 138 Squadron, RAF Wittering, Valiant B.1
  - No. 148 Squadron, RAF Marham, Valiant B.1
  - No. 207 Squadron, RAF Marham, Valiant B.1
  - No. 214 Squadron, RAF Marham, Valiant B.1
  - No. 543 Squadron, RAF Wyton, Valiant B.1
- Vulcan squadrons
  - No. 83 Squadron, RAF Waddington, Vulcan B.1
  - No. 101 Squadron, RAF Finningley, Vulcan B.1
  - No. 617 Squadron, RAF Scampton, Vulcan B.1
- Victor squadrons
  - No. 10 Squadron, RAF Cottesmore, Victor B.1
  - No. 15 Squadron, RAF Cottesmore, Victor B.1

=== Second generation ===
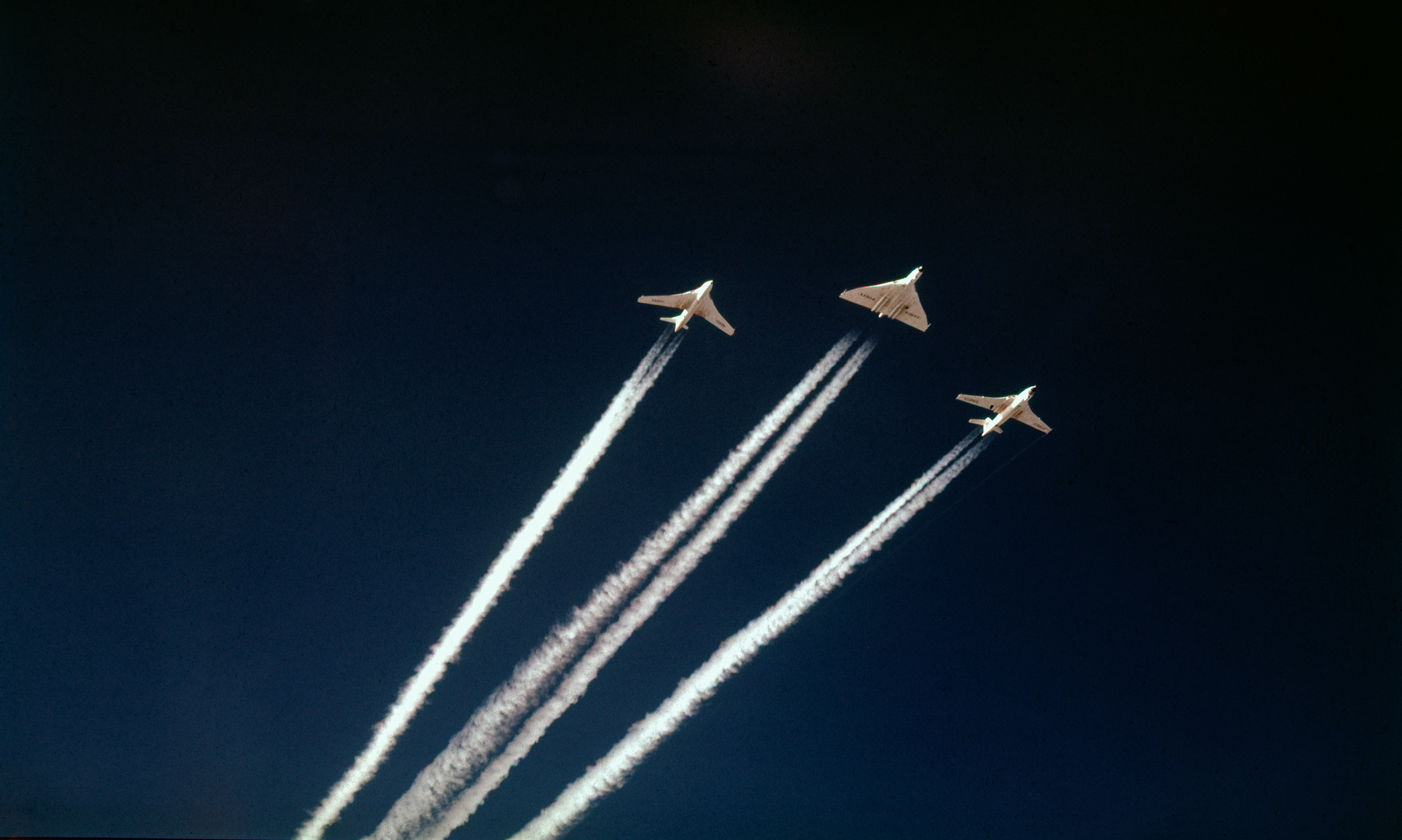
Victor (left), Vulcan (middle), Valiant (right)

The development of effective jet fighters and anti-aircraft missile defences promised to make the nuclear deterrent delivered from bombers flying at high altitudes increasingly ineffective. While making the V bombers fast enough to avoid them was problematic, improved engines offered the possibility of allowing them to fly higher. Since the Mikoyan-Gurevich MiG-19 fighters coming into service in the Soviet Union had a ceiling of 58,725 feet (17,899 m), a V bomber could avoid them by flying at over 60,000 feet (18,000 m). Two dozen of a new model of the Vulcan, the B.2, with 17,000 lbf (76 kN) Bristol Olympus 201 engines, a slightly larger wingspan and new electrical and electronic systems were ordered on 25 February 1956. The last 17 aircraft outstanding from the September 1954 order and 8 from the March 1955 order were switched to the B.2, making a total of 49 on order. Another 40 were ordered on 22 January 1958. A pre-production model, XH533, first flew on 19 August 1958, and in a trial on 4 March 1959 it reached 61,500 feet (18,700 m). The wings and new engines also increased the range by 250 to 300 miles (400 to 480 km). The second production B.2, XH558, was delivered to No. 230 Operational Conversion Unit on 1 July 1960. As Vulcan B.2s were received, the B.1s were withdrawn from service and upgraded to B.1A standard through the installation of more electronics. Most of this work was carried out by Armstrong Whitworth.

Modifications were made to the Victor B.1 in 1959. These included the addition of an in-flight refuelling probe, new electronic countermeasures (ECM) equipment, tail-warning radar, drooped leading edges and a strengthened pressure cabin. This modified version was known as the Victor B.1A. An improved version of the Victor was also programmed with the Armstrong Siddeley Sapphire 9 engine, an improved version of the Sapphire 7 in the Victor B.1. However, development of the Sapphire 9 was cancelled by the Ministry of Supply in February 1956, and a minor improvement to the Sapphire 7 in March 1956 increased its thrust to 11,000 lbf (49 kN), so it was decided to ship 25 of the next production batch of 33 Victors ordered in May 1955 with the Sapphire 7. The remaining eight, along with 18 more Victors ordered in January 1956, were built as Victor B.2s, with the Rolls-Royce Conway RCo.11 engines providing 17,250 lbf (76.7 kN). The new Conway engines required redesigned enlarged intakes to provide the greater airflow required, and the wingspan was extended from 110 to 120 feet (34 to 37 m). As in the Vulcan, the DC electrical system was replaced with an AC one. The prototype Victor B.2, XH668, first flew on 20 February 1959, but was lost over the Irish Sea on 20 August. The first production B.2, XL188, was delivered on 2 November 1961, and No. 139 Squadron became the first Victor B.2 squadron on 1 February 1962.

V force assets at the end of 1962 were:

- Vulcan squadrons
  - No. 9 Squadron, RAF Coningsby, Vulcan B.2
  - No. 12 Squadron, RAF Coningsby, Vulcan B.2
  - No. 27 Squadron, RAF Scampton, Vulcan B.1
  - No. 35 Squadron, RAF Coningsby, Vulcan B.2
  - No. 44 Squadron, RAF Waddington, Vulcan B.1A
  - No. 50 Squadron, RAF Waddington, Vulcan B.1A
  - No. 83 Squadron, RAF Scampton, Vulcan B.1
  - No. 101 Squadron, RAF Waddington, Vulcan B.1A
  - No. 617 Squadron, RAF Scampton, Vulcan B.1
- Victor squadrons
  - No. 10 Squadron, RAF Cottesmore, Victor B.1
  - No. 15 Squadron, RAF Cottesmore, Victor B.1
  - No. 55 Squadron, RAF Honington, Victor B.1A
  - No. 57 Squadron, RAF Honington, Victor B.1A
  - No. 100 Squadron, RAF Wittering, Victor B.2
  - No. 139 Squadron, RAF Wittering, Victor B.2

The V Bomber force reached its peak in June 1964, when 50 Valiants, 70 Vulcans and 39 Victors were in service. In retrospect, the decision to proceed with three V bombers was questionable. As it turned out, all the roles could have been performed by the Valiant, and its B.2 model was specifically designed for the low-level operations that the V bombers would employ in their later years. Moreover, the rationale for producing both the Vulcan and the Victor disappeared early on. That for producing the Victor B.2 instead of concentrating on the Vulcan B.2 was especially dubious, and Air Chief Marshal Sir Harry Broadhurst attributed it to lobbying by Sir Frederick Handley Page, a desire to retain jobs in the aviation industry, and because the government wanted the Rolls-Royce Conway engine produced for the Vickers VC10 airliner.

== Nuclear mission ==
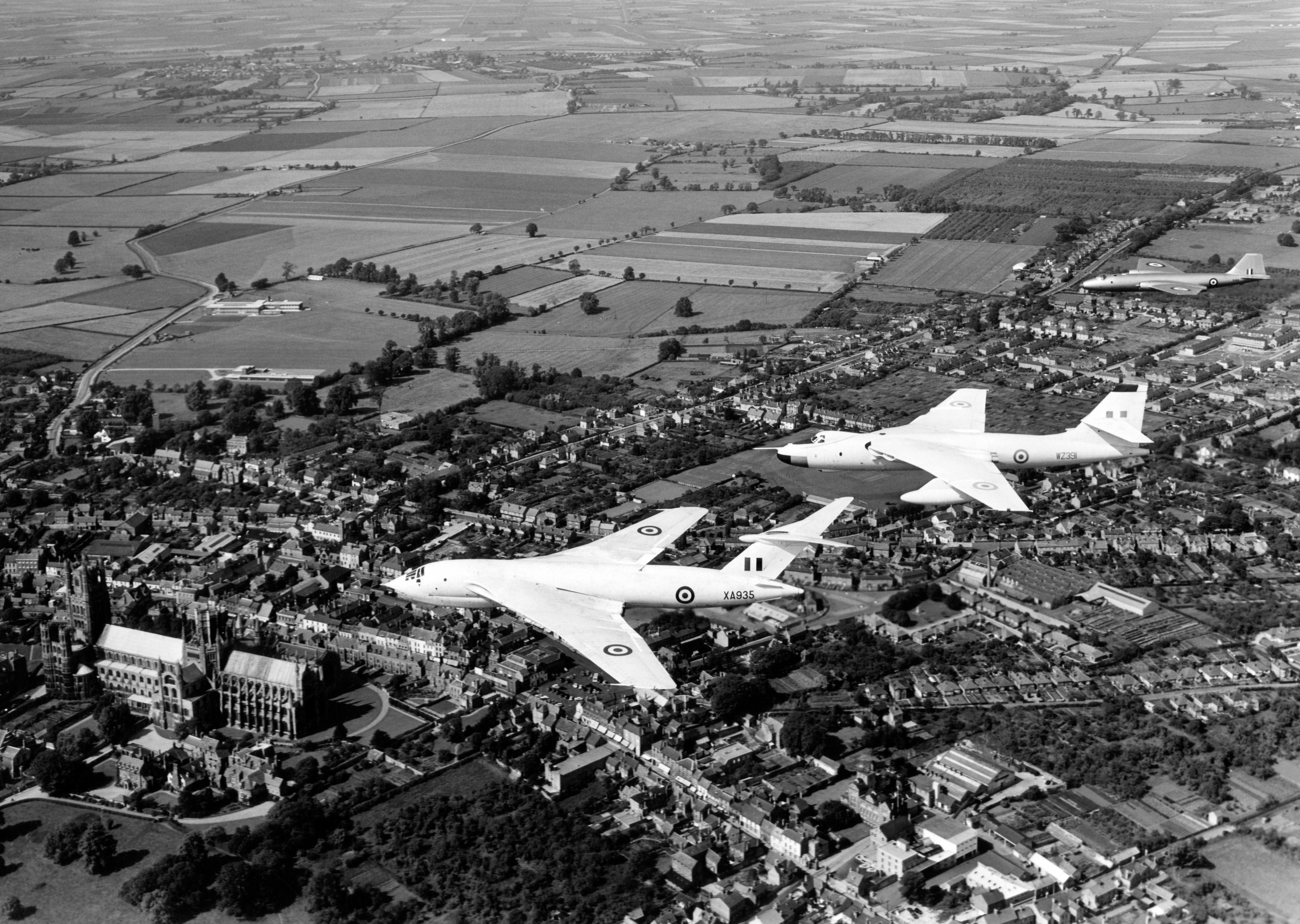
Victor (left) and Valiant (right) in anti-flash white, in 1959

The British government was well aware of the devastation that a nuclear war would bring. A 1953 report estimated that an attack on the UK with 132 fission weapons would generate 2 million casualties. A follow-on study, which considered the possible effect of hydrogen bombs, estimated that as few as ten could reduce the entire UK to a radioactive ruin. Given that defence was impractical, the UK turned to a policy of deterrence, by targeting the population and administrative centres of the Soviet Union. In 1957, the Air Ministry drew up a list of 131 Soviet cities with populations of 100,000 or more. Of these, 98 were within 2,100 nautical miles (3,900 km) of the UK. Of these, 44 were selected. It was estimated that their destruction would kill about thirty per cent of the urban population of the Soviet Union, about 38 million people.

It was almost inconceivable that a war with the Soviet Union would not involve the United States, and as early as 1946, American defence planning envisaged using the UK as a base for nuclear strikes on the Soviet Union, as the United States Air Force (USAF) had not yet developed long-range bombers that could attack key targets in the Soviet Union from bases in the United States. But the United States strategy was that attacks on population centres would have little value once a war had actually begun, and prioritised military targets, particularly those from which nuclear weapons could be launched or deployed.

Coordination of war plans between RAF Bomber Command and the USAF Strategic Air Command (SAC) was clearly desirable, and a joint war plan was negotiated between 1954 and 1958. The RAF's nuclear force was capable of destroying key targets before bomber aircraft from the United States had entered Soviet airspace, "taking into account Bomber Command’s ability to be on target in the first wave several hours in advance of the main SAC force operating from bases in the United States." Based on the assumption that RAF Bomber Command would have about 100 V bombers in operations by 1959, the SAC/RAF agreement assigned 106 targets to the UK: 69 cities, 17 long-range aviation bases, and 20 air-defence sites. Attacks on the air-defence installations would clear the way for waves of SAC bombers to follow. The plan was updated annually; as Soviet capabilities improved, more emphasis was placed on attacking airfields and missile bases.

=== Nuclear testing ===
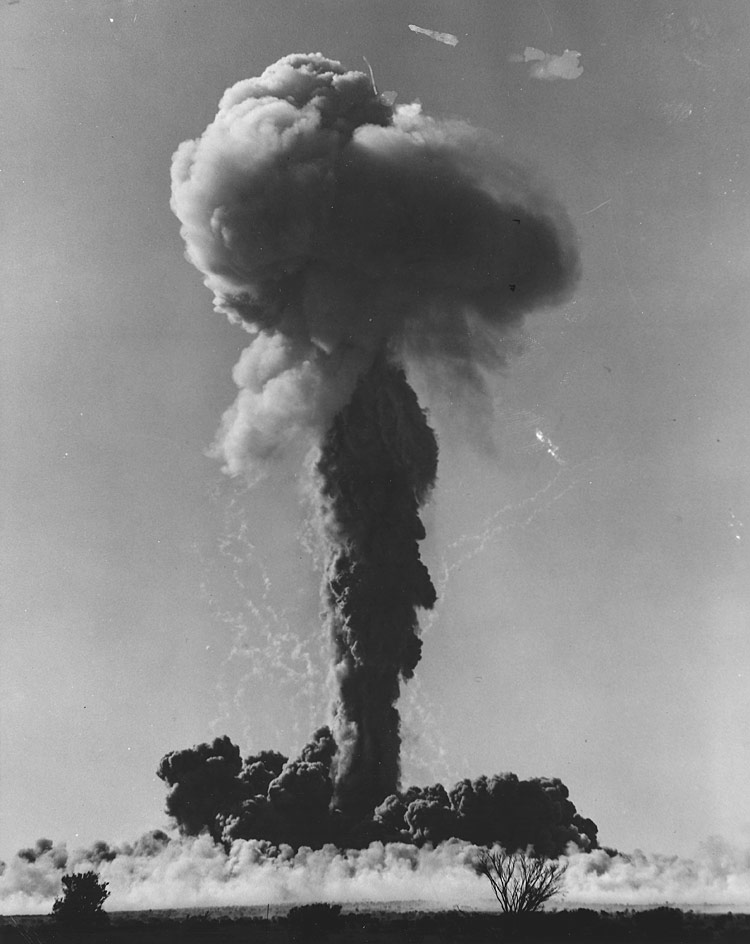
The Buffalo R3/Kite test on 11 October 1956, during which Valiant B.1 WZ366 of No. 49 Squadron became the first British aircraft to drop a live atomic bomb

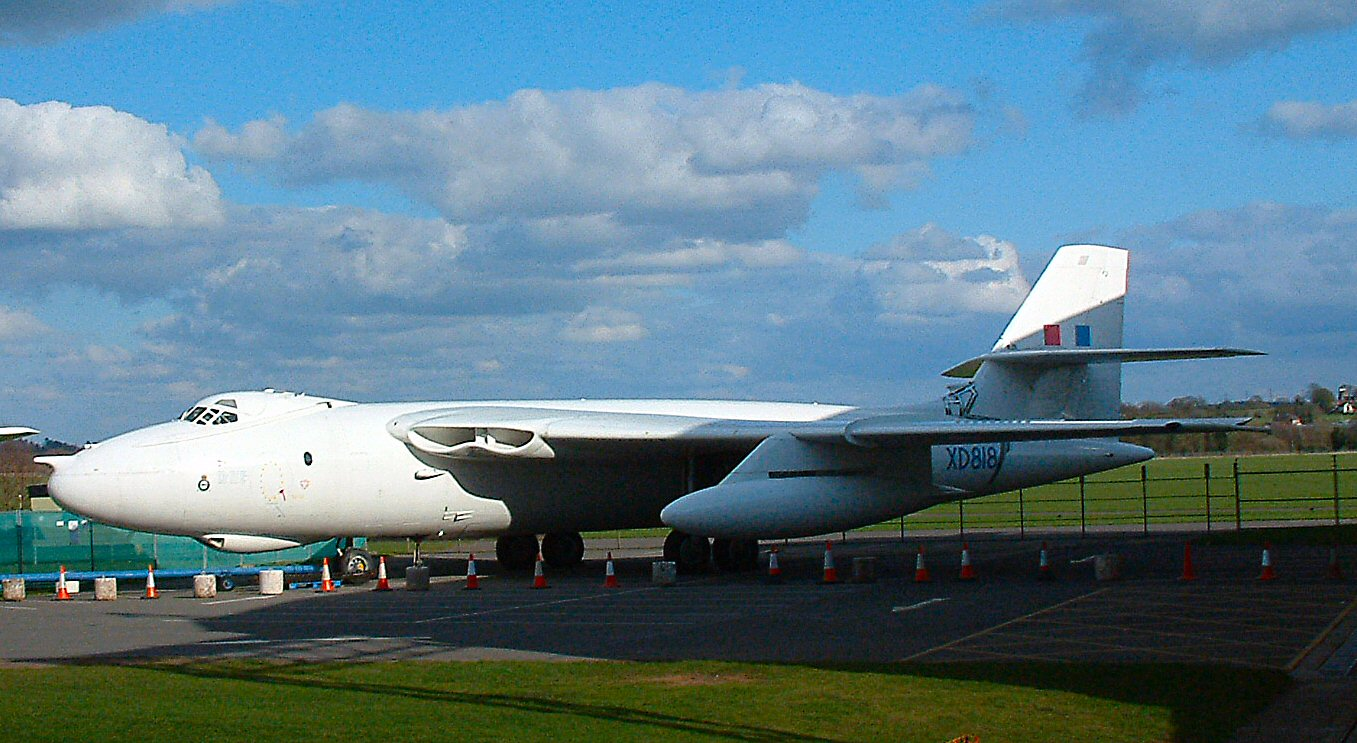
Vickers Valiant B1 XD818, which dropped the first British hydrogen bomb, pictured at Royal Air Force Museum Midlands in 2006

Special Valiant unit No. 1321 Flight was formed at RAF Wittering on 3 August 1954 and conducted ballistic test trials with Blue Danube practice bombs. It became C Flight of No. 138 Squadron in March 1956, and No. 49 Squadron on 1 May 1956.

Tasked with supporting Operation Buffalo and Operation Grapple, No. 49 Squadron was selected to perform live atomic weapon drops and was equipped with specially modified Valiants to conform with the scientific requirements of the tests and other precautionary measures to protect against heat and radiation. In the end, all eight British nuclear weapons that were ever detonated after being dropped from an aircraft were dropped by Valiants of No. 49 Squadron.

Valiants WZ366 and WZ367 were flown to Maralinga, South Australia for Operation Buffalo. Valiant B.1 WZ366 became the first RAF aircraft to drop an operational atomic bomb when it performed a test drop of a down-rated 3-kt Blue Danube at Maralinga on 11 October 1956. The bomb landed about 100 yards (91 m) left and 60 yards (55 m) short of the target. The pilot was Squadron Leader Edwin Flavell, and the bomb aimer was Flight Lieutenant Eric Stacey, and both were awarded the Air Force Cross in the 1957 New Year Honours.

On 15 May 1957, Valiant B.1 XD818 flown by Wing Commander Kenneth Hubbard dropped "Short Granite", the first British hydrogen bomb, over the Pacific the as part of Operation Grapple. The test was largely a failure, as the measured yield was less than a third of the maximum expected and the device failed to achieve a thermonuclear explosion as intended. The first British hydrogen bomb that detonated as planned was Grapple X Round A, dropped on 8 November 1957. The Grapple series of tests continued into 1958, and the Grapple Y bomb exploded in April 1958 with ten times the yield of the original "Short Granite". Testing was finally terminated in November 1958 when the British government decided to cease atmospheric testing.

=== Project E ===
As V bomber production picked up, the number of bombers exceeded the number of available British nuclear weapons. Britain had only ten nuclear bombs in 1955, and just 14 in 1956. To make up the difference, American nuclear weapons were obtained through Project E. Since they were in American custody, they were not available for the RAF to use as part of the UK's independent national nuclear deterrent; only British-owned weapons could be used for that purpose. The Vulcan and Victor were armed with British-built bombs Blue Danube, Red Beard, Violet Club, and Yellow Sun of both the Mk 1 and Mk 2 versions. Project E modifications to Valiants commenced at RAE Farnborough in February 1956. Crew training was carried out with American instructors at RAF Boscombe Down.

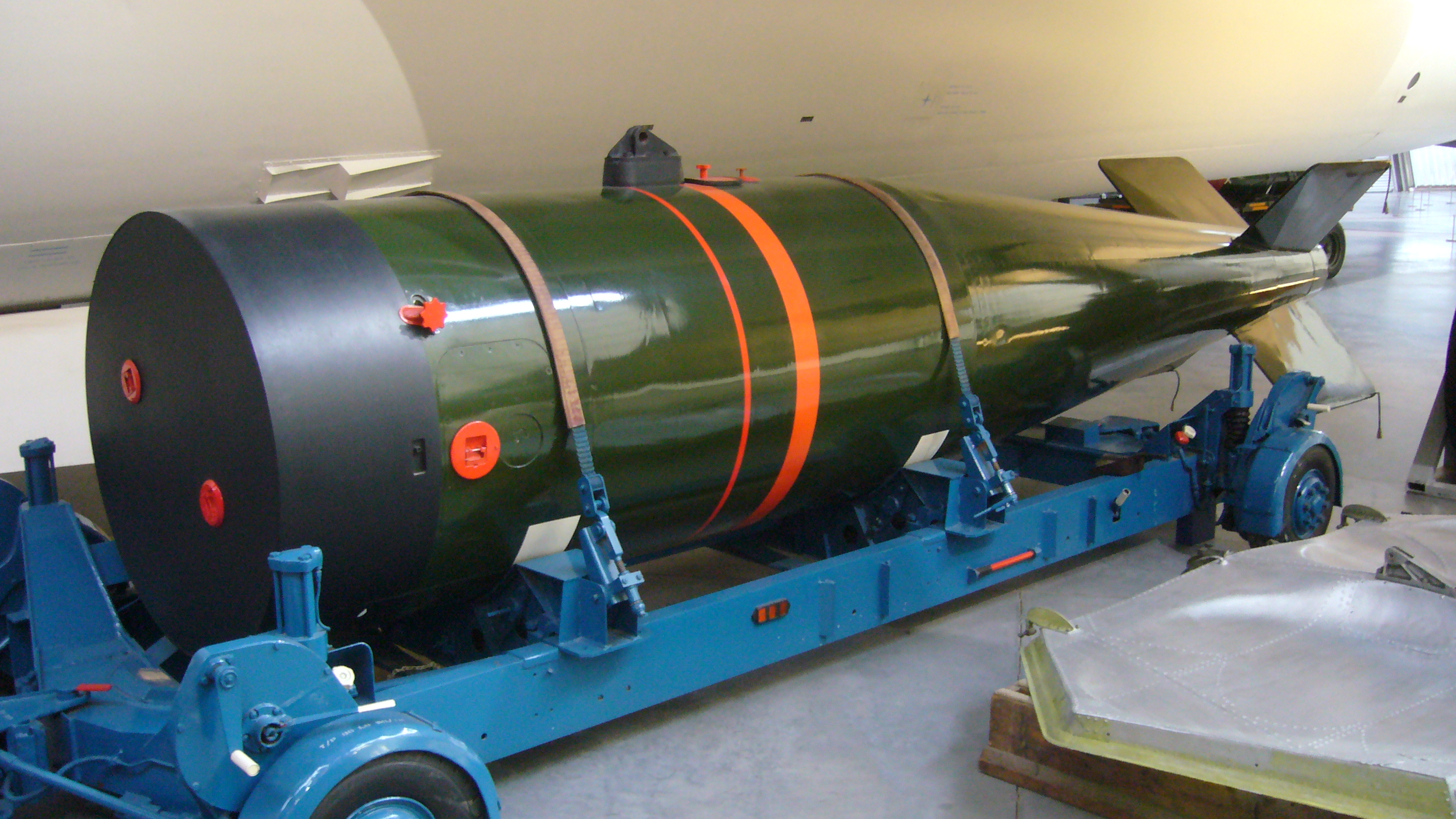
A British Yellow Sun nuclear bomb, photographed under the wing of Valiant XD818 at the Royal Air Force Museum Midlands

The planned V bomber force was reduced to 144 aircraft, and it was planned to equip half of them with Project E weapons. The first 28 Valiants were modified by October 1957; the remaining 20 Valiants, along with 24 Vulcans, were ready by January 1959. Under the Project E Memorandum of Understanding, US personnel had custody of the weapons. That meant they performed all the tasks related to their storage, maintenance and readiness. While the bombs were at the same bases as the bombers, they were stored in Secure Storage Areas (SSAs) that British staff were not permitted to enter. It was therefore impossible to store British and American bombs together in the same SSA. Bomber Command designated RAF Marham, RAF Waddington and RAF Honington as bases with US SSAs. Another three sites had British SSAs. US custody created operational problems. The procedure for handing over the bombs added an extra ten minutes to the bombers' reaction time, and the requirement that US personnel had guardianship of the weapons at all times meant that neither they nor the bombers could be relocated to dispersal airfields as the RAF desired.

Initially, 72 Mark 5 nuclear bombs were supplied for the V bombers. They had a yield of up to 100 kilotonnes of TNT (420 TJ). The successful British development of the hydrogen bomb, and a favourable international relations climate caused by the Sputnik crisis, led to the United States Atomic Energy Act being amended again in 1958, resulting in the long-sought resumption of the nuclear Special Relationship between Britain and the United States in the form of the 1958 US–UK Mutual Defence Agreement. The United States now agreed to supply the V bombers with megaton weapons in place of the Mark 5, in the form of Mark 15 and Mark 39 nuclear bombs. The Treasury immediately inquired as to whether this meant that the British megaton bomb programme could be terminated. The answer was no; the operational restrictions imposed by Project E "effectively handed the US government a veto over the use of half of Britain's nuclear deterrent". With sufficient British bombs on hand, operational issues, and the concept of an independent nuclear deterrent came to the fore.

The Air Council decided on 7 July 1960 that Project E weapons would be phased out by December 1962, by which time it was anticipated that there would be sufficient British megaton weapons to equip the entire strategic bomber force. Project E weapons were replaced by British Yellow Sun bombs at RAF Honington on 1 July 1961 and Waddington on 30 March 1962. Problems encountered in the development of the Red Beard bomb meant that the replacement of kiloton weapons took longer. The UK-based Valiants at Honington and Wittering were withdrawn in April and October 1962, and the last Valiants were retired from the V bomber force in July 1965. The final practice loading at RAF Marham—with the Mark 43s—was in January 1965, and the last US personnel left the base in July.

=== Low level strike ===
The prospect of bombers being able to avoid the Soviet air defences dimmed with the appearance of the Mikoyan-Gurevich MiG-21, which Nigel Birch, the Secretary of State for Air and senior RAF officers saw at Tushino Airfield on 24 June 1956. There was no immediate concern as Soviet designs often took several years to deploy; but its ceiling of 65,610 feet (20,000 m) posed a clear threat to the V bombers. So too did the new SA-2 surface-to-air missiles, which appeared in 1957. One of them shot down an American Lockheed U-2 piloted by Francis Gary Powers over the Soviet Union on 1 May 1960. In 1957, the supersonic Avro 730 bomber was cancelled. This freed up funds for the Blue Streak missile programme, but it too was cancelled, on 24 February 1960. To extend the effectiveness and operational life of the V bombers, an Operational Requirement (OR1132), was issued on 3 September 1954 for an air-launched, rocket-propelled standoff missile with a range of 100 nautical miles (190 km) that could be launched from a V bomber. This became Blue Steel. The Ministry of Supply placed a development contract with Avro in March 1956, and it entered service in December 1962.

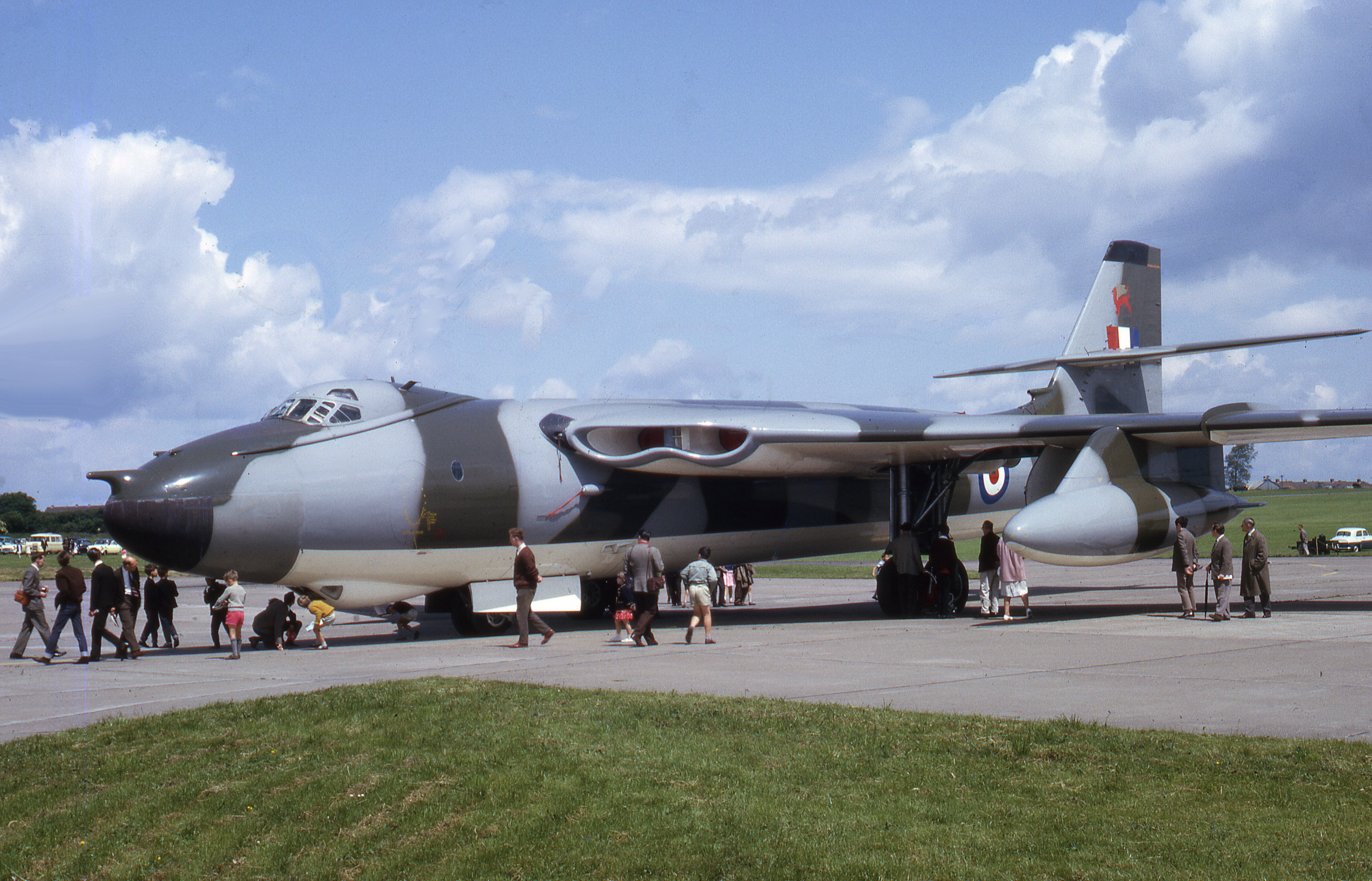
A camouflaged Valiant during the 1960s

By this time, it was anticipated that even with Blue Steel, the air defences of the Soviet Union would soon improve to the extent that V bombers might find it difficult to attack their targets, and there were calls for the development of the Blue Steel Mark II with a range of at least 600 nautical miles (1,100 km). Despite the name, this was a whole new missile, and not a development of the Mark I. The Minister of Aviation, Duncan Sandys, insisted that priority be accorded to getting the Mark I into service, and the Mark II was cancelled at the end of 1959. Considerable modification was required to enable the Victors to carry Blue Steel. These included structural changes to the bomb bay. New 20,600 lbf (92 kN) Conway RCo.17 engines were installed, along with a combustor ignition system to allow all four engines to be started simultaneously and reduce scramble time to 1 1/2 minutes per aircraft. A total of 23 Victor B.2 aircraft were upgraded to the new standard, known as B.2R (for retrofit), and two more were built as such.

The British government then turned to Skybolt, an American missile that combined the range of Blue Streak with the mobile basing of the Blue Steel, and was small enough that two could be carried on the Vulcan bomber. Armed with a British Red Snow warhead, this would improve the capability of the UK's V bomber force, and extend its useful life into the late 1960s and early 1970s. Cabinet Defence Committee approved the acquisition of Skybolt in February 1960. The Vulcan B.2s were modified to carry a pair of Skybolt missiles. They were fitted with 20,000 lbf (89 kN) Bristol Olympus 301 engines, strengthened wings and two special attachment points. A British warhead was designed to fit in Skybolt's nose cone, and dummy test firings were carried out at RAF West Freugh commencing on 9 December 1961. It did not prove possible to modify the Victors. The project came to an abrupt halt when the US government cancelled Skybolt on 31 December 1962, but the vestigial attachment points were used for AN/ALQ-101 electronic countermeasure pods during the Falklands War. To replace Skybolt, the Prime Minister, Harold Macmillan, negotiated the Nassau Agreement with the President of the United States John F. Kennedy on 3 January 1963, under which the US agreed to supply the UK with Polaris submarine-launched ballistic missiles instead. This spelt the beginning of the end of the V bombers' nuclear deterrent, but six more years passed before the submarines were built and the Royal Navy was able to take over responsibility.

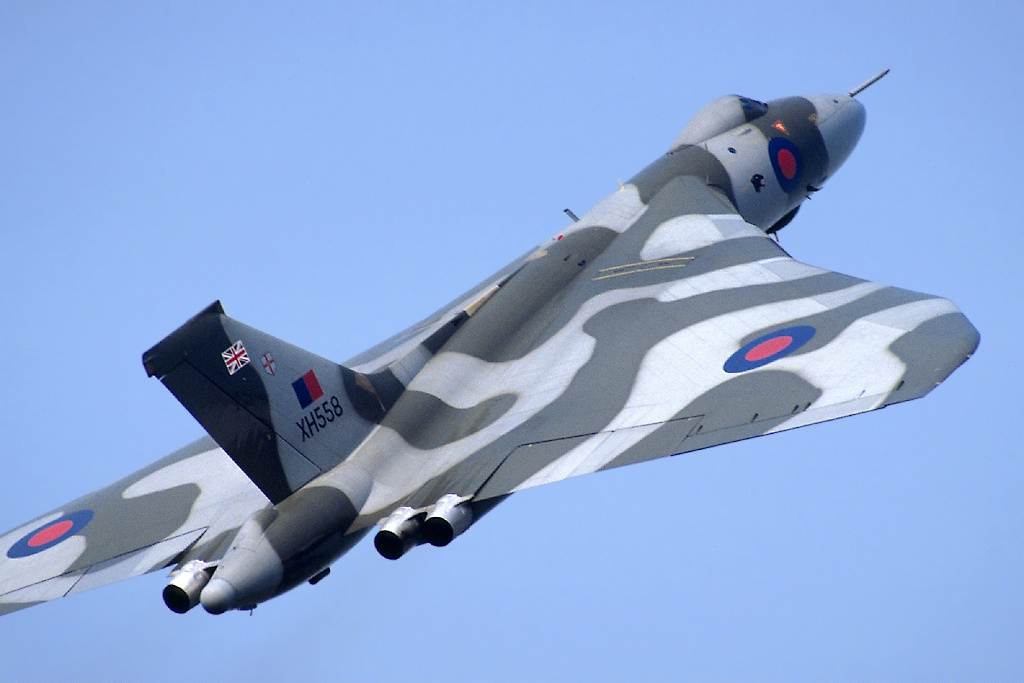
Avro Vulcan XH558

Although originally part of the V force, three squadrons of Valiants were assigned to SACEUR as part of the TBF (Tactical Bomber Force), while remaining part of Bomber Command for training and administration. As the new Victors and Vulcans became available, Valiants became surplus to the planned V force of 144 aircraft. It was proposed that 24 Valiants could replace 64 Canberra bombers. This represented a numerical reduction in the force available to SACEUR, but an improvement in capability due to the Valiants' all-weather strike capacity. The decision was taken by the Air Council on 15 May 1958. The first squadron to be assigned was No. 207 Squadron, on 1 January 1960. It was followed by No. 49 Squadron on 1 July, and No. 148 on 13 July. No. 49 Squadron moved to RAF Marham so that all three squadrons were concentrated there. They were each equipped with two Mark 28 nuclear bombs provided by Project E. The three TBF squadrons eventually became the only Valiant bomber squadrons as all the others were disbanded or converted to tanker or strategic reconnaissance roles. They adopted SACEUR's Quick Reaction Alert, under which arrangements were made so that three armed aircraft were always ready to scramble within 15 minutes. They were also the first V bombers to adopt a low-level strike role, with their white paintwork replaced by green camouflage. During the Cuban Missile Crisis, each V force squadron kept one fully armed aircraft and crew at 15 minutes' readiness.

By 1963, the RAF was convinced that, to have any chance of survival, the V bombers would have to attack at low level. At altitudes below 3,000 feet (910 m), radar was less effective due to ground-generated clutter. The three Vulcan B.1A squadrons at RAF Waddington and the four Victor B.1A squadrons at RAF Honington and RAF Cottesmore were ordered to switch to low-level operations in March 1963. The Vulcan B.2 and Victor B.2 squadrons followed on 1 May 1964. A sign of the new doctrine was the replacement of their white paintwork with green camouflage on their upper surfaces, starting with Vulcan XH505 on 24 March 1964. They were also outfitted with new ECMs, ground positioning equipment and terrain-following radar. Tests performed in the UK and at Woomera demonstrated that Blue Steel could be launched from low level. The Yellow Sun Mark 2 free-fall bomb was a different story, and V bombers equipped with it would have had to climb to medium altitude to release it. A new bomb, the WE.177 was developed. Deliveries of the 450-kilotonne-of-TNT (1,900 TJ) WE.177B commenced in September 1966. Through Project E and the introduction of the smaller, lighter Red Beard bomb, which entered service in 1960, by the mid-1960s Canberras and the Royal Navy's Fleet Air Arm were able to deliver nuclear weapons, but their power was insignificant compared with that of the 109 Victor and Vulcan bombers.

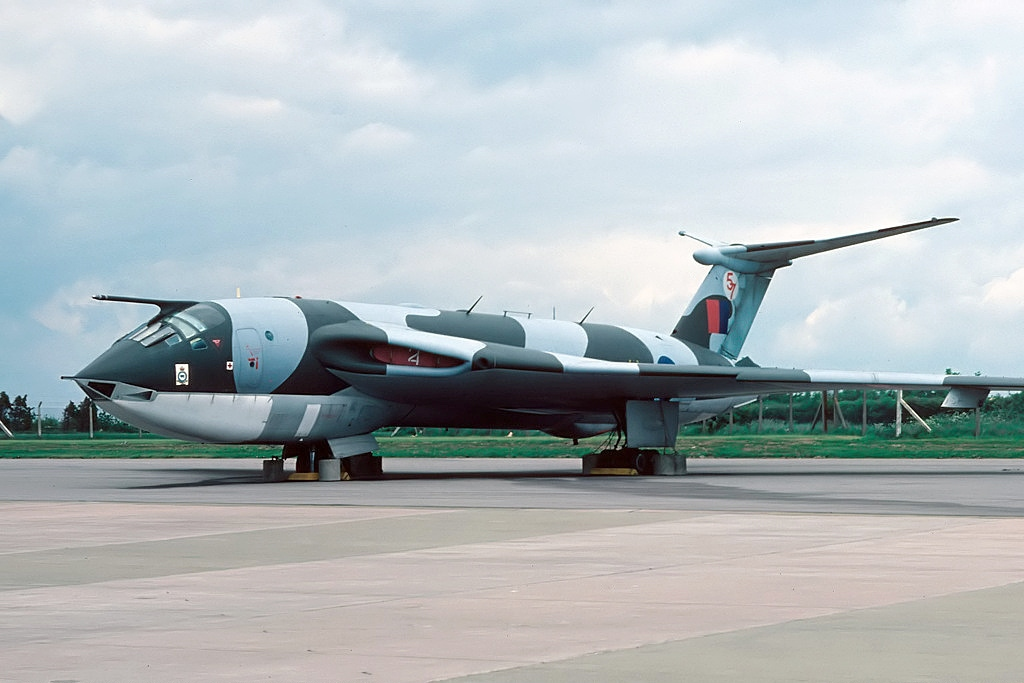
Victor XH649

The V bombers were formally relieved of their role as the deliverer of the UK strategic nuclear deterrent, which officially passed to the Polaris ballistic missile submarines of the Royal Navy on 1 July 1969. The last Blue Steel mission was flown on 21 December 1970. Five Vulcan squadrons continued to serve with the WE.177B weapon in a tactical role in Europe with SACEUR. Nos 9 and 35 Squadrons moved to RAF Akrotiri in Cyprus, where they replaced Canberra bombers in support of CENTO and operations on NATO's southern flank. They were withdrawn in 1975 in the wake of the Turkish invasion of Cyprus. Six squadrons of Vulcans were still assigned this role with the WE.177 weapon in 1981. The last four remaining squadrons were about to disband in 1982 when called upon to assist in the Falklands War.

== Conventional mission ==
=== Suez crisis ===
The first V bomber to see combat use with conventional bombs was the Valiant in Operation Musketeer, the Anglo-French military response in the Suez Crisis in 1956. It was the first and only time the Valiants dropped bombs in combat operations. RAF units began deploying to Malta in September 1956, and when Israel attacked Egypt on 29 October 1956, four Valiant squadrons—Nos 138, 148, 207 and 214 Squadrons—were based at RAF Luqa. No. 138 Squadron was the only one with a full complement of eight Valiants; Nos 148 and 207 each had six, and No. 214 had only four. The initial objective was to neutralise the Egyptian Air Force, which was believed to have about 100 Mikoyan-Gurevich MiG-15 jet fighters and 30 Ilyushin Il-28 twin-engine jet bombers. The Egyptian early-warning radar system was known to be non-operational due to lack of maintenance and spare parts, so the bombers were ordered to operate at night when the visually-controlled defences would be least effective. This meant a reversion to the tactics used by Bomber Command in the Second World War. The Valiants were neither trained nor equipped for such a mission. Not all of the Valiants were equipped with the Navigation and Bombing System (NBS) and it was not serviceable in all of those that were. This forced a reversion to the older, visual bomb sight. The Valiants and Canberras were equipped with the Gee-H radio navigation system, but it could not be used as there were no beacons in the Middle East. However, the Valiants were also equipped with Green Satin radar, which could still be used.

The first mission was flown on 31 October, in co-operation with Canberra bombers from Malta and Cyprus. The target was five Egyptian airbases in the Cairo area, including Cairo West Air Base. At the last minute, it was discovered that fifteen US transport aircraft were at Cairo West evacuating civilians, and the target had to be altered while the bombers were already in the air. The Valiants dropped target markers, and then Canberras dropped flares to illuminate the target area. This allowed other Canberras to drop bombs on the runways. This pattern was repeated in attacks on four airfields in the Nile Delta and eight in the Suez Canal area over the next two nights. The Valiant's final mission was flown on 3 November against El Agami Island, which was believed to be a submarine repair depot. By the time operations ended, 450 long tons (460 t) of bombs had been dropped, half of which had fallen within 650 yards (590 m) of their targets. The results were unimpressive. Three of the seven main Egyptian airbases remained fully operational, one had its runway shortened, and one had three craters that needed filling. The only airbase that was completely out of commission was Cairo West, and then only because of Egyptian demolitions.

=== Far East operations ===
On 29 October 1957, three Valiants from No. 214 Squadron flew to RAF Changi in Singapore for a fortnight to gain experience operating in the Far East. This was known as Exercise Profiteer. Subsequently, small detachments of Valiants and Vulcans deployed to the Far East for a fortnight every three months until June 1960. Although the Malayan Emergency was ongoing at this time, none of the Exercise Profiteer aircraft participated in combat operations. When the Valiants were assigned to SACEUR for operations in Europe, the conventional mission in the Middle East was assigned to the Vulcans at RAF Waddington, while that in the Far East was given to the Victors based at RAF Cottesmore and RAF Honington. When the Indonesian Confrontation heated up in December 1963, eight Victors from Nos 10 and 15 Squadrons were sent to the Far East, where they were based at RAF Tengah and RAAF Butterworth. The crews normally served 3 1/2-month tours. No. 10 Squadron was disbanded in March 1964, and No. 15 Squadron in October. No. 12(B) Squadron replaced them at RAAF Butterworth from October. The Vulcans were recalled to UK in December 1964 whilst the responsibility for the Far East fell on temporary detachments of Vulcans of Nos 9, 12 and 35 Squadrons with up to 16 aircraft for short periods. Tensions decreased after March 1965, and the size of the detachment was cut to four aircraft. As the Waddington Wing converted to the Mk2 Vulcan the responsibility was transferred to Nos 44, 50 and 101 Squadrons. Annual deployments in support of SEATO continued for some years.

=== Falklands War ===
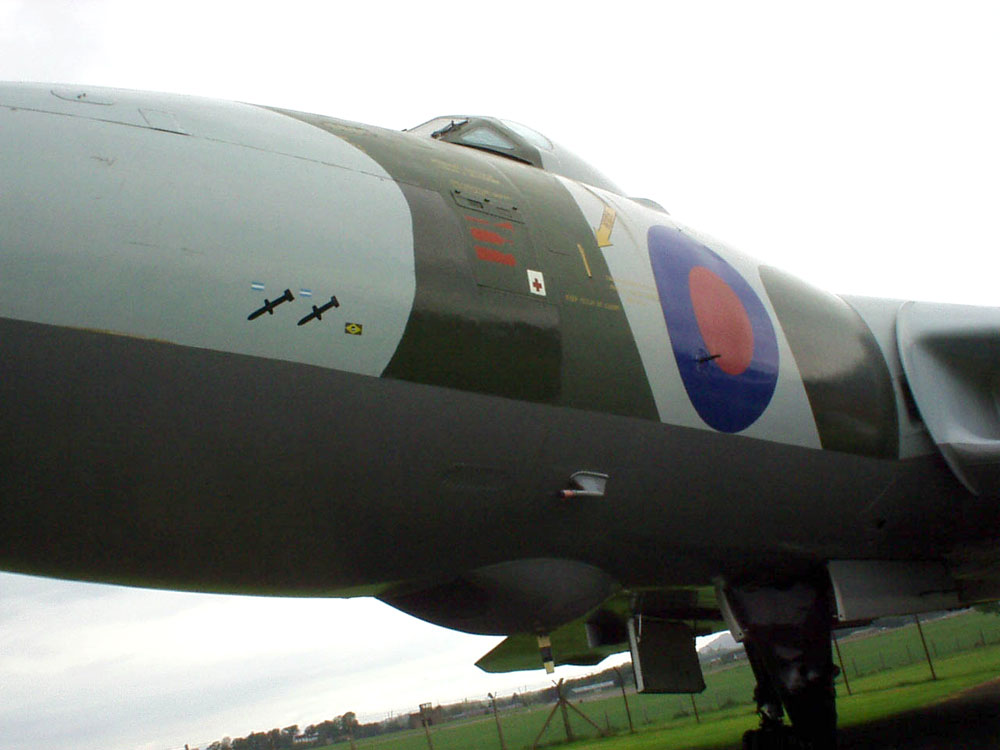
Vulcan XM597, showing mission markings from its two Black Buck missions and Brazilian internment.

During the 1982 Falklands War, Vulcan bombers from Nos 44, 50 and 101 Squadrons, supported by Victor tankers from Nos 55 and 57 Squadrons, carried out a series of seven extremely long-range ground attack missions against Argentine positions in the Falkland Islands. The operation was codenamed Black Buck. The objectives of the missions were to attack Port Stanley Airport and its associated defences. While the Vulcans were capable of carrying conventional munitions, this had not been done for a long time. To carry twenty-one 1,000-pound (450 kg) bombs, the Vulcan required three sets of bomb carriers, each of which held seven bombs. Their release was controlled by a panel at the navigator's station known as a 90-way that monitored the electrical connections to each bomb, and was said to provide 90 different sequences for releasing the bombs. None of the Vulcans at RAF Waddington were fitted with the bomb racks or the 90-way. A search of the supply dumps at Waddington and RAF Scampton located the 90-way panels, which were fitted and tested, but finding enough septuple bomb carriers proved harder, and at least nine were required. Someone remembered that some had been sold to a scrapyard in Newark-on-Trent, and they were retrieved from there. Locating sufficient bombs also proved difficult, and only 167 could be found, and some had cast bomb cases instead of the preferable machined ones. Training of crews in conventional bombing and in-flight refuelling was carried out from 14 to 17 April 1982.

The raids, at almost 6,800 nautical miles (12,600 km) and 15 hours for the return journey, were the longest-ranged bombing raids in history at the time. The Black Buck raids were staged from RAF Ascension Island, close to the equator. The Vulcans lacked the range to fly to the Falklands without refuelling several times, as did the converted Victor tankers, so they too had to be refuelled in flight. Eleven tankers were required for two Vulcans, a huge logistical effort as all aircraft had to use the same runway. The aircraft carried either twenty-one 1,000-pound (450 kg) bombs internally or two or four Shrike anti-radar missiles externally. Of the five Black Buck raids flown to completion, three were against Stanley Airfield's runway and operational facilities, and the other two were anti-radar missions using Shrike missiles against a Westinghouse AN/TPS-43 long-range 3D radar in the Port Stanley area. Shrikes hit two of the less valuable and rapidly replaced secondary fire control radars, causing minor damage.

== Withdrawal of the Valiant ==
In July 1964, a Valiant of No. 543 Squadron (WZ394) on a deployment to Rhodesia was found to have cracks in the rear wing spar and was ferried back to the UK for repairs. The following month, a Valiant from No. 232 Operational Conversion Unit (WP217) suffered a wing spar failure during a training exercise over Wales. The whole Valiant fleet was checked, and many were found to have significant cracks in the wing spars. Those that were considered to have little or no damage were cleared to fly, but with a temporary restriction to a maximum speed of 250 knots (460 km/h), maximum load of 0.5 g_{0} (4.9 m/s^{2}), and a maximum bank angle of 30 degrees. When Vickers commenced repairs, it was found that the damage was more severe than first thought, and the entire fleet was grounded on 9 December 1964, and withdrawn from service. At first it was thought that the switch to low-level flying was the cause, but cracks were also found in Valiants that were in service as tanker and strategic reconnaissance aircraft, and had not been flown at low level. Suspicion then fell on the aluminium alloy that had been used, DTD683. One Valiant (XD816) remained in service as a test aircraft, having been re-sparred.

== Electronic countermeasures and reconnaissance ==
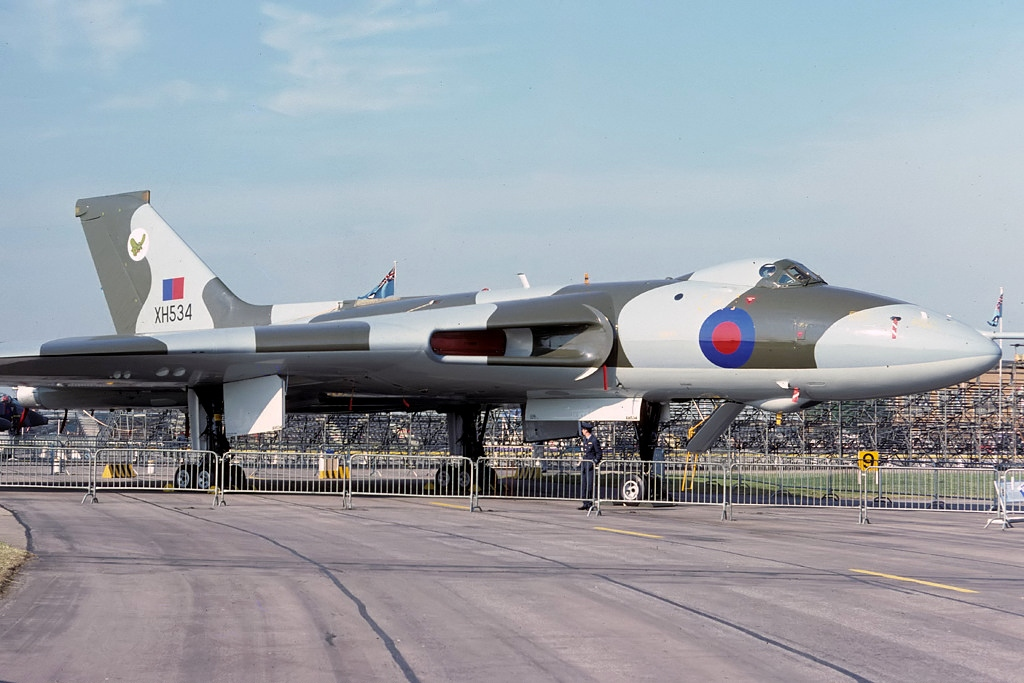
Vulcan XH534 modified for the reconnaissance role in 1977

Valiants served in a photo-reconnaissance role with No. 543 Squadron, commencing in the second half of 1955. At least seven Valiants were configured to the ECM role, serving with No. 199 Squadron from 30 September 1957. These aircraft were ultimately fitted with APT-16A and ALT-7 jamming transmitters, Airborne Cigar and Carpet jammers, APR-4 and APR-9 "sniffing" receivers, and chaff dispensers. After the Valiants were grounded, the timetable for the development of a photo-reconnaissance version of the Victor, known as the SR.2, was accelerated. A prototype (XL165) was flown for the first time on 23 February 1965, and the first aircraft (XL230) was delivered to No. 543 Squadron on 18 May 1965. The Victor SR.2s carried out extensive photographic survey work, which assumed increased importance after the bombers switched to low-level operations. No. 543 Squadron was disbanded on 31 May 1974, but a flight of four remained until 30 March 1975 to participate in French nuclear weapons testing in the Pacific. Responsibility for the reconnaissance role passed to No. 27 Squadron, which had been re-formed in November 1973, and operated the Vulcan SR.2. No. 27 Squadron was disbanded in March 1982.

== Aerial refuelling ==
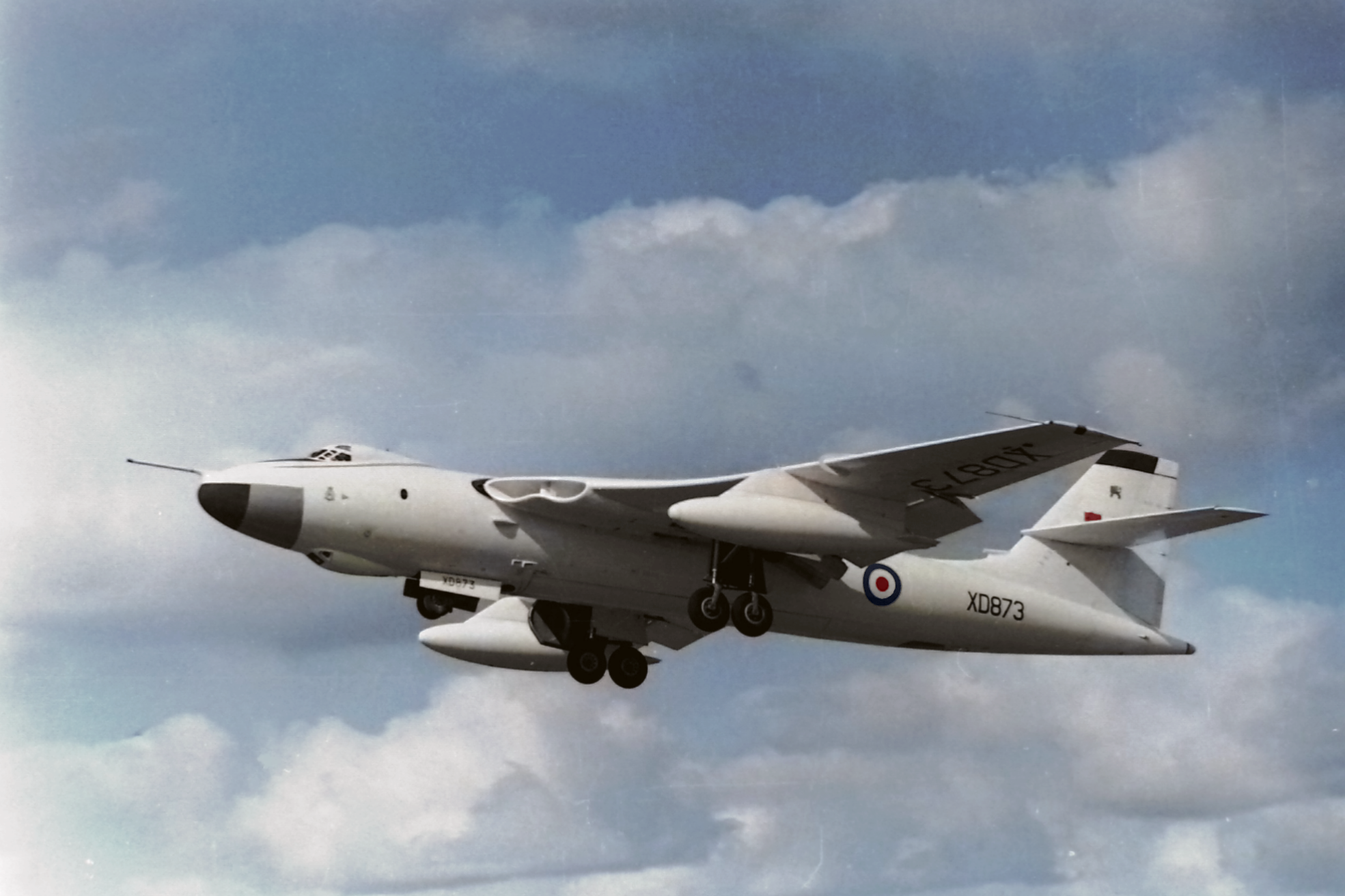
Valiant B(K).1 XD873 in 1962

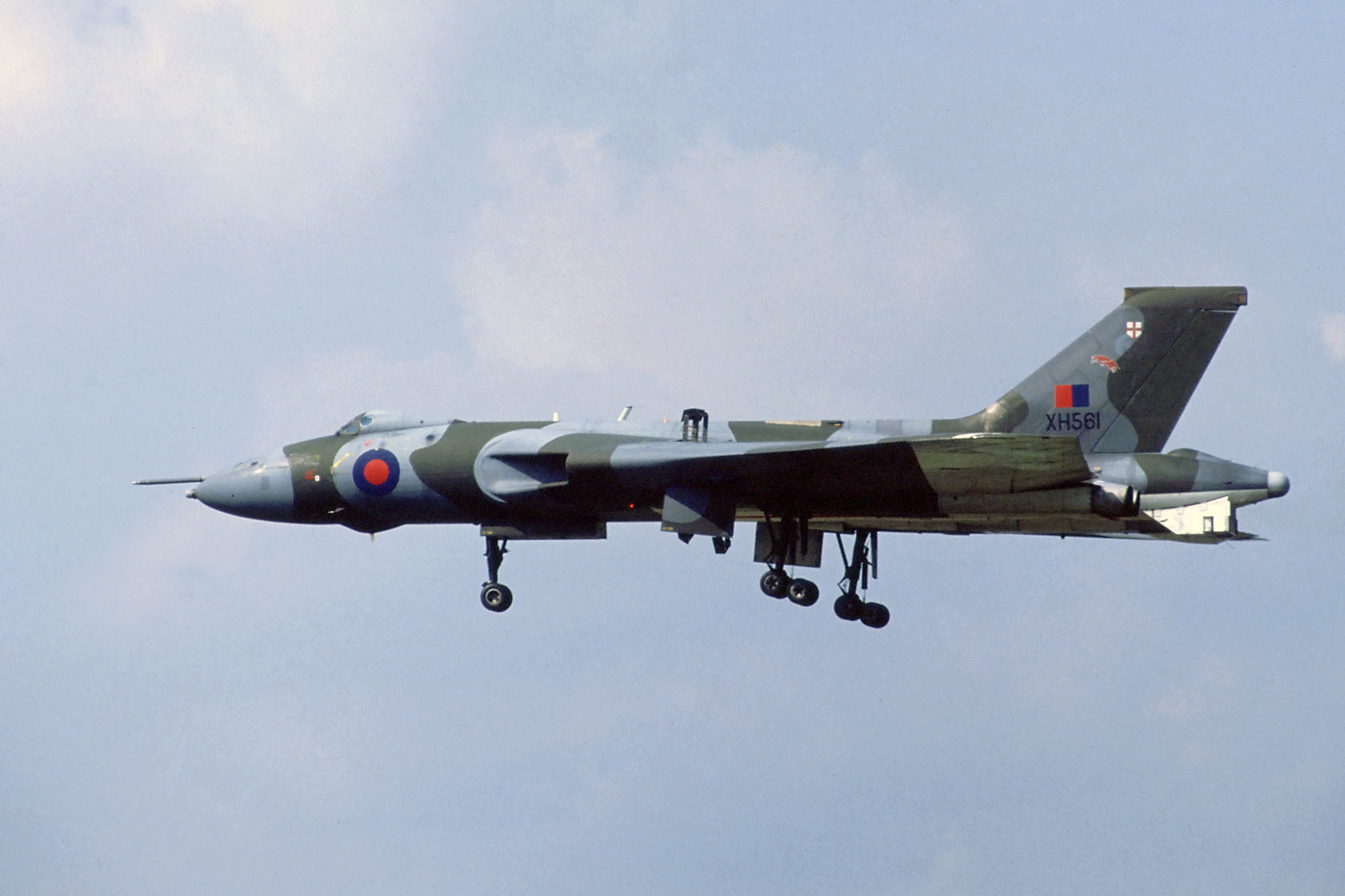
Vulcan K.2 XH561 in 1983

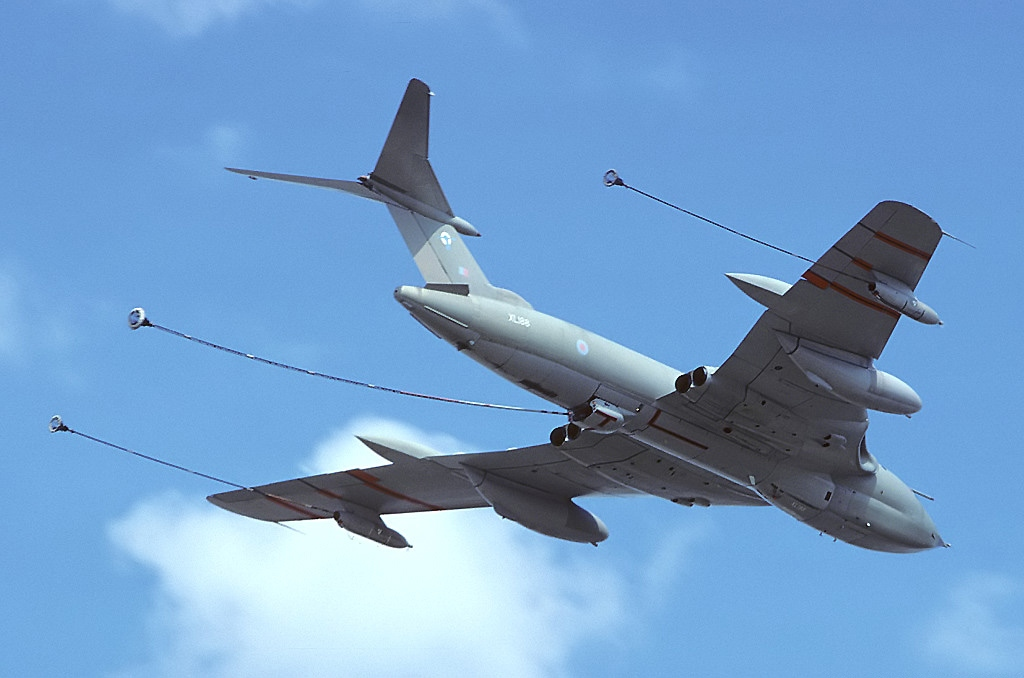
Victor K.2 tanker XL188 in 1990

In addition to the roles for which they were designed, all three V bombers served as aerial refuelling tankers at one time or another. The Valiant was the RAF's first large-scale tanker. The probe and drogue system for aerial refuelling was developed by Sir Alan Cobham, but the Air Ministry doubted its value so long as Britain maintained bases around the world. However, on 8 January 1954, the Air Staff decided that the V bombers should be capable of both aerial refuelling and acting as tankers, and an Operational Requirement (OR3580) was issued in 1956 for an electronic positioning system to facilitate aerial refuelling. Initially, there were no aircraft to perform the role, but two new types of Valiant were ordered. Fourteen B(PR)K.1 versions were produced. These were a tanker variant of the photo-reconnaissance model, with a hose drum unit (HDU) in the bomb bay. The final production model of the Valiant was the BK.1 version, which had a 4,500 pounds (2,000 kg) fuel tank in the front of the bomb bay and an HDU in the rear. Some 44 were built. No. 214 Squadron was selected to carry out tanker trials, while retaining its bombing role, in February 1958. The trials were successful. In August 1961, a second Valiant squadron, No. 90 Squadron, was ordered to begin training in the aerial refuelling role. Nos 90 and 214 Squadrons became full-time tanker squadrons on 1 April 1962. In a demonstration on 20/21 June 1962, a Vulcan B.1A from No. 617 Squadron flew non-stop from RAF Scampton to Sydney in 20 hours and 5 minutes, refuelled four times by tankers from No. 214 Squadron. They served in the role until the Valiants were abruptly withdrawn from service.

Work was already under way to replace the Valiants with Victors. A proposal to convert Victor B.1s and B.1As was first considered by the Air Staff on 25 May 1961 and was endorsed by the Chief Scientific Adviser to the Ministry of Defence, Sir Solly Zuckerman, and the Chiefs of Staff in 1963. The Defence Research Policy Committee (DRPC) estimated that converting 27 aircraft would cost £7 million. This would provide sufficient aircraft for three tanker squadrons. The price tag soon increased to £8 million for 24 aircraft, and the Treasury was reluctant to spend that much money pending a review of Britain's overseas defence commitments, which would establish whether a third squadron was required. There were also doubts about the financial viability of Handley Page. Approval was given for the conversion of twelve aircraft on 12 June, three more on 9 July, and another nine on 15 September. The second production Victor B.1 (XA918) was converted into a prototype tanker. This involved the installation of Flight Refuelling Mark 20B pods on each wing to refuel fighter aircraft, two fuel tanks in the bomb bay, and a Flight Refuelling Mark 17 HDU in the bomb bay for bombers and transport aircraft. The grounding of the Valiant tankers injected some urgency into the situation, as the RAF lost its refuelling capability. Six Victor K.1A tankers were delivered to No. 55 Squadron at RAF Marham in May and June 1965, but these were not full conversions, as they had only the underwing refuelling pods, and retained their bombing capability.

As Victor tankers became available, a second tanker squadron, No. 57 Squadron, was formed at RAF Marham on 14 February 1966, and a third was added on 1 July 1966 when No. 214 Squadron was re-formed. The last Victor bomber squadrons, Nos 100 and 139 Squadrons, were disbanded on 1 October and 31 December 1968 respectively. It was decided to convert their Victor B.2s into tankers. However, while the Vulcans' rigid delta wing coped well with low-altitude flight, it subjected the Victors' slender wings to considerable flexing, and they suffered badly from fatigue cracks. Repairing them became a major cost of the tanker conversion programme, and some Victors were determined to be beyond economical repair. The Victor SR.2s were withdrawn from service to make up the numbers, and were replaced by Vulcans. Due to the increased costs, none of the SR.2s were modified, and only 21 Victor K.2 tankers were converted. Handley Page went into liquidation in August 1969, and the subsequent work was undertaken by Hawker Siddeley. The first Victor K.2 tanker made its maiden flight on 1 March 1972. No. 55 Squadron began re-equipping with the Victor K.2 on 1 July 1975, followed by No. 57 Squadron on 7 June 1976. No. 214 Squadron retained its K.1As until it was disbanded on 28 February 1977, reducing the RAF's tanker fleet to just two squadrons.

During the Falklands War, the commitments of the Victor tanker fleet became overwhelming. All available tankers were deployed to support operations there. Only the Victor tanker fleet made it possible for the transport aircraft to reach Ascension Island with vital supplies, and for the Vulcan bombers to reach the Falkland Islands for Operation Black Buck. In the meantime, the RAF forces in the UK were serviced by USAF Boeing KC-135 Stratotankers. Work was in progress to convert VC-10s into tankers, but as an interim measure it was decided to convert a number of Vulcans for the aerial refuelling role (in addition, a quantity of Hercules transports were also converted for this task). The equipment in the ECM bay was removed and a Mark 17 HDU installed there. The first of six converted Vulcan single-point tankers (XH561 - the others being XH558, XH560, XJ825, XL445 and XM571) flew on 18 June 1982, just seven weeks after the conversion work began, and the first Vulcan K.2 tanker was delivered to the RAF five days later, with No. 50 Squadron the unit selected to operate in the tanker role. The HDUs used were those earmarked for the VC-10 conversion programme, so as these were completed, the HDUs were removed from the Vulcans, starting with Vulcan XJ825 on 4 May 1983.

No. 617 Squadron was disbanded on 31 December 1981, followed by No. 35 Squadron on 1 March 1982, and No. 9 Squadron on 1 May 1982. This left only Nos 44, 50 and 101 Squadrons at RAF Waddington, which were all scheduled to disband by 1 July 1982, with their tactical nuclear mission passing to the Panavia Tornado. The Falklands War intervened, providing a temporary reprieve. No. 101 Squadron was disbanded on 4 August 1982, and No. 44 Squadron on 21 December 1982. The last Vulcan unit, No. 50 Squadron at RAF Waddington, was disbanded on 13 March 1984, leaving behind six K.2s and three B.2s. The Ministry of Defence decided to retain a Vulcan in service for air shows. This role was filled by XL426, and then by XH558.In 1992, XH558 was sold to a private owner, and it made its last RAF flight on 23 March 1993.

The Victor tankers saw active service again in the Gulf War, with eight deploying to Muharraq in Bahrain between December 1990 and March 1991. Victor tankers subsequently deployed to Akrotiri in support of Operation Warden, the operations to protect Kurdish communities in the northern part of Iraq, and to Muharraq in support of Operation Jural in southern Iraq. The tankers returned to RAF Marham in September 1993, where No. 55 Squadron, the last Victor unit, was disbanded on 15 October 1993.

== Preservation ==
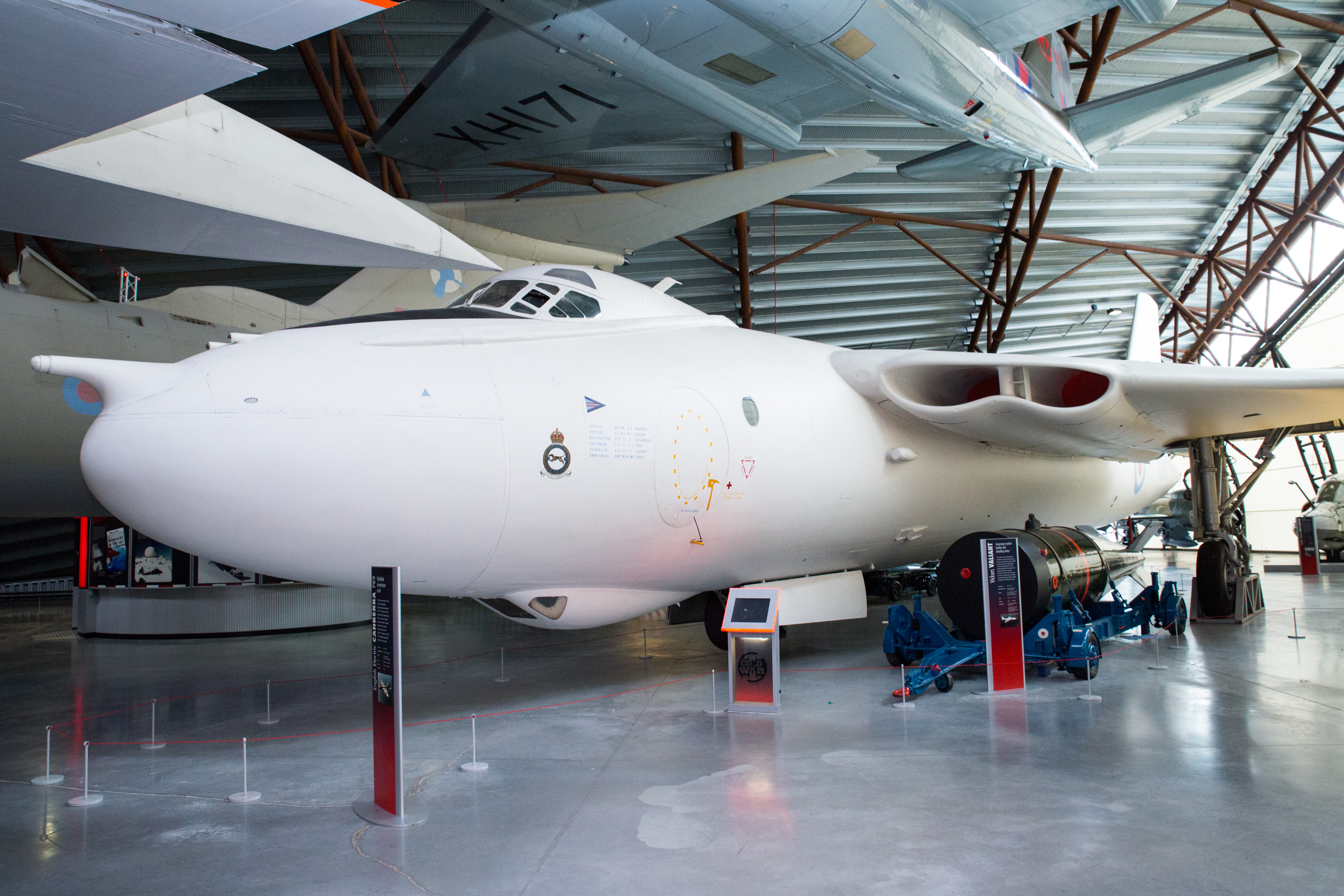
Vickers Valiant B1 XD818, flown by Kenneth Hubbard during Operation Grapple, preserved at Royal Air Force Museum Midlands

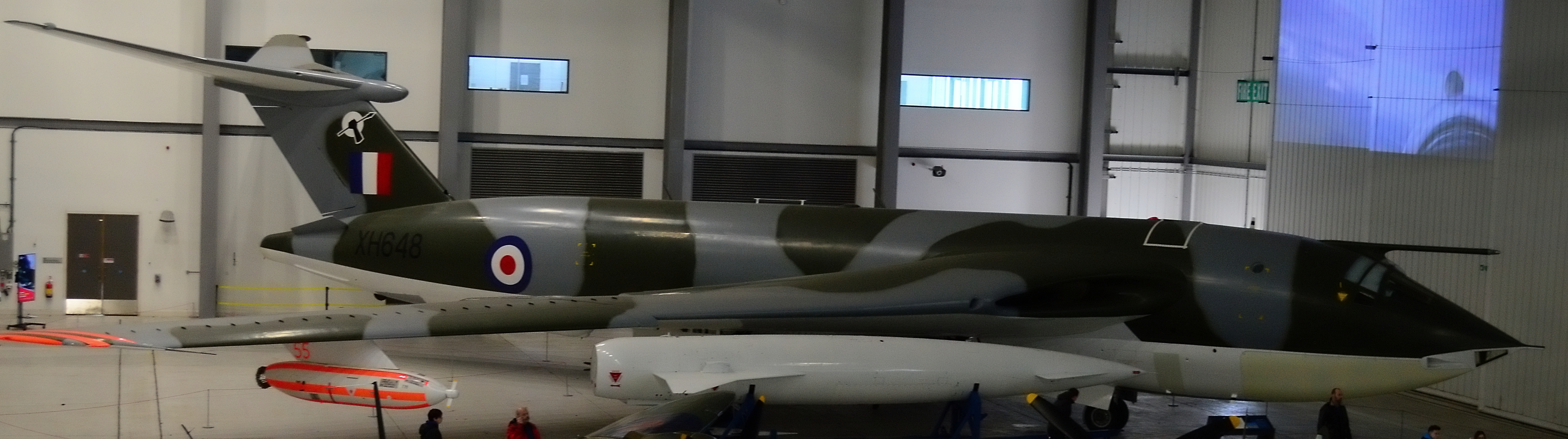
The Handley Page Victor XH648, On display at IWM Duxford. In the AirSpace hangar after preservation by Duxford Conservation Team.

On 8 February 2007, the Royal Air Force Museum Midlands opened the National Cold War Exhibition at RAF Cosford in Shropshire to tell the story of the Cold War. This exhibition brought together static displays of all three types of V bomber in one location for the first time. The museum's director general, Dr Michael A. Fopp, stated the goal was "people will leave feeling better informed about what happened in the second half of the 20th Century."

Vulcan XH558 (Civil Registration G-VLCN), flew until October 2015, funded by public donations. It was displayed at air shows and events. It will be used as a centrepiece for engineering excellence, showing what an advanced design it was for the period.

On 26 September 2022, at Imperial War Museum Duxford, Victor XH648 was put on display after 8 years of restoration at the museum - Funded by donations from the public - costing £450,000. Veterans who flew the aircraft were invited to observe its official unveiling in the museum before it was put on public display. It is currently being displayed in the AirSpace hangar at the museum.

== See also ==
- List of V Bomber dispersal bases
