= British hydrogen bomb programme =

British effort to develop hydrogen bombs between 1952 and 1958

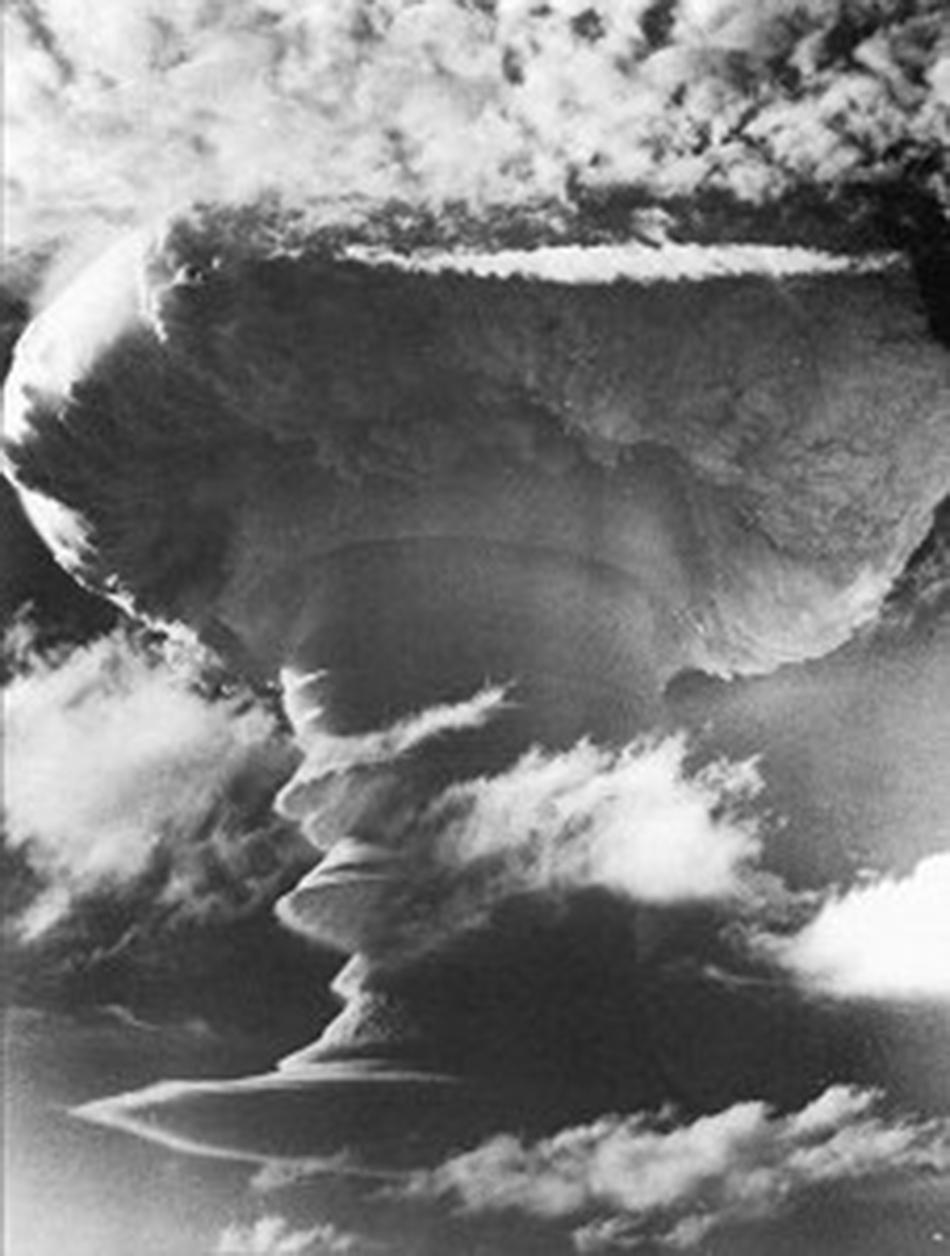
- Grapple X test in November 1957. Britain's first hydrogen bomb test
- Type of project: Thermonuclear weapon deployment
- Country: United Kingdom
- Prime Minister(s): Winston Churchill, Anthony Eden, Harold Macmillan
- Key people: William Penney, William Cook
- Established: 1952
- Disestablished: 1958

The British hydrogen bomb programme was the ultimately successful British effort to develop hydrogen bombs between 1952 and 1958. During the early part of the Second World War, Britain had a nuclear weapons project, codenamed Tube Alloys. At the Quebec Conference in August 1943, British prime minister Winston Churchill and United States president Franklin Roosevelt signed the Quebec Agreement, merging Tube Alloys into the American Manhattan Project, in which many of Britain's top scientists participated. The British government trusted that America would share nuclear technology, which it considered to be a joint discovery, but the United States Atomic Energy Act of 1946 (also known as the McMahon Act) ended technical cooperation. Fearing a resurgence of American isolationism, and the loss of Britain's great power status, the British government resumed its own development effort, which was codenamed "High Explosive Research".

The successful nuclear test of a British atomic bomb in Operation Hurricane in October 1952 represented an extraordinary scientific and technological achievement. Britain became the world's third nuclear power, reaffirming the country's status as a great power, but hopes that the United States would be sufficiently impressed to restore the nuclear Special Relationship were soon dashed. In November 1952, the United States conducted the first successful test of a true thermonuclear device or hydrogen bomb. Britain was therefore still several years behind in nuclear weapons technology. The Defence Policy Committee, chaired by Churchill and consisting of the senior Cabinet members, considered the political and strategic implications in June 1954, and concluded that "we must maintain and strengthen our position as a world power so that Her Majesty's Government can exercise a powerful influence in the counsels of the world." In July 1954, Cabinet agreed to proceed with the development of thermonuclear weapons.

The scientists at the United Kingdom Atomic Energy Authority's Atomic Weapons Establishment at Aldermaston in Berkshire included William Penney, William Cook, Ken Allen, Samuel Curran, Henry Hulme, Bryan Taylor and John Ward. They did not know how to build a hydrogen bomb, but produced three designs: Orange Herald, a large boosted fission weapon; Green Bamboo, an interim thermonuclear design; and Green Granite, a true thermonuclear design. The first series of Operation Grapple tests involved Britain's first airdrop of a thermonuclear bomb. Although hailed as a success at the time, the first test of the Green Granite design was a failure. The second test validated Orange Herald as a usable design of a megaton weapon, but it was not a thermonuclear bomb, and the core boosting did not work. A third test attempted to correct the Green Granite design, but was another failure.

In the Grapple X test in November 1957, they successfully tested a thermonuclear design. The Grapple Y test the following April obtained most of its yield from nuclear fusion, and the Grapple Z test series later that year demonstrated a mastery of thermonuclear weapons technology. An international moratorium on nuclear tests commenced on 31 October 1958, and Britain ceased atmospheric testing for good. The successful development of the hydrogen bomb, along with the Sputnik crisis, resulted in the 1958 US–UK Mutual Defence Agreement, in which the nuclear Special Relationship was restored.

== Background ==
=== Tube Alloys ===
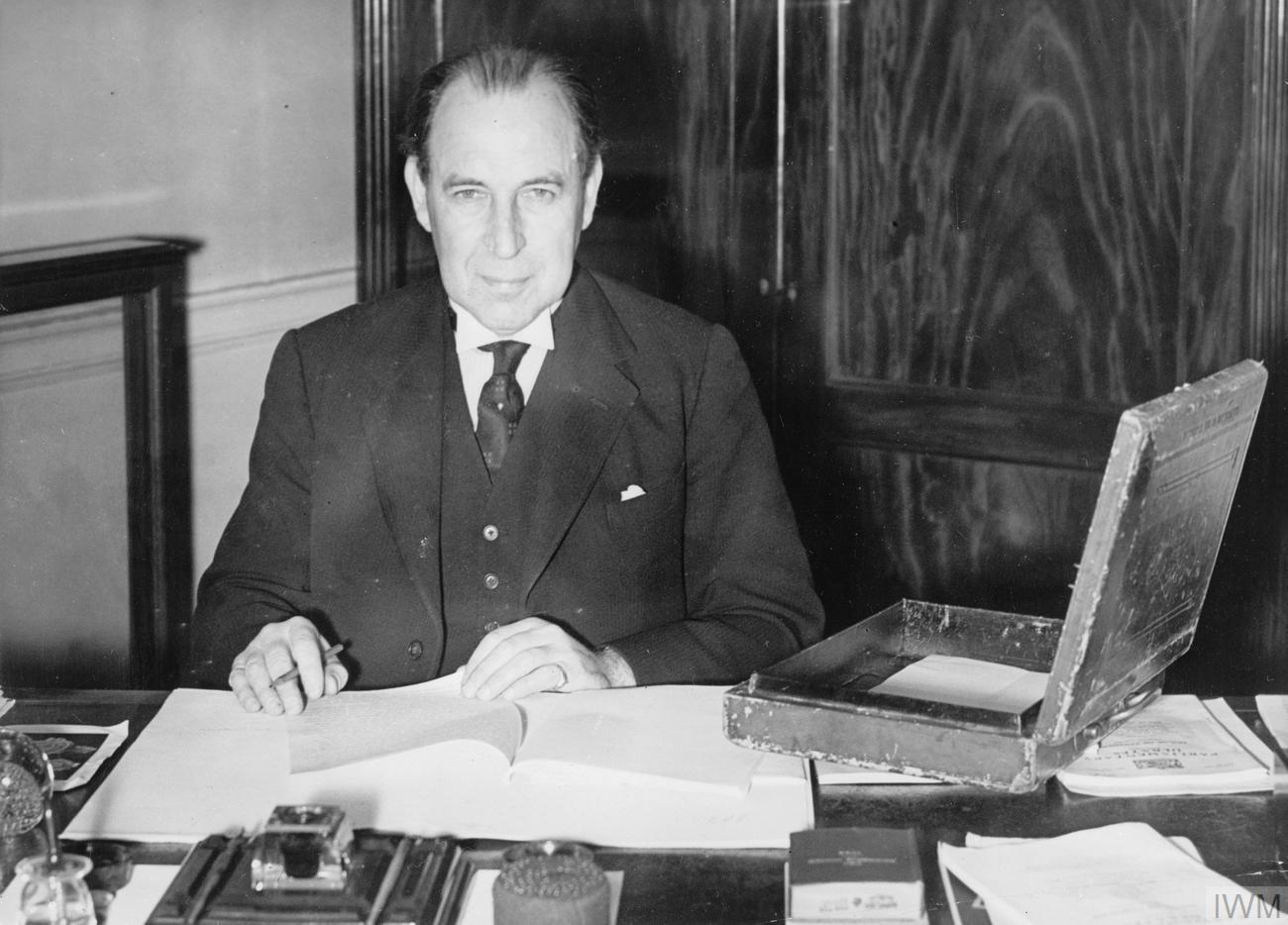
Sir John Anderson, the minister responsible for Tube Alloys

The neutron was discovered by James Chadwick at the Cavendish Laboratory at the University of Cambridge in February 1932, and in April 1932, his Cavendish colleagues John Cockcroft and Ernest Walton split lithium atoms with accelerated protons. In December 1938, Otto Hahn and Fritz Strassmann at Hahn's laboratory in Berlin-Dahlem bombarded uranium with slow neutrons, and discovered that barium had been produced, and therefore that the uranium nucleus had been split. Hahn wrote to his colleague Lise Meitner, who, with her nephew Otto Robert Frisch, developed a theoretical explanation of the process. By analogy with the division of biological cells, they named the process "fission".

The discovery of fission raised the possibility that an extremely powerful atomic bomb could be created. Frisch and Rudolf Peierls, both German refugee scientists working in Britain, calculated the critical mass of a metallic sphere of pure uranium-235, and found that instead of tons, as everyone had assumed, as little as 1 to 10 kilograms (2.2 to 22.0 lb) would suffice, and would explode with the power of thousands of tons of dynamite. The MAUD Committee was established to investigate further. It reported that an atomic bomb was technically feasible, and recommended pursuing its development as a matter of urgency. A new directorate known as Tube Alloys was created to coordinate this effort. Sir John Anderson, the Lord President of the Council, became the minister responsible, and Wallace Akers from Imperial Chemical Industries (ICI) was appointed the director of Tube Alloys.

=== Manhattan Project ===
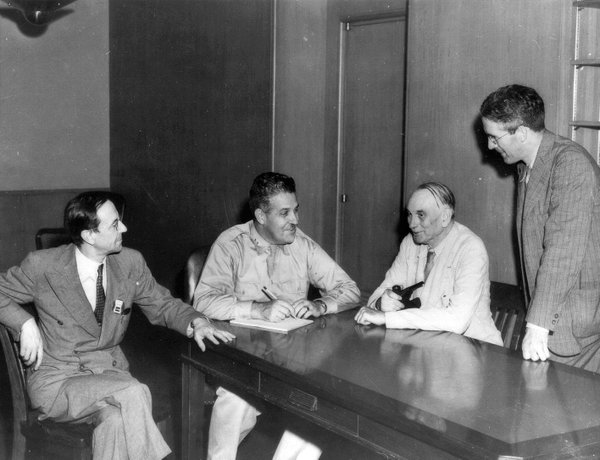
James Chadwick (left), the head of the British Mission, with Major General Leslie R. Groves Jr., the director of the Manhattan Project; Richard C. Tolman, his scientific advisor; and Henry DeWolf Smyth

In July 1940, Britain offered the United States access to its scientific research, and Cockcroft briefed American scientists on British nuclear weapons developments. He discovered that the American S-1 Project (later renamed the Manhattan Project) was smaller than the British, and not as far advanced. The two projects exchanged information, but did not initially combine their efforts, ostensibly over concerns about American security. Unknown to the British, their project had already been penetrated by atomic spies for the Soviet Union.

The United Kingdom did not have the manpower or resources of the United States, and despite its early and promising start, Tube Alloys fell behind its American counterpart. The British considered producing an atomic bomb without American help, but it would require overwhelming priority, disruption to other wartime projects was inevitable, and it was unlikely to be ready in time to affect the outcome of the war in Europe. At the Quebec Conference in August 1943, the Prime Minister, Winston Churchill, and the President of the United States, Franklin Roosevelt, signed the Quebec Agreement, which merged the two national projects. The Quebec Agreement established the Combined Policy Committee and the Combined Development Trust to coordinate their efforts. The 19 September 1944 Hyde Park Agreement extended both commercial and military cooperation into the post-war period.

A British mission led by Akers assisted in the development of gaseous diffusion technology at the SAM Laboratories in New York. Another, headed by Mark Oliphant, assisted with the electromagnetic separation process at the Berkeley Radiation Laboratory. Cockcroft became the director of the joint British-Canadian Montreal Laboratory. A British mission to the Los Alamos Laboratory was led by Chadwick, and later Peierls, which included several of Britain's most eminent scientists. As overall head of the British Mission, Chadwick forged a close and successful partnership, and ensured that British participation was complete and wholehearted.

=== End of American cooperation ===
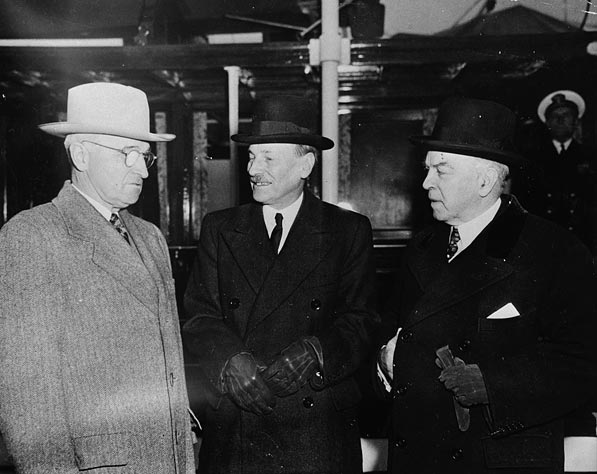
President Harry Truman and prime ministers Clement Attlee and Mackenzie King boarding USS Sequoia for discussions about nuclear weapons, November 1945

With the end of the war the Special Relationship between Britain and the United States became, in the words of Margaret Gowing, "very much less special". The British government had trusted that America would share nuclear technology, which it considered a joint discovery. On 8 August 1945, the Prime Minister, Clement Attlee, sent a message to President Harry Truman in which he referred to both of them as "heads of the Governments which have control of this great force".

On 9 November 1945, Attlee and the Prime Minister of Canada, Mackenzie King, went to Washington, D.C., to confer with Truman about future cooperation in nuclear weapons and nuclear power. A Memorandum of Intention they signed replaced the Quebec Agreement. The three leaders agreed that there would be full and effective cooperation on atomic energy, but British hopes were soon disappointed. The Atomic Energy Act of 1946 (McMahon Act), which was signed into law by Truman on 1 August 1946, ended technical cooperation. Its control of "restricted data" prevented the United States' allies from receiving any information.

This partly resulted from the arrest for espionage of British physicist Alan Nunn May, who had worked in the Montreal Laboratory, in February 1946, while the legislation was being debated. It was but the first of a series of spy scandals. The arrest of Klaus Fuchs in January 1950, and the June 1951 defection of Donald Maclean, who had served as a British member of the Combined Policy Committee from January 1947 to August 1948, left Americans with a distrust of British security arrangements. The remaining British scientists working in the United States were denied access to papers that they had written just days before.

=== Resumption of independent UK efforts ===
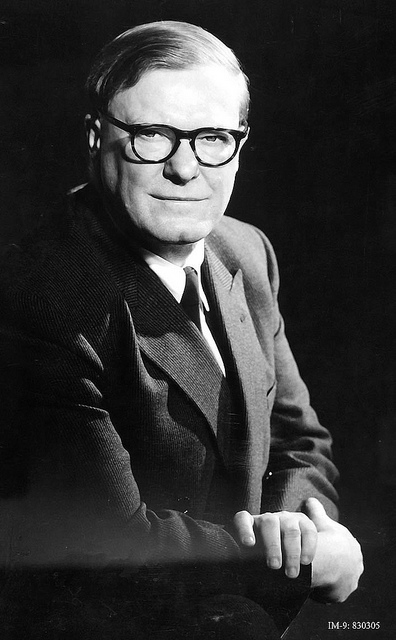
William Penney, Chief Superintendent Armament Research, was in charge of atomic bomb development.

Attlee set up a cabinet sub-committee, the Gen 75 Committee (known informally by Attlee as the "Atomic Bomb Committee"), on 10 August 1945 to examine the feasibility of an independent British nuclear weapons programme. The Chiefs of Staff Committee considered the issue of nuclear weapons in July 1946, and recommended that Britain acquire them. A nuclear reactor and plutonium-processing facility was approved by the Gen 75 committee on 18 December 1945 "with the highest urgency and importance". The decision to proceed was formally made on 8 January 1947 at a meeting of Gen 163, another cabinet subcommittee, and was publicly announced in the House of Commons on 12 May 1948. D notice No. 25 forbid the publication of details on the design, construction or location of atomic weapons. The project was given the cover name "High Explosive Research".

Production facilities were constructed under the direction of Christopher Hinton, who established his headquarters in a former Royal Ordnance Factory at Risley in Lancashire. These included a uranium metal plant at Springfields, nuclear reactors and a plutonium processing plant at Windscale, and a gaseous diffusion uranium enrichment facility at Capenhurst, near Chester. Uranium ore was stockpiled at Springfields. As the American nuclear programme expanded, its requirements became greater than the production of the existing mines. To gain access to the stockpile, they reopened negotiations, which resulted in the 1948 Modus Vivendi, which allowed for consultation on the use of nuclear weapons, and limited sharing of technical information.

As Chief Superintendent Armament Research (CSAR, pronounced "Caesar"), Penney directed bomb design from Fort Halstead. In 1951 his design group moved to a new site at Aldermaston in Berkshire. The first British atomic bomb was successfully tested in Operation Hurricane on 3 October 1952. Britain thereby became the third country to test nuclear weapons. The first Blue Danube atomic bombs were delivered to Bomber Command in November 1953, although the V bombers to deliver them to their targets were not available until 1955. In the meantime, nuclear deterrence was provided by the United States Strategic Air Command, which had begun operating from British bases in 1949.

== Decision ==
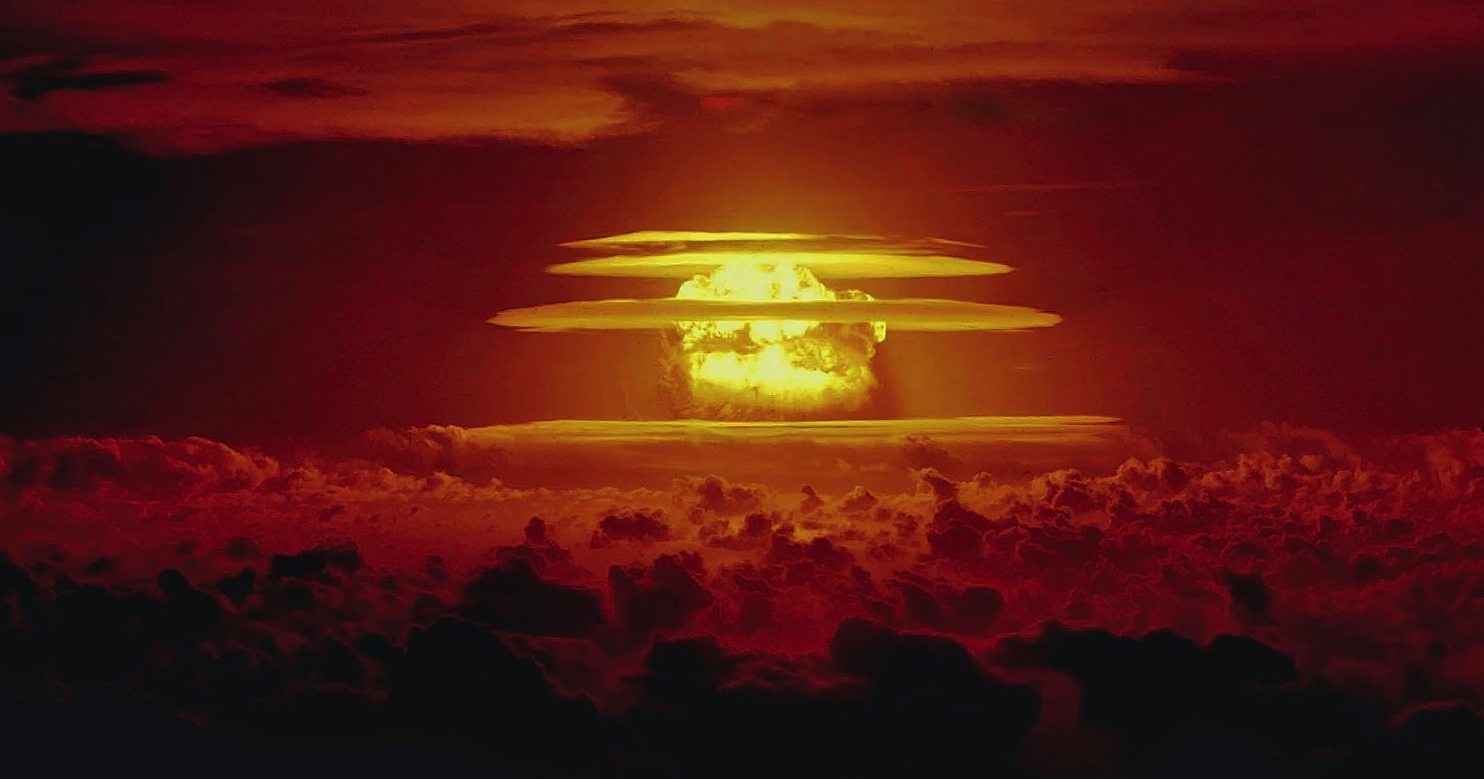
The Castle Bravo test on 1 March 1954 was America's largest test of a hydrogen bomb using solid thermonuclear fuel. Its yield was more than twice what had been expected, and was the largest ever American detonation.

The successful test of an atomic bomb represented an extraordinary scientific and technological achievement. Britain became the world's third nuclear power, reaffirming its status as a great power, but hopes that the United States would be sufficiently impressed to restore the Special Relationship were soon dashed. On 1 November 1952, the United States conducted Ivy Mike, the first successful test of a true thermonuclear device (also known as a hydrogen bomb). Due to its physical size and use of cryogenic liquid deuterium, it was not suitable for use as a deliverable weapon, but the Castle Bravo test on 1 March 1954 used a much smaller device with solid lithium deuteride. Boosted by the nuclear fusion reaction in lithium-7, the yield of 15 megatonnes of TNT (63 PJ) was more than twice what had been expected, and indeed was the largest detonation the Americans would ever carry out. This resulted in widespread radioactive fallout that affected 236 Marshall Islanders, 28 Americans, and the 23 crewmen of a Japanese fishing boat, the Daigo Fukuryū Maru (Lucky Dragon No. 5). Meanwhile, the Soviet Union tested Joe 4, a boosted fission weapon with a yield of 400 kilotonnes of TNT (1,700 TJ) on 12 August 1953. This was followed by Joe 19, a true two-stage thermonuclear weapon on 20 November 1954.

Although the British Hurricane device was more advanced than the American Fat Man bombs of 1946, Britain was still several years behind in nuclear weapons technology, and while British and Soviet advances had taken much of the heat out of American opposition to renewed cooperation with the British, the United States Congress saw little benefit in it for the United States. The McMahon Act was amended by the Atomic Energy Act of 1954 on 30 August, which allowed for greater exchange of information with foreign nations, but it fell far short of what the British government wanted. Churchill, who had replaced Attlee as prime minister, turned to Lord Cherwell for advice on the prospect of producing a British hydrogen bomb. Cherwell reported that "We think we know how to make an H-bomb", but Penney did not agree with this sanguine assessment.

A New Weapons Committee was established at Aldermaston on 15 October 1951 to examine improvements to their atomic bombs. John Corner, the head of the theoretical group at Aldermaston, suggested producing a device in the "megaton range"—one with a yield of 500 kilotonnes of TNT (2,100 TJ) or more. In this he was thinking not of a thermonuclear weapon, but of a large fission one. The idea was not pursued at that time, because the RAF wanted more, not bigger, atomic bombs. Meeting in Bermuda in December 1953 with Dwight D. Eisenhower, who had replaced Truman as president earlier that year, Churchill told him that the RAF had reckoned that fission bombs would be sufficient for most targets, and therefore that Britain had no intention of developing hydrogen bombs.

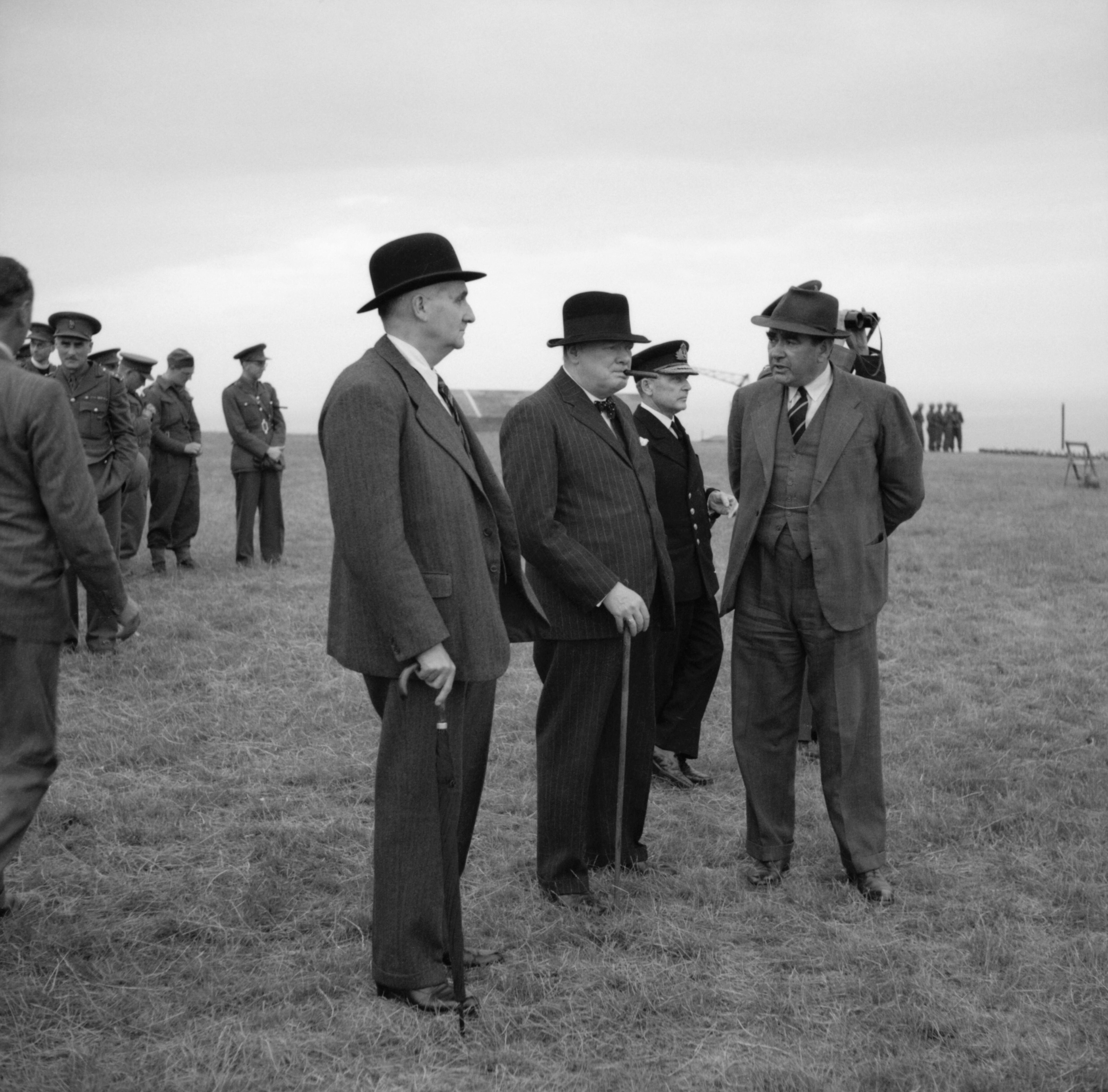
Lord Cherwell (foreground, in bowler hat) was scientific advisor to Winston Churchill (centre).

On 12 and 19 March 1954, Penney briefed the Gen 475 Committee meetings, attended by the Chiefs of Staff, senior officials from the Ministry of Defence and Foreign Office, and Sir Edwin Plowden, about recent developments in thermonuclear weapons. Sir Frederick Brundrett, the chairman of the Chiefs of Staff's Working Party on the Operational Use of Atomic Weapons (OAW), then asked Penney on 25 May for a working paper for an OAW meeting on 31 May. In turn, OAW sent a report to the Chiefs of Staff, who recommended that the United Kingdom develop its own thermonuclear weapons. Admiral of the Fleet Sir Rhoderick McGrigor, the First Sea Lord, recalled that:

The United Kingdom, as the recognised leader of the Commonwealth, and as a leading world power, had a position to maintain in world affairs. If our influence were to decline it would be virtually impossible to regain our rightful place as a world power. It was essential that the United Kingdom should have the ability to produce the H-Bomb in order that she could claim membership of the Allied H-Club.

Thus, it was hoped that the development of thermonuclear weapons would shore up Britain's great power status and restore the special relationship with the United States, which would give the UK a prospect of influencing American defence policy. There was a third political consideration: the Lucky Dragon incident had touched off a storm of protest, and there were calls from trade unions and the Labour Party for a moratorium on nuclear testing, resulting in an acrimonious debate in the House of Commons on 5 April 1954 in which Churchill blamed Attlee for the McMahon Act. The new Eisenhower administration in the United States looked favourably on the idea of a moratorium, and the Foreign Secretary, Anthony Eden, was sounded out about it by the U.S. Secretary of State, John Foster Dulles. The United States had now finished its Operation Castle series of tests, and such a moratorium would restrict further nuclear weapons development by the Soviet Union; but it would also lock the United Kingdom into a permanent state of inferiority.

The Defence Policy Committee, chaired by the Prime Minister and consisting of the senior Cabinet members, considered the political and strategic implications on 1 June, and concluded that "we must maintain and strengthen our position as a world power so that Her Majesty's Government can exercise a powerful influence in the counsels of the world." Churchill informed Cabinet of the decision on 7 July 1954, and they were not happy about not being consulted, particularly the Lord Privy Seal, Harry Crookshank. Cabinet debated the matter that day and the next, before postponing a final decision. On 27 July 1954, the Lord President of the Council, the Marquess of Salisbury, raised the matter, although it was not on the agenda, stressing the need for a decision. This time Cabinet agreed to proceed with the development of thermonuclear weapons.

== Organisation ==
Churchill's return to the prime ministership meant Lord Cherwell's return to the post of Paymaster General. He was a strong supporter of the atomic energy programme, but while he agreed with its size and scope, he was critical of its organisation, which he blamed for slower progress than its Soviet counterpart. In particular, the programme had experienced problems with Civil Service pay and conditions, which were below those for comparable workers in industry. The Treasury had agreed to flexibility in exceptional cases, but the procedure was absurdly slow. Hinton in particular was concerned at the low remuneration his senior staff were receiving compared to those with similar responsibilities at ICI. When he attempted to bring Frank Kearton in as his successor, the Treasury refused to adjust the salaries of his other two deputies to match. Rather than ruin his organisation's morale, Hinton had dropped the proposal to appoint Kearton. Nor could any reorganisation be carried out without Treasury approval. Within a month of assuming office, Cherwell had prepared a memorandum proposing that responsibility for the program be transferred from the Ministry of Supply to an Atomic Energy Commission.

Cherwell managed to persuade Churchill to propose to Cabinet that a small committee be established to examine the matter. Cabinet agreed at a meeting in November 1952, and the committee was created, chaired by Crookshank. Cabinet accepted its recommendations in April 1953, and another committee was established under Anderson (now Lord Waverley) to make recommendations on the implementation of the new organisation and its structure. The Atomic Energy Authority Act 1954 created the United Kingdom Atomic Energy Authority (UKAEA) on 19 July 1954. Plowden became its first chairman. His fellow board members were Hinton, who was in charge of the Industrial Group at Risley; Cockcroft, who headed the Research Group at Harwell; and Penney, who led the Weapons Group at Aldermaston. The UKAEA initially reported to Salisbury in his capacity as Lord President of the Council; later in the decade the UKAEA would report directly to the Prime Minister. Over 20,000 staff transferred to the UKAEA; by the end of the decade, their numbers had grown to nearly 41,000.

Like Hinton, Penney had difficulty recruiting and retaining the highly skilled staff he needed. In particular, he wanted a deputy with a strong scientific background. An approach to Vivian Bowden failed. After Penney repeatedly asked for William Cook, Salisbury managed to persuade McGrigor to release Cook from the Admiralty to be Penney's deputy. Cook commenced work at Aldermaston on 1 September 1954. Henry Hulme joined in 1954. He was too senior to be placed in Corner's theoretical physics division, so he became an assistant to Penney, with special responsibility for the hydrogen bomb programme. Samuel Curran, who had worked on the Manhattan Project in Berkeley, became head of the radiation measurements division. The physicist John Ward was also recruited at this time.

== Development ==
British knowledge of thermonuclear weapons was based on work done at the Los Alamos Laboratory during the war. Two British scientists, Bretscher and Fuchs, had attended the conference there on the Super (as it was then called) in April 1946, and Chadwick had written a secret report on it in May 1946. The Classic Super design was unsuccessful. Fuchs and John von Neumann had produced an ingenious alternative design, for which they filed a patent in May 1946. This was tested in the American Operation Greenhouse George test in May 1951, but was also found to be unworkable. There was also some intelligence about Joe 4 derived from its debris, which was provided to Britain under the 1948 Modus Vivendi. Penney established three megaton bomb projects at Aldermaston: Orange Herald, under Bryan Taylor, a large boosted fission weapon; Green Bamboo, an interim thermonuclear design similar to the Soviet Layer Cake used in Joe 4 and the American Alarm Clock; and Green Granite, a true thermonuclear design. Orange Herald would be the first British weapon to incorporate an external neutron initiator.

For Green Granite, Penney proposed a design based on radiation implosion and staging. There would be three stages, which he called Tom, Dick and Harry. Tom, the primary stage, would be a fission bomb. It would produce radiation to implode a secondary, Dick, another fission device. In turn, it would implode Harry, a thermonuclear tertiary. Henceforth, the British designers would refer to Tom, Dick and Harry rather than primary, secondary and tertiary. They still had only vague ideas about how a thermonuclear weapon would work, and whether one, two, or three stages would be required. Nor was there much more certainty about the boosted designs, with no agreement on whether the boosting thermonuclear fuel was best placed inside the hollow core, as in Orange Herald, or wrapped around it, as in Green Bamboo. Keith Roberts and John Ward studied the detonation waves in a thermonuclear detonation, but there was an incomplete understanding of radiation implosion.

Additional information came from the study of Joe 19. It was found that there was a large amount of residual uranium-233. The Soviet scientists had used this isotope so they could distinguish the behaviour of uranium in different parts of the system. This clarified that it was a two-stage device. Hulme prepared a paper in January 1956. At this point there were still three stages, Dick being a fission device and Harry the thermonuclear component. Two weeks later, Ken Allen produced a paper in which he described the mechanism of thermonuclear burning. He suggested that the Americans had compressed lithium-6 and uranium around a fissile core. In April 1956, the recognisable ancestor of the later devices appeared. There were now only two stages: Tom, the fission primary; and Dick, which was now also a set of concentric spheres, with uranium-235 and lithium-6 deuteride shells. A spherical Dick was chosen in preference to a cylindrical one for ease of calculation; work on a cylindrical Dick was postponed until a new IBM 704 computer arrived from the United States.

Nuclear weapon design concepts
The Orange Herald boosted core design was a set of concentric spheres. Tritium and deuterium gas (green) was placed inside the uranium-235 core (dark blue), which was enclosed by a uranium-238 tamper. Explosives (orange) imploded it.

In the Green Bamboo boosted core design, solid lithium-6 deuteride (green) was placed between the uranium-235 core (dark blue) and a uranium-238 tamper. There were multiple layers of these. Explosives (orange) imploded it.

In the Green Granite design, the secondary (Dick) is also a set of concentric spheres. The lithium-6 deuteride (green) was placed around the uranium-235 core (dark blue) which was enclosed by a uranium-235 tamper. The design used in the Grapple 1 and 3 tests had fourteen layers; the one used in Grapple X had just three. It was imploded by the fission Tom.

== Testing ==
=== Preparations ===
Implicit in the creation of a hydrogen bomb was that it would be tested. Eden, who replaced Churchill as prime minister after the latter's retirement, gave a radio broadcast in which he declared: "You cannot prove a bomb until it has exploded. Nobody can know whether it is effective or not until it has been tested."

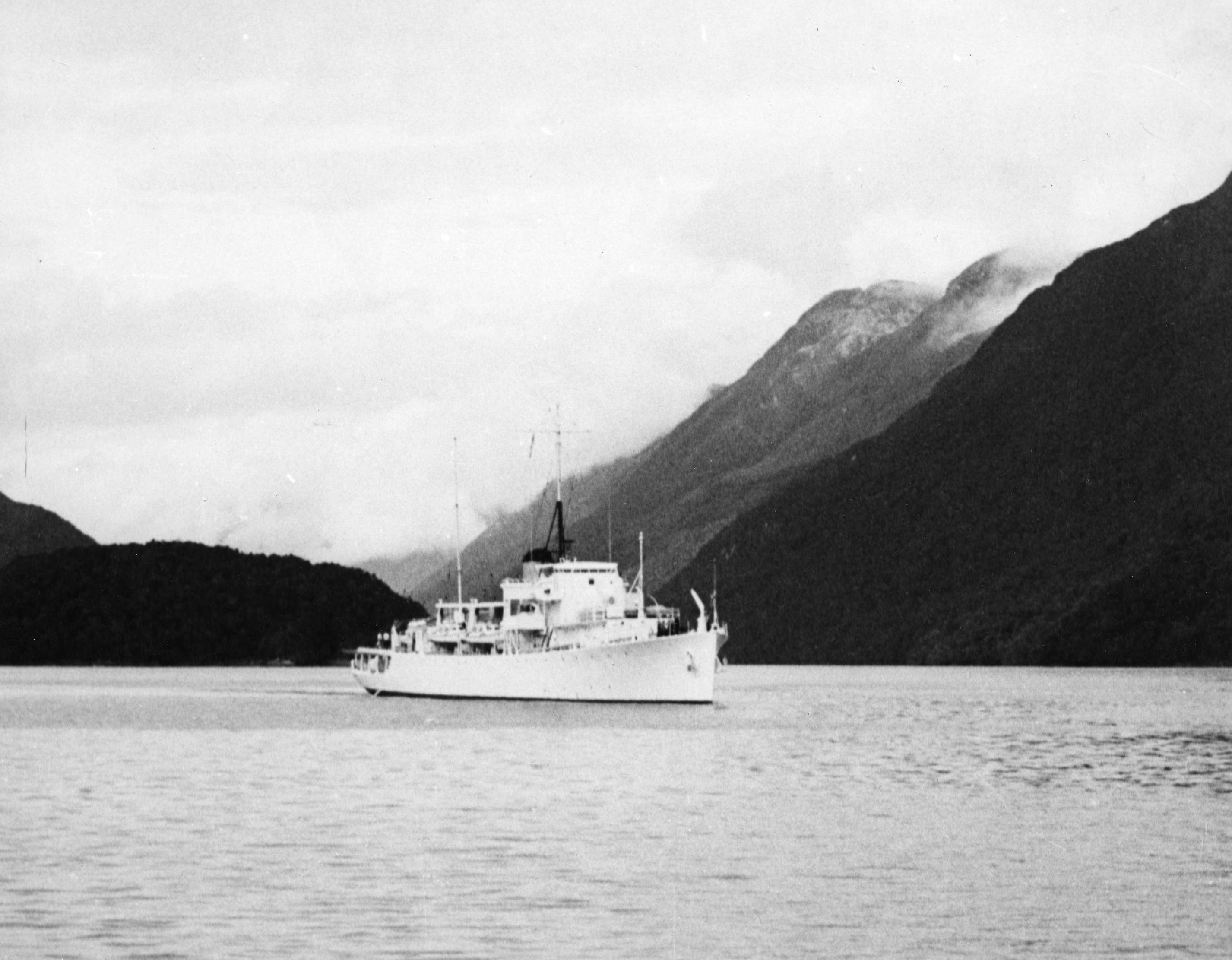
The survey ship HMNZS Lachlan

Testing of boosted designs was carried out by Operation Mosaic in the Monte Bello Islands in Western Australia in May and June 1956. This was a sensitive matter; there was an agreement with Australia that no thermonuclear testing would be carried out there. The Australian Minister for Supply Howard Beale, responding to rumours reported in the newspapers, asserted that "the Federal Government has no intention of allowing any, hydrogen bomb tests to take place in Australia. Nor has it any intention of allowing any experiments connected with hydrogen bomb tests to take place here." Since the tests were connected with hydrogen bomb development, this prompted Eden to cable the Prime Minister of Australia, Robert Menzies, detailing the nature and purpose of the tests. He promised that the yield of the second, larger test would not be more than two and a half times that of the Operation Hurricane test, which was 25 kilotonnes of TNT (100 TJ). Menzies cabled his approval of the tests on 20 June 1955. The yield of the second test turned out to be 60 kilotonnes of TNT (250 TJ), which was larger than the limit of 50 kilotonnes of TNT (210 TJ) for tests in Australia.

Another test site was therefore required. For safety and security reasons, in light of the Lucky Dragon incident, a large site remote from population centres was required. Various remote islands in the South Pacific and Southern Oceans were considered, along with Antarctica. The Admiralty suggested the Antipodes Islands, which are about 860 kilometres (530 mi) southeast of New Zealand. In May 1955, the Minister for Defence, Selwyn Lloyd, concluded that the Kermadec Islands, which lie about 1,000 kilometres (620 mi) northeast of New Zealand, would be suitable. They were part of New Zealand, so Eden wrote to the Prime Minister of New Zealand, Sidney Holland, to ask for permission to use the islands. Holland refused, fearing an adverse public reaction in forthcoming elections. Despite reassurances and pressure from the British government, Holland remained firm. The search for a location continued, with Malden Island and McKean Island being considered. The former became the frontrunner. Three Avro Shackletons from No. 240 Squadron RAF were sent to conduct an aerial reconnaissance and Holland agreed to send the survey ship HMNZS Lachlan to conduct a maritime survey.

The test series was given the secret codename "Operation Grapple". Air Commodore Wilfrid Oulton was appointed task force commander, with the acting rank of air vice marshal from 1 March 1956. He had a formidable task ahead of him. Nearby Christmas Island was chosen as a base. It was claimed by both Britain and the United States, but the Americans were willing to let the British use it for the tests. With pressure mounting at home and abroad for a moratorium on testing, 1 April 1957 was set as the target date. Oulton held the first meeting of the Grapple Executive Committee on New Oxford Street in London on 21 February 1956. The RAF and Royal Engineers would improve the airfield to enable it to operate large, heavily loaded aircraft, and the port and facilities would be improved to enable Christmas Island to operate as a base by 1 December 1956. It was estimated that 18,640 measurement tons (21,110 m^{3}) of stores would be required for the construction effort alone. The tank landing ship HMS Narvik would reprise the role of control ship it had for Operation Hurricane; but as it was also required for Operation Mosaic, it had very little time to return to the Chatham Dockyard for a refit before heading out to Christmas Island for Operation Grapple.

Having decided on a location and date, there still remained the matter of what would be tested. John Challens, whose weapons electronics group would have to produce the assembly, wanted to know the configuration of Green Granite. Cook ruled that it would use a Red Beard Tom, and would fit inside a Blue Danube casing for dropping. The design was frozen in April 1956. There were two versions of Orange Herald, large and small. They had similar cores, but the large version contained more explosive. The designs were frozen in July. Green Bamboo was also nominally frozen, but tinkering with the design continued. On 3 September, Corner suggested that Green Granite could be made smaller by moving the Tom and Dick closer together. This design became known as Short Granite. By January 1957, with the tests just months away, a tentative schedule had emerged. Short Granite would be fired first. Green Bamboo would follow if Short Granite was unsuccessful, but be omitted as unnecessary otherwise. Orange Herald (small) would be fired next. Because Short Granite was too large to fit into a missile or guided bomb, this would occur whether or not Short Granite was a success. Finally, Green Granite would be tested. In December 1956, Cook had proposed another design, known as Green Granite II. This was smaller than Green Granite I, and could fit into a Yellow Sun casing that could be used by the Blue Steel guided missile then under development; but it could not be made ready to reach Christmas Island before 26 June 1957, and extending Operation Grapple would have cost another £1.5 million.

=== First series ===
The first test of the series was Grapple 1, of Short Granite. This bomb was dropped from a height of 14,000 metres (45,000 ft) by a Vickers Valiant bomber of No. 49 Squadron RAF piloted by Wing Commander Kenneth Hubbard, off the shore of Malden Island at 11:38 local time on 15 May 1957. It was Britain's second airdrop of a nuclear bomb after the Operation Buffalo test at Maralinga on 11 October 1956, and the first of a thermonuclear weapon. The United States had not attempted an airdrop of a hydrogen bomb until the Operation Redwing Cherokee test on 21 May 1956. Their bomb had landed 6.4 kilometres (4 mi) from the target; Hubbard missed by just 382 metres (418 yd). The Short Granite's yield was estimated at 300 kilotonnes of TNT (1,300 TJ), far below its designed capability. Penney cancelled the Green Granite test and substituted a new weapon codenamed Purple Granite. This was identical to Short Granite, but with some minor modification to it; additional uranium-235 was added, and the outer layer was replaced with aluminium. Despite its failure, the test was described as a successful thermonuclear explosion, and the government did not confirm or deny reports that the UK had become a third thermonuclear power. When documents on the series were declassified in the 1990s, the tests were denounced as a hoax, but the reports were unlikely to have fooled the American observers.

The Grapple 2 test, as reported by Universal International Newsreel. Orange Herald is described as a hydrogen bomb.

The next test was Grapple 2, of Orange Herald (small). This bomb was dropped at 10:44 local time on 31 May by another 49 Squadron Valiant, piloted by Squadron Leader Dave Roberts. It exploded with a force of 720 to 800 kilotonnes of TNT (3,000 to 3,300 TJ). The yield was the largest ever achieved by a single stage device, and made it technically a megaton weapon, but it was close to Corner's estimate for an unboosted yield, and Hulme doubted that the lithium-6 deuteride had contributed at all. This was chalked up to Taylor instability, which limited the compression of the light elements in the core. The bomb was hailed as a hydrogen bomb, and the truth that it was actually a large fission bomb was kept secret by the British government until the end of the Cold War.

An Operational Requirement (OR1142) had been issued in 1955 for a thermonuclear warhead for a medium-range ballistic missile, which became Blue Streak. This was revised in November 1955, with "megaton" replacing "thermonuclear". Orange Herald (small) could then meet the requirement. A version was created as an interim megaton weapon in order to provide the RAF with one at the earliest possible date. Codenamed Green Grass, the unsuccessful fusion boosting was omitted, and it used Green Bamboo's 72-lens implosion system instead of Orange Herald's 32. This allowed the amount of highly enriched uranium to be reduced from 120 kilograms (260 lb) to 75 kilograms (165 lb). Its yield was estimated at 0.5 megatonnes of TNT (2.1 PJ). It was placed in a Blue Danube casing, and this bomb became known as Violet Club. About ten were delivered before Yellow Sun became available.

The third and final shot of the series was Grapple 3, the test of Purple Granite. This was dropped by a Valiant piloted by Squadron Leader Arthur Steele on 19 June. The yield was a very disappointing 300 kilotonnes of TNT (1,300 TJ), even less than Short Granite. The changes had not worked. "We haven't got it right", Cook told a flabbergasted Oulton. "We shall have to do it all again, providing we can do so before the ban comes into force; so that means as soon as possible."

=== Second series ===
A re-think was required. Cook had the unenviable task of explaining the failure to the government. Henceforth, he would take a tighter grip on the hydrogen bomb programme, gradually superseding Penney. The scientists and politicians considered abandoning Green Granite. The Minister of Defence, Duncan Sandys, queried Cook on the imperative to persist with thermonuclear designs, given that Orange Herald satisfied most military requirements, and the tests were very expensive. Cook replied that megaton-range fission bombs represented an uneconomical use of expensive fissile material, that they could not be built to produce yields of more than a megaton, and that they could not be made small enough to be carried by aircraft smaller than the V-bombers, or on missiles. Sandys was not convinced, but he authorised further tests, as did the Prime Minister, now Harold Macmillan following Eden's resignation in the wake of the Suez Crisis. The earliest possible date was November 1957 unless the Operation Antler tests were cancelled, but the Foreign Office warned that a moratorium on nuclear testing might come into effect in late October.

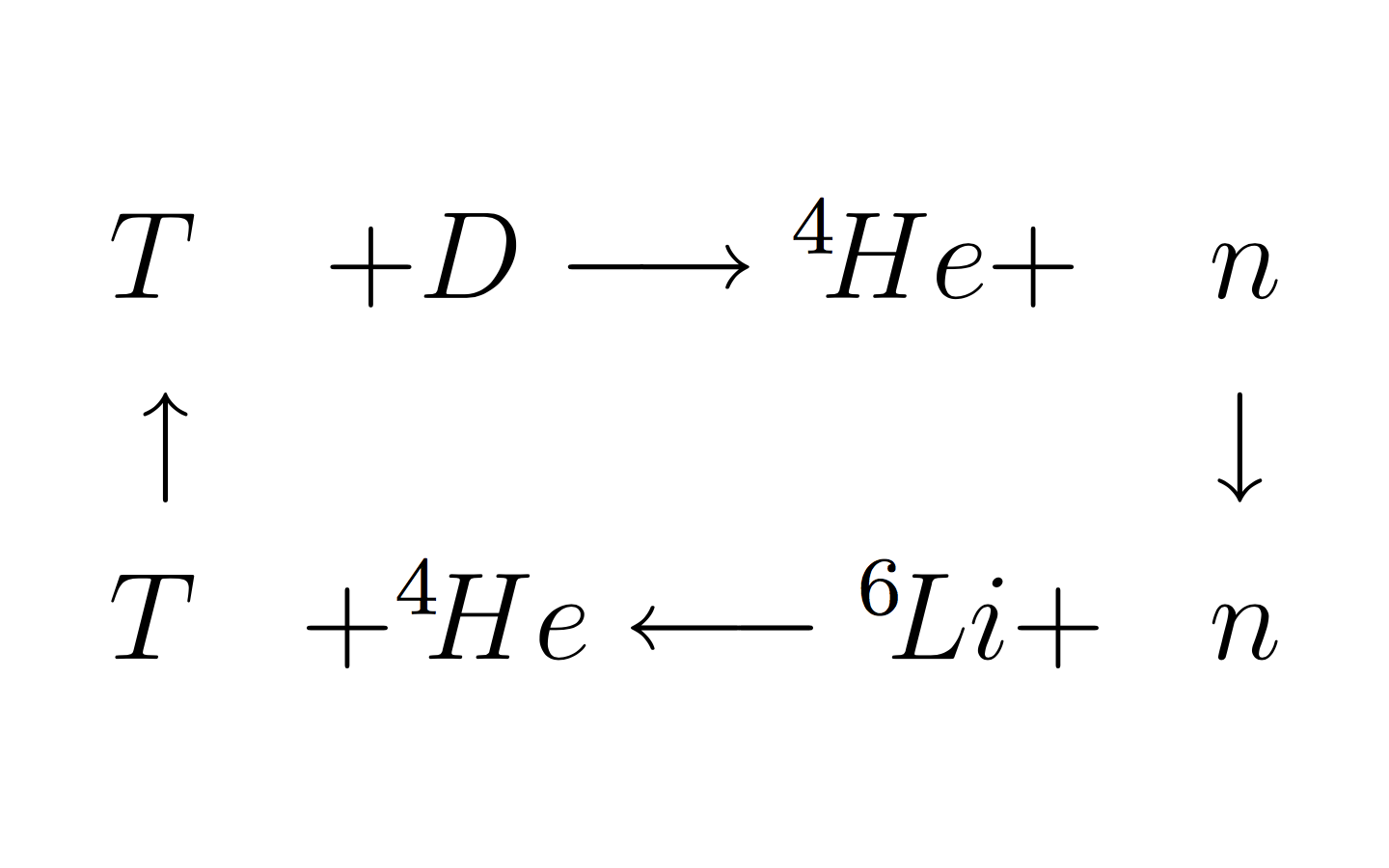
Hydrogen bombs produce tritium in situ and thus burn deuterium and lithium. Under conditions of sufficient temperature and pressure the reactions form a loop chain reaction known as Jetter's Cycle.

The scientists at Aldermaston had created a design incorporating staging, radiation implosion, and compression, but they had not mastered the design of thermonuclear weapons. Knowing that much of the yield of American and Soviet bombs came from fission in the uranium-238 tamper, they had focused on what they called the "lithium-uranium cycle", whereby neutrons from the fission of uranium would trigger fusion, which would produce more neutrons to induce fission in the tamper. However, this is not the most important reaction. Corner and his theoretical physicists at Aldermaston argued that Green Granite could be made to work by increasing compression and reducing Taylor instability. The first step would be achieved with an improved Tom. The Red Beard Tom was given an improved high explosive supercharge, a composite (uranium-235 and plutonium) core, and a beryllium tamper, thereby increasing its yield to 45 kilotonnes of TNT (190 TJ). The Dick was greatly simplified; instead of the 14 layers in Short Granite, it would have just three. This was called Round A; a five-layer version was also discussed, which was called Round B. A third round, Round C, was produced, for diagnostics. It had the same three layers as Round A, but an inert layer instead of lithium deuteride. Calculations for Round B were performed on the new IBM 704, while the old Ferranti Mark 1 was used for the simpler Round A.

The next trial was known as Grapple X. To save time and money, and as Narvik and the light aircraft carrier HMS Warrior were unavailable, the bomb would be dropped off the southern tip of Christmas Island rather than off Malden Island, just 20 nautical miles (37 km; 23 mi) from the airfield where 3,000 men would be based. This required a major construction effort to improve the facilities on Christmas Island, and those that had been constructed on Malden Island had to now be duplicated on Christmas Island. Works included 26 blast-proof shelters, a control room, and tented accommodation. Components of Rounds A and C were delivered to Christmas Island on 24, 27 and 29 October. Round B would not be available; to get the calculations for Round A completed, the IBM 704 had to be turned over to them, and there was no possibility of completing the Round B calculations on the Ferranti. On inspection, a fault was found in the Round A Tom, and the fissile core was replaced with the one from Round C.

Round A was dropped by a Valiant bomber piloted by Squadron Leader Barney Millett at 08:47 on 8 November 1957. This time the yield of 1.8 megatonnes of TNT (7.5 PJ) exceeded expectations; the predicted yield had only been 1 megatonne of TNT (4.2 PJ). But it was still below the 2 megatonnes of TNT (8.4 PJ) safety limit. This was the real hydrogen bomb Britain wanted, but it used a relatively large quantity of expensive highly enriched uranium. Due to the higher-than-expected yield of the explosion, there was some damage to buildings, the fuel storage tanks, and helicopters on the island.

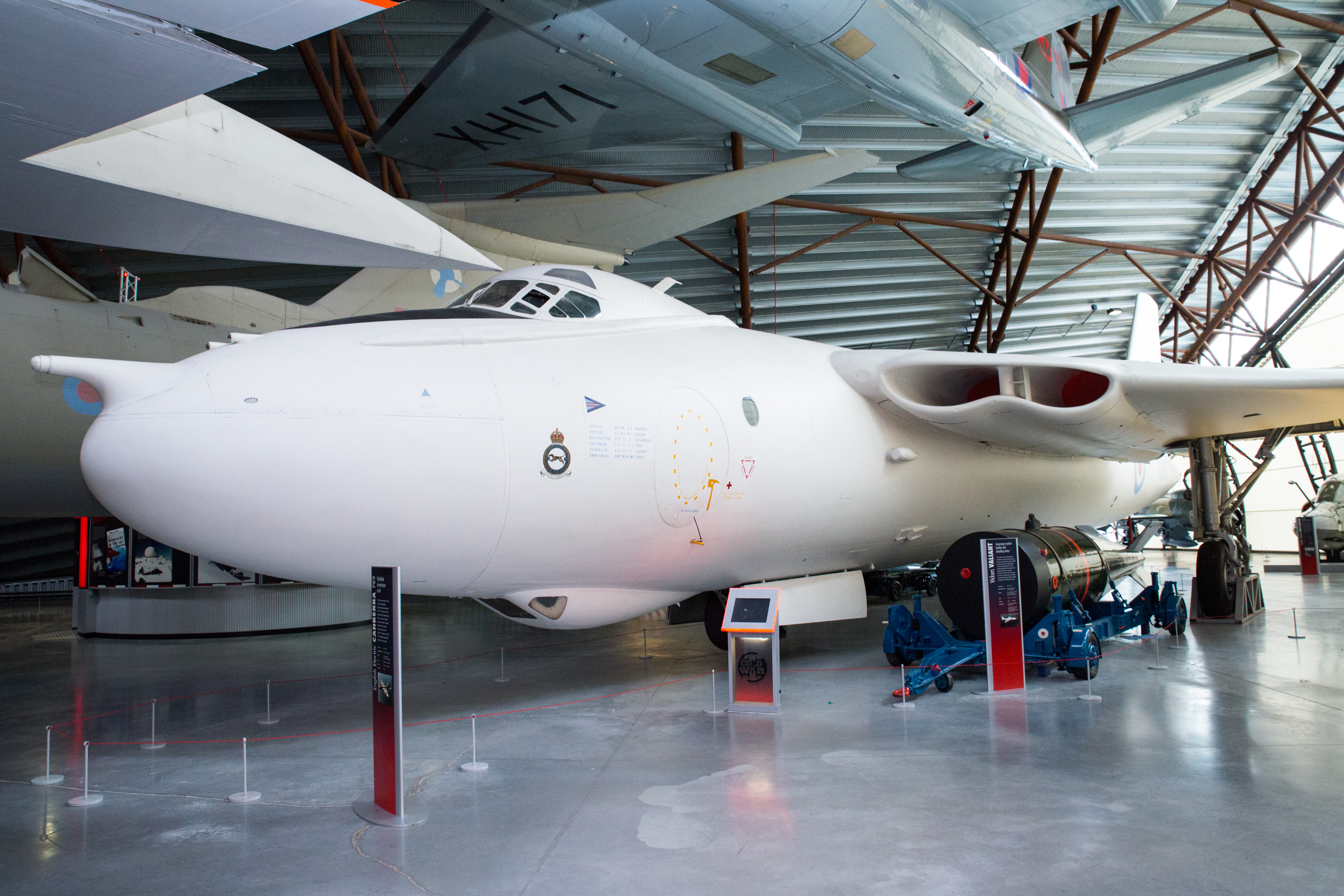
Vickers Valiant XD818 at the Royal Air Force Museum Midlands was the aircraft that dropped the bomb in the Grapple 1 test in May 1957.

The physicists at Aldermaston had plenty of ideas about how to follow up Grapple X. Possibilities were discussed in September 1957. One was to tinker with the width of the shells in the Dick to find an optimal configuration. If they were too thick, they would slow the neutrons generated by the fusion reaction; if they were too thin, they would give rise to Taylor instability. Another was to do away with the shells entirely and use a mixture of uranium-235, uranium-238 and deuterium. Ken Allen had an idea, which Sam Curran supported, of a three-layer Dick that used lithium deuteride that was less enriched in lithium-6 (and therefore had more lithium-7), but more of it, reducing the amount of uranium-235 in the centre of the core. This proposal was the one adopted in October, and it became known as "Dickens" because it used Ken's Dick. The device would otherwise be similar to Round A, but with a larger radiation case. The safety limit was again set to 2 megatonnes of TNT (8.4 PJ). Keith Roberts calculated that the yield could reach 3 megatonnes of TNT (13 PJ), and suggested that this could be reduced by modifying the tamper, but Cook opposed this, fearing that it might cause the test to fail. Because of the possibility of a moratorium on testing, plans for the test, codenamed Grapple Y, were restricted to the Prime Minister, who gave verbal approval, and a handful of officials.

Air Vice Marshal John Grandy succeeded Oulton as Task Force commander. The bomb was dropped off Christmas at 10:05 local time on 28 April 1958 by a Valiant piloted by Squadron Leader Bob Bates. It had an explosive yield of about 3 megatonnes of TNT (13 PJ), and remains the largest British nuclear weapon ever tested. The design of Grapple Y was successful because much of its yield came from its thermonuclear reaction instead of fission of a heavy uranium-238 tamper, making it a true hydrogen bomb, and because its yield had been closely predicted—indicating that its designers understood what they were doing.

On 22 August 1958, Eisenhower announced a moratorium on nuclear testing, effective 31 October 1958. This did not mean an immediate end to testing; on the contrary, the United States, the Soviet Union and the United Kingdom all rushed to perform as much testing as possible before the deadline, which the Soviets did not meet, conducting tests on 1 and 3 November. A new British test series, known as Grapple Z, commenced on 22 August. It explored new technologies such as the use of external neutron initiators, which had first been tried out with Orange Herald. Core boosting using tritium gas and external boosting with layers of lithium deuteride were successfully tested in the Pendant and Burgee tests, allowing a smaller, lighter Tom for two-stage devices. The international moratorium commenced on 31 October 1958, and Britain ceased atmospheric testing for good.

== Renewed American partnership ==
British timing was good. The Soviet Union's launch of Sputnik 1, the world's first artificial satellite, on 4 October 1957, came as a tremendous shock to the American public, who had trusted that American technological superiority ensured their invulnerability. Now, suddenly, there was incontrovertible proof that, in some areas at least, the Soviet Union was actually ahead. In the widespread calls for action in response to the Sputnik crisis, officials in the United States and Britain seized an opportunity to mend the relationship with Britain that had been damaged by the Suez Crisis. At the suggestion of Harold Caccia, the British Ambassador to the United States, Macmillan wrote to Eisenhower on 10 October urging that the two countries pool their resources to meet the challenge. To do this, the McMahon Act's restrictions on nuclear cooperation needed to be relaxed. British information security, or the lack thereof, no longer seemed so important now that the Soviet Union was apparently ahead, and the United Kingdom had independently developed the hydrogen bomb. The trenchant opposition from the Joint Committee on Atomic Energy that had derailed previous attempts was absent. Amendments to the Atomic Energy Act of 1954 passed Congress on 30 June 1958, and were signed into law by Eisenhower on 2 July 1958. The 1958 US–UK Mutual Defence Agreement was signed on 3 July, and was approved by Congress on 30 July. Macmillan called this "the Great Prize".

The United States Atomic Energy Commission (AEC) invited the British government to send representatives to a series of meetings in Washington, DC, on 27 and 28 August 1958 to work out the details. The U.S. delegation included Willard Libby, AEC deputy chairman; Major General Herbert Loper, the Assistant to the Secretary of Defence for Atomic Energy Affairs; Brigadier General Alfred Starbird, AEC Director of Military Applications; Norris Bradbury, director of the Los Alamos National Laboratory; Edward Teller, director of the Lawrence Livermore Laboratory; and James W. McCrae, president of the Sandia Corporation. The British representatives were Brundrett and J.H.B. Macklen from the Ministry of Defence, and Penney, Cook and E. F. Newly from Aldermaston. The Americans disclosed the details of nine of their nuclear weapon designs: the Mark 7, Mark 15/39, Mark 19, Mark 25, Mark 27, Mark 28, Mark 31, Mark 33 and Mark 34. In return, the British provided the details of seven of theirs, including Green Grass; Pennant, the boosted device which had been detonated in the Grapple Z test on 22 August; Flagpole, the two-stage device scheduled for 2 September; Burgee, scheduled for 23 September; and the three-stage Haillard 3. The Americans were impressed with the British designs, particularly with Haillard 1, the heavier version of Haillard 3. Cook therefore changed the Grapple Z programme to fire Haillard 1 instead of Haillard 3. Macmillan wrote to Plowden:

I had a very interesting talk with Brundrett, Penney and Cook about their discussions in Washington last week, and I have been very impressed by the results which they have achieved. It is clear that the Americans were amazed to learn how much we already know and this was a major factor in convincing them that we could be trusted with more information than they probably intended originally to give us. I hope that these discussions will be only the first of a series, in which Anglo-American cooperation in this field will become progressively closer. But if we do succeed in gradually persuading the Americans to regard the enterprise as a joint project in which we are entitled to be regarded as equal partners in terms of basic knowledge, it will be because we have got off to a flying start under the bilateral agreement; and the credit for that must go to the team of scientists and technicians who have enabled us, single-handed, to keep virtually abreast of the United States in this complex and intricate business of nuclear weapons development. It is a tremendous achievement, of which they have every right to be very proud.

The Anglo-American Special Relationship proved mutually beneficial, although it was never one of equals; the United States was far larger than Britain both militarily and economically. Britain soon became dependent on the United States for its nuclear weapons, as it lacked the resources to produce a range of designs. The British decided to adapt the Mark 28 as a British weapon as a cheaper alternative to doing their own development, which became Red Snow. Other weapons were supplied through Project E, under which weapons in American custody were supplied for the use of the RAF and British Army. Nuclear material was also acquired from the United States. Under the Mutual Defence Agreement 5.4 tonnes of UK-produced plutonium was sent to the US in return for 6.7 kilograms (15 lb) of tritium and 7.5 tonnes of highly enriched uranium between 1960 and 1979, replacing Capenhurst production, although much of the highly enriched uranium was used not for weapons, but as fuel for the growing UK fleet of nuclear submarines. The British ultimately acquired entire weapons systems, with the UK Polaris programme and Trident nuclear programme using American missiles with British nuclear warheads.
