= Kenneth Allen (physicist) =

English nuclear physicist

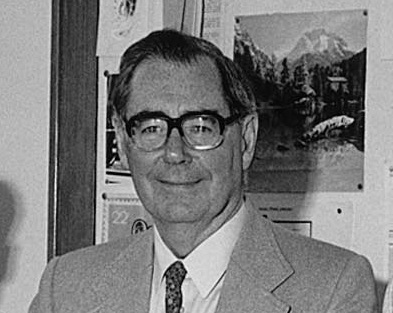
- Born: 17 November 1923
- Died: 2 May 1997
- Education: Queen Mary University of London, St Catharine's College, University of London
- Scientific career
- Workplaces: Atomic Energy of Canada Limited; University of Liverpool; University of Oxford; United Kingdom Atomic Energy Authority
- Thesis: Some investigations with fast neutrons
- Doctoral students: Elspeth Garman

Kenneth William Allen (17 November 1923 – 2 May 1997) was an English nuclear physicist. He was a professor of nuclear physics at the University of Oxford, England. The Independent stated that "Allen will be best remembered for his outstanding contributions to nuclear structure physics and for his advocacy of the use of electrostatic nuclear accelerators in other areas of science. Accelerators – otherwise known as "atom smashers" – are machines used for studying nuclear reactions by creating beams of high-energy particles."

Kenneth Allen was educated at: Ilford County High School; University of London (Drapers' Scholar); St Catharine's College, Cambridge (PhD (Cantab) 1947).

== Atomic Weapons Research Establishment ==
Ken Allen was joined Atomic Weapons Research Establishment (AWRE), Aldermaston in September 1954 to create a new nuclear physics team as the nuclear data provided by Atomic Energy Research Establishment (AERE), Harwell was inadequate for thermonuclear weapons research. As a condition of recruitment, Allen shrewdly required that at least half of his research be in unclassified and publishable work, and made significant contributions to nuclear cross sections.

In early 1956, Allen published an internal note in which he deduced the secret of the Teller-Ulam staged thermonuclear bomb concept from radiochemical analysis of American nuclear weapon debris and the most recent nuclear data from his team. This led to AWRE quickly solving the main theoretical problems of thermonuclear weapons and allowed AWRE to begin designing Britain’s first thermonuclear weapon Short Granite. Though the Short Granite device and its follow up Purple Granite tested in Operation Grapple were failures, the results confirmed that AWRE were on the right track with the radiation implosion concept proposed by Allen.

Before the successful test of the 1,800 kilotonnes of TNT (7,500 TJ) Round A device in Grapple X on 8 November 1957, Allen proposed a thermonuclear concept that used "a lot more lithium-7" and less Uranium-235. The concept was described as "brilliant and innovative" by historian Lorna Arnold, but the deputy director of AWRE William Cook had no other option other than to choose a far more conservative design after two failed previous attempts at designing a thermonuclear weapon. But in the follow up test Grapple Y on 28 April 1958, Allen's concept was tested in a device named Dickens, producing a yield of 3,000 kilotonnes of TNT (13,000 TJ), a yield never surpassed by any other British nuclear test.

Allen's work on thermonuclear weapons continued with the Flagpole device tested in Grapple Z2 on 2 September 1958, which was a scaled down version of the Dickens device and produced a yield of 1,210 kilotonnes of TNT (5,100 TJ).

Following the US–UK Mutual Defence Agreement in 1958 which allowed Britain to obtain detailed weapon design information from the United States, work at AWRE shifted from nuclear physics and fundamental science, to engineering and materials sciences. Disappointed by this change, Allen later transferred to UKAEA Culham before returning to academic work in Oxford.

== Career ==
- Physics Division, Atomic Energy of Canada, Chalk River, 1947–1951
- Leverhulme Research Fellow and Lecturer, Liverpool University, 1951–1954
- Deputy chief scientist, United Kingdom Atomic Energy Authority, 1954–1963
- Professor of nuclear structure, 1963–1991, professor emeritus, from 1991, and head of Department of Nuclear Physics, 1976–1979 and 1982–1985, University of Oxford

== Other offices held ==
- Fellow, 1963–1992, emeritus fellow, from 1992, Balliol College, Oxford (Estates Bursar, 1980–1983 and 1991–1993)
- Senior visiting scientist, Lawrence Berkeley Laboratory, University of California, 1988–89
- Member, Nuclear Physics Board, Science Research Council, 1970–1973
