= US–UK Mutual Defence Agreement =

Nuclear weapons security pact

US–UK Mutual Defense Agreement
Agreement between the Government of the United States of America and the Government of the United Kingdom of Great Britain and Northern Ireland for Cooperation on the uses of Atomic Energy for Mutual Defense Purposes
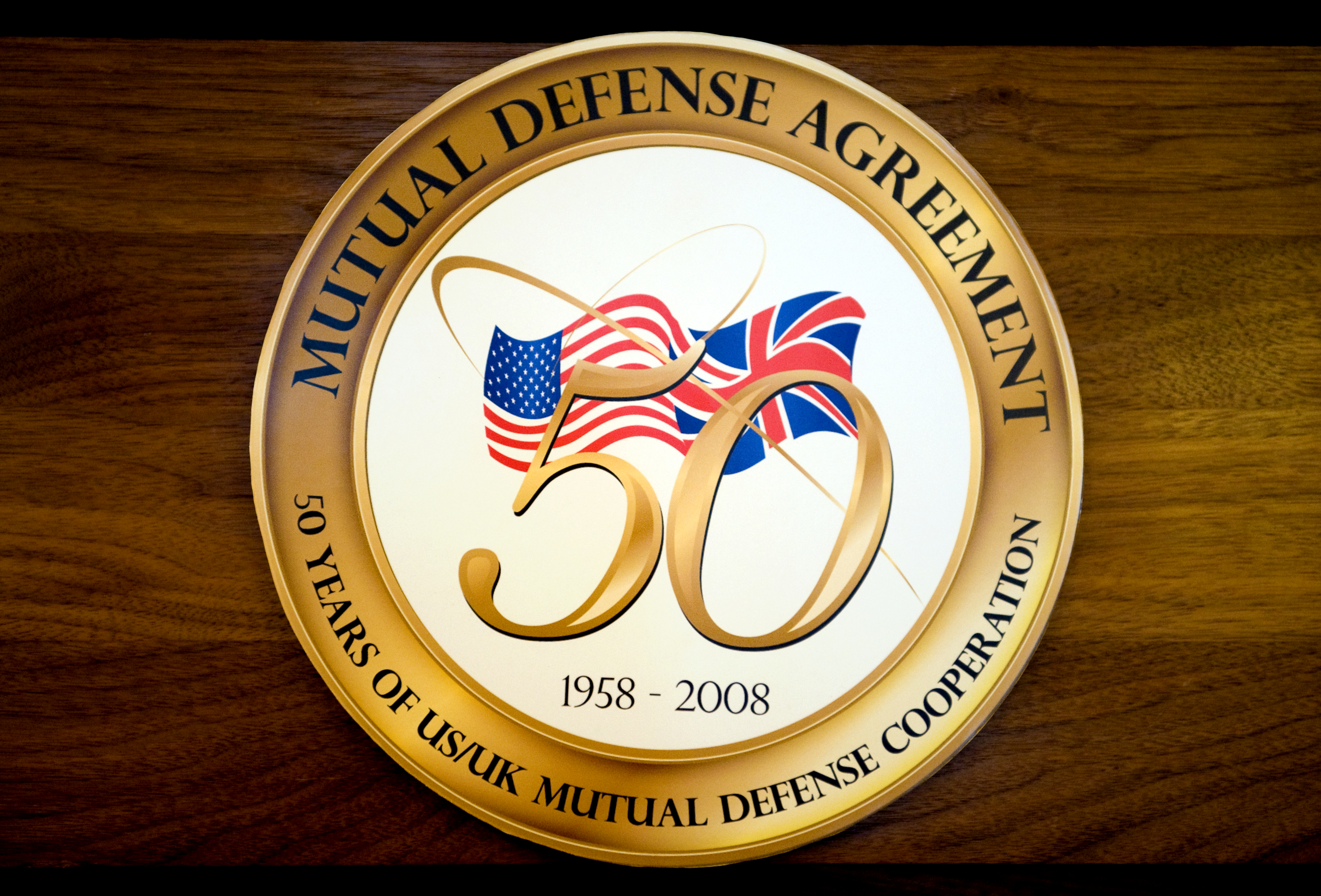
- Logo for celebrations commemorating the 50th anniversary of the treaty in 2008
- Signed: 3 July 1958
- Location: Washington, DC
- Effective: 4 August 1958
- Signatories: John Foster Dulles (US); Samuel Hood, 6th Viscount Hood (UK)

The US–UK Mutual Defense Agreement, or the 1958 UK–US Mutual Defence Agreement, is a bilateral treaty between the United States and the United Kingdom on nuclear weapons co-operation. The treaty's full name is Agreement between the Government of the United States of America and the Government of the United Kingdom of Great Britain and Northern Ireland for Cooperation on the uses of Atomic Energy for Mutual Defense Purposes. It allows the US and the UK to exchange nuclear materials, technology and information. The US has nuclear co-operation agreements with other countries, including France and other NATO countries, but this agreement is by far the most comprehensive. Because of the agreement's strategic value to the United Kingdom, Harold Macmillan (the prime minister who presided over the United Kingdom's entry into the agreement) called it "the Great Prize".

The treaty was signed on 3 July 1958 after the Soviet Union had shocked the American public with the launch of Sputnik on 4 October 1957, and the British hydrogen bomb programme had successfully tested a thermonuclear device in the Operation Grapple test on 8 November. The special relationship proved mutually beneficial, both militarily and economically. The United Kingdom soon became dependent on the United States for its nuclear weapons since it agreed to limit their nuclear program with the agreement of shared technology. The treaty allowed American nuclear weapons to be supplied to the United Kingdom through Project E for use by the Royal Air Force and British Army of the Rhine until the early 1990s when the UK became fully independent in designing and manufacturing its own warheads.

The treaty provided for the sale to the UK of one complete nuclear submarine propulsion plant, as well as ten years' supply of enriched uranium to fuel it. Other nuclear material was also acquired from the US under the treaty. Some 5.4 tonnes of UK-produced plutonium was sent to the US in return for 6.7 kilograms (15 lb) of tritium and 7.5 tonnes of highly enriched uranium (HEU) between 1960 and 1979, but much of the HEU was used not for weapons but as fuel for the growing fleet of British nuclear submarines. The treaty paved the way for the Polaris Sales Agreement, and the Royal Navy ultimately acquired entire weapons systems, with the UK Polaris programme and Trident nuclear programme using American missiles with British nuclear warheads.

The treaty has been amended and renewed ten times. On 14 November 2024, it was extended indefinitely.

== Background ==
=== Quebec Agreement ===
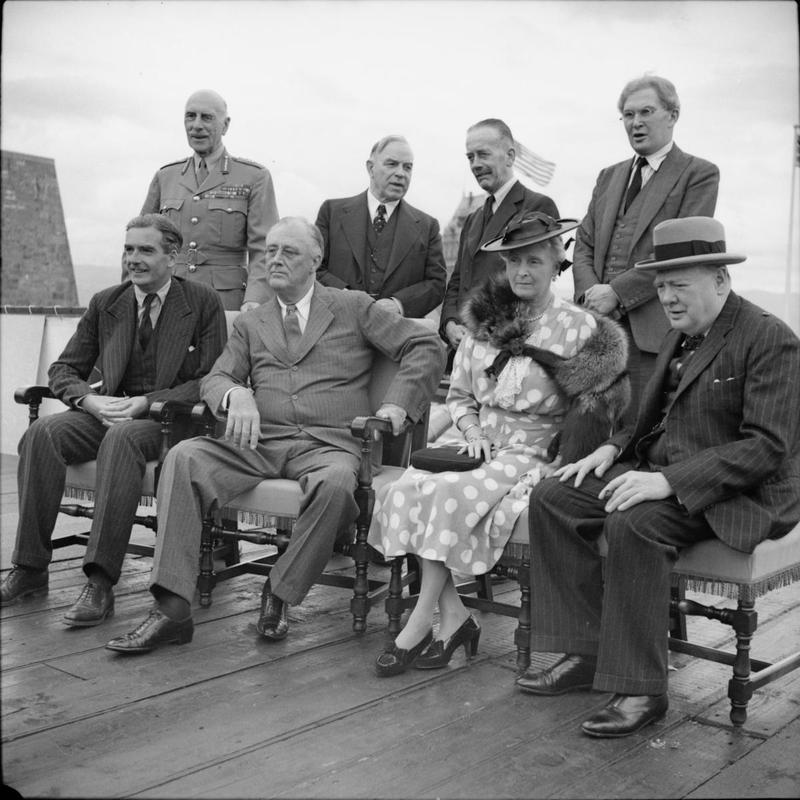
Quebec Conference in 1943. Seated are (left to right): Anthony Eden, President Franklin D. Roosevelt, the Countess of Athlone and Winston Churchill. Standing are (left to right): Earl of Athlone (Governor General of Canada), Mackenzie King (Prime Minister of Canada), Sir Alexander Cadogan, and Brendan Bracken.

During the early part of the Second World War, the United Kingdom had a nuclear weapons project, codenamed Tube Alloys. At the Quadrant Conference in August 1943, the prime minister of the United Kingdom, Winston Churchill, and the president of the United States, Franklin Roosevelt, signed the Quebec Agreement, which merged Tube Alloys with the American Manhattan Project to create a combined British, American and Canadian project. The Quebec Agreement established the Combined Policy Committee and the Combined Development Trust to co-ordinate their efforts. Many of United Kingdom top scientists participated in the Manhattan Project.

The September 1944 Hyde Park Aide-Mémoire extended both commercial and military co-operation into the post-war period, but Roosevelt died on 12 April 1945, and it was not binding on subsequent administrations. In fact, it was physically lost. When Field Marshal Sir Henry Maitland Wilson raised the matter in a Combined Policy Committee meeting in June 1945, the American copy could not be found. The Quebec Agreement specified that nuclear weapons would not be used against another country without mutual consent. On 4 July, Wilson gave the British agreement for the use of nuclear weapons against Japan. On 8 August, the prime minister, Clement Attlee, sent a message to President Harry Truman that referred to themselves as "heads of the Governments which have control of this great force".

=== Truman administration ===
The British government had trusted that the US would continue to share nuclear technology, which it considered to be a joint discovery. On 9 November 1945, Attlee and the prime minister of Canada, Mackenzie King, went to Washington, DC, to confer with Truman about future co-operation in nuclear weapons and nuclear power. A Memorandum of Intention was signed on 16 November 1945 that made Canada a full partner and replaced the Quebec Agreement's requirement for "mutual consent" before using nuclear weapons to one for "prior consultation". There was to be "full and effective co-operation in the field of atomic energy", but British hopes were soon disappointed since it was only "in the field of basic scientific research".

Technical co-operation was ended by the United States Atomic Energy Act of 1946 (McMahon Act), which forbade passing "restricted data" to American allies under pain of death. That partly resulted from the arrest for espionage of the British physicist Alan Nunn May in February 1946 while the legislation was being debated. Fearing a resurgence of American isolationism and the United Kingdom losing its great power status, the British government restarted its own development effort, now codenamed High Explosive Research.

By the end of 1947, 1,900 long tons (1,900 t) of uranium ore from the Belgian Congo was stockpiled for the Combined Development Trust at Springfields, near Preston in Lancashire, as part of a wartime sharing agreement, along with 1,350 long tons (1,370 t) for British use. To gain access to the stockpile for their own nuclear weapons project, the Americans opened negotiations that resulted in the Modus Vivendi, an agreement that was signed on 7 January 1948 and officially terminated all previous agreements, including the Quebec Agreement. It removed the British right of consultation on the use of nuclear weapons; allowed for limited sharing of technical information between the United States, United Kingdom and Canada and continued the Combined Policy Committee and the Combined Development Trust although the latter was renamed the Combined Development Agency.

In 1949, the Americans offered to make atomic bombs in the US available for United Kingdom to use if the British agreed to curtail their atomic bomb programme. That would have given United Kingdom nuclear weapons much sooner than its own target date of late 1952. Only the bomb components required by war plans would be stored in the UK, the rest would be kept in the US and Canada. The offer was rejected by the British on the grounds that it was not "compatible with our status as a first-class power to depend on others for weapons of this supreme importance".

As a counter-offer, the British proposed limiting the British programme in return for American bombs. The opposition of key American officials, including Lewis Strauss from the United States Atomic Energy Commission (AEC), and Senators Bourke B. Hickenlooper and Arthur Vandenberg of the Joint Committee on Atomic Energy (JCAE), coupled with security concerns aroused by the 2 February 1950 arrest of the British physicist Klaus Fuchs as an atomic spy, caused the proposal to be dropped. The June 1951 defection of Donald Maclean, who had served as a British member of the Combined Policy Committee from January 1947 to August 1948, reinforced the Americans' distrust of British security arrangements.

=== Eisenhower administration ===
The first British atomic bomb was successfully tested in Western Australia in Operation Hurricane on 3 October 1952, but although it was more advanced than the American bombs of 1946, United Kingdom was still several years behind in nuclear weapons technology. On 1 November, the United States conducted Ivy Mike, the first nuclear test of a true thermonuclear device (also known as a hydrogen bomb). The JCAE saw little benefit for the US from sharing technology with the United Kingdom. The Soviet Union responded to Ivy Mike with the test of Joe 4, a boosted fission weapon, on 12 August 1953. That prompted President Dwight Eisenhower, who was inaugurated in January 1953, to inform the US Congress that the McMahon Act, which he considered a "terrible piece of legislation" and "one of the most deplorable incidents in American history of which he personally felt ashamed", was obsolete.

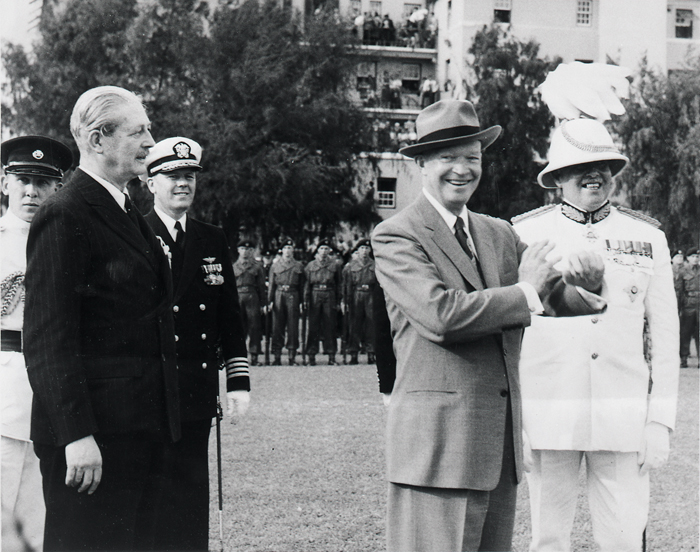
US president Dwight D. Eisenhower (second from right) and British prime minister Harold Macmillan (left foreground) meet for talks in Bermuda in March 1957 to repair the rift created by the 1956 Suez Crisis.

At the three-power Bermuda Conference in December 1953, Eisenhower and Churchill, who had become prime minister again on 25 October 1951, discussed the possibility of the United States giving the United Kingdom access to American nuclear weapons in wartime, which came to be called Project E. There were technical and legal issues that had to be overcome before American bombs could be carried in British aircraft. The Americans would have to disclose their weights and dimensions, and their delivery would require data concerning their ballistics. Further down the track would also be issues of custody, security and targeting. The release of such information was restricted by the McMahon Act.

It was amended on 30 August 1954 by the Atomic Energy Act of 1954, which allowed for greater exchange of information with foreign nations and paved the way for the Agreement for Co-operation Regarding Atomic Information for Mutual Defence Purposes, which was signed on 15 June 1955. On 13 June 1956, another agreement was concluded for the transfer of nuclear submarine propulsion technology to the United Kingdom, which saved the British government millions of pounds in research and development costs. It precipitated a row with the JCAE over whether that was permitted under the Atomic Energy Act of 1954 and whether United Kingdom met the security standards set by the 1955 agreement. With the 1956 presidential election approaching, Eisenhower was forced to rescind the offer.

The October 1956 Suez Crisis brought relations between the United Kingdom and the United States to a low ebb. Eisenhower met with the new British prime minister, Harold Macmillan, in Bermuda in March 1957 and raised the possibility of basing US intermediate range ballistic missile (IRBM) systems in the UK. This came to be called Project Emily. There were also discussions on exchanging nuclear submarine propulsion technology for information on the British Calder Hall nuclear power plant, allowing the United Kingdom Atomic Energy Authority (UKAEA) to purchase uranium ore from Canada and co-ordinating the war plans of RAF Bomber Command with those of the Strategic Air Command.

Although the IRBM negotiations pre-dated the Suez Crisis, the British government touted the IRBM deal as a demonstration that the rift had been healed. The British hydrogen bomb programme attempted to detonate a thermonuclear device in the Operation Grapple test series at Christmas Island in the Pacific. The test series was facilitated by the US, which also claimed the island. Although the first tests were unsuccessful, the Grapple X test on 8 November achieved the desired result.

== Negotiations ==
=== Sputnik crisis ===
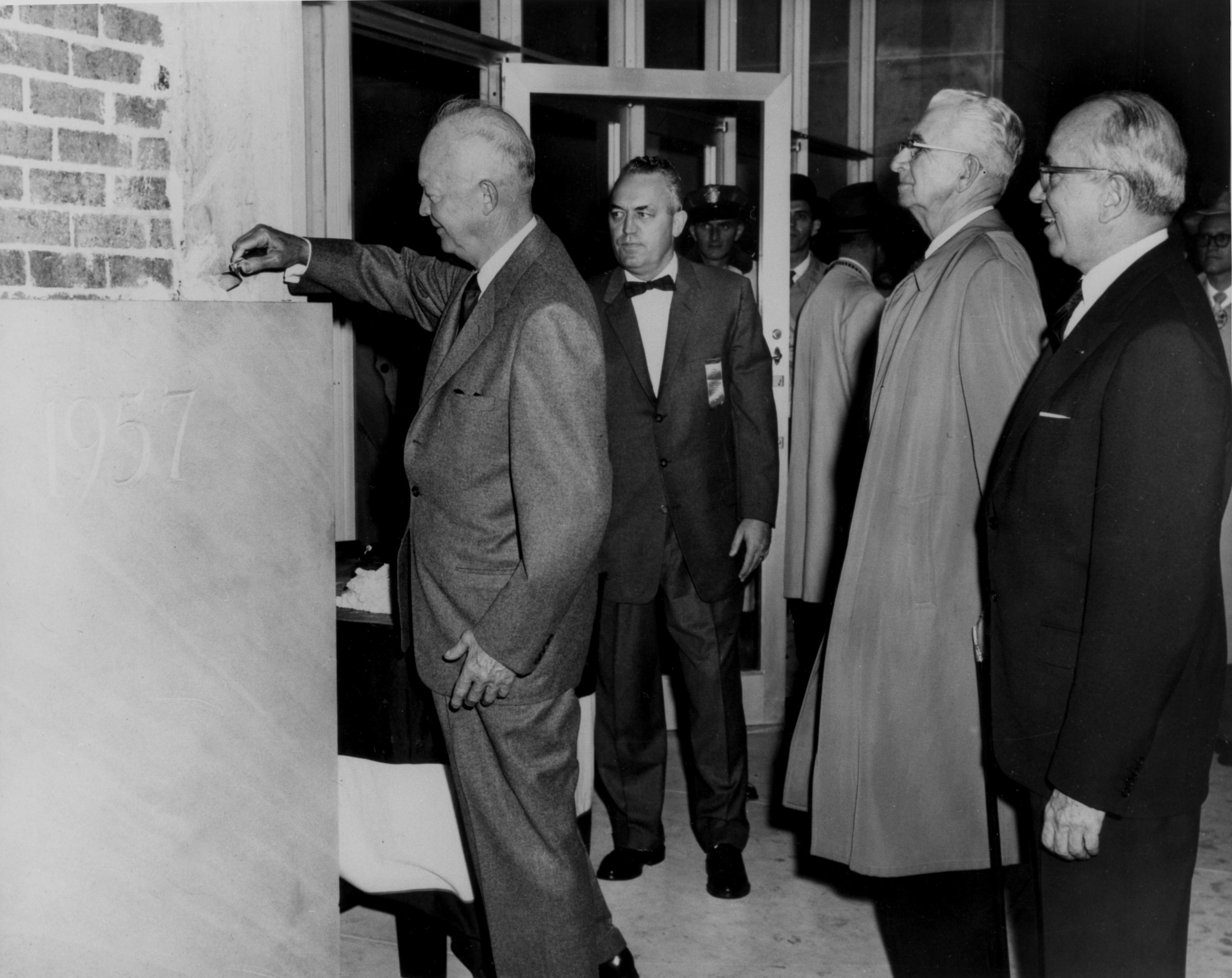
Eisenhower (left) lays the cornerstone for the new Atomic Energy Commission (AEC) building in Germantown, Maryland, on 8 November 1957. Joint Committee on Atomic Energy (JCAE) Chairman Carl T. Durham (centre) and AEC chairman Lewis Strauss (right) look on.

The successful development of British thermonuclear weapons came at an opportune moment to renew negotiations with the Americans. The Soviet Union's launch of Sputnik 1, the world's first artificial satellite, on 4 October 1957, came as a tremendous shock to the American public, which had trusted that American technological superiority ensured their invulnerability. Suddenly, there was now incontrovertible proof that in at least some areas, the Soviet Union was actually ahead. In the widespread calls for action in response to the Sputnik crisis, officials in the United States and United Kingdom seized an opportunity to mend their relationship. At the suggestion of Harold Caccia, the British Ambassador to the United States, Macmillan wrote to Eisenhower on 10 October to urge for both countries pool their resources, as Macmillan put it, to meet the Soviet challenge on every front, "military, economic and political".

Macmillan flew to Washington, DC, for talks on 25 October. He had concerns that the disastrous 10 October Windscale fire might prove a stumbling block in negotiations, as it might reflect badly on British expertise and provide ammunition for opponents of closer co-operation with the British. He ordered extra copies of the report into the fire to be destroyed and for the printers to destroy their type. He immediately sensed how shaken the Americans had been by Sputnik, which placed the Eisenhower administration under great public pressure to act on the deployment of IRBMs by a shocked and distraught nation.

Eisenhower and Macmillan agreed to form a study group headed by Sir Richard Powell, the Permanent Secretary to the Ministry of Defence, and Donald A. Quarles, the United States Deputy Secretary of Defense, to consider how the deployment of IRBMs to the United Kingdom might be expedited. Another study group, under Strauss and Sir Edwin Plowden, the head of the UKAEA, would investigate nuclear co-operation and the exchange of nuclear information. The personal relationship developed between Plowden and Strauss would be crucial in converting the latter over to the idea of providing information to the United Kingdom.

By December, most of the issues with the IRBM negotiations had been ironed out, and a formal agreement was drawn up on 17 December, but it was not until the end of the month that it was definitely determined that the United Kingdom would receive Thor, not Jupiter, missiles.

However, the nuclear submarine propulsion effort was running into trouble. Under the July 1956 agreement and a February 1957 directive from Eisenhower, Royal Navy officers had been assigned to study the US Navy's nuclear submarine programme. By October 1957, its head, Rear Admiral Hyman G. Rickover, felt that their questions were slowing the deployment of the Polaris submarine-launched IRBM at a critical time. He feared that any delay might cause Congress to favour land-based missiles. By December, the British liaison officers were complaining of slow response to their questions. Rickover proposed that Westinghouse be permitted to sell the Royal Navy a nuclear submarine reactor, which would allow it to immediately proceed with building its own nuclear-powered submarine. The British government endorsed this idea, as it would save it a great deal of money.

=== Amendment of McMahon Act ===
For their part, the British wanted the McMahon Act's restrictions on nuclear co-operation to be relaxed. They wanted to know the weight, dimensions, fusing and firing sequences, safety features, and in-flight procedures of the American weapons. That information would allow them to be carried in British V-bombers and American warheads to be fitted to British Blue Streak missiles. That could save millions of pounds and avoid domestic political complications if United Kingdom had to persist with nuclear testing during an international moratorium. While the British knew what they wanted, there was no consensus among the Americans as to what they wanted to provide. US Secretary of State John Foster Dulles was concerned that a special relationship with the United Kingdom might complicate US relationships with its other allies. Strauss, in particular, felt that a proposal to give hydrogen bomb secrets to the British would likely not get past the Congressional Joint Committee on Atomic Energy (JCAE), and counselled drafting amendments that were sufficiently vague as to give the president the authority that he needed without arousing its ire. Eisenhower declared that the US and the UK were "interdependent" and pledged to ask Congress to amend the McMahon Act.

Crucially, Eisenhower secured the support of Carl T. Durham, the chairman of the JCAE. Eisenhower met with congressional leaders on 3 December 1957 and pressed for more discretion to co-operate with all America's NATO allies, not just the United Kingdom. Indeed, the administration negotiated agreements with Australia, Canada and NATO. Eisenhower did not yet have wholehearted support for the proposal, but outright opposition from US Senator Clinton Anderson failed to attract much support. On 27 January 1958, Strauss sent Durham the administration's proposed legislative changes, and the JCAE Subcommittee on Agreements for Cooperation, chaired by Senator John Pastore, held hearings from 29 to 31 January. Quarles and Major General Herbert Loper, the Assistant to the Secretary of Defense for Atomic Energy Affairs, were forced to deal with pointed questions about nuclear proliferation. British information security, or the lack thereof no longer seemed so important now that the Soviet Union was apparently ahead and the UK had independently developed the hydrogen bomb, but the JCAE objected to the terms of the proposed deal to trade British uranium-235 for US plutonium under which the US would pay USD$30 per gram for plutonium that cost $12 per gram to produce in the UK.

The amendments were passed by the US House of Representatives on 19 June but not without changes that now limited exchanges of nuclear weapons data to nations that had made substantial progress in the field. The same restriction applied to the actual transfer of non-nuclear components of nuclear weapons. American nuclear weapons were to remain under US custody and could not be turned over to allies except in wartime. The sale of nuclear reactors for submarines and nuclear fuel for them and other military reactors was permitted. Only the UK qualified as a nation that had made substantial progress. The bill passed Congress on 30 June 1958 and was signed into law by Eisenhower on 2 July 1958.

The 1958 US–UK Mutual Defence Agreement was signed by Dulles and Samuel Hood, the British minister in Washington, DC, on 3 July and was approved by Congress on 30 July.

== Implementation ==
=== Details ===
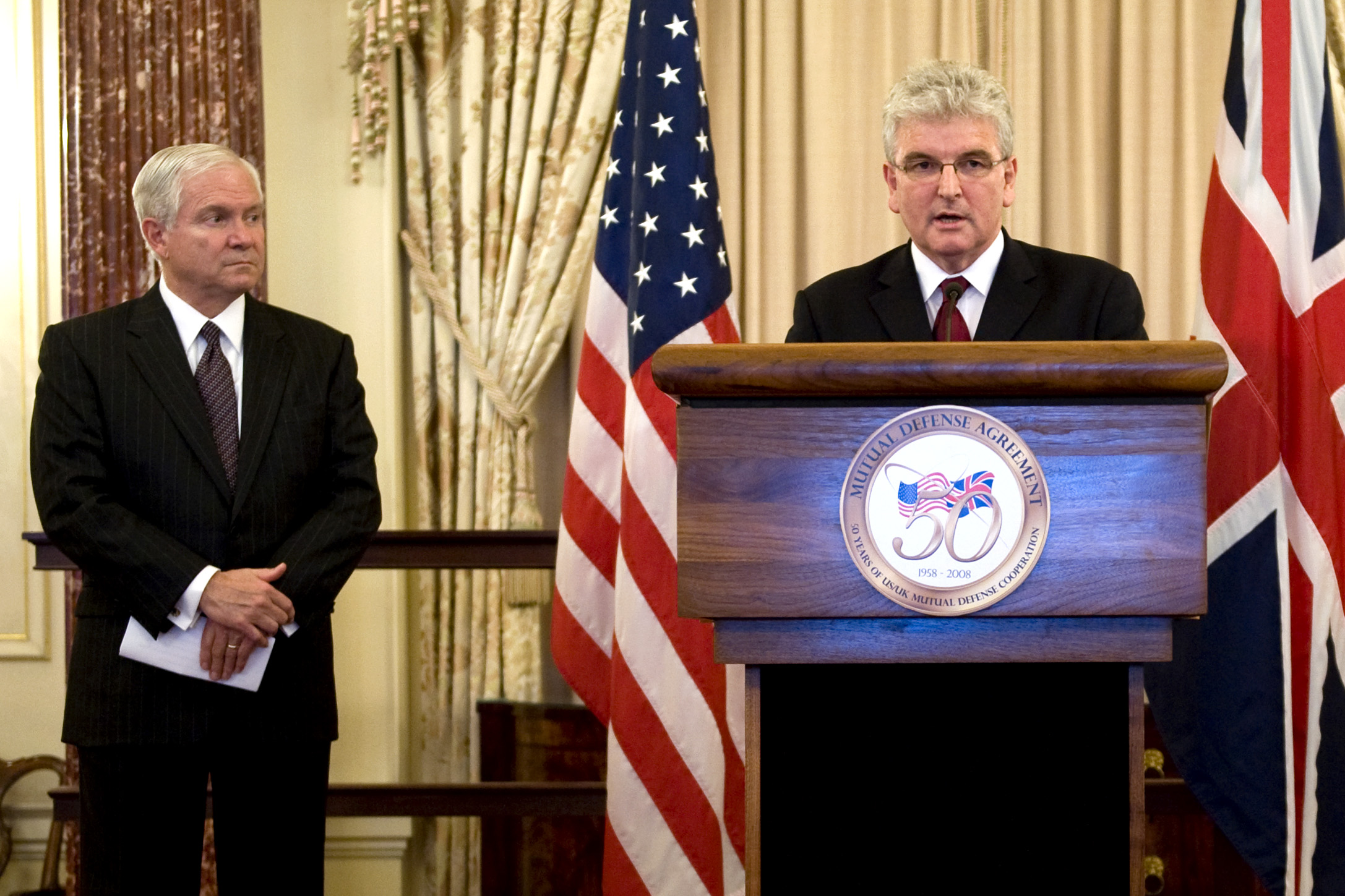
UK defence minister Des Browne (right) addresses a reception hosted by US defense secretary Robert M. Gates (left) commemorating the 50th anniversary of the US-UK Mutual Defence Agreement in Washington, DC, on 9 July 2008.

The agreement enables the US and the UK to exchange classified information with the objective of improving each party's "atomic weapon design, development, and fabrication capability". While the US has nuclear co-operation agreements with other countries, including France and some NATO countries, none of them is similar in scope to the US–UK Mutual Defence Agreement. Macmillan called it "the Great Prize".

Article 2 of the treaty covered joint development of defence plans; the mutual training of personnel in the use and defence against nuclear weapons; the sharing of intelligence and evaluation of enemy capabilities; the development of nuclear delivery systems and the research, development and design of military reactors. The treaty called for the exchange of "classified information concerning atomic weapons when, after consultation with the other Party, the communicating Party determines that the communication of such information is necessary to improve the recipient's atomic weapon design, development and fabrication capability". The US would communicate information about atomic weapons that were similar to UK atomic weapons. For the immediate future, that would exclude information about thermonuclear weapons. Confidential intelligence matters are also covered by the agreement. The UK government has not published those sections "because of the necessity for great confidentiality and because of the use that such information would be to other would-be nuclear states. In other words, it might well assist proliferation".

Article 3 provided for the sale to the UK of one complete nuclear submarine propulsion plant, as well as the uranium needed to fuel it for ten years. Because of concerns expressed by the JCAE, the AEC would determine the price that the United Kingdom would pay for highly enriched uranium (HEU). The treaty did not originally allow for non-nuclear components of nuclear weapons to be given to the United Kingdom. It was amended on 7 May 1959 to give the United Kingdom access to non-nuclear components and to permit the transfer of special nuclear material such as plutonium, HEU and tritium. The treaty paved the way for the subsequent Polaris Sales Agreement, which was signed on 6 April 1963. The two agreements have been "the cornerstone of the UK-US nuclear relationship for nearly 60 years".

=== Nuclear weapons development ===
The AEC invited the British government to send representatives to a series of meetings in Washington, DC, on 27 and 28 August 1958 to work out the details. The US delegation included Willard Libby, AEC deputy chairman; Loper; Brigadier General Alfred Starbird, AEC Director of Military Applications; Norris Bradbury, director of the Los Alamos National Laboratory; Edward Teller, director of the Lawrence Livermore Laboratory; and James W. McRae, president of the Sandia Corporation. The British representatives were Sir Frederick Brundrett, the Chief Scientific Adviser to the Ministry of Defence, and Victor Macklen from the Ministry of Defence; and William Penney, William Cook and E. F. Newly from the Atomic Weapons Research Establishment at Aldermaston. The Americans disclosed the details of nine of their nuclear weapon designs: the Mark 7, Mark 15/39, Mark 19, Mark 25, Mark 27, Mark 28, Mark 31, Mark 33 and Mark 34. In return, the British provided the details of seven of theirs, including Green Grass; Pennant, the boosted device which had been detonated in the Grapple Z test on 22 August; Flagpole, the two-stage device scheduled for 2 September; Burgee, scheduled for 23 September; and the three-stage Halliard 3. The Americans were impressed with the British designs, particularly with Halliard 1, the heavier version of Halliard 3. Cook, therefore, changed the Grapple Z programme to fire Halliard 1 instead of Halliard 3. Macmillan noted in his diary with satisfaction:

in some respects we are as far, and even further, advanced in the art than our American friends. They thought interchange of information would be all give. They are keen that we should complete our series, especially the last megaton, the character of which is novel and of deep interest to them.

An AEC report to JCAE confirmed Macmillan's belief, stating that

the United Kingdom has achieved an advanced state of weapons research and development in both the fission and thermonuclear fields. Moreover, it appeared that certain advances made by the United Kingdom would be of benefit to the United States.

Another meeting at Sandia Labs on 17 to 19 September also went well. Weapon designers who had worked in secret ended 12 years of isolation. Each side had problems which the other had solved. John Corner estimated that British scientists gained two years of knowledge.

An early benefit of the agreement was to allow the UK to "Anglicise" the W28 nuclear warhead as the Red Snow warhead for the Blue Steel missile. The British designers were impressed by the W28, which was not only lighter than the British Green Grass warhead used in Yellow Sun but also remarkably more economical in its use of expensive fissile material. The Yellow Sun Mark 2 using Red Snow cost £500,000 compared with £1,200,000 for the Mark 1 with Green Grass. A 1974 CIA proliferation assessment noted: "In many cases [Britain's sensitive technology in nuclear and missile fields] is based on technology received from the US and could not legitimately be passed on without US permission". The UK National Audit Office noted that most of the UK Trident programme warhead development and production expenditure had been incurred in the US, which supplied special materials and "certain warhead-related components and services". There is evidence that the warhead design of the British Trident system is similar to or even based upon the US W76 warhead fitted in US Navy Trident missiles, with design and blast model data supplied to the UK.

The United Kingdom soon became dependent on the United States for its nuclear weapons, as it lacked the resources to produce a range of designs. The treaty allowed the UK to receive US nuclear weapons for the Royal Air Force (RAF) and British Army of the Rhine (BAOR) under Project E. In return the USA could send Thor missiles supplied under Project Emily to the UK, from where they could reach the Soviet Union.

The UK was able to carry out underground nuclear tests at the US Nevada Test Site, where the first British test took place on 1 March 1962. British nuclear testing in the United States continued until it was abruptly halted by President George H. W. Bush in October 1992. Major subcritical nuclear tests continued to occur, most notably the Etna test in February 2002 and the Krakatau test in February 2006.

=== Special nuclear materials barter ===
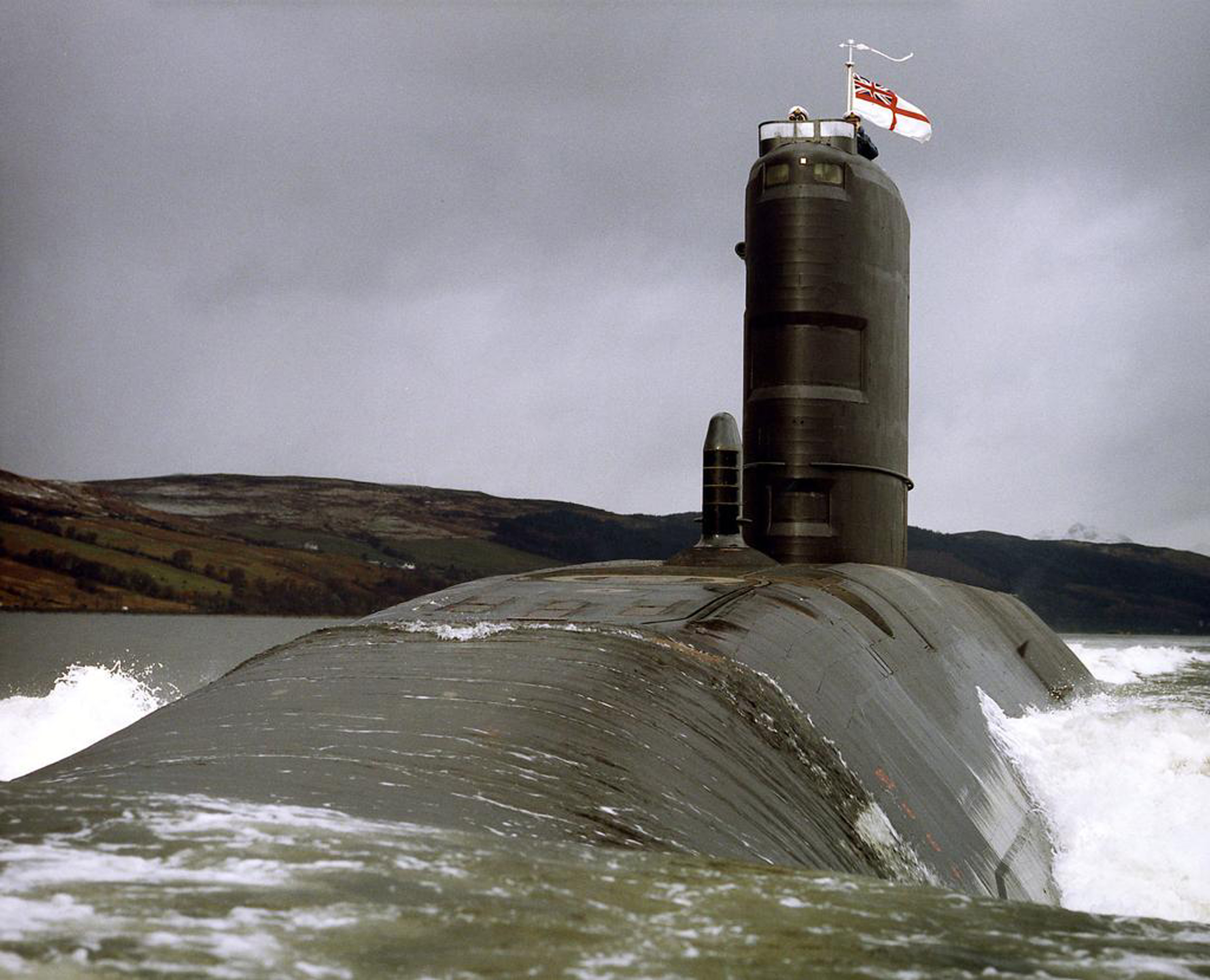
The Royal Navy's Swiftsure-class submarine HMS Splendid

Under the agreement 5.37 tonnes of UK-produced plutonium was sent to the US in exchange for 6.7 kg of tritium and 7.5 tonnes of HEU between 1960 and 1979. A further 470 kg of plutonium was swapped between the US and the UK for reasons that remain classified. Some of the UK-produced plutonium was used in 1962 by the US for the only known nuclear weapon test of reactor-grade plutonium. The plutonium sent to the US included some produced in UK civil Magnox reactors, and the US gave assurances that the civil plutonium was not used in the US nuclear weapons programme. It was used in civil programmes which included californium production and reactor research.

Some of the fissile materials for the UK Trident warhead were purchased from the US, but much of the HEU supplied by the US was used not for weapons but as fuel for the growing fleet of UK nuclear submarines. Under the treaty, the US supplied the UK with not only nuclear submarine propulsion technology but also a complete S5W pressurised water reactor of the kind used to power the US Skipjack-class submarines. That was used in the Royal Navy's first nuclear-powered submarine, HMS Dreadnought, which was launched in 1960 and commissioned in 1963. The S5W was fuelled by uranium enriched to between 93 and 97 per cent uranium-235. In return for a "considerable amount" of information regarding submarine design and quietening techniques being passed on to the United States, reactor technology was transferred from Westinghouse to Rolls-Royce, which used it as the basis for its PWR1 reactor used in the UK's Valiant, Resolution, Churchill, Swiftsure and Trafalgar submarines.

The UK produced HEU at its facility in Capenhurst, but production for military purposes ceased there in March 1963. Thereafter, uranium oxide was imported from Australia, Canada, Namibia, South Africa, the United States and Zaire and processed into uranium hexafluoride at Springfields. It was then shipped to the US, where it was enriched at the Portsmouth Gaseous Diffusion Plant near Piketon, Ohio. HEU was then flown back to the UK in RAF aircraft. In 1994, with the Portsmouth plant about to close, the treaty was amended with the US requirement to "provide" uranium enrichment services changed to one to "arrange" them. By March 2002, the UK had a stockpile of 21.86 tonnes of HEU, about 80 years' supply for the Royal Navy's nuclear-powered submarines.

=== Joint Working Groups ===
Most of the activity under the treaty is information exchange through Joint Working Groups (JOWOG). At least 15 of them were established in 1959. Subjects investigated included

one-point safety, computer codes, metallurgy and fabrication technology for beryllium, uranium and plutonium, corrosion of uranium in the presence of water and water vapour, underground effects tests, outer-space testing, clandestine testing, the technology of lithium compounds, high explosives, deuterium monitors, extinguishing plutonium fires, high-speed cameras, mechanical safing, liquid and solid explosive shock initiation, environmental sensing switches, neutron sources, tritium reservoirs, telemetry, hydrodynamic and shock relations for problems with spherical and cylindrical symmetry, nuclear cross sections, radiochemistry, atomic demolition munitions, warhead hardening, asymmetric detonations, terrorist nuclear threat response, nuclear weapons accidents and waste management.

Between 2007 and 2009, staff of the Atomic Weapons Establishment paid 2,000 visits to US nuclear facilities. As of 2014 there are also two enhanced collaborations jointly developing capabilities:

- Enhanced Nuclear Safety to develop architectures and technologies related to warhead safety; and
- Warhead Electrical System to develop architectures and technologies for warhead electrical systems.

=== Mutual benefit ===
The Anglo-American special relationship proved mutually beneficial although it has never been one of equals after the World Wars since the US has been far larger than the United Kingdom both militarily and economically. Lorna Arnold noted:

The balance of advantage in the exchanges was necessarily in the United Kingdom favour but they were not entirely one-sided. In some areas, notably electronics and high explosives, the British were equal or perhaps even superior, and in many areas they had valuable ideas to contribute, as the American scientists, and notably Teller, appreciated.

A 1985 report by the US State Department's Bureau of Intelligence and Research reported that the US was "profoundly involved and benefited greatly" from the treaty.

== Renewal ==
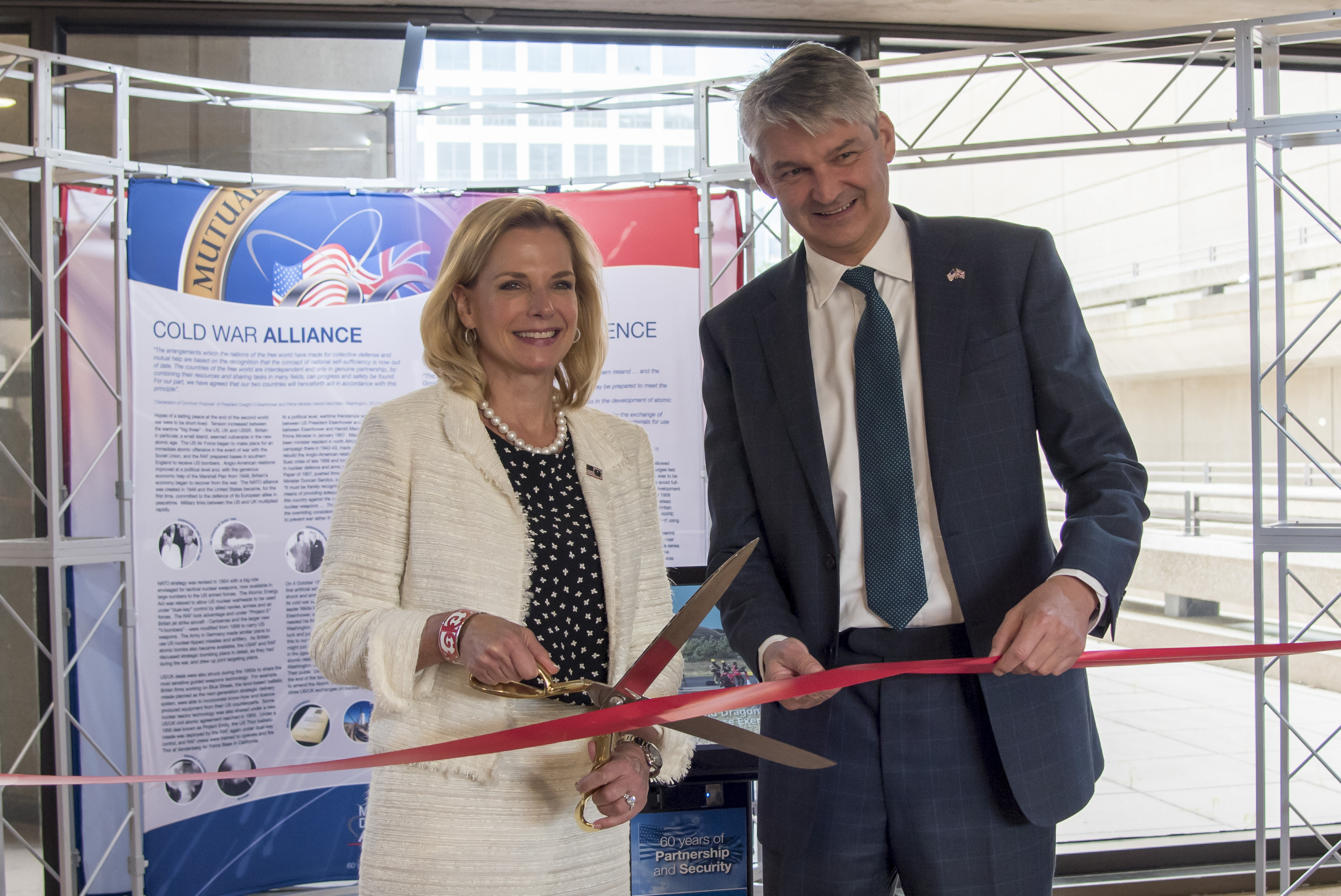
NNSA Administrator Lisa Gordon-Hagerty and Stephen Lovegrove cut the ribbon on the US-UK Mutual Defence Agreement 60th Anniversary commemorative exhibit in June 2018

The treaty was amended on 7 May 1959, 27 September 1968, 16 October 1969, 22 June 1974, 5 December 1979, 5 June 1984, 23 May 1994 and 14 June 2004. Most amendments merely extended the treaty for another five or ten years; others added definitions and made minor changes. On 22 July 2014, the treaty was extended to 31 December 2024, with minor changes for the Trident nuclear programme. On 25 July 2024, with the treaty about to expire, the UK government proposed amendments that included removal of the expiry date for the transfer of special nuclear materials and equipment, thereby allowing the agreement to remain in force on an "enduring basis". On 14 November 2024, the agreement was extended indefinitely.

A 2004 legal opinion obtained by the British American Security Information Council (BASIC) argued that renewal of the treaty violated Article VI of the Nuclear Non-Proliferation Treaty, which required signatories to take steps towards nuclear disarmament, but that was not accepted by the British government. In July 2014, Baroness Warsi, the Senior Minister of State for Foreign and Commonwealth Affairs from 2012 to 2014, stated the government's position:

We are committed to the goal of a world without nuclear weapons and firmly believe that the best way to achieve this is through gradual disarmament negotiated through a step-by-step approach within the framework of the Nuclear Non-Proliferation Treaty. The UK has a strong record on nuclear disarmament and continues to be at the forefront of international efforts to control proliferation, and to make progress towards multilateral nuclear disarmament. The UK-USA Mutual Defence Agreement is, and will continue to be, in full compliance with our obligations under the Nuclear Non-Proliferation Treaty.

== See also ==
- Allied technological cooperation during World War II
- AUKUS – Trilateral security partnership between Australia, the United Kingdom and the United States announced in 2021
- List of military alliances
- Military alliance
- Tizard Mission
- UKUSA Agreement – Multilateral treaty covering signals intelligence, secretly signed in 1946
