= Henry Rainsford Hulme =

British scientist (1908–1991)

- Born: 9 August 1908; Southport, Lancashire, England
- Died: 8 January 1991 (aged 82); Basingstoke, England
- Education: Gonville and Caius College, Cambridge
- Occupations: Scientist, Civil Servant
- Notable work: United Kingdom Atomic Energy Authority
- Spouse(s): Hilda Marion Reavley (1937–1955, divorced); Margery Alice Ducker (1955–1990, her death)
- Children: Anne Perry (Juliet Marion Hulme) (1938–2023); Jonathan Rainsford Hulme (1944–)

Henry Rainsford Hulme (9 August 1908 – 8 January 1991) was a British scientist who is considered one of the four major minds behind the successful British hydrogen bomb project. He was the father of author and convicted murderer Anne Perry.

== Early life ==
Hulme was born to James Rainsford Hulme and Alice Jane Smith. He attended Southport Modern School before winning a scholarship to Manchester Grammar School in 1920. He excelled while at the Manchester Grammar School and came top of his class every year bar one. After leaving the Manchester Grammar School he went to study Mathematics and Physics at Gonville and Caius College, Cambridge, which he entered on 1 October 1926. He obtained a BA (Maths Tripos) in 1929 and a PhD in 1932, and while he was there he won many prizes and achievements relating to his studies. He also studied at the University of Leipzig.

== Early working life ==
His first job appears to have been as a teacher in Mathematics at the University of Liverpool, between 1936 and 1938. While working there he met his first wife Hilda Marion Reavley and they married in first half of 1937. Not long after the marriage, Hulme accepted a position at the Royal Observatory in Greenwich as the Chief Assistant. Even though he listed in his biography in Who's Who that he held this position from 1938 to 1945 he was really there full-time for two years. During this period he wrote numerous papers that were published in the journals of the time.

== War work ==
While working at the Royal Observatory, Greenwich, World War II broke out and it wasn't long before he was loaned out for war work in 1940 as Chief Scientist in the Degaussing Department (mine design department), in charge of 50 men. In 1942 he became deputy director of Operational Research at the Admiralty, where he was a member of Blackett's Circle, which looked at the problem of how to stop mines sticking to the hulls of ships when they were magnetised. By the end of the war he had risen to the position of Director Operational Research at the Admiralty. It was at the end the war that he resigned his position at the Royal Observatory in Greenwich and began working as a Scientific Advisor to the British Air Ministry. During this period he also visited the United States to see the Manhattan Project and the construction of the US nuclear bomb. Even though he had been loaned out on war work he tried to keep contact with the Royal Observatory and in 1942, Hulme became the secretary of the Royal Astronomical Society.

== New Zealand 1948–1954 ==
In 1947 an advertisement was placed in numerous newspapers in the British Commonwealth. It was dated 30 May 1947 and invited applications for the position of Rector at Canterbury University College in New Zealand. Hulme's name was put forward for this position. On 25 November 1947, Hulme was offered the position and on 22 December he sent a telegraph stating: "Confirm acceptance – expect to sail late June – Hulme." Before Hulme left for New Zealand he was given a Doctor of Science (ScD) by Gonville and Caius College.

Hulme and his family left England on 30 August 1948 heading to New Zealand so that he could take up the position of the first Rector of Canterbury University College. They arrived in New Zealand on 13 October and were welcomed by staff at CUC on 16 October 1948 at a party thrown for him. Soon after his arrival, Hulme alienated many of his colleagues at CUC by voting against his own College Council regarding the site of a proposed School of Forestry. His relationship with the college deteriorated steadily as other issues arose until finally, in mid-March 1954, he was asked by his colleagues to resign. A vote of no confidence in the rector was held on 3 March 1954, and Hulme formally handed in his resignation on 4 March, with it being accepted on 15 March. Hulme's resignation stated that he would stay in the position until 1 January 1955.

In 1953, Hulme was awarded the Queen Elizabeth II Coronation Medal.

On 22 June 1954, Hulme's 15-year-old daughter Juliet and her school friend Pauline Parker murdered Pauline's mother, Honorah Mary Parker, in the hills of Victoria Park, Cashmere. In the face of his daughter's arrest and the ensuing scandal, Hulme requested and was granted an early leave from the college, after which he returned to England.

== 1954–1973 ==
Hulme left New Zealand on 3 July 1954 with his son Jonathan, before the trial of his daughter had begun. He was photographed on the deck of the SS Himalaya, docked in Adelaide. "The world must just consider me an unnatural father," Hulme was reported as saying, and gave a statement to the press denouncing his daughter and that his priority at that time was his son Jonathan. This was the only statement that he ever made regarding what happened. When Hulme and his son made landfall in Marseilles they disembarked and disappeared from public view. His divorce to his first wife was final by 10 March 1955 and soon after he married Margery Alice Ducker.

After returning to England, Hulme accepted a position at the Atomic Weapons Research Establishment, where he worked until his retirement in August 1973. He started as a scientist, but by 1959 had become Director of Nuclear Research, a position that he held until his retirement. During his time at AWRE he was the UK representative at the Nuclear Weapon Test Verification talks in Geneva. At the end of January 1956 Henry Hulme wrote a paper spelling out his ideas on Green Granite, a three-stage nuclear bomb. He wrote: "We are confident...that the bomb is a three-stage one in which the first bomb is imploded by ordinary explosive and the second by energy from the first bomb. The thermonuclear material which constitutes the third stage is ignited by energy and neutrons from the second bomb. We shall refer to the three components as Tom, Dick and Harry..." He was present at many of the British H-bomb tests after 1955 and has been considered one of the most creative minds who ever worked at AWRE.

As none of the people who worked at Aldermaston wrote personal accounts of their work, limited information is available about the history of these developments; for example the dates that Aldermaston discovered the three essential ideas of the H-bomb are still unknown. When Lorna Arnold wrote her book Britain and the H-Bomb she was unable to talk to Hulme or the other three members of the team at the heart of the project.

== Publications ==
=== Journal articles ===
- 1931 - "The Photoelectric Effect of γ-Rays"; Proceedings of the Royal Society of London. Series A, Containing Papers of a Mathematical and Physical Character; Vol 133; Issue 822; Pages 381-406
- 1932 - "The Faraday Effect in Ferromagnetics"; Proceedings of the Royal Society of London. Series A, Containing Papers of a Mathematical and Physical Character; Vol 135; Issue 826; Pages 237-257
- 1932 - "The Internal Conversion Coefficient for Radium C"; Proceedings of the Royal Society of London. Series A, Containing Papers of a Mathematical and Physical Character; Vol 138; Issue 836; Pages 643-664
- 1933 - "Photoelectric Absorption of γ-Rays by Heavy Elements"; Nature; Vol 132; Issue 3331; Pages 352-353
- 1934 - "The Annihilation of Fast Positions by Electrons in the K-Shell"; Proceedings of the Royal Society of London. Series A, Containing Papers of a Mathematical and Physical Character; Vol 146; Issue 859; Pages 723-736
- 1935 - "The Internal Conversion of γ-Rays with the Production of Electrons and Positrons"; Proceedings of the Royal Society of London. Series A, Containing Papers of a Mathematical and Physical Character; Vol 148; Issue 865; Pages 708-728
- 1935 - "The Photoelectric Absorption of γ-Rays in Heavy Elements"; Proceedings of the Royal Society of London. Series A, Containing Papers of a Mathematical and Physical Character; Vol 149; Issue 866; Pages 131-151
- 1935 - "On the Electromagnetic Field due to Variable Electric Charges and the Intensities of Spectrum Lines according to the Quantum Theory"; Proceedings of the Royal Society of London. Series A, Containing Papers of a Mathematical and Physical Character; Vol 150; Issue 870; Pages 416-421
- 1936 - "On the Annihilation of Positrons"; Mathematical Proceedings of the Cambridge Philosophical Society; Vol 32; Issue 1; Pages 158-160
- 1936 - "On the Production of Electron Pairs"; Proceedings of the Royal Society of London. Series A, Containing Papers of a Mathematical and Physical Sciences; Vol 153; Issue 879; Pages 443-447
- 1936 - "On the Interaction of Two Particles"; Proceedings of the Royal Society of London. Series A, Containing Papers of a Mathematical and Physical Sciences; Vol 154; Issue 882; Pages 487-500
- 1936 - "The Internal Conversion Coefficient for γ-Rays"; Proceedings of the Royal Society of London. Series A, Containing Papers of a Mathematical and Physical Sciences; Vol 155; Issue 885; Pages 315-330
- 1938 - "Angular Distribution of Electron Pairs"; Nature; Vol 142; Issue 3595; Pages 573
- 1939 - "A comparison of the declinations of the Boss General Catalogue with those derived from the observations with the Cookson floating telescope to determine the variation of the latitude at Greenwich during the years 1911-1936"; Monthly Notices of the Royal Astronomical Society; Vol 99; January 1939; Pages 199-201
- 1939 - "Preliminary values of the variation of latitude at Greenwich during 1936-1938, together with an account of the new observing programme"; Monthly Notices of the Royal Astronomical Society; Vol 99; January 1939; Pages 202-5
- 1939 - "On the motion of solar prominences and streamers"; Monthly Notices of the Royal Astronomical Society; Vol 99; June 1939; Pages 634-41
- 1939 - "The law of error and the combination of observations"; Monthly Notices of the Royal Astronomical Society; Vol 99; June 1939; Pages 642-29
- 1939 - "Note on the integration of the equation of the formation of absorption lines"; Monthly Notices of the Royal Astronomical Society; Vol 99; June 1939; Pages 730-2
- 1940 - "The statistical theory of errors (Council Report on the progress of astronomy)"; Monthly Notices of the Royal Astronomical Society; Vol 100; February 1940; Pages 303-14
- 1940 - "On the reality of periods determined by Fourier analysis, with an application to the problem of the solar constant"; The Observatory; Vol 63; April 1940; Pages 101-5
- 1947 - "Population Studies in Fisheries Biology"; Nature; Vol 159; Issue 4047; Pages 714-715

=== Books ===
- 1969 – Nuclear Fusion; Wykeham Publications (London) (ISBN 9780851090504)

== Representations ==
=== Dramatic ===
- Clive Merrison portrayed Hulme in the 1994 movie Heavenly Creatures by Peter Jackson.
- Hulme is a character in the play Daughters of Heaven by Michelanne Forster.

== See also ==
- William Penney
- United Kingdom Atomic Energy Authority
- Atomic Weapons Research Establishment
