= William Richard Joseph Cook =

British civil servant and mathematician

William Cook
- Born: 10 April 1905; Trowbridge, Wiltshire, England
- Died: 16 September 1987 (aged 82); London
- Education: Bristol University
- Known for: Hydrogen bomb Rolls-Royce RB211
- Awards: Companion of the Order of the Bath (1952); Knight Bachelor (1958); Fellow of the Royal Society (1962); Knight Commander of the Order of the Bath (1970)
- Scientific career
- Workplaces: Aldermaston

Sir William Richard Joseph Cook, KCB FRS (10 April 1905 – 16 September 1987) was a British civil servant and mathematician.

A graduate of Bristol University, he joined the staff of the Woolwich Arsenal in 1928, working on the 6-inch naval guns and the 3-inch anti-aircraft rocket. During the Second World War he was deputy controller of the Projectile Development Establishment. After the war, he became director of the Ministry of Supply's Rocket Propulsion Establishment at Westcott, Buckinghamshire. In 1947 he joined the Royal Naval Scientific Service, serving as its chief from 1950 to 1954, when he became deputy head of the Weapons Group of the newly created United Kingdom Atomic Energy Authority (UKAEA). It was under his leadership that Britain developed the hydrogen bomb, and he was present as the scientific director of the Operation Grapple nuclear tests at Malden Island in May and June 1957, and the successful thermonuclear test at Christmas Island in November 1957. In 1958, he became the UKAEA's Member for Engineering and Production, and oversaw the expansion of the civil nuclear power industry.

Cook returned to the Ministry of Defence in 1960 as one of two deputies to the Chief Scientific Adviser to the Ministry of Defence. Cook served as the Chief Scientific Adviser to the Ministry of Defence from 1966 until 1970, when he retired from the civil service. He oversaw the development of weapons such as the Panavia Tornado, Rapier surface-to-air missile, SEPECAT Jaguar and FH70 howitzer. After Rolls-Royce went bankrupt in 1970, he chaired a committee that determined that the Rolls-Royce RB211 engine should be continued. When Rolls-Royce was nationalised in 1971, he was appointed as a director of the company; he retired in 1976, but continued to assist the company for four more years. He was also a director of GEC Marconi Electronics from 1972 to 1979, and Marconi International Marine from 1971 to 1975, and a consultant to British Telecom from 1982 to 1985.

== Early life ==
William Richard Joseph (Bill) Cook was born in Trowbridge, Wiltshire, on 10 April 1905, the oldest child of John Cook, a railway inspector, and his wife, Eva née Boobyer. He had two younger siblings. He was educated at Trowbridge Trinity School and Trowbridge Boy's High School (which would merge with the girls' grammar school in 1969, becoming comprehensive in 1974 as The John of Gaunt School). He gained his Higher School Certificate with a distinction in mathematics, for which he was awarded a university scholarship. He entered Bristol University, from which he received his Bachelor of Science degree in 1925. This was followed by a Diploma of Education in 1926, and a Master of Science degree in 1927, writing his dissertation on "The forces between atoms and ions".

== Rockets ==
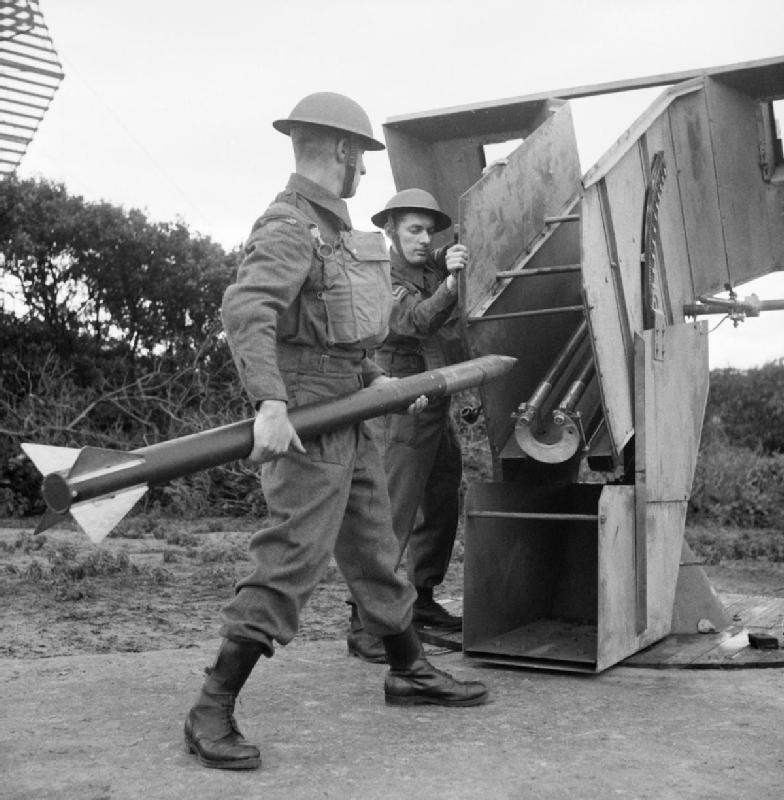
Home Guard soldiers load a 3-inch anti-aircraft rocket

Cook worked as a part-time lecturer, and an assistant to John Lennard-Jones. He considered becoming a teacher, but in 1928 he elected to become a civil servant instead, joining the staff of the Royal Arsenal in Woolwich as a librarian. He initially worked in the external ballistics section of the Research Department there, where he developed the Cook Camera. This was used to investigate the problem of the inaccuracy of the Royal Navy's triple-mounted 6 inch naval guns. The problem was traced to the blast waves interfering with each other, and was resolved by delaying the firing of the middle gun by a few milliseconds. In 1929, he married Grace Purnell. They had a daughter, Betty.

In 1935 Cook was sent to work on the 3-inch anti-aircraft rocket, the brainchild of Lord Cherwell and Duncan Sandys. The rocket had a problem, the bonding of the cordite to the outer case failing. Cook led the project which corrected this, enabling the rockets to be deployed in 1940, with the first battery under Sandys' command, in time to support the air defence of Britain during the Second World War. He divorced Grace in 1939, and married Gladys Allen, a librarian at Woolwich. They had a son and a daughter. The Rocket Development Department moved from Woolwich to Fort Halstead, and then to Aberporth in 1940, where it became the Projectile Development Establishment, with Sir Alwyn Crow as Controller of Projectile Development and Cook as his deputy.

In 1943, Cook was asked to provide an expert opinion on military intelligence that the Germans were developing long-range rockets. Cherwell, Crow and Cook were agreed that a long-range liquid-propellant rocket was technologically infeasible, and a solid-propellant rocket using cordite would be impractically large. Wernher von Braun proved them wrong, with the successful deployment of the V-2 rocket. Cook then turned to the study of missile guidance mechanisms for the British Liquid Oxygen-Petrol / Guided Aerial Projectile (LOP/GAP) liquid-propellant rocket. After the war he became director of the Ministry of Supply's Rocket Propulsion Establishment at Westcott, Buckinghamshire.

== Nuclear weapons ==
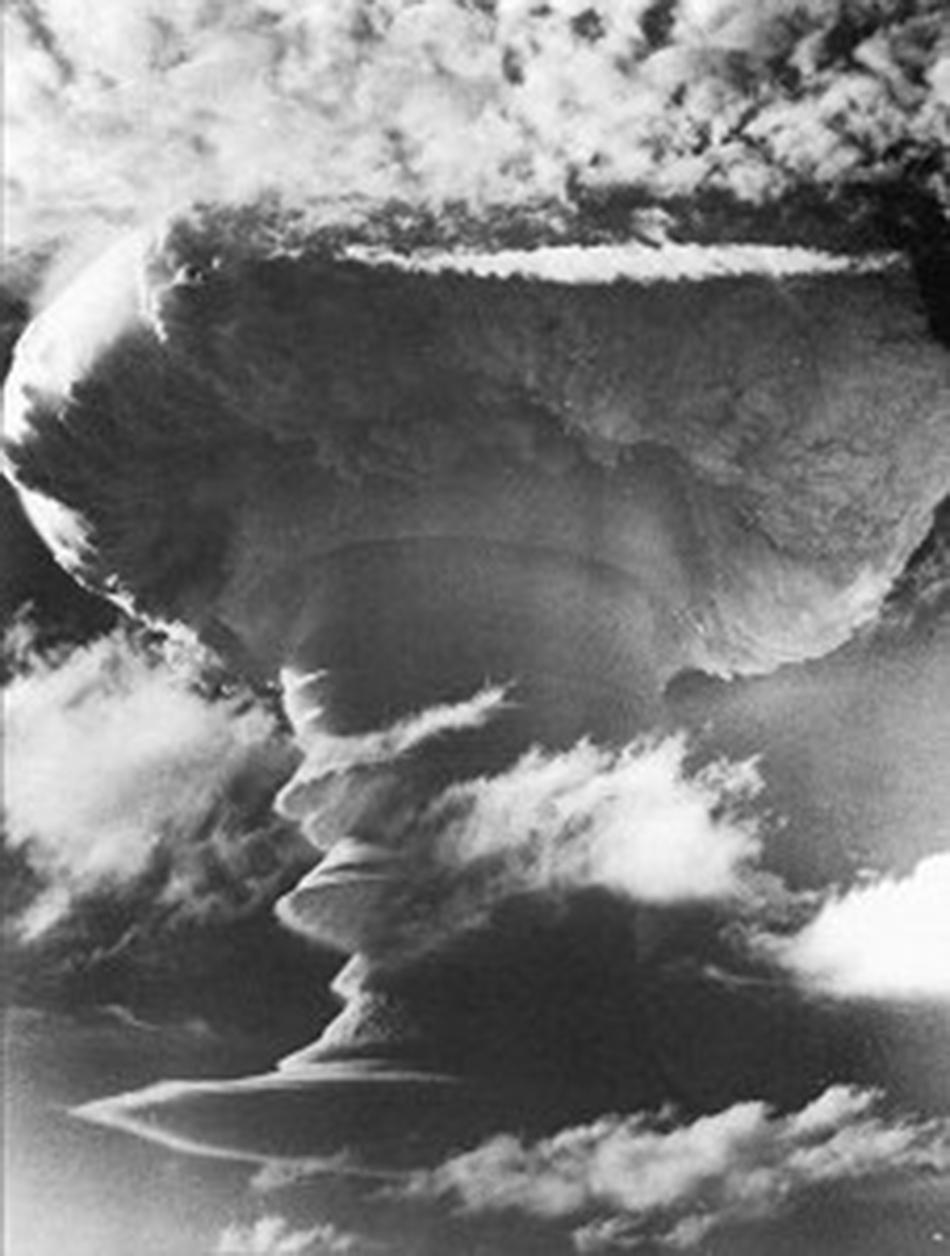
The first successful British hydrogen bomb test (Operation Grapple X)

Funding for the Rocket Propulsion Establishment was niggardly, and in 1947 the Chief of the Royal Naval Scientific Service (CRNSS), Frederick Brundrett, recruited Cook as his Director of Physical Research. In this capacity, Cook was mainly concerned with underwater warfare, particularly the detection of submarines. In 1950, Brundrett became Deputy Chief Scientific Adviser to the Ministry of Defence to Sir Henry Tizard, and Cook succeeded him as CRNSS. He was made a Companion of the Order of the Bath on 1 January 1951. Tizard retired soon after the 1951 election that returned Winston Churchill's Conservative Party to office, and was succeeded by Sir John Cockcroft. But Cockcroft was also the director of the Atomic Energy Research Establishment at Harwell, Oxfordshire, and found himself unable to devote sufficient time to both roles. He therefore was succeeded as Chief Scientific Adviser to the Ministry of Defence by Brundrett in 1954. Brundrett asked Cook to become the chairman of the Defence Research Policy Committee.

On 27 July 1954, Cabinet agreed to develop the hydrogen bomb. This task would fall most heavily on the shoulders of Sir William Penney, who was appointed the head of the Weapons Group of the newly created United Kingdom Atomic Energy Authority (UKAEA). To help him, Penney suggested Cook be appointed as his deputy. Sir Geoffrey Taylor supported this, and the Lord President of the Council, the Marquess of Salisbury, persuaded the First Sea Lord, Sir Rhoderick McGrigor, to release Cook to work with Penney. Cook commenced work at the Atomic Weapons Establishment at Aldermaston on 1 September 1954. His task was to manage the British hydrogen bomb programme. He confessed to the chief scientist, Samuel Curran, "I'm not a real scientist."

Although Penney and Cook had very different temperaments, they forged a good working relationship. Under Cook, "the establishment ran like clockwork... everything was well-documented; there was a lot of open discussion; and everything operated on a very short time scale." Cook kept a tight rein on the work through the Weapons Development Policy Committee, which he created in April 1956. The consensus of scientists who worked on the project was that Britain would not have developed the hydrogen bomb without Cook, although Cook gave the credit to Penney. Cook was present as the scientific director of the Operation Grapple nuclear tests at Malden Island in May and June 1957, and the successful thermonuclear test at Christmas Island in November 1957. He was created a knight bachelor in the 1958 New Year Honours.

== UK Atomic Energy Authority ==
On 1 February 1958, Cook became the UKAEA's Member for Engineering and Production vice Sir Christopher Hinton, who had left to become chairman of the Central Electricity Generating Board. In the wake of an inquiry by Lord Fleck, production was separated from the UKAEA's Industry Group in July 1959, and Cook became Member for Development and Engineering. In April 1961, these two functions were also separated, and Cook became the head of the Reactor Group. The British government decided in 1957 that electricity generation by nuclear power would be promoted, and that there would be a building programme to achieve 5,000 to 6,000 MW capacity by 1965, a quarter of UK's generating needs.

Cook was responsible for the four magnox reactors at Calder Hall, the four reactors under construction at Chapel Cross, and the uranium enrichment plant at Capenhurst. From Hinton he had inherited a conflict of responsibilities for reactor development between the Industry Group and Cockcroft's Research Group . Cockcroft wanted it in the Research Group, and proposed building a research centre in Winfrith with low-powered research reactors for testing various combinations of coolants, neutron moderators and nuclear fuels. In the end, Cockcroft prevailed and Winfrith was built. Cook mainly dealt with the development of new reactors. A number of types were developed, including the Advanced Gas-Cooled Reactor (AGR) at Windscale, considered a natural successor to the Magnox reactors; the Fast Breeder Reactor (FBR) at Dounreay; the high-temperature Dragon reactor at Winfrith. In addition, under the 1958 US–UK Mutual Defence Agreement, the Royal Navy received access to Pressurized Water Reactor (PWR) technology used in US nuclear submarines. He was elected a fellow of the Royal Society in 1962.

== Ministry of Defence ==
In 1960, Cook returned to the Ministry of Defence as one of two deputies to the Chief Scientific Adviser to the Ministry of Defence, Sir Solly Zuckerman, the other being Alan Cottrell. This was a turbulent time for the Ministry, with tight budgetary constraints leading to heated debates over procurement of new weapons systems, none more so than the BAC TSR-2, which was eventually cancelled. Cook was involved in negotiations with the French, and later German and Italian governments, to build a replacement, which eventually saw service with the RAF as the Panavia Tornado. He also managed to salvage a troubled project known as PT428, which became the Rapier surface-to-air missile.

The controversial 1966 Defence White Paper led to the resignation of Zuckerman and then Cottrell. Cook then served as the Chief Scientific Adviser to the Ministry of Defence from 1966 until 1970, when he retired from the civil service, although he chaired nuclear safety committees until 1981. He was involved in several projects including the SEPECAT Jaguar, the Mallard communications system, and the FH70 howitzer. In 1967, the Prime Minister, Harold Wilson sent Cook to brief the French military attaché in London, Colonel André Thoulouze, on the British hydrogen bomb project. The French hydrogen bomb project was stalled, and Wilson hoped that providing some assistance might influence the President of France, Charles de Gaulle, to approve the accession of the UK to the European Communities. He gave the French indications of paths that would not work, and suggested that their proposed design was too complex. This proved to be sufficient to set the French scientists on the right track, and France successfully tested a hydrogen bomb on 24 August 1968. Despite this, de Gaulle vetoed Britain's membership of the EEC a second time. For his services, Cook was raised to a Knight Commander of the Order of the Bath in the 1970 Birthday Honours.

== Later life ==
After Rolls-Royce went bankrupt in 1970, the Secretary of State for Defence, Lord Carrington, asked Cook to chair a committee to determine whether the development of the RB211 jet engine should be continued. He recommended that it should be. When Rolls-Royce was nationalised in 1971, he was appointed as a director of the company. He retired as a director in 1976, but continued to assist the company for four more years. He was a director of GEC Marconi Electronics from 1972 to 1979, and Marconi International Marine from 1971 to 1975. He was also a consultant to British Telecom from 1982 to 1985.

Cook suffered a massive stroke from which he did not regain consciousness, and died in London's Westminster Hospital on 16 September 1987.
