= John Corner =

British mathematician and physicist

- Born: 24 January 1916; Sunderland, England
- Died: 22 July 1996 (aged 80); Devon, England
- Citizenship: British
- Education: Peterhouse, Cambridge
- Known for: British hydrogen bomb programme
- Awards: Commander of the Order of the British Empire (1958)
- Scientific career
- Fields: Mathematics; Physics
- Workplaces: Board of Ordnance; Fort Halstead; Atomic Weapons Research Establishment

John Corner, CBE (24 January 1916 – 22 July 1996) was a British mathematician and physicist. He is best known for his work on the interior ballistics of guns and the British hydrogen bomb programme.

== Biography ==
John Corner was born in Sunderland, England, on 24 January 1916, the elder son of John and Elizabeth Corner. After his family's move to Newcastle-upon-Tyne, he won a scholarship to Newcastle Royal Grammar School where he won a number of academic prizes.He specialised in mathematics and physics and was encouraged by his headmaster to apply for a Goldsmiths scholarship to allow him to attend university. He obtained this scholarship and went to Peterhouse, Cambridge, where he was awarded firsts in Parts I and II of the Mathematical Tripos in 1937. He then went on to postgraduate study at the Mathematics Laboratory, Cambridge, under the then Director Professor John Lennard-Jones. He was awarded his PhD in 1946.

At the outbreak of war in 1939, Lennard-Jones and his research team were taken over by the Ministry of Supply. Corner joined a group working on the interior ballistics of guns for the Ordance Board. In 1942 Lennard-Jones and his team were moved to the Armaments Research Department at Fort Halsted near Sevenoaks, Kent. There Corner worked with Dr. J.W.Maccoll with whom he published many papers on the thermodynamics and thermochemistry of guns. After the war he wrote a textbook on the subject, Theory of the Interior Ballistics of Guns, which was published in 1950 and became the standard text on the subject. Whilst at Fort Halsted Corner met Kathleen Thurston, a mathematics graduate and PA to Lennard-Jones. They married in 1945 and had a son and a daughter.

In 1945, Corner and his colleague Herbert Pike were detailed to help Dr (later Baron) William Penney calculate the yields of the Hiroshima and Nagasaki bombs. Penney had been one of Britain's senior scientists at the American Los Alamos project in New Mexico and in 1947 Penney was directed to form a secret atomic research group inside Fort Halsted, named 'High Explosive Research' (HER). Penney considered Corner to be the best scientist on his staff and had no hesitation in recruiting him to lead the theoretical group. In 1947 Corner made the first of many research visits to the Los Alamos Scientific Laboratory.

Corner received rapid promotion and in 1950 he reached the rank of Superintendent, becoming the youngest ever appointee to that grade. With Penney, Corner and Pike played a crucial role in the design of the British A-bomb introducing important modifications to a design based on the Nagasaki bomb. This was successfully tested in the Operation Hurricane test off the Australian coast in October 1952.

In 1953, Corner was transferred to the Atomic Weapons Research Establishment at Aldermaston where he worked on the British hydrogen bomb programme holding the post of Head of Mathematical Physics until his retirement in 1975. One of the great challenges of Corner's career came with the Cabinet’s decision in 1954 to develop the H-bomb. Corner and his division had to lead the way into new scientific territory, meeting physical problems far more complex than those of A-bombs and with little computing power available for the endless calculations needed. As the calculation of the outcome of a nuclear explosion was a matter of repetitive calculation of a large number of sequential events and with hand calculating machines this could take many months, Corner set up a strong computer-orientated group who applied pressure on the computer companies such as Ferranti and IBM to produce bigger and faster machines that could be used for these intensive calculations.

The successful Operation Grapple tests at Christmas Island in 1957 and 1958 not only provided a basis for a British nuclear deterrent but facilitated the signing of the 1958 Bilateral Treaty for Cooperation on Nuclear Weapons with the United States. The first exchanges under this treaty took place in September 1958 with Corner playing a leading role, which he maintained until his retirement.

For his work on the hydrogen bomb, Corner was appointed a Commander of the Order of the British Empire in the 1958 Birthday Honours for his 'outstanding scientific ability, organising capacity and drive, and his exceptional contribution to the project'. Corner retired in 1975 after 36 years of government service. He then moved with his wife to Dartmouth, Devon where he enjoyed 20 happy years of retirement. He died peacefully on 22 July 1996.

== Bibliography ==
- Corner, John. Theory of the Interior Ballistics of Guns. New York: Wiley. OCLC 678909524.
