= Combined Development Agency =

The Combined Development Agency (CDA), originally the Combined Development Trust (CDT), was a defense purchasing authority established in 1944 by the governments of the United States and the United Kingdom. Its role was to ensure adequate supplies of uranium for the respective countries' weapons development programs.

The agency initiated a range of incentives to several countries to encourage exploration and a fast buildup of mineral reserves. The main countries targeted for the programs were the US, Canada, South Africa, and to a limited extent Australia. The countries tried to monopolize on the resources of the territories they owned or that had hardly any claim. The Belgian Congo was an example of the third world place that was used for its resources.

In Australia, uranium ore from a number of mines was processed at the purpose built Port Pirie Uranium Treatment Complex which operated under contract to the CDA by the Government of South Australia between 1955 and 1962.

== History ==
General Leslie Groves was in charge of the Manhattan Project. He was a major campaigner for the creation of the CDT because he saw the importance of obtaining an adequate amount of uranium not only to complete the needs of the Manhattan Project, but also so that the Soviet Union would be denied access. The world's total stockpile of uranium was unknown, so the focus was on securing access to the most uranium possible. He first created a program, Murray Hill Area Project, to seek locations of uranium ore based on reports from mostly foreign documents. Later, the program also focused on thorium when it was discovered that thorium could be converted into uranium.
