= Edwin Flavell =

Edwin Flavell may refer to:

- Edwin Flavell (British Army officer) (1898–1993)
- Edwin Flavell (RAF officer) (1922–2014)
