= Roderick Learoyd =

British RAF officer & VC (1913-1996)

Roderick Alastair Brook Learoyd
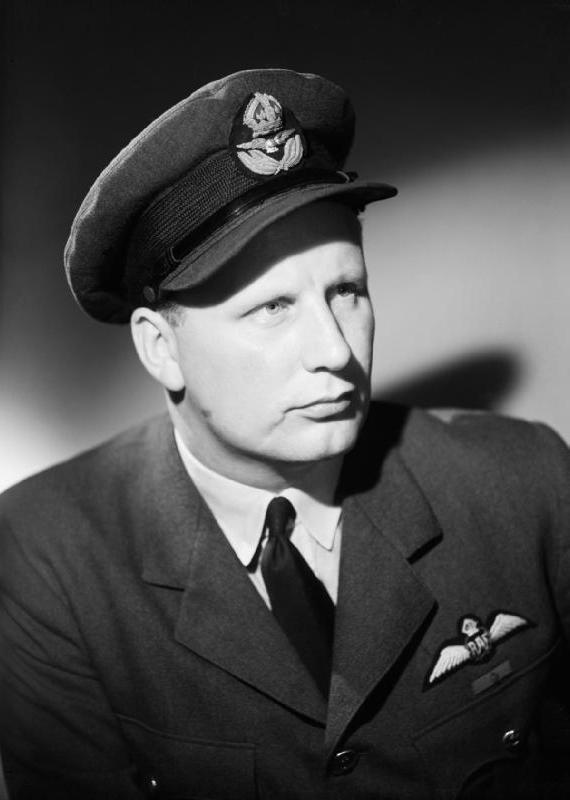
- Born: 5 February 1913; Folkestone, Kent
- Died: 24 January 1996 (aged 82); Rustington, West Sussex
- Military career
- Allegiance: United Kingdom
- Branch: Royal Air Force
- Service years: 1936–1958
- Rank: Wing commander
- Units: No. 49 Squadron RAF; No. 44 Squadron RAF
- Conflicts: Second World War
- Awards: Victoria Cross

Wing Commander Roderick Alastair Brook Learoyd, VC (5 February 1913 – 24 January 1996) was a Royal Air Force bomber pilot and recipient of the Victoria Cross, the highest award for gallantry in the face of the enemy that can be awarded to British and Commonwealth forces.

== Early life ==
Born in Folkestone on 5 February 1913 and educated at Hydneye House Preparatory School, Baldslow, Sussex, and Wellington College, Berkshire, Learoyd then attended the Chelsea College of Aeronautical and Automobile Engineering. Learoyd lived in Argentina for two years as a farmer.

== RAF career ==
Learoyd decided to join the Royal Air Force (RAF) and was accepted in March 1936. He took a short service commission and was commissioned as an acting pilot officer on 18 May 1936. He was posted to No. 49 Squadron, Bomber Command equipped with Hawker Hinds at RAF Worthy Down, and was regraded and confirmed as a pilot officer on 23 March 1937. In March 1938, No. 49 Squadron moved to Scampton and became the first RAF squadron to re-equip with the new Handley Page Hampden bomber. Learoyd was promoted to flying officer on 23 December 1938.

On 3 September 1939, two days after the outbreak of the Second World War, six Hampdens from No. 83 Squadron and three from No. 49 Squadron (including Learoyd) left Scampton on an "armed reconnaissance" sortie over the North Sea. During the next ten months Learoyd participated in 23 more bombing sorties, and was an acting flight lieutenant when the following deed took place for which he was awarded the VC, gazetted on 20 August 1940.

On 12 August 1940 eleven Hampdens – six from No. 49 Squadron, five from No. 83 Squadron – were detailed to destroy the old aqueduct carrying the canal over the river Ems, north of Münster. Flight Lieutenant Learoyd was one of the pilots briefed to bomb. Learoyd was detailed as pilot of Hampden P4403, "EA-M", and his crew comprised Pilot Officer John Lewis (Observer), Sergeant Walter Ellis (wireless operator-gunner) and Leading Aircraftman William Rich (ventral gunner).

Of the other Hampdens that made the attack that night, two were destroyed and two more were badly hit. Flight Lieutenant Learoyd took his plane into the target at only 150 feet, in the full glare of the searchlights and flak barrage all round him. After commencing its bombing run Learoyd's aircraft was badly damaged, including a ruptured hydraulic system, resulting in inoperable wing flaps and a useless undercarriage. Wing damage, though serious, had fortunately missed the wing petrol tanks. Despite this damage the bombs were duly dropped and Learoyd managed to get his crippled plane back to England where he decided that a night landing would be too dangerous for his crippled aircraft and so circled base until first light, finally safely landing without causing injury to his crew or further damage to his aircraft.

The Victoria Cross was awarded at an investiture on 9 September 1940, by which time Learoyd, taken off operations and promoted to substantive flight lieutenant, was acting temporarily as personal assistant to Air Chief Marshal Sir Sir Robert Brooke-Popham.

=== Victoria Cross citation ===
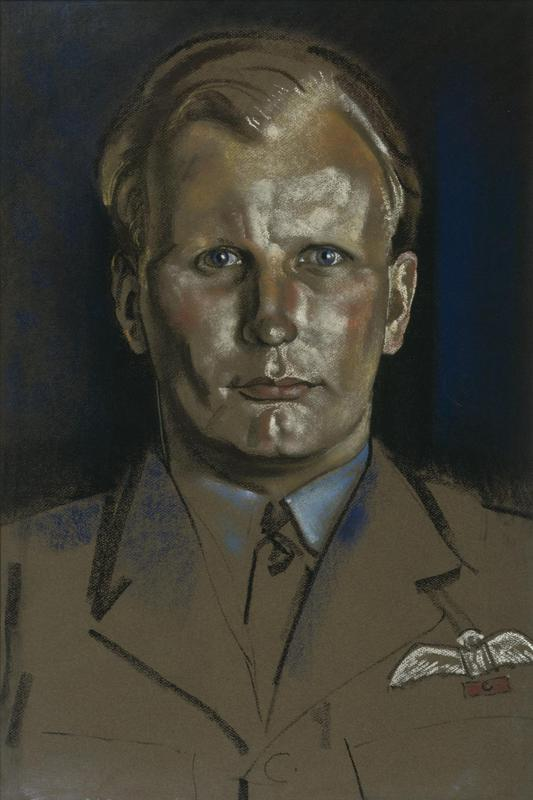
Squadron Leader R A B Learoyd, VC. by Eric Kennington (1940) (Art.IWM ART LD 412)

The announcement and accompanying citation for the decoration was published in a supplement to the London Gazette on 20 August 1940, reading:

Air Ministry, 20th August, 1940.

The KING has been graciously pleased to confer the VICTORIA CROSS on the undermentioned officer in recognition of most conspicuous bravery :-

Acting Flight Lieutenant Roderick Alastair Brook Learoyd 37860 :-

This officer, as first pilot of a Hampden aircraft, has repeatedly shown the highest conception of his duty and complete indifference to personal danger in making attacks at the lowest altitudes regardless of opposition. On the night of 12th August, 1940, he was detailed to attack a special objective on the Dortmund Ems Canal. He had attacked this objective on a previous occasion and was well aware of the risks entailed. To achieve success it was necessary to approach from a direction well known to the enemy, through a lane of especially disposed anti-aircraft defences, and in the face of the most intense point-blank fire from guns of all calibres. The reception of the preceding aircraft might well have deterred the stoutest heart, all being hit and two lost. Flight Lieutenant Learoyd nevertheless made his attack at 150 feet, his aircraft being repeatedly hit and large pieces of the main plane torn away. He was almost blinded by the glare of many searchlights at close range, but pressed home this attack with the greatest resolution and skill. He subsequently brought his wrecked aircraft home and, as the landing flaps were inoperative and the undercarriage indicators out of action, waited for dawn in the vicinity of his aerodrome before landing, which he accomplished without causing injury to his crew or further damage to the aircraft. The high courage, skill and determination, which this officer has invariably displayed on many occasions in the face of the enemy sets an example which is unsurpassed.

== Later career ==
Learoyd was promoted to squadron leader by 1942. He served in No. 44 Squadron for the remainder of the war. After surviving the war, Learoyd returned to civilian life, first as a VIP pilot and later as an export sales manager in the motor industry. He remained in the RAF reserves until 9 February 1958, when he retired with the rank of wing commander. His VC is on display in the Lord Ashcroft Gallery at the Imperial War Museum, London.

== Bibliography ==
- Ingleton, Roy (2011). Kent VCs. Pen and Sword Books. ISBN 978-1848844094.
