= Kenneth Hubbard =

Royal Air Force officer

Kenneth Gilbert Hubbard
- Born: 26 February 1920; Norwich, Norfolk, England
- Died: 21 January 2004 (aged 83) Blythburgh, Suffolk, England
- Allegiance: United Kingdom
- Branch: Royal Air Force
- Service years: 1940–1966
- Rank: Group Captain
- Commands: RAF Scampton; RAF El Adem; No. 49 Squadron RAF; RAF Shaibah; No. 104 Squadron RAF
- Conflicts: World War II: Italian Campaign; Combined Bomber Offensive
- Awards: Officer of the Order of the British Empire; Distinguished Flying Cross; Air Force Cross

Group Captain Kenneth Gilbert Hubbard OBE DFC AFC (26 February 1920 – 21 January 2004) was the pilot of an RAF Vickers Valiant bomber which dropped Britain's first live thermonuclear weapon (H-Bomb) in Operation Grapple in the Central Pacific Ocean in May 1957.

== Early life ==
Kenneth Gilbert Hubbard was born in Norwich in Norfolk on 26 February 1920, the son of Gilbert Claud Hubbard, a mechanical engineer and professional association football player who played for Norwich City, and his wife Florence née Dack. He was educated at Norwich Technical College from 1932 to 1935, where he trained as a draughtsman. He then worked as a draughtsman for Stevensons of Norwich.

== Military service ==
=== Second World War ===
After the outbreak of the Second World War, Hubbard joined the Royal Air Force (RAF) on 21 June 1940. He earned his wings at No. 2 Flying Training School RAF at RAF Brize Norton, and was commissioned as a pilot officer in May 1941. He was posted to No. 2 Central Flying Training School at RAF Cranwell in June 1941, and then to No. 12 Flying Training School RAF at RAF Grantham in July 1942 as an instructor. In December 1942 he was posted to No. 311 Ferry Training Unit RAF at RAF Moreton-in-Marsh, where he did a conversion course on the Vickers Wellington medium bomber. He flew one out to Foggia Airfield Complex in Italy in January 1944, and joined No. 70 Squadron RAF, which operated the Wellington. He was awarded the Distinguished Flying Cross on 20 April 1945. His citation noted that he had "taken part in many attacks in close support of the Fifth and Eighth armies and against marshalling yards in the Po valley. One night in May 1944 he participated in a special low-level attack on an important railway bridge in north Italy." From January to May 1945 he was a pilot instructor at RAF Qastina in Palestine. He then returned to No. 70 Squadron RAF in Italy, which was now flying B24 Liberator bombers from Tortorella.

=== Service 1946 to 1957 ===
While on leave in the United Kingdom, Hubbard married Beatrice Daphne Taylor on 19 January 1946. He went back to the Middle East in May 1946, where he flew Avro Lancaster bombers with No. 104 Squadron RAF from RAF Abu Sueir RAF Shallufa in Egypt. In October he was posted to Empire Air Armament School at RAF Manby as a flying instructor. He became a flight commander at the RAF Flying College there in July 1949. He returned to the Middle East in April 1951, as commander of RAF Shaibah during the Abadan Crisis, for which he was made an Officer of the Order of the British Empire in the 1953 New Year Honours. His wife divorced him on 28 July 1953. In September he reported to RAF Swinderby for a refresher course on the Wellington and Vickers Varsity at No. 201 Advanced Flying School RAF, and then one at No. 242 Operational Conversion Unit RAF at RAF Dishforth on the Handley Page Hastings and Vickers Valetta.

After an appointment as Personal Staff Officer to the Air Member for Personnel, Hubbard completed the course at the RAF Staff College, Bracknell, in January 1956. The graduates were allowed to express three preferences for their next assignment, and as he had just completed a staff posting, Hubbard asked to be posted to the new V bomber force for flying duties. His request was granted, but he was first sent to RAF Strubby for an all-weather jet refresher course, flying the Gloster Meteor, then to No. 231 Operational Conversion Unit RAF at RAF Bassingbourn for training on the English Electric Canberra, and finally to No. 232 Operational Conversion Unit RAF at RAF Gaydon for training on the Vickers Valiant, the first of the RAF's new generation of V-bombers. In September 1956, he assumed command of the newly reformed No. 49 Squadron RAF at RAF Wittering, flying the Valiant.

=== Operation Grapple ===
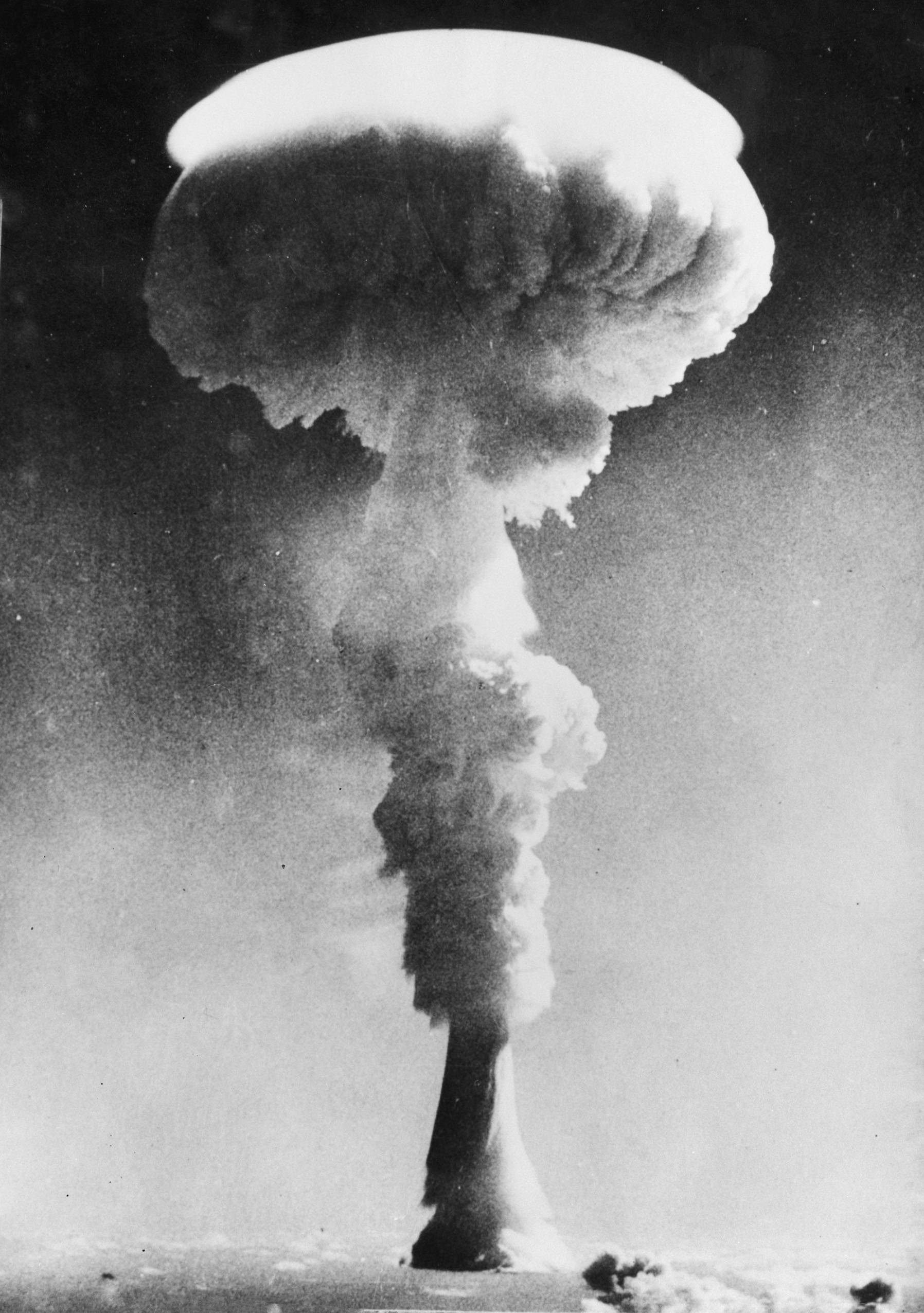
A mushroom cloud rising over Malden Island after the first British hydrogen bomb test on 15 May 1957

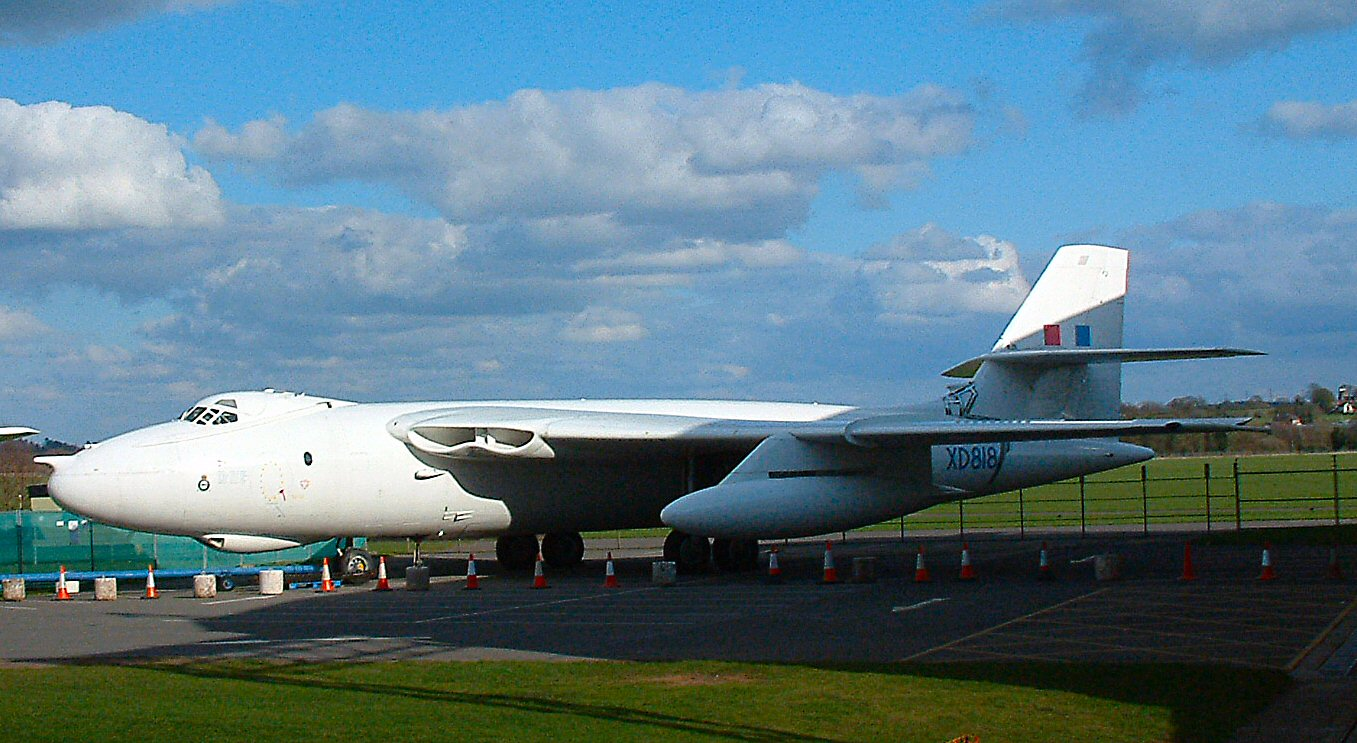
Vickers Valiant B1 XD818, flown by Hubbard during Operation Grapple, now at Royal Air Force Museum Midlands

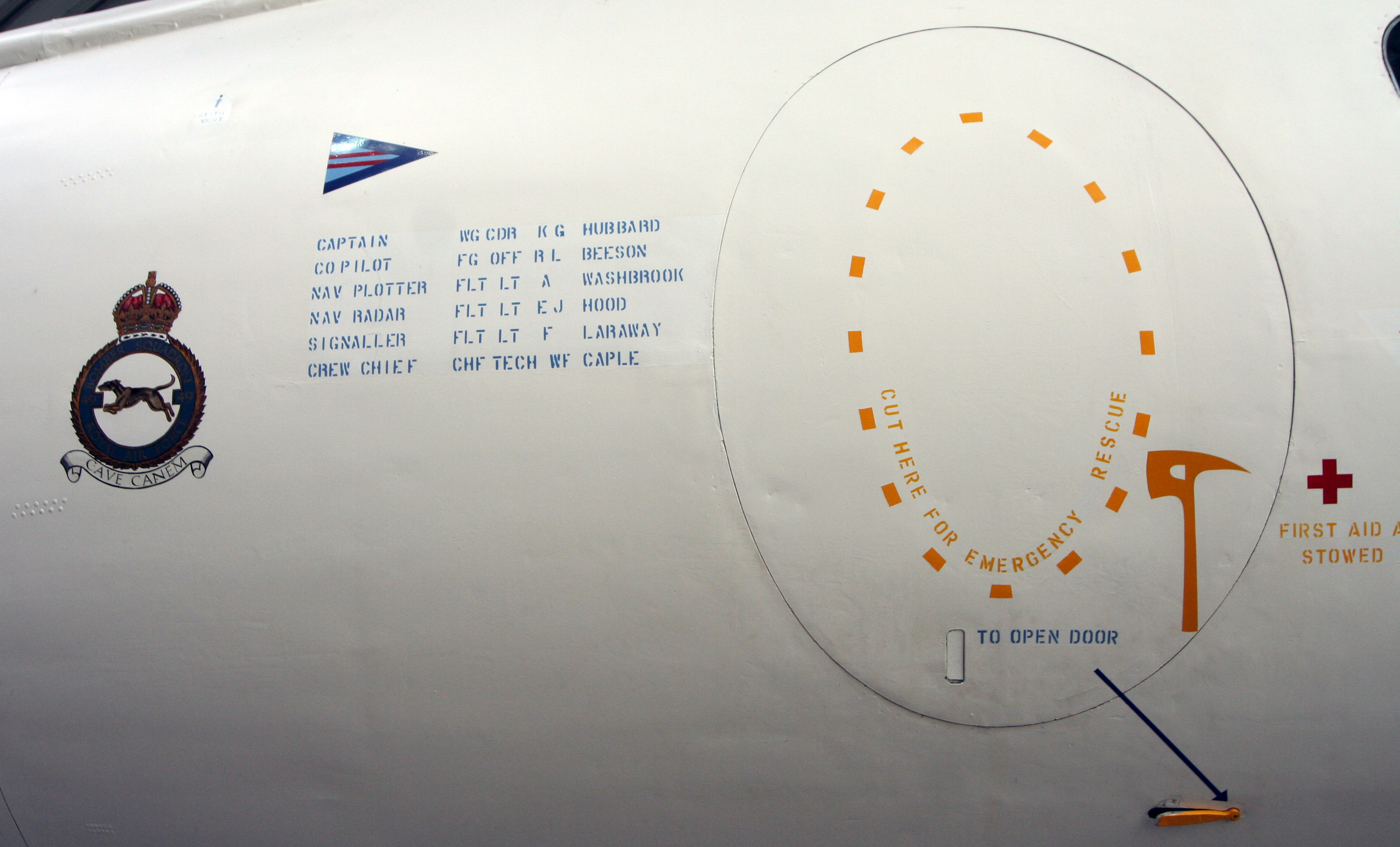
The crewmen's entry door on the side of the forward fuselage of Vickers Valiant B1 XD818, with the names of Hubbard and his crew

No. 49 Squadron was assigned to Air Vice Marshal Wilfrid Oulton's Operation Grapple Task Force to conduct nuclear tests at Christmas Island in the Pacific Ocean as part of the British hydrogen bomb programme.

No 49 Squadron had eight Valiants, but only four deployed: XD818, piloted by Hubbard, now a Wing Commander; XD822, piloted by Squadron Leader L. D. (Dave) Roberts; XD823, piloted by Squadron Leader Arthur Steele; and XD824, piloted by Squadron Leader Barney Millett. The other four Valiants remained at RAF Wittering, where they were used as courier aircraft for bomb components. The first mission was flown by Hubbard in XD818, with Millett and XD824 as the "grandstand" observation aircraft.

The bomb was dropped from 45,000 feet (14,000 m) off the shore of Malden Island at 10:38 local time on 15 May 1957. Hubbard missed the target by just 418 yards (382 m). He became the first British pilot to drop a live hydrogen bomb. From the bomb developers' view, the device turned out to be a failure; its yield was estimated at 300 kilotonnes of TNT (1,300 TJ), far below its designed capability.

Hubbard and his four crew members were awarded the Air Force Cross in the 1957 Birthday Honours. His aircraft, Vickers Valiant XD818, is now on display in the Royal Air Force Museum Midlands at RAF Cosford.

=== Service 1957 to 1966 ===
After the Grapple tests Hubbard served at HQ RAF Bomber Command from 1959 to 1961. He was promoted to group captain, and commanded RAF El Adem in Libya. In 1963, he assumed command of RAF Scampton, the base of the Avro Vulcan bombers of Nos 27, 83 and 617 Squadrons RAF equipped with the Blue Steel standoff missile. His final appointment was Group Captain Training at HQ RAF Transport Command. He retired from the RAF in 1966.

== Later life ==
After leaving the RAF in 1966, Hubbard tried his hand at farming in the West Country. The venture was unsuccessful, but he did meet Margaret Grubb, whom he married at the register office in Blyth, Suffolk, on 14 March 1975, and he moved to Margaret's home at Blythburgh in Suffolk.

Members of 49 Squadron serving during the Grapple nuclear test series formed a Megaton Club and with Hubbard as its president, and they met annually at the Royal Air Force Club at 128 Piccadilly in London.

In 1974, Hubbard became Director of Sales and Marketing of the Vehicle Air Conditioning Division of his cousin Geoffrey Hubbard's Hubbard–Reader Group of refrigeration engineering companies. He retired from this position in 1982.

Hubbard chaired the local review committee for parole at HM Prison Blundeston, and was involved with the local Air Training Corps and the RAF Benevolent Fund. His wife Margaret died in 1997. He had no children from either of his marriages. With Michael Simmons, a director at Hubbard engineering, Hubbard wrote a book about his experience as the commander of No. 49 Squadron in Operation Grapple. The book was published by Ian Allan in 1985 under the title of Operation Grapple. A new edition with a different title of Dropping Britain's First H-Bomb was published by Pen and Sword in 2008. Hubbard died in Blythburgh on 22 January 2004.

== See also ==
- Ted Flavell (1922–2014), pilot of the RAF bomber which dropped Britain's first live atomic bomb in 1956
