= Vickers Valiant =

British four-jet high-altitude bomber

Valiant
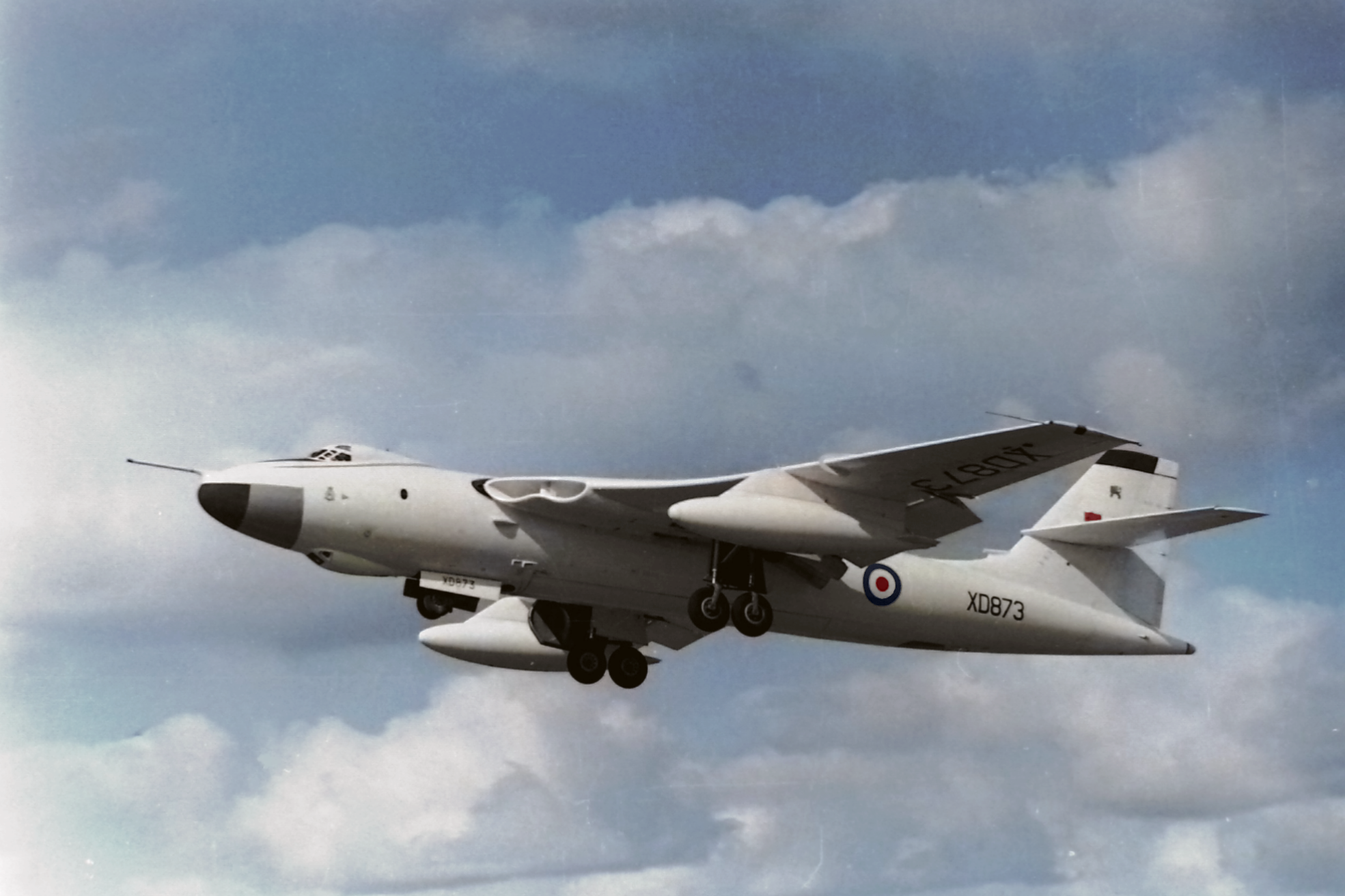
- Valiant XD873 in 1962

General information
- Type: Strategic bomber or aerial refuelling tanker
- Manufacturer: Vickers-Armstrongs
- Designer: George Edwards
- Status: Retired
- Primary user: Royal Air Force
- Number built: 107

History
- Manufactured: 1951–1957
- Introduction date: 1955
- First flight: 18 May 1951
- Retired: January 1965

The Vickers Valiant was a British high-altitude jet bomber designed to carry nuclear weapons, and in the 1950s and 1960s was part of the Royal Air Force's "V bomber" strategic deterrent force. It was developed by Vickers-Armstrongs in response to Specification B.35/46 issued by the Air Ministry for a nuclear-armed jet-powered bomber. The Valiant was the first of the V bombers to become operational, and was followed by the Handley Page Victor and the Avro Vulcan. The Valiant is the only V bomber to have dropped live nuclear weapons in testing.

All eight British nuclear weapons that were ever detonated after being dropped from an aircraft (see Operation Buffalo and Operation Grapple) were dropped by Valiants of No. 49 Squadron RAF.

In 1956, Valiants operating from Malta flew conventional bombing missions over Egypt for Operation Musketeer during the Suez Crisis. From 1956 until early 1966 the main Valiant force was used in the nuclear deterrence role in the confrontation between NATO and the Warsaw Pact powers. Other squadrons undertook aerial refuelling, aerial reconnaissance and Electronic Warfare.

In 1962, in response to advances in Soviet Union surface-to-air missile (SAM) technology, the V-force fleet including the Valiant changed from high-level flying to flying at low-level to avoid high altitude SAM attacks. In 1964 it was found that Valiants showed fatigue and crystalline corrosion in wing rear spar attachment forgings. (Note: The rapid development of aircraft during World War II led to a demand for very high strength aluminium alloy, especially for use in highly loaded tension and compression members. One result was a zinc/magnesium based alloy given the identification DTD 683. It was ideal for such applications as wing spar caps providing, as was the case with wartime operations, the life of the aircraft was short. Use in early post-War transport aircraft showed that DTD 683 was very crack-sensitive and hence prone to fatigue failure. In many cases it had to be replaced by steel components. DTD 683 is an example of a material developed to meet a particular need, but whose wider characteristics were not investigated until too late. D.Howe 1998) In late 1964 a repair programme was underway, but a change of Government led to the new Minister of Defence Denis Healey deciding that the Valiant should be retired from service, and this happened in early 1965. The Victor and Vulcan V-bombers remained in service until the 1980s.

== Development ==
=== Background and origins ===
In November 1944, the Joint Technical Warfare Committee, along with a separate committee chaired by Sir Henry Tizard, examined the future potential of "weapons of war" and the accompanying Tizard Report published on 3 July 1945 made specific policy directions for the Royal Air Force (RAF) Bomber Command. After the Second World War, the policy of using heavy four-engined bombers for massed raids continued into the immediate postwar period; the Avro Lincoln, an updated version of the Avro Lancaster, became the RAF's standard bomber. In 1946, the Air Staff issued Operational Requirements OR229 and OR230 for the development of turbojet-powered heavy bombers capable of carrying nuclear weapons at high altitude and speed, without defensive armament, to act as a deterrent to hostile powers and, if deterrence failed, to perform a nuclear strike. In conjunction with this ambition, Britain set about developing its own atomic weapons.

In January 1947, the British Air Ministry issued Specification B.35/46 for an advanced jet bomber intended to carry nuclear weapons and to fly near the speed of sound at altitudes of 50,000 ft (15,000 m). Three firms: A.V. Roe, Handley-Page and Vickers-Armstrongs submitted advanced designs intended to meet the stringent requirements. While Short Brothers submitted a design, by Geoffrey T. R. Hill, that was judged too ambitious, the Air Staff accepted another submission from the company for a separate requirement, B.14/46, as "insurance" in case the advanced B.35/46 effort ran into trouble. Aviation authors Bill Gunston and Peter Gilchrist described Specification B.14/46 as "calling for little more than a traditional aircraft fitted with jet engines" Short submitted a conservative design to meet B.14/46, which became the S.A.4 Sperrin. Two prototypes were completed, the first conducting its maiden flight in 1951, but the Sperrin was ultimately relegated to research and development purposes only.

Vickers had emerged from World War II as one of the world's pre-eminent companies in the field of aeronautical manufacturing and development. The company operated its own secretive Skunk Works-like development organisation based at Weybridge, Surrey, which had been involved in several secret wartime development projects. It was this secretive division where the early development of the Valiant took place, including the later assembly of the initial two prototypes. Vickers initially produced a six-engine jet bomber design proposal to meet Specification B.35/46. As progress in the development of more powerful jet engines was made, this was re-worked to a four-engine proposal in 1948. The proposed design submitted by Vickers was relatively straightforward, being less aerodynamically advanced in comparison to competing bids made by rival firms.

Both Handley-Page and Avro had produced advanced designs for the bomber competition. These were produced as the Victor and the Vulcan respectively. The Air Staff decided to award contracts to each company as a form of insurance in case one of the designs failed. The submissions became known as the V bombers, or V-class, with the aircraft given names that started with the letter "V". Vickers' submission had initially been rejected as not being as advanced as the Victor and the Vulcan, but Vickers' chief designer George Edwards lobbied the Air Ministry on the basis that it would be available much sooner than the competition, going so far as to promise that a prototype would be flown by the end of 1951, that subsequent production aircraft would be flown prior to the end of 1953, and that serial deliveries would commence during early 1955. Gaining the bomber contract was considered of crucial importance to the future of aircraft manufacturing at Vickers. "Edwards was supremely confident that Weybridge could deliver the aircraft as specified .. " and "..committed to the brochure performance figures and dates because he thought they knew how to do it". He resisted being pushed to try to more closely match the Victor and Vulcan height and speed requirements or to change equipment from that originally specified as these distractions would jeopardise his promised delivery dates.

Although developing three different aircraft types in response to a single Operational Requirement (OR) was costly, events such as the Berlin Blockade had led to a sense of urgency in providing a deterrent to the Soviet Union from possible acts of aggression in Western Europe.

In April 1948, the Air Staff issued a specification with the designation B.9/48 written around the Type 660 Vickers design; and an 'Instruction to Proceed' was received by Vickers on 16 April 1948.

In February 1949, two prototypes of the Vickers 660 series were ordered. The first was to be fitted with four Rolls-Royce RA.3 Avon turbojet engines, while the second was to be fitted with four Armstrong Siddeley Sapphire engines and was designated the Type 667.

=== Prototypes ===
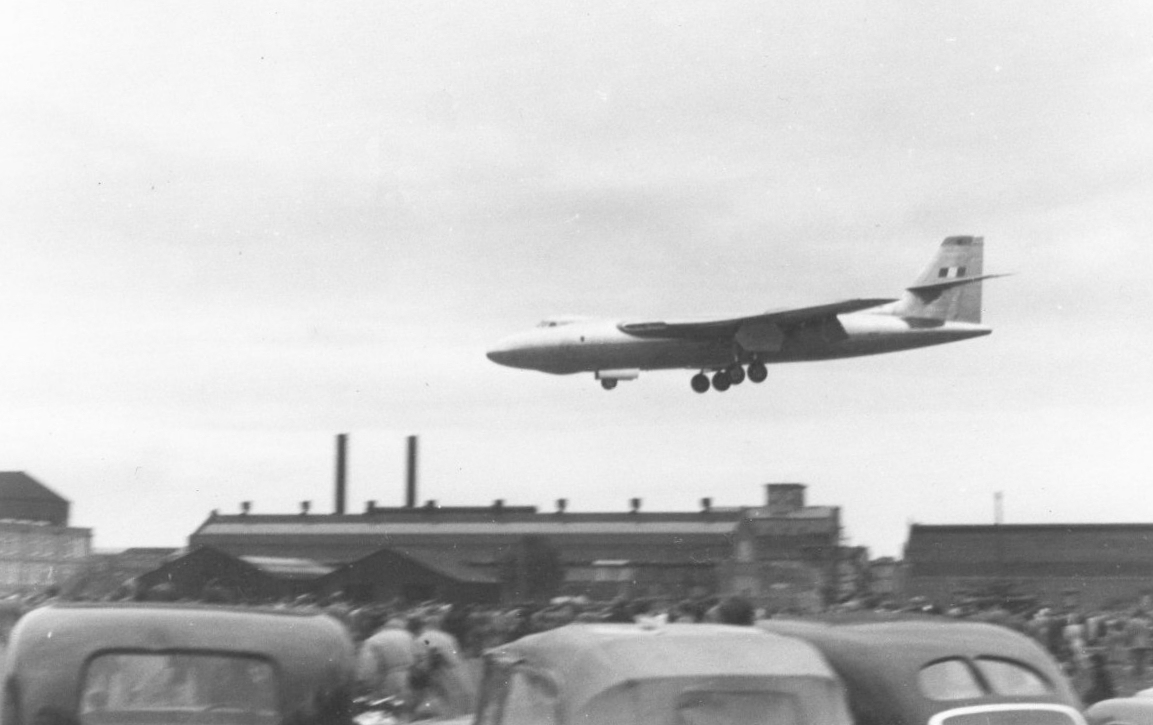
First prototype at the Farnborough Airshow, 1951

On 18 May 1951, the first prototype, serial number WB210 took to the air for its maiden flight, within the deadline that George Edwards had promised, only 27 months since the contract had been issued. This was several months before the competing Short Sperrin; the Sperrin had straight (not swept) wings and was not ordered. The Valiant pilot was Captain Joseph "Mutt" Summers, who had also been the original test pilot on the Supermarine Spitfire, and wanted to add another "first" to his record before he retired. His co-pilot on the first flight was Gabe "Jock" Bryce, who succeeded Summers as Vickers' chief test pilot upon his retirement shortly after. The next month, the Vickers Type 660 was given the official name of "Valiant", reusing the name given to the Vickers Type 131 general-purpose biplane of 1931. (Note: Traditionally, RAF bombers had been named after towns and cities, for example Lancaster, Halifax and Canberra, but new jet aircraft technology reflected a new tradition. The name also fitted in with a tradition of alliteration in aircraft names.) The name Valiant had been selected by a survey of Vickers employees.

On 11 January 1952, the first Valiant prototype was lost while making internal noise measurements for the V.1000 programme. Testing included engine shutdowns and re-lights, one of which caused a fire in the starboard wing; most of the crew managed to escape the aircraft safely, except for the co-pilot, who struck the tail after ejecting.

On 11 April 1952, the second prototype WB215 made its maiden flight, after modifications to the fuel system. It was fitted with more powerful RA.7 Avon engines with 7,500 pounds-force (33 kN) thrust each, rather than the originally planned Sapphires. It also featured more rounded air inlets, replacing the narrow slot-type intakes of the first prototype, to feed sufficient air to the more powerful engines. The short delay until the second prototype became available meant that loss of the prototype did not compromise the development schedule.

=== The Valiant B2 ===
One of the three prototypes was the B.2 version. The B.2 was intended to serve as a Pathfinder aircraft, flying at low level to mark targets for the main bomber force. To cope with increased air turbulence at low level, the B.2 had a strengthened airframe. In particular, the wing was strengthened with the removal of the cut-outs in the wing structure into which the main wheels retracted, allowing the wing torsion box structure to be uninterrupted and giving more room for internal fuel storage. Instead, the main landing gear, which had four wheels instead of the two wheels of the B.1, retracted backwards into large fairings set into the rear of the wings. The B.2 had a lengthened fuselage with a total length of 112 ft 9 in (34.37 m), in contrast to a length of 108 ft 3 in (32.99 m) for the Valiant B.1, with the extra length giving room for more avionics.

The prototype B.2, serial number WJ954 first flew on 4 September 1953. Finished in a gloss black night operations paint scheme, it became known as the "Black Bomber". Its performance at low level was superior to that of the B.1 (or any other V-bomber), particularly at sea level, with the aircraft being cleared for 580 mph (930 km/h) at low level (with speeds of up to 640 mph (1,030 km/h) being reached in testing). This was compared to the B.1 sea-level limit of 414 mph (665 km/h). The Air Ministry ordered 17 production B.2 aircraft, which were to be powered by Rolls-Royce Conway turbofans. Although the Valiant B.2 low-level capabilities were significant, the programme was terminated because the World War 2 "Pathfinder concept" was considered obsolete in the nuclear era. The B.2 prototype was used for tests for a few years, including the clearance of rocket-assisted take-offs, for the Valiant B.1 at hot or high airfields, using two Super-Sprite rocket motors. It also did extensive taxiing tests to investigate the cause of brake judder which caused a fatigue failure of the landing gear. It was scrapped in 1958.

=== Production ===
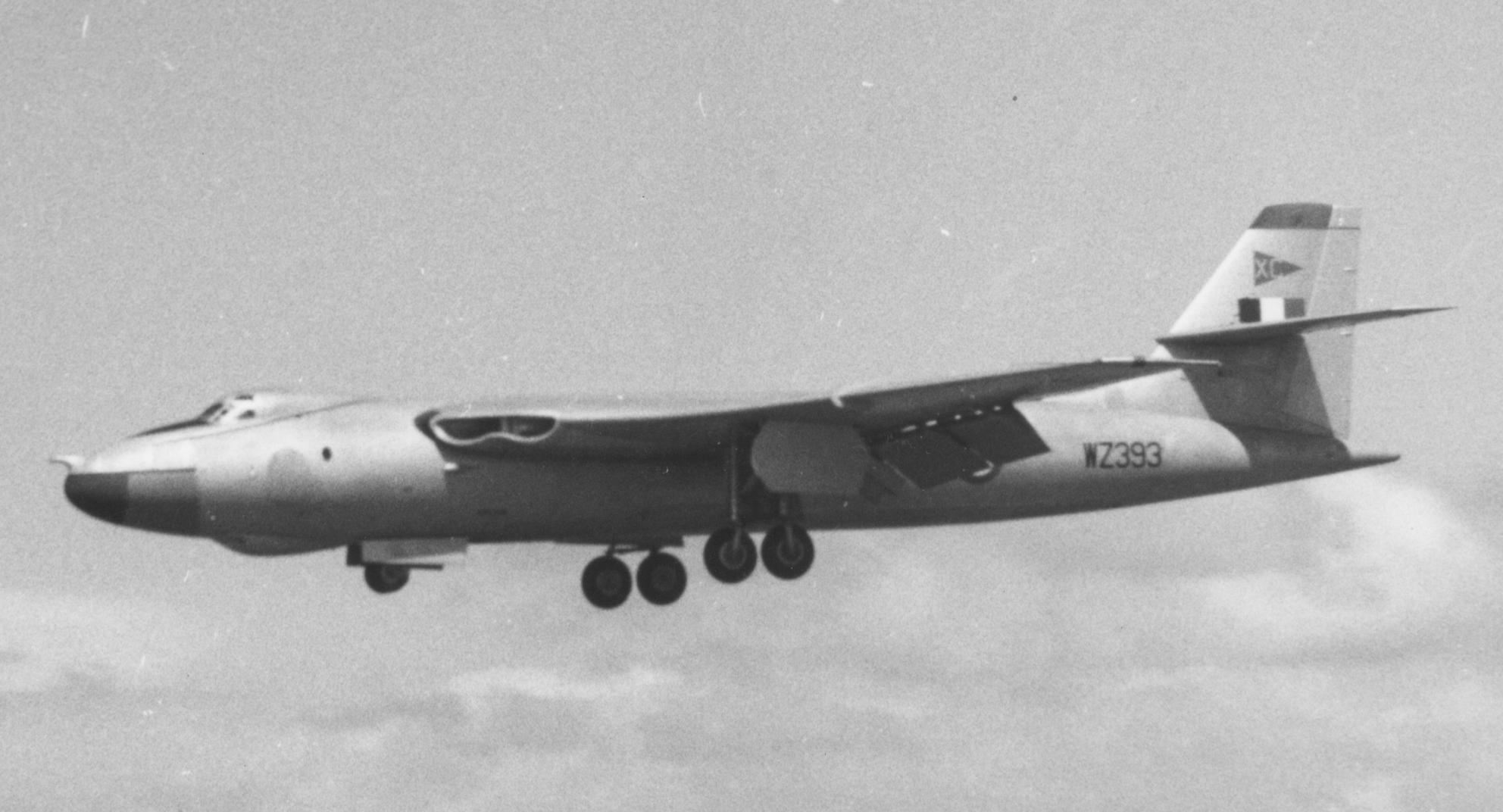
Valiant B(PR)K.1 WZ393 of 90 Squadron in original all-metal finish displaying at Blackpool Squires Gate airport in 1957

In April 1951, an initial production order for 25 Valiant B.1 (Bomber Mark 1) aircraft was placed by the Ministry of Supply on behalf of the RAF. The timing of this order was key to establishing production quickly. Due to shortages of steel and other materials while setting up an assembly line at Brooklands, substantial portions of the production jigs for the Valiant were made from concrete. The first five Valiants produced were completed to a pre-production standard, the first being WP199. On 21 December 1953, the production aircraft conducted its first flight; this had again occurred within the schedule that Edwards had promised.

On 8 February 1955, this first production Valiant was delivered to the RAF. Britain's "V-bomber" force, as it had been nicknamed in October 1952, formally entered operational service on that day. The Victor and Vulcan would soon follow the Valiant into service, for a total of three types of nuclear-armed strategic bombers in RAF service. In September 1957, the final Valiant was delivered. All production aircraft had been delivered on time and below budget.

A total of 108 Valiants were manufactured, including the sole B.2 prototype. In addition to its principal role as part of Britain's nuclear deterrent, the Valiant bomber also dropped high explosive bombs. The bombers were followed into service by a strategic reconnaissance version and a multi-purpose version capable conventional bombing, aerial reconnaissance and aerial refuelling. 18 squadron operated 6 Valiants with electronic countermeasures equipment. Valiants of 90 and 214 squadrons were used for air refuelling through the addition of a Hose Drum Unit (HDU) in the bomb bay, mounted on the same suspension units that were also used for bombs. This meant that for refuelling, the bomb-bay doors had to be opened so that the refuelling hose could be streamed (unlike later tankers where the HDU was flush with the under fuselage rather than inside a bomb bay). Several Valiants were also used for testing and development purposes, such as its use as a flying testbed during trials of the Blue Steel nuclear-armed standoff missile, which was later added to the arsenal of munitions the other V-bombers were equipped with.

Unlike the Vulcan and Victor, the Valiant did not see the production of a more capable mark 2 model. In 1962 the Valiant bomber squadrons were switched to a low-level flight profile in order to avoid enemy Surface-to-Air (SAM) defence systems. In 1964 fatigue was discovered due to the increased air turbulence in low level flying and led to the type's premature retirement. Vic Flintham observed that: "There is a fine irony to the situation, for Vickers had produced the Type 673 B Mk 2 version designed as a fast, low-level pathfinder... The Air Ministry was not interested..." The Valiant was Vickers' last purpose-built military aircraft. It was followed by the Vanguard, a passenger turboprop designed in 1959, and the Vickers VC10, a jet passenger aircraft in 1962, also used as a military transport and tanker by the RAF.

== Design ==
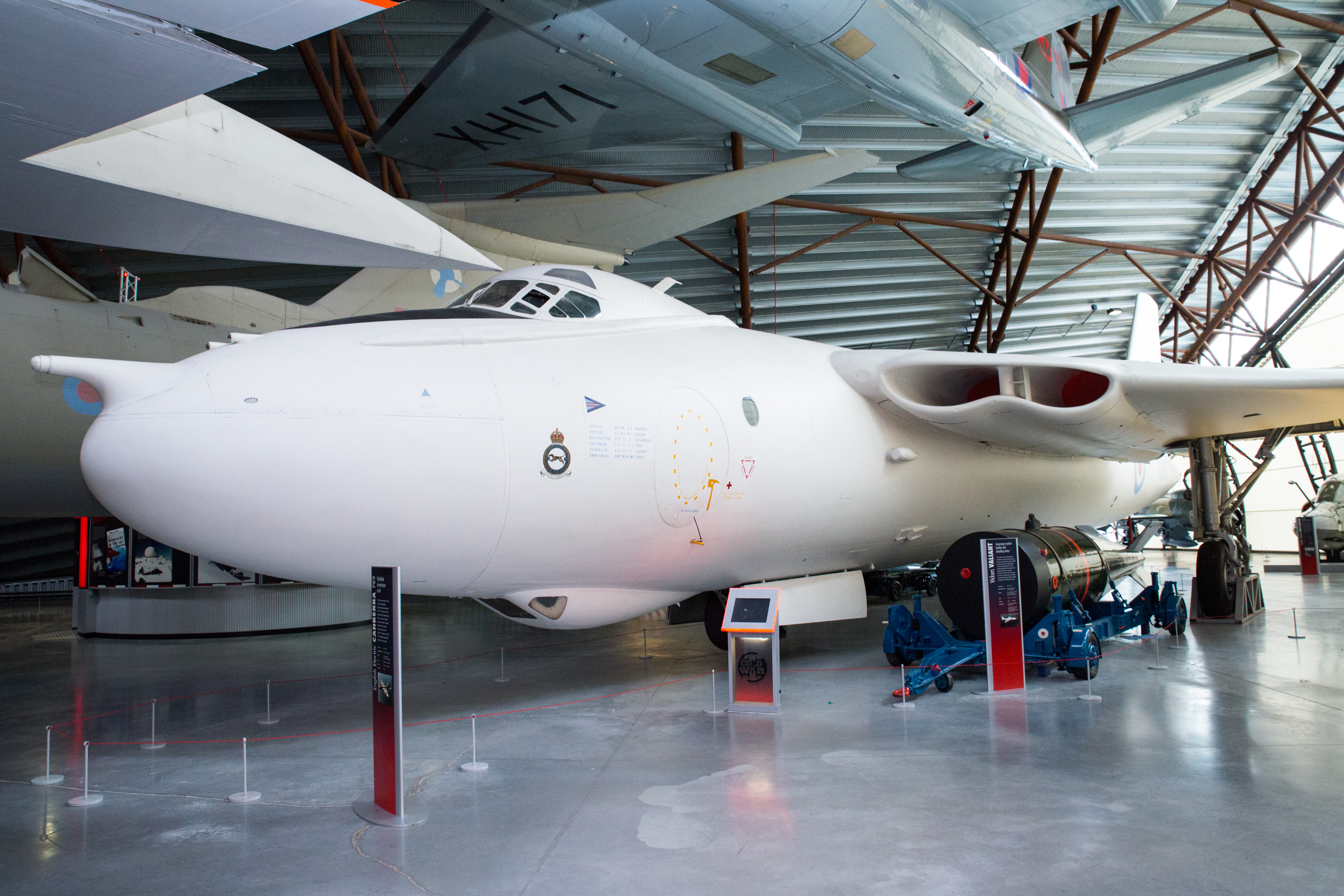
Forward view of preserved Vickers Valiant XD818 at Royal Air Force Museum Midlands

The Valiant was based on contemporary aeronautical knowledge with no advanced untried aerodynamics that required proving with scaled-down research aircraft or lengthy research and development. As a result George Edwards described the Valiant as an "unfunny" aircraft. The Valiant had a shoulder-mounted wing and four Rolls-Royce Avon RA.3 turbojet engines, each providing up to 6,500 pounds-force (29 kN) of thrust, installed in pairs in fireproof bays in each wing root. The design of the Valiant gave an overall impression of a clean aircraft with swept-wing aerodynamics. The root chord thickness ratio of 12% allowed the Avon engines to be within the wing rather than on pods as in the contemporary Boeing B-47. This "buried engine" installation contributed to the aircraft's aerodynamic cleanness, and was British practice at the time. It made engine access for maintenance and repair difficult and increased the risk that an uncontained failure of one engine would cause damage to the adjacent engine; it also increased the complexity of the design of the main spar which had to be routed around the engines.

The wing of the Valiant used a "compound sweep" configuration, devised by Vickers aerodynamicist Elfyn Richards. Richards found that it was necessary to increase the sweep on the inboard section of the wing, a discovery which he later patented as "Improvements in Aeroplane Wing Formation" with an explanation that "the formation of the shockwaves be delayed to the same extent over the whole span of the wing"; the Valiant wing had 37° sweepback for the inner third of the wing, and 21° for the remainder. This was because the thickness/chord ratio could be reduced closer to the tips. The choice to have mild sweepback around the aerodynamic control surfaces meant that in-service speeds were limited to Mach 0.84 and a typical cruise of Mach 0.75 at heights up to 55,000 feet (17,000 m) when lightly loaded. A drogue parachute was not necessary even operating from runways as short as 6,000 feet (1,800 m).

The wing was mounted high on the fuselage and the location of the engines and main landing gear within the wing limited the volume available for fuel. The trailing edge of the wing had two-section ailerons with trim tabs, and inboard of the ailerons were double-slotted flaps. Direct electrical drives were used to move the flaps and landing gear. The only hydraulically-operated equipment, the steering and brakes, was also powered by electric motors but driving hydraulic pumps instead of mechanical gearing.

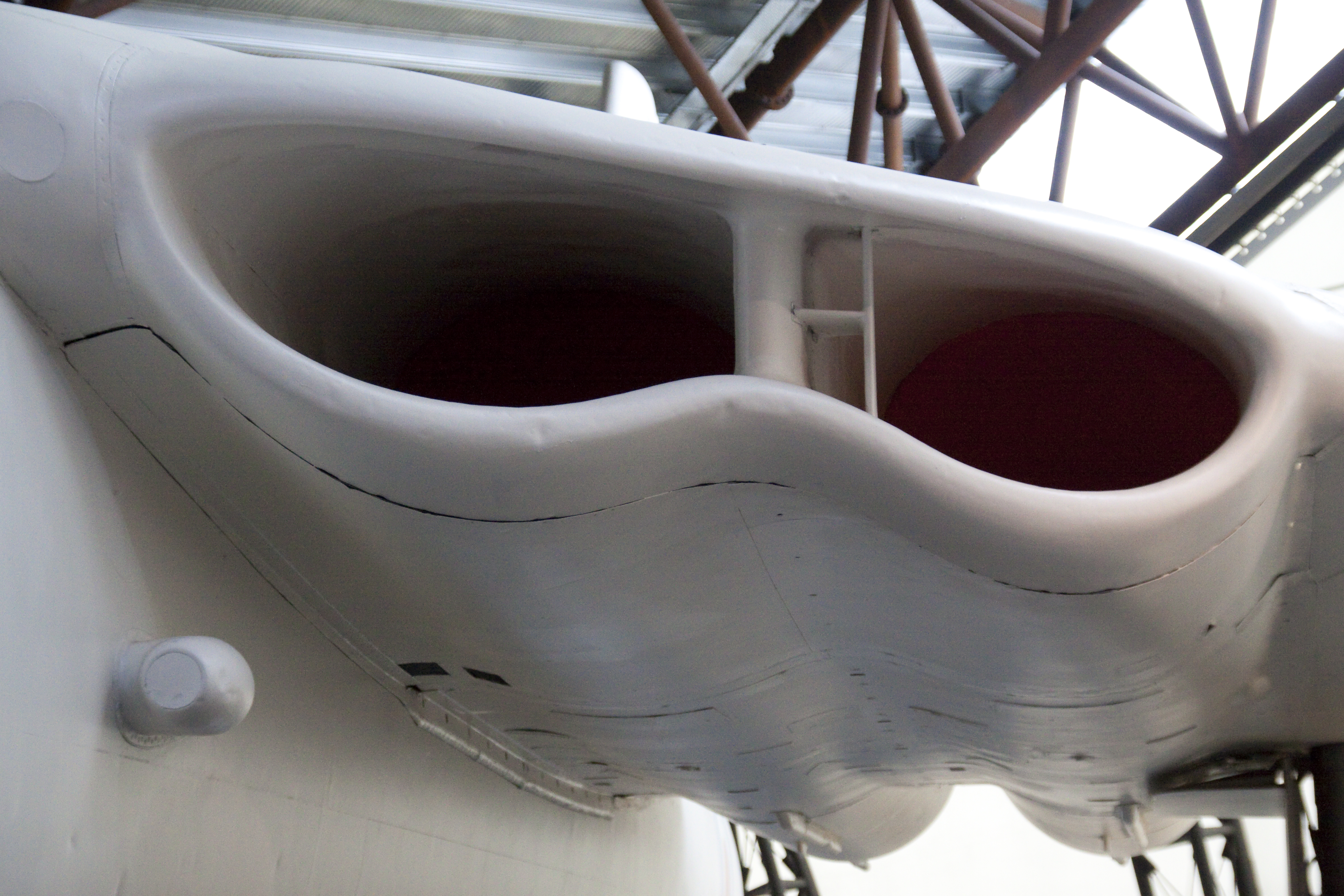
The wing root and air intakes

Production aircraft were powered by four Avon 201 turbojet engines, with 9,500 pounds-force (42 kN) thrust. The engines also provided bleed air for the pressurisation, ice protection, and air conditioning systems. The aircraft's DC electrical generators were also driven by the engines. Napier Spraymat electric heaters were installed in the engine inlets to prevent ice formation and subsequent shedding possibly causing engine damage. The shape of the engine inlets were long rectangular slots in the first prototype, whereas production Valiants had oval or "spectacle" shaped inlets designed to pass greater airflow for the more powerful engines that were installed. The jet exhausts emerged from fairings above the trailing edge of the wings.

For required takeoff performance from short tropical dispersal bases, a jettisonable rocket booster engines pack was developed for the Valiant. Trials were performed with two underwing de Havilland Sprite boosters; they were no longer needed when more powerful variants of the Avon engine became available. Also, there was an increased risk of accidents if one booster rocket failed on takeoff, resulting in asymmetric thrust. Some Valiant engines had water injection, which increased takeoff thrust by about 1,000 pounds-force (4.4 kN) per engine.

The crew were in a pressurised compartment in the forward fuselage and consisted of a pilot, co-pilot, two navigators, and air signaller (later called an air electronics officer (AEO)). Manufacture of this pressurised section was subcontracted to Saunders-Roe. The pilot and co-pilot were located side by side on an upper level, the remaining three crew members sat at stations lower in the cockpit, and faced to the rear. The crew was reduced to five with the deleted requirement for defensive gun turrets and air gunners, an operational philosophy proved by the De Havilland Mosquito bomber of World War II. (Note: Vickers had proposed the installation of a pair of 20 mm cannon in the tailcone; this concept was never taken beyond the drawing stage.) The pilot and copilot were provided with Martin-Baker Mk.3 ejector seats, while the rear crew had to bail out of the oval main entrance door on the port side of the fuselage. Safe escape using this exit was not considered likely.

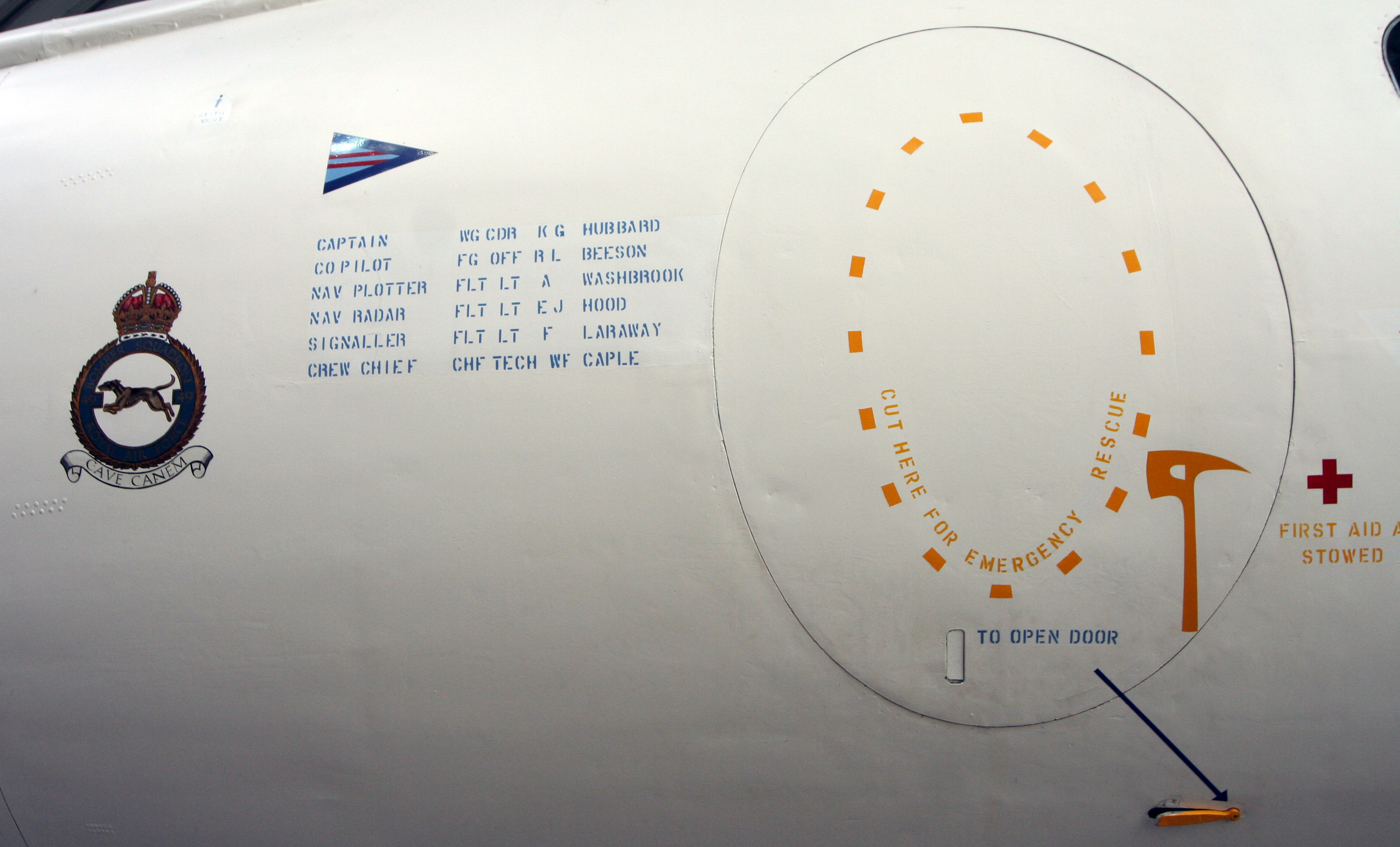
The entry door on the side of the forward fuselage, with the names of pilot Kenneth Hubbard and his crew

The fuselage area behind the pressurised crew section and forward of the wing was used to house much of the avionics, and air conditioning equipment, and was sometimes called the "organ loft". The Valiant had twin-wheel nosegear and tandem-wheel main gear that retracted outwards into recesses in the underside of the wing. Each of the main gears were equipped with multipad anti-skid disc brakes, and were telescopically linked so that a single drive motor could pull them up into the wing recesses. Most of the aircraft systems were electric, including the flaps and undercarriage. The brakes and steering gear were electrically powered, driving hydraulic pumps for actuation. The lower half of the aircraft nose contained the scanner for the H2S radar in a glass fibre radome; in addition, a visual bomb sight was located beneath the lower floor of the pressurised cockpit. The avionics bay was not accessible from the cockpit but could be accessed using an entrance at the base of the rear fuselage leading to an internal catwalk above the aft part of the bomb bay.

The electrical systems used 112 volt direct current generators, one on each engine, for functions requiring large amounts of electrical power. A 28 V DC system was used for other uses including actuators that controlled the higher-voltage system functions. Backup power came from 24 V and 96 V batteries. 115 V alternating current was provided for the radar and the actuators for the flight surfaces, flaps, air brakes and undercarriage. It was decided during the design phase that as much of the aircraft would be electrically driven as was possible; the complete electrical system including high voltage generators and cabling, together with electric motors with mechanical drives, was lighter than the hydraulic equivalent consisting of pumps, tubing, actuators, fluid and storage tanks.

The flight controls of the Valiant (ailerons, elevator and rudder) consisted of two channels of power control with full manual backup; flying in manual was practised during training as it would be required if a complete electrical failure occurred during a flight. In "manual" the flight controls required considerable physical effort to operate. The pilot's controls for elevators, ailerons and rudder had an artificial feel system, the pressure for which was provided from a ram-air inlet.

A Smith Aerospace autopilot and instrument landing system (ILS) was installed along with various navigational aids, such as the Marconi Company-built Green Satin doppler radar, Gee radio navigation, Automatic Direction Finder (ADF), VOR/Distance Measuring Equipment (DME), and radar altimeters. Provisions for additional equipment and sensors, such as side looking airborne radar, were also made.

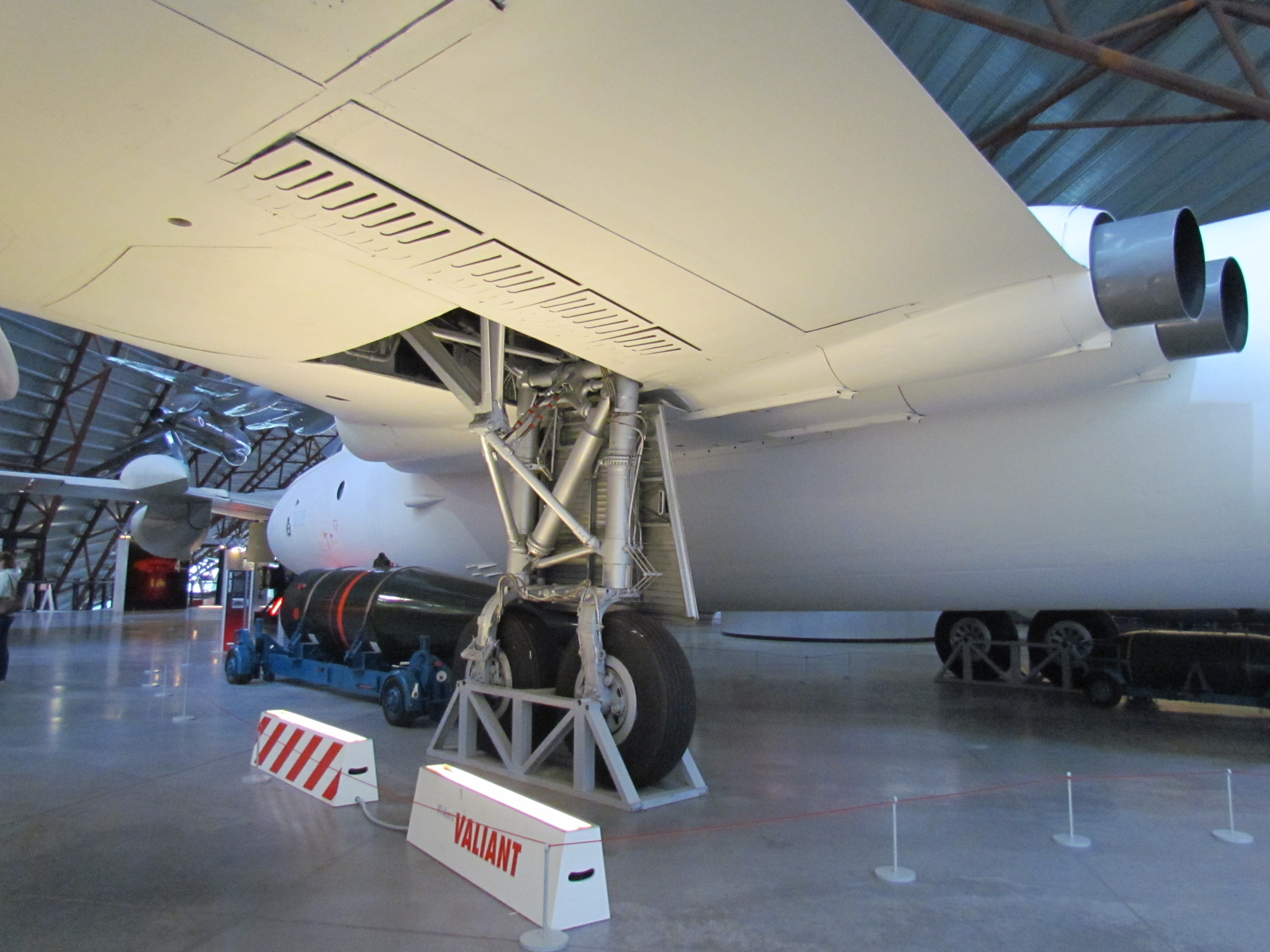
Landing gear and wing

The centre fuselage of the Valiant had a main backbone beam to support the weight of the two widely-set wing spars and five fuel cells in the upper fuselage. The bomb bay was also in the lower half of the centre fuselage. The aft fuselage used a semi-monocoque structure, being lighter than the centre fuselage; the Boulton-Paul-produced electro-hydraulic power units for the ailerons, elevators, and rudder were contained within this space. The tail, which was attached to the rear fuselage was tapered rather than swept back, the horizontal tailplane was mounted well up the vertical fin to keep it clear of the engines' exhaust. The tailcone contained an ARI 5800 Orange Putter tail warning radar.

The main structural components, spars and beams of the Valiant had been constructed from a quaternary zinc/magnesium/copper/chromium aluminium alloy called D.T.D. 683 in the UK. The Valiant had been designed with a 'Safe-Life' strategy; this combination of 'Safe-Life' and D.T.D. 683 came to be viewed as a severe mistake. In 1956, a paper published in the Journal of the Institute of Metals condemned the alloy D.T.D. 683 as being unstable and capable of catastrophic failure when stressing the airframe close to its design limits. The "Safe-Life" design strategy was dismissed by the Chief Structures Engineer of Lockheed at in a talk given to the Royal Aeronautical Society in 1956, because it did not guarantee safety from catastrophic failure.

The Valiant B.1 could carry a 10,000-pound (4,500 kg) nuclear weapon or up to 21 1,000 lb (450 kg) conventional bombs in its bomb bay. It was designed for the early fission-based nuclear weapons and also the newer and larger thermonuclear hydrogen bombs. A "clean" Valiant (one without underwing tanks) could climb straight to 50,000 ft after takeoff unless it had heavy stores in the large bomb bay.

In the aerial reconnaissance role, a camera crate would be installed in the bomb bay, along with a pair of cameras set into the fuselage and larger rear fuel tanks to extend the aircraft's endurance. Large external fuel tanks under each wing with a capacity of 1,650 imperial gallons (7,500 L; 1,980 US gal), could be used to extend range; an auxiliary fuel tank could also be installed in the forward area of the bomb bay; the external wing tanks were fitted as standard on Valiants that were operated as aerial refuelling tankers. For receiving fuel, a fixed refuelling probe was fitted onto the aircraft's nose, this was connected to the fuel tanks via a pipe running along the outside of the canopy to avoid penetrating the pressure cabin.

== Operational history ==
=== Nuclear deterrent ===
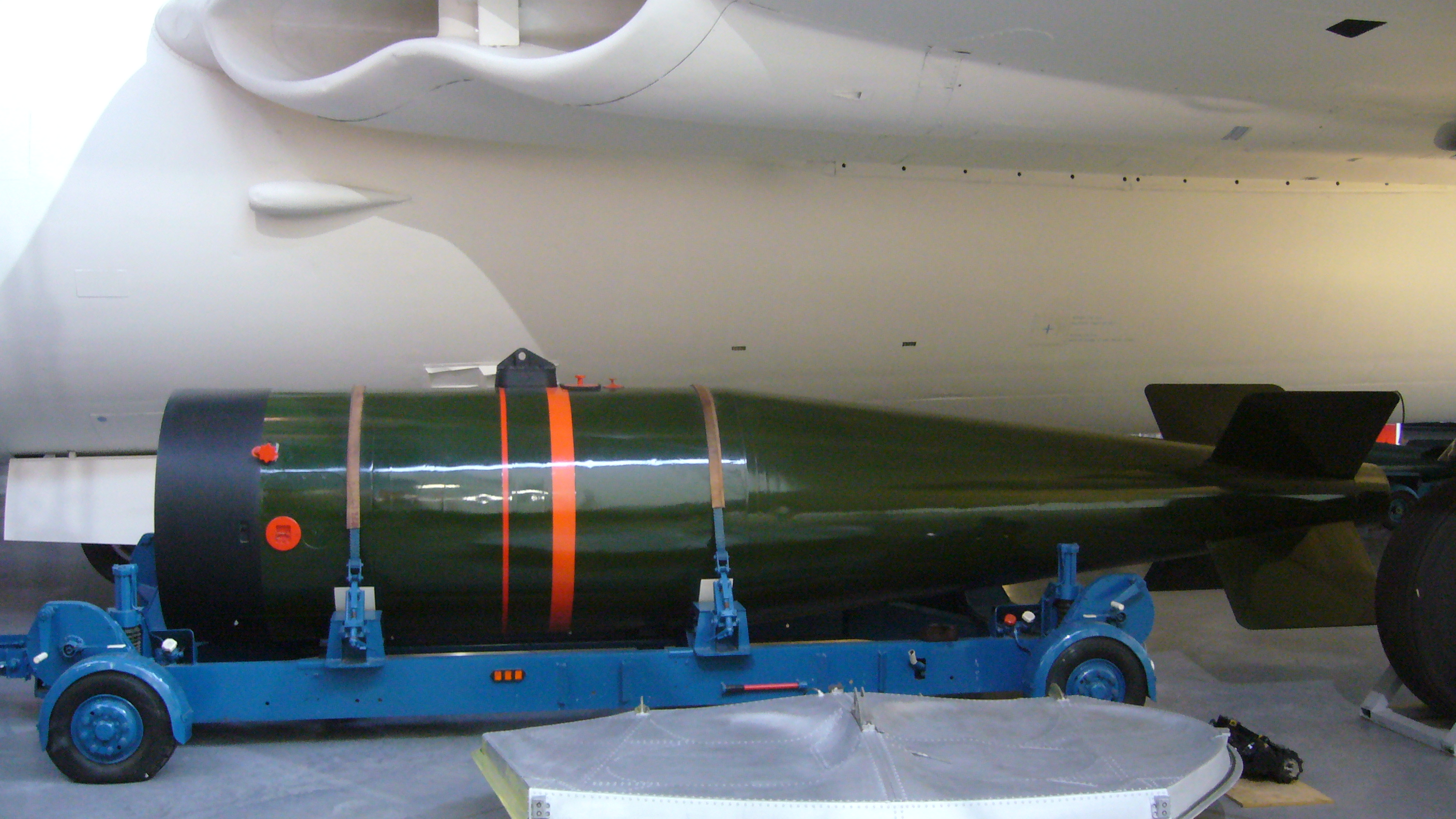
Side view of a Yellow Sun nuclear bomb under the wing of Vickers Valiant XD818 at the RAF Cosford museum

The first squadron to be equipped with the Valiant was 138 Squadron, which formed at RAF Gaydon on 1 January 1955, with 232 Operational Conversion Unit forming at Gaydon on 21 February 1955 to convert crews to the new bomber. Since the Valiant was part of an entirely new class of bombers for the RAF, the crews for the new type were selected from experienced aircrew, with first pilots requiring 1,750 flying hours as an aircraft captain, with at least one tour flying the Canberra, with second pilots needing 700 hours in command and the remaining three crewmembers had to be recommended for posting to the Valiant by their commanding officers. Valiants were originally assigned to the strategic nuclear bombing role, as were the Vulcan and Victor B.1s when they became operational. At its peak, the Valiant equipped ten RAF squadrons.

According to Gunston and Gilchrist, the Valiant had performed "extremely well" during the annual bombing competition hosted by American Strategic Air Command (SAC). American interest in the Valiant resulted in a visit to Vickers by USAF generals Vandenberg, Johnson and LeMay. Vickers test-pilot Brian Trubshaw believed that George Edwards was put under some pressure to build the Boeing B-47 under licence. The only result from the visit was Le May's insistence that the Valiant pilot side-by-side seating be incorporated in the B-52 instead of the tandem arrangement in the B-47 and prototype B-52.

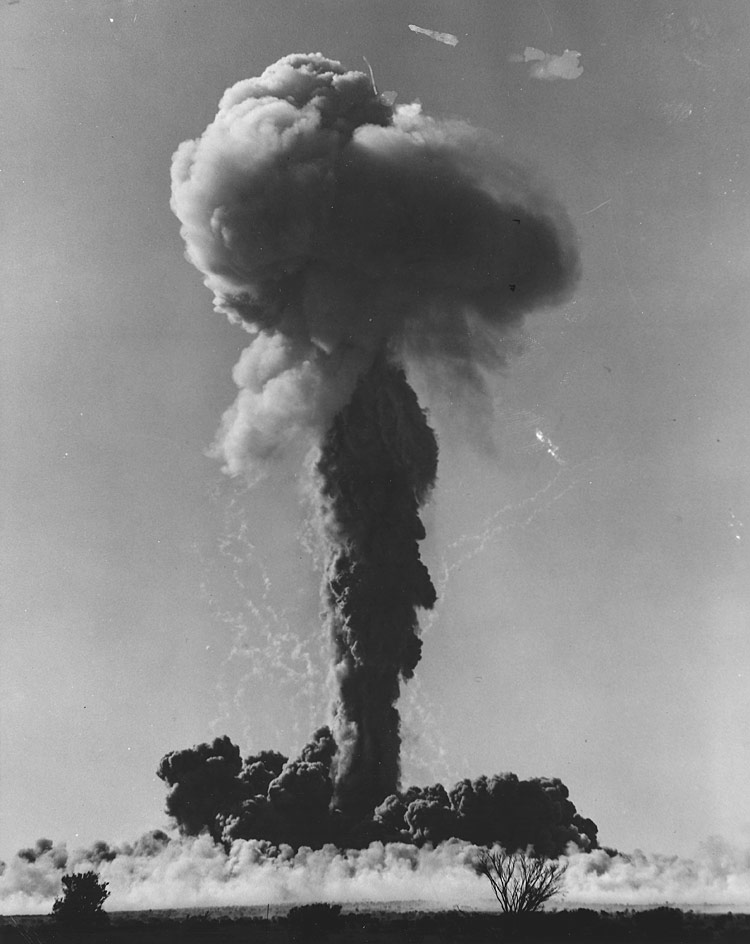
On 11 October 1956, Valiant B.1 WZ366 of No. 49 Squadron became the first British aircraft to drop a live atomic bomb during the Buffalo R3/Kite test

All eight British nuclear weapons that were ever detonated after being dropped from an aircraft were dropped by Vickers Valiants of No. 49 Squadron RAF.

On 11 October 1956, a Valiant B.1 (WZ366) piloted by Edwin Flavell was the first British aircraft to drop an atomic bomb when it performed a test drop of a down-rated Blue Danube weapon on Maralinga, South Australia. This occurred as part of the Operation Buffalo nuclear tests in that area. Windscreen blinds were fitted in advance of the test to protect the crew from the intense flash of light from the nuclear detonation. Following the landing of the aircraft after deploying the weapon, WZ366 was assessed for potential damage and for radioactive contamination.

On 15 May 1957, a Valiant B(K).1 (XD818) piloted by Kenneth Hubbard dropped the first British hydrogen bomb, the Short Granite, over the Pacific as part of Operation Grapple. No 49 Squadron was selected to perform the live weapon drop, and were equipped with specially-modified Valiants to conform with the scientific requirements of the tests and other precautionary measures to protect against heat and radiation. However, the measured yield was less than a third of the maximum expected although achieving a thermonuclear explosion.

On 8 November 1957 a British hydrogen bomb detonated with its planned yield in the Grapple X test. The Grapple series of tests continued into 1958, and in April 1958 the Grapple Y bomb exploded with ten times the yield of the original "Short Granite". Testing was finally terminated in November 1958, when the British government decided it would perform no more air-delivered nuclear tests.

Originally the bombing role was to have been carried out at high altitude, but following the shooting down in 1960 of the Lockheed U-2 flown by Gary Powers by an early Soviet SA-2 Guideline missile, the SAM threat caused bomber squadrons to train for low-level attack as a means of avoiding radar detection when flying within hostile airspace. They were repainted in grey/green camouflage with normal markings, replacing their anti-flash white scheme. By 1963, four Valiant squadrons (49, 148, 207 and 214) had been assigned to SACEUR in the low-level tactical bombing role. By this point, there had been a noticeable decline in flying rates for the type.

=== Conventional warfare ===
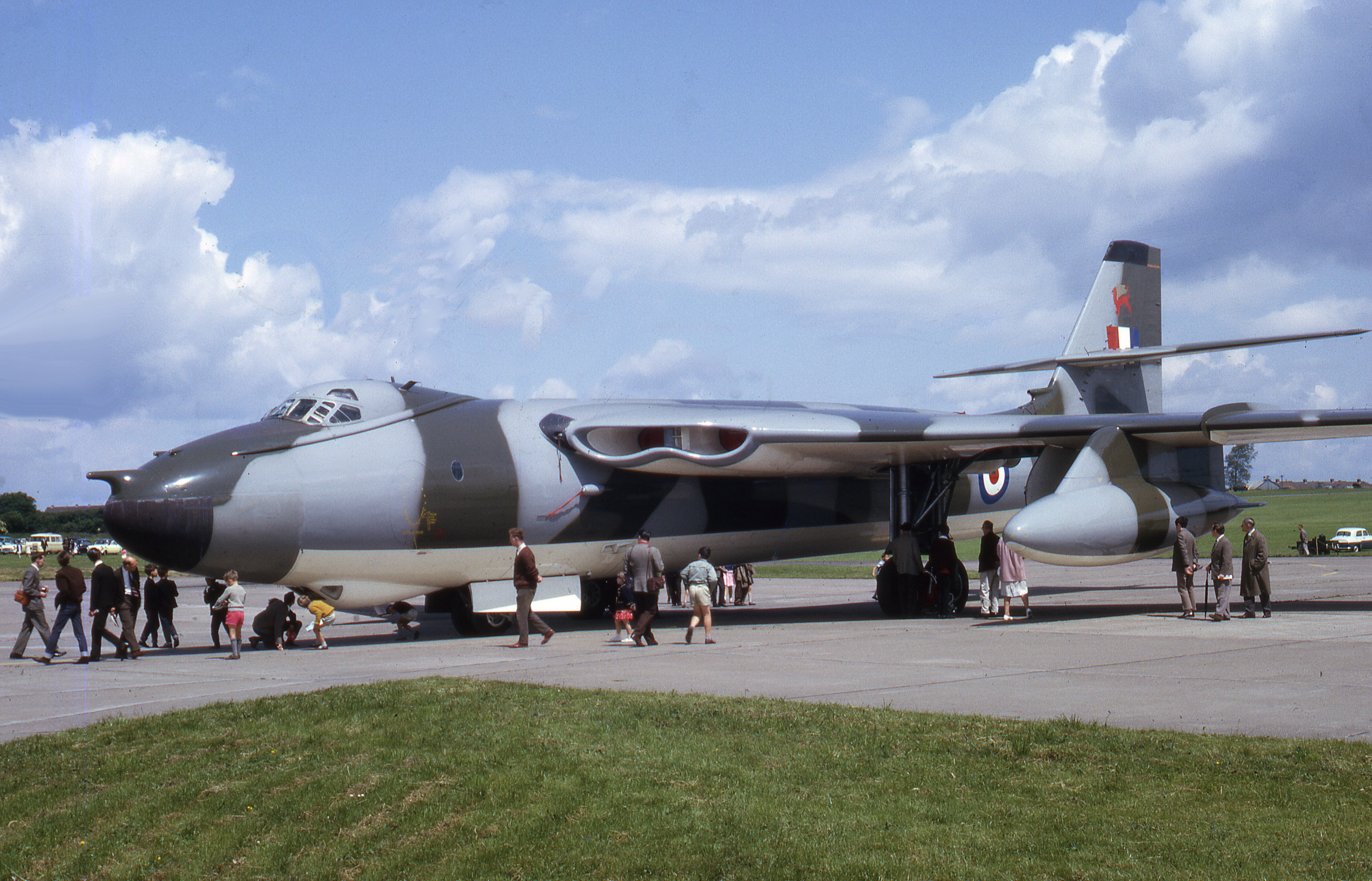
Camouflaged Valiant at Filton, England. Circa mid-1960s

Peacetime practice involved the dropping of small practice bombs on instrumented bombing ranges, and a system of predicted bombing using radio tones to mark the position of the bomb drop over non-range targets, the bomb error being calculated by a ground radar unit and passed either to the crew during flight or to a headquarters for analysis. Use of the Valiant's Navigational and Bombing System (NBS) and the high quality of assigned crews, who were typically veterans and often had been previously decorated for wartime service, meant a high level of bombing accuracy could be achieved, greater than that of aircraft during the Second World War. According to Gunston and Gilchrist, Valiant crews were able to place practice bombs from an altitude of 45,000 feet (14,000 m) within a few meters of their assigned target.

In October and November 1956 the Valiant was the first of the V-bombers to see combat, during the Anglo-French-Israeli Suez campaign. During Operation Musketeer, the British military operation in what became known as the Suez Crisis, Valiants operating from the airfield at Luqa on Malta dropped conventional bombs on targets inside Egypt. Egyptian military airfields were the principal target; other targets included communications such as radio stations and transport hubs. On the first night of the operation, six Valiants were dispatched to bomb Cairo West Air Base (which was aborted in flight due to potential risk to US personnel in the vicinity) while six more attacked Almaza Air Base and a further five bombed Kibrit Air Base and Huckstep Barracks.

Although the Egyptians did not oppose the attacks and there were no Valiant combat losses, the results of the raids were reported as disappointing. Although the Valiants dropped a total of 842 long tons (943 short tons; 856 metric tons) of bombs, only three of the seven airfields attacked were seriously damaged. (Note: The Valiants had not yet been fitted with their operational Navigational and Bombing System (NBS) and were using Second World War bomb-aiming techniques.) The Egyptian Air Force had been effectively destroyed in a wider series of multinational attacks of which the Valiant bombing missions had been a part. It was the last time RAF V-bombers flew a live combat mission until Avro Vulcans bombed Port Stanley airfield in the Falkland Islands during the Falklands War in 1982.

=== Tanker operations ===
Valiant tankers were flown by No. 214 Squadron at RAF Marham, operational in 1958, and No. 90 Squadron at Honington, operational in 1959. The two squadrons became dedicated tanker squadrons on 1 April 1962. Aircraft assigned to the tanker role were fitted with a Hose Drum Unit (HDU or "HooDoo") in the bomb bay. The HDU was mounted on bomb-mounting points and could be removed, so that the aircraft could be reverted to the bomber role if required; this arrangement meant that the bomb bay doors had to be opened in order to transfer fuel to a receiver aircraft. A control panel at the radar navigator station in the cockpit was used to operate the HDU.

Long-range demonstration flights were made with in-flight refuelling by other Valiant tankers that had been positioned at airfields along the route. In 1960, a Valiant bomber flew non-stop from Marham in the UK to Singapore and in 1961 a Vulcan flew non-stop from the UK to Australia. The two tanker squadrons regularly made long range flights. These included non-stop flights from the UK to Nairobi, RAF Gan and Singapore. Other aircraft refuelled by Valiants at this time included Victor and Vulcan bombers, English Electric Lightning fighters, and de Havilland Sea Vixen and Supermarine Scimitar fighters of the Royal Navy.

=== Countermeasures and reconnaissance roles ===
Valiants of No. 18 Squadron RAF at RAF Finningley were modified to the "radio countermeasures" (RCM) role—now called "electronic countermeasures" (ECM). These aircraft were ultimately fitted with American APT-16A and ALT-7 jamming transmitters, Airborne Cigar and Carpet jammers, APR-4 and APR-9 "sniffing" receivers, and chaff dispensers. At least seven Valiants were configured to the RCM role.

Valiants of No. 543 Squadron at RAF Wyton were modified to serve in the photographic reconnaissance role. In one notable operation in 1965, Valiants of No. 543 Squadron photographed around 400,000 square miles (1,000,000 km^{2}) of Rhodesia across an 11-week period.

=== Fatigue failures and retirement ===
In 1956, Vickers had performed a series of low level tests in WZ383 to assess the type for low level flight at high speed. Several modifications to the aircraft were made, including a metal radome, debris guards on the two inboard engines, and after six flights the aileron and elevator artificial feel was reduced by 50%. Pilots reported problems with cabin heating and condensation that would need remedying. The aircraft was fitted with data recording equipment and these data were used by Vickers to estimate the remaining safe life of the type under these flying conditions. Initially a safe life of 75 hours was recommended, which became "the real figure might be less than 200 hours". The number of hours flown by each Valiant in a year was an operational issue for the RAF.

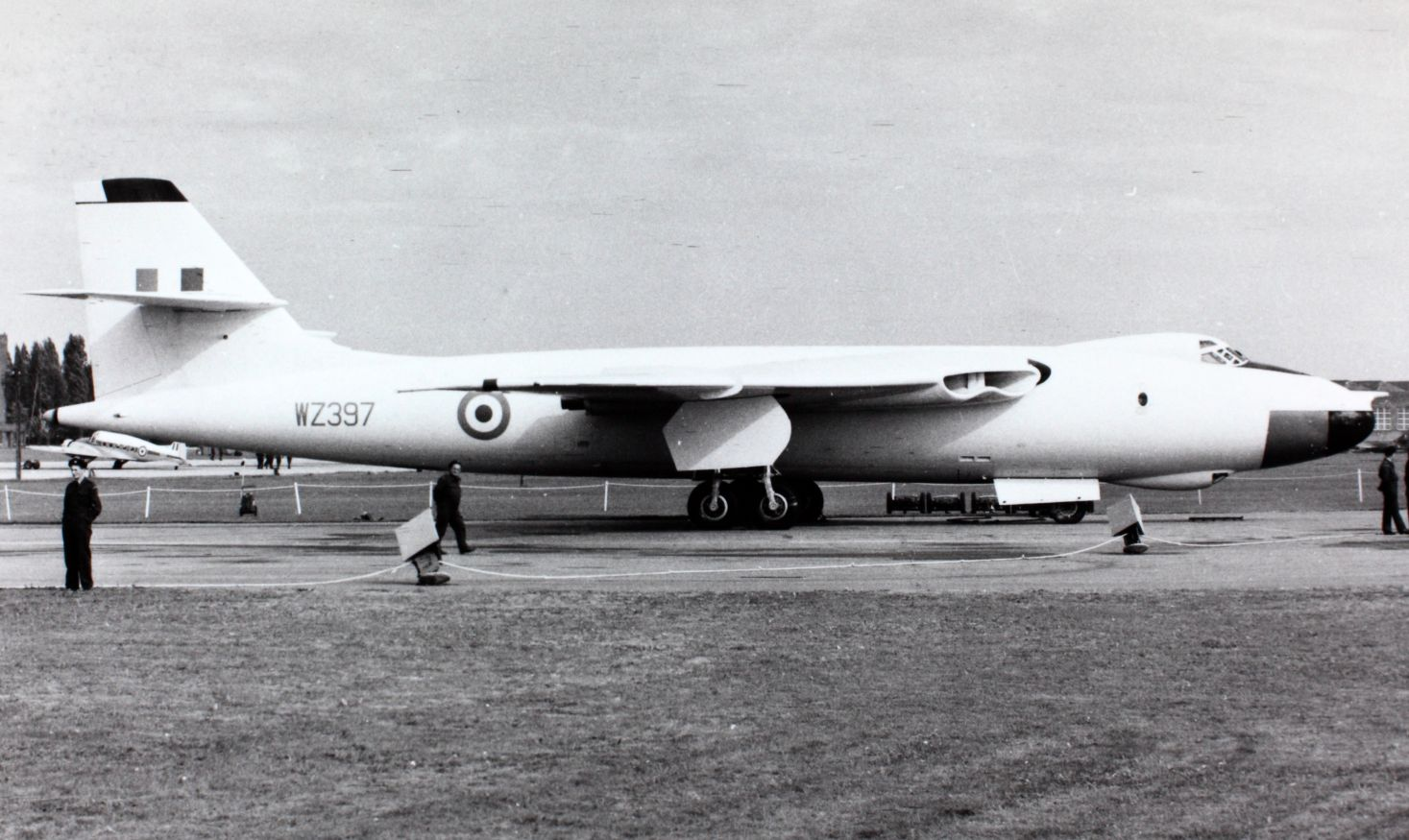
Vickers Valiant on display

Later the RAE ran a similar series of tests that more closely resembled actual operational conditions including low level and taxiing; the corresponding report published in 1958 produced data that could be used to get a better grasp on which flight conditions produced the most damage, and enable a better projection of the future life span for the type.

In May 1957 Flight reported an "incident at Boscombe Down, when the wing rear spar cracked after a rocket-assisted takeoff at overload weight (the reason for the rocket-assistance)" This aircraft was the second prototype WB 215 and had not been modified with the production fix for the known weakness in the rear spar; the aircraft was subsequently broken up for wing fatigue testing after it had flown 489 hours.

After years of front-line service, in July 1964, a cracked spar was found in one of the three Valiants (either WZ394 – Wynne, or WZ389 – Morgan) on Operation Pontifex. This was followed on 6 August by a failure of the starboard wing rear spar at 30,000 ft, in WP217, an OCU aircraft from Gaydon captained by Flight Lieutenant "Taffy" Foreman. The aircraft landed back at Gaydon but without flap deployment because damage to the starboard rear spar caused the flap rollers to come out of their guides so that the flap would not lower on that side. Later inspection of the aircraft also showed the fuselage skin below the starboard inner plane had buckled, popping the rivets; the engine door had cracked and the rivets had been pulled and the skin buckled on the top surface of the mainplane between the two engines. Both of these aircraft were PR variants.

Inspections of the entire fleet showed that the wing spars were suffering from fatigue at between 35% and 75% of the assessed safe fatigue life, probably due to low level turbulence. After this inspection, the aircraft were divided into three categories, Cat A aircraft continuing to fly, Cat B to fly to a repair base, and Cat C requiring repair before flying again. The tanker squadrons had the highest proportion of Cat A aircraft because their role had been mainly at high level. This also caused the methods of assessing fatigue lives to be reviewed. By the time the type was scrapped, only about 50 aircraft were still in service; the rest had been slowly accumulating at various RAF Maintenance Units designated as "Non effective Aircraft".

Initially there was no question of retiring the type, or even a majority of affected aircraft. Repairs were actively taking place at Valiant bases such as Marham using working parties from Vickers plus RAF technicians from the base. In January 1965, the Wilson government with Denis Healey as Secretary of State for Defence decided that the expense of the repairs could not be justified, given the short operational life left to the Valiant, and the fleet was permanently grounded as of 26 January 1965. The QRA alert that had been in place for SACEUR was maintained until the final grounding. When asked to make a statement regarding the Valiant's scrapping in the House of Commons, Denis Healey stated that it "was not in any way connected with low-level flying" and that the "last Government took the decision to continue operating the Valiant force for another four years after its planned fatigue life was complete".

Aviation author Barry Jones commented in his book that: "A question has to be asked. For two years before the demise of the Valiant, Handley Page at Radlett had 100 Hastings go through their shops. They were completely dismantled and rebuilt, having DTD683 components removed and replaced by new alloy sections. What was so special about the Hastings and why was the Valiant not treated similarly? Perhaps we will know one day – but I doubt it." A Flight report about the scrapping states "Fatigue affected all Valiants ... not only those that had been used for some low flying".

On 9 December 1964, the last Valiant tanker sortie in XD812 of 214 Squadron was refuelling Lightning aircraft over the North Sea and was recalled to land back at Marham before the scheduled exercise was completed. On the same day, the last Valiant bomber sortie was carried out by XD818. (Note: XD818 was also the aircraft which had dropped nuclear weapons during Operation Grapple.)

== Variants ==
Including the three prototypes, a total of 107 Valiants were built.

- Valiant B.1: 37 pure bomber variants, including five pre-production Type 600, Type 667 and Type 674s, which were powered by Avon RA.14 engines with the same 9,500 pounds-force (42 kN) thrust each as the earlier Avon 201 and 34 Type 706 full-production aircraft, powered by Avon RA.28, 204 or 205 engines with 10,500 pounds-force (47 kN) thrust each, longer tailpipes and water-methanol injection for takeoff boost power.
- Type 710 Valiant B(PR).1: eleven bomber/photo-reconnaissance aircraft. Edwards and his team had considered use of the Valiant for photo-reconnaissance from the start, and this particular type of aircraft could accommodate a removable "crate" in the bomb-bay, carrying up to eight narrow-view/high resolution cameras and four survey cameras.
- Type 733 Valiant B(PR)K.1: 14 bomber/photo-reconnaissance/tanker aircraft.
- Type 758 Valiant B(K).1: 44 bomber / tanker aircraft. Both tanker variants carried a removable tanker system in the bomb bay, featuring fuel tanks and a hose-and-drogue aerial refuelling system. A further 16 Valiant B(K).1s were ordered, but cancelled.
- Valiant B.2: 1 prototype.
- Vickers also considered an air transport version of the Valiant, with a low-mounted wing, wingspan increased from 114 feet 4 inches (34.85 m) to 140 feet (43 m), fuselage lengthened to 146 feet (45 m), and uprated engines. Work on a prototype, designated the Type 1000, began in early 1953. The prototype was to lead to a military transport version, the Type 1002, and a civilian transport version, the Type 1004 or VC.7. The Type 1000 prototype was almost complete when it, too, was cancelled.

Valiant production ended in August 1957. An order for 17 B.2 models was cancelled.

== Operators ==
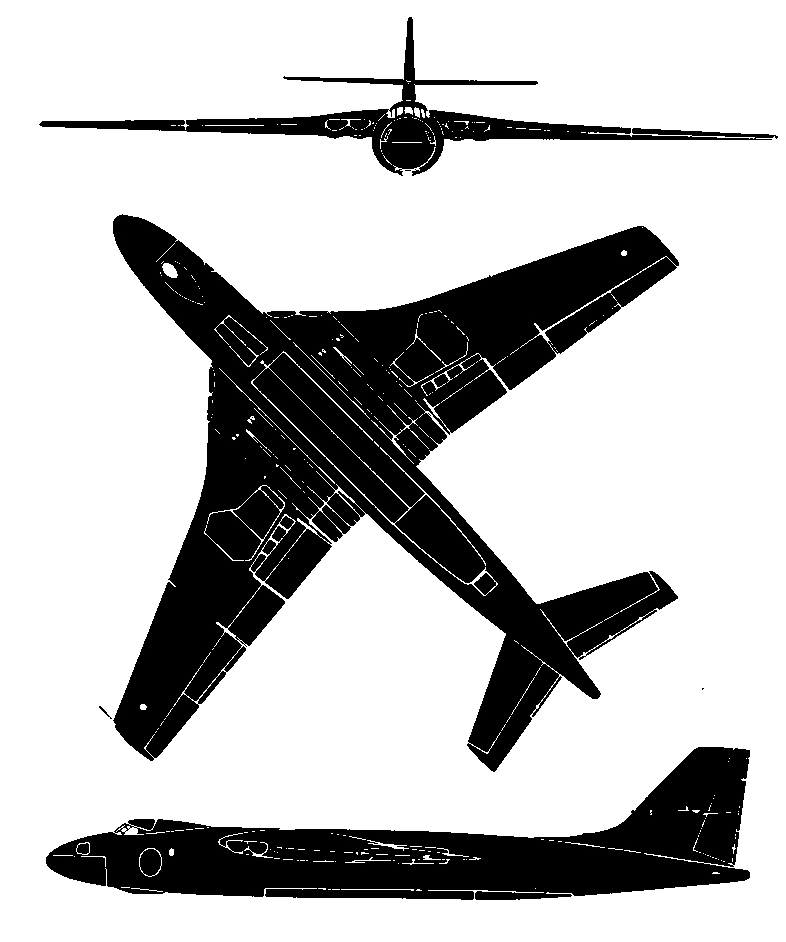
Silhouette of the Valiant B.1

United Kingdom

- Royal Air Force operated Valiants from RAF Gaydon, RAF Finningley, RAF Honington, RAF Marham, RAF Wittering and RAF Wyton by:
  - No. 7 Squadron – Reformed at Honington on 1 November 1956, moving to Wittering on 26 July 1960 and disbanding 30 September 1962.
  - No. 18 Squadron – Valiant equipped C Flight of 199 Squadron renumbered 18 Squadron at Finningley on 17 December 1958 and disbanded 31 March 1963.
  - No. 49 Squadron – Reformed Wittering 1 May 1956, moving to Marham 26 June 1961 and disbanding 1 May 1965.
  - No. 90 Squadron – Reformed at Honington on 1 January 1957 and disbanded on 1 March 1965 .
  - No. 138 Squadron – Reformed at Gaydon on 1 January 1955, moving to Wittering on 6 July 1955 and disbanding 1 April 1962.
  - No. 148 Squadron – Reformed Marham 1 July 1956 and disbanded 1 May 1965.
  - No. 199 Squadron – C Flight of 199 Squadron received Valiants on 29 May 1957 at Honington in the ECM training role, replacing Avro Lincolns, with the rest of the Squadron operating the Canberra. 199 Squadron was disbanded in December 1958, with C Flight becoming 18 Squadron.
  - No. 207 Squadron – Reformed at Marham on 1 April 1956, disbanding on 1 May 1965.
  - No. 214 Squadron – Reformed at Marham on 21 January 1956 and disbanded on 1 March 1965.
  - No. 543 Squadron – Reformed at Gaydon on 1 April 1955 in the strategic reconnaissance role and moved to Wyton on 18 November 1955. It received Victor Mk 1s to replace its grounded Valiants in 1965.
  - No. 232 Operational Conversion Unit RAF – Formed at Gaydon 21 February 1955 to train Valiant flight crews, with Victor training added in 1957. The Valiant equipped B flight disbanded in February 1965.
  - No. 1321 (Valiant/Blue Danube Trials) Flight

== Accidents and incidents ==
- 12 January 1952; the first Valiant prototype WB210 crashed near Bransgore following a midair fire.
- 29 July 1955; Valiant B1 WP222 of No. 138 Squadron crashed on takeoff at RAF Wittering following aileron malfunction, killing all four crew.
- 11 May 1956; Valiant B1 WP202 of the Royal Aircraft Establishment lost control and crashed attempting to land at Southwick Recreation Ground, near Hove in Sussex.
- 13 September 1957: Valiant B(PR)K1 WZ398 of No. 543 Squadron caught fire in a hangar at RAF Wyton, not repaired.
- 11 September 1959: Valiant BK1 XD869 of No. 214 Squadron flew into the ground after a night takeoff from RAF Marham.
- 12 August 1960: Valiant BK1 XD864 of No. 7 Squadron nosewheel failed to retract on takeoff from RAF Wittering, while sorting it out the aircraft stalled and crashed into the ground at RAF Spanhoe disused airfield.
- 11 July 1961: Valiant B1 WP205 of the Aircraft and Armament Experimental Establishment overshot runway and hit control caravan at Boscombe Down.
- 3 November 1961: Valiant B(PR)K1 WZ399 of No. 543 Squadron abandoned takeoff at Offutt AFB, Nebraska, United States, caught fire after overshooting runway onto a railway line.
- 14 March 1961 Valiant B. 1 WP200 at RRFU Pershore, failed to complete takeoff, written off.
- 6 May 1964: Valiant B1 WZ363 of No. 148 Squadron (although a 148 Sqn aircraft, it was on loan to, and crewed by, members of 207 Sqn) dived into the ground at night at Market Rasen, Lincolnshire.
- 23 May 1964: Valiant B(PR)K1 WZ396 of No. 543 Squadron landed on foam with landing gear problems at RAF Manston, not repaired.

== Surviving aircraft ==
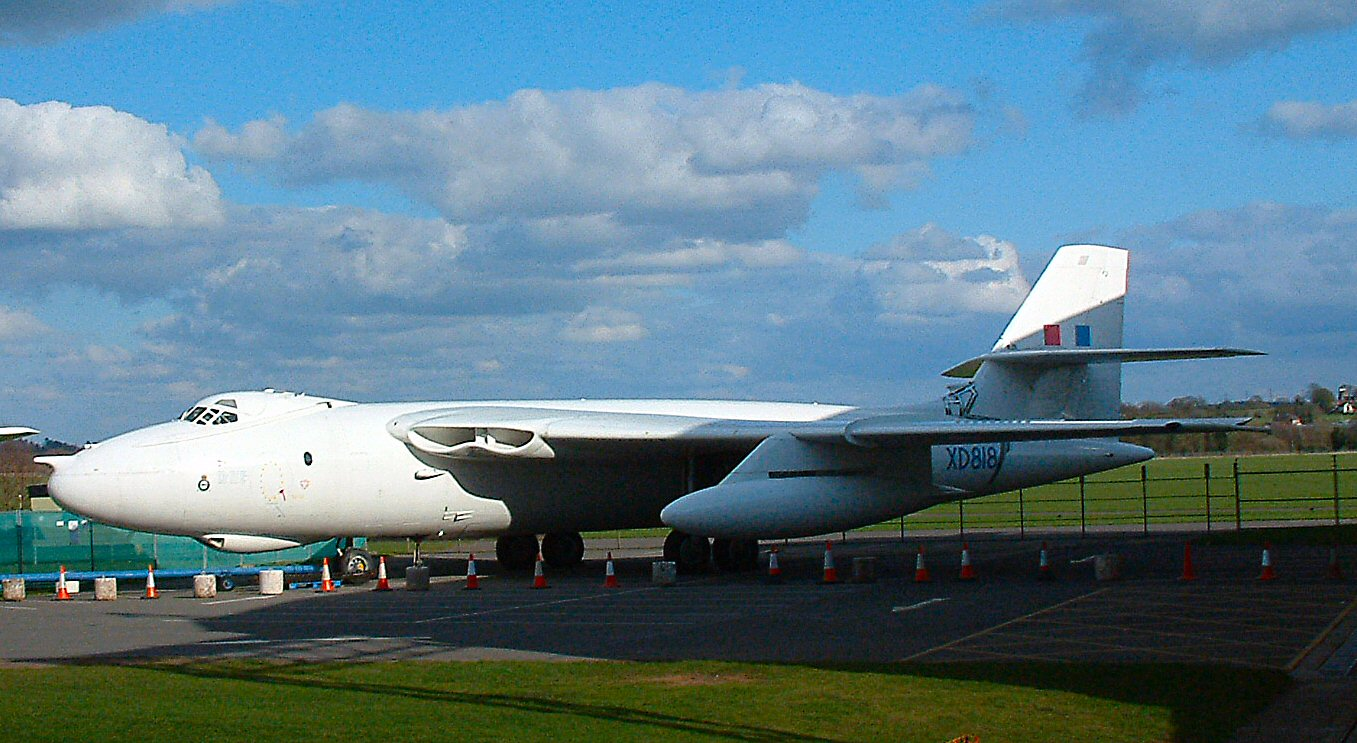
Vickers Valiant B1 XD818, flown by Kenneth Hubbard during Operation Grapple – RAF Museum Cosford in 2006

- Vickers Valiant B1 XD818 – Royal Air Force Museum Midlands at RAF Cosford, on display with the other two V bombers, the Victor and Vulcan in the National Cold War Exhibition. This is the only fully intact example in existence, and so Cosford is the only place where an example of all three V bombers can be seen together.
- Cockpit sections surviving include XD816 at Brooklands Museum in Surrey and XD875 at Morayvia, Kinloss. A third surviving section is the cockpit of XD826 which is part of the Imperial War Museum Duxford in Cambridgeshire, and the flight deck of XD857 is displayed at the Norfolk and Suffolk Aviation Museum at Flixton, Suffolk.

== Specifications (Valiant B.1) ==

Data from Vickers Aircraft since 1908, Jet Bombers

General characteristics

- Crew: five – two pilots, two navigators (one navigator plotter + one navigator radar), air electronics officer
- Length: 108 ft 3 in (32.99 m)
- Wingspan: 114 ft 4 in (34.85 m)
- Height: 32 ft 2 in (9.80 m)
- Wing area: 2,362 sq ft (219.4 m^{2})
- Empty weight: 75,881 lb (34,419 kg)
- Max takeoff weight: 140,000 lb (63,503 kg)
- Powerplant: 4 × Rolls-Royce Avon RA28 Mk 204 turbojets, 10,000 lbf (44 kN) thrust each

Performance

- Maximum speed: 567 mph (912 km/h, 493 kn) at 30,000 ft (9,100 m)
- Range: 4,500 mi (7,200 km, 3,900 nmi) with underwing tanks
- Service ceiling: 54,000 ft (16,000 m)
- Rate of climb: 4,000 ft/min (20 m/s)

Armament

- Bombs: ** 1 × 10,000 lb (4,500 kg) Blue Danube nuclear bomb or
  - 1 × Yellow Sun or
  - 21 × 1,000 lb (450 kg) bombs

== See also ==
Aircraft of comparable role, configuration, and era

- Avro Vulcan
- Boeing B-47 Stratojet
- Handley Page Victor

Related lists

- List of aircraft of the Royal Air Force
- List of V Bomber dispersal bases
