= No. 49 Squadron RAF =

Defunct flying squadron of the Royal Air Force

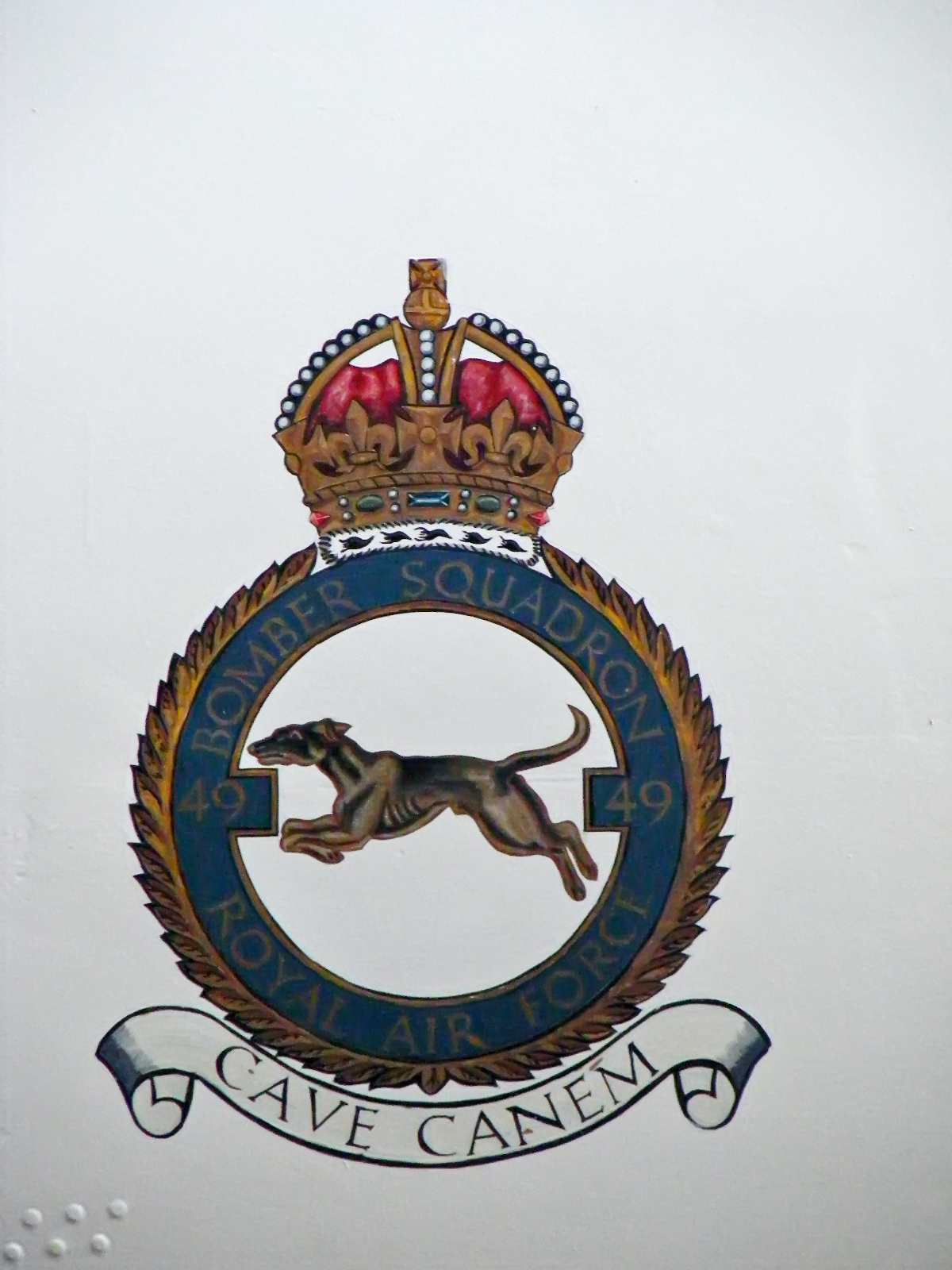
- No. 49 Squadron badge
- Active: 15 Apr 1916 – 18 July 1919, 10 Feb 1936 - 1 Aug 1955; 1 May 1956 – 1 May 1965
- Country: United Kingdom
- Branch: Royal Air Force
- Mottos: Latin: Cave canem ("Beware of the Dog")
- Battle honours: Western Front, 1917-18*: Cambrai, 1917*: Somme, 1918*: Channel & North Sea, 1939-40: France & Low Countries, 1940: Invasion Ports, 1940: German Ports 1940 -45*: Ruhr, 1940 - 45*: Fortress Europe, 1940 -44*: Berlin, 1943-44*: Italy, 1943-44: Biscay Ports, 1943: Normandy, 1944: France & Germany, 1944-45*: Walcheren: Rhine: Honours marked with an asterisk are those emblazoned on the Squadron Standard

Insignia
- Squadron badge heraldry: A greyhound courant. The greyhound is indicative of speed.
- Squadron codes: XU Apr 1939 - Sep 1939; EA Sep 1939 - Apr 1951

No. 49 Squadron was a squadron of the Royal Air Force formed during World War I, re-formed in the build up to World War II, and later took part in the Cold War.

The unit is noted for its role in the British atomic and hydrogen bomb programmes. All eight British nuclear weapons that were ever detonated after being dropped from an aircraft were dropped by Vickers Valiants of No. 49 Squadron. During Operation Buffalo in 1956, a Valiant from the unit became the first British aircraft to drop a live atomic bomb, and a year later, the unit was entrusted with the task of dropping hydrogen bombs in Operation Grapple.

== History ==
The squadron was formed in April 1916 at Swingate Down, near Dover, Kent, flying BE.2c, R.E.7 and DH.4 aircraft. In November 1917, the squadron deployed to France and their first operation was in the Battle of Cambrai. When the First World War ended, 49 Squadron became part of the occupying forces and disbanded in Germany in July 1919.

The squadron was reformed in February 1936 from 'C' flight of No. 18 Squadron at RAF Bircham Newton, flying Hawker Hind aircraft. After relocating to RAF Scampton in 1938, they became the first operational squadron to receive Handley Page Hampden bombers.

=== Second World War ===
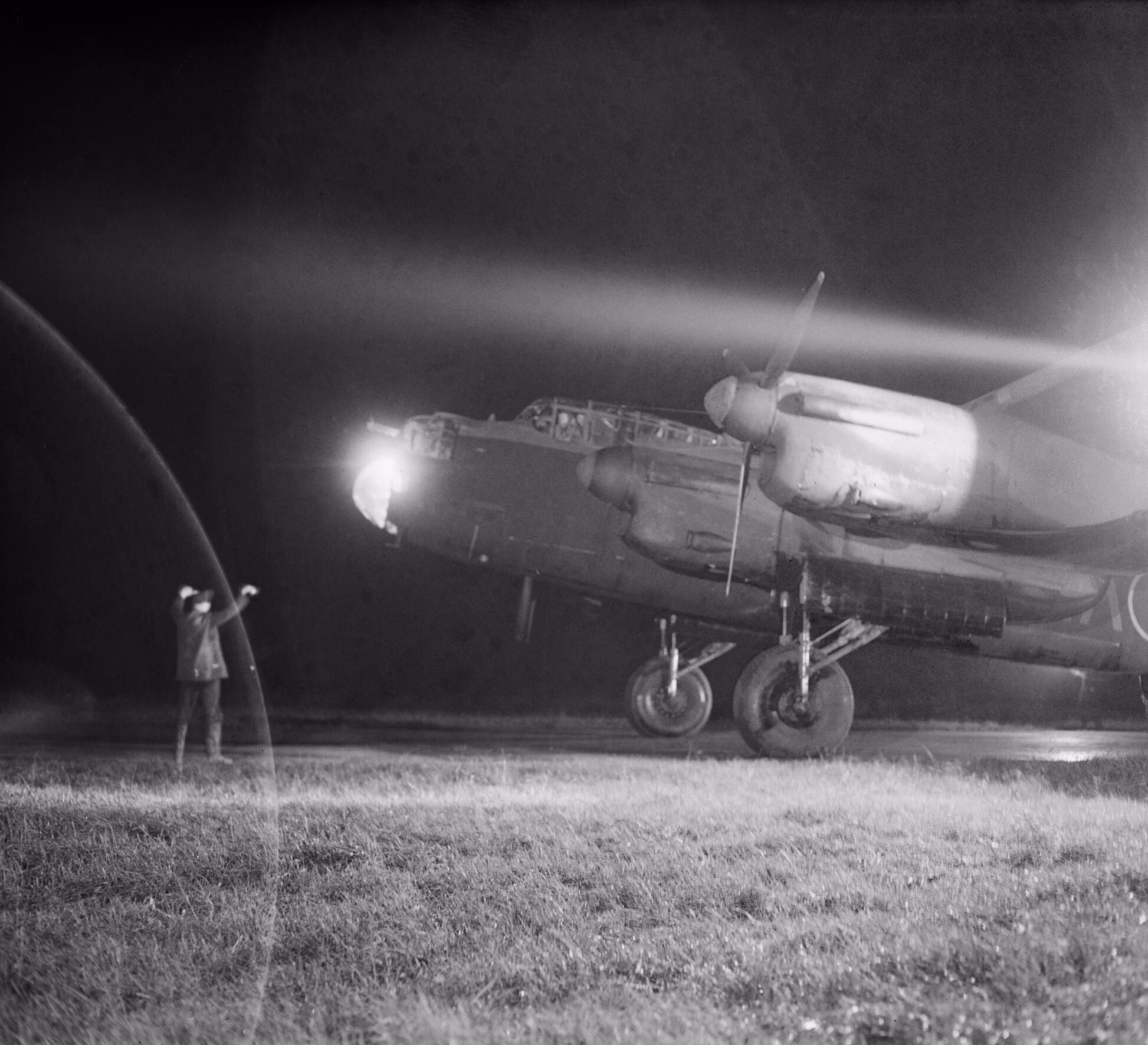
Avro Lancaster D for Donald returns to RAF Fiskerton after bombing Berlin, 22 November 1943. A month later the aircraft and crew were lost returning from Berlin

During the Second World War No. 49 Squadron carried out an attack on the Dortmund-Ems Canal on 12 August 1940. In 1942 they converted to the Avro Manchester, quickly exchanging them for Avro Lancasters when the deficiencies of the Manchester became apparent. In October the squadron took part in Operation Robinson, leading a large force of Lancasters in No.5 Group's daylight attack on the Schneider armament and locomotive works at Le Creusot in France. In 1943 the squadron took part in the first "shuttle-bombing" raid (when the targets were Friedrichshafen and La Spezia), and the Operation Hydra raid on Peenemunde. Among the targets which it attacked during 1944 were the coastal gun battery at La Pernelle on the Normandy coast, and the V-1 flying bomb storage sites in the caves at St. Leu d'Esserent on the River Oise, some 30 miles north-west of Paris.

In December 1944, it took part in a raid on the German Baltic Fleet at Gdynia and in March 1945, was represented in the bomber force which so pulverised the defences of Wesel just before the crossing of the Rhine that Commandos were able to seize the town with only 36 casualties.

=== Mau Mau Uprising ===
No. 49 Squadron remained with Lancasters until it was re-equipped with Lincolns in November 1949. They carried out two tours of duty during the Kenyan Mau Mau Uprising, from November 1953 to January 1954 and from November 1954 to July 1955. During both these tours it was commanded by Squadron Leader Alan E. Newitt DFC. After returning to the UK, the squadron was disbanded at RAF Upwood on 1 August 1955.

==== Loss of Avro Lincoln SX984 ====
During their second tour of operation Avro Lincoln SX984 was lost in an accident on 19 February 1955 while serving in Kenya during the Mau Mau Uprising.

On returning from an operational bombing and strafing sortie at 1540 hours, some 1hr 25mins flying time (total airborne time to the moment of the crash was 1hr 33mins), the pilot of SX984 carried out several unauthorized low passes over the police hut at Githunguri, eight miles north-north-west of Kiambu, where another No. 49 Squadron crew was paying a visit. On the second or third such pass SX984 impacted several obstructions on the ground, variously described as the roof or chimney of the police hut, three village rondavel huts, and possibly a telegraph pole, breaking off part of the wing and some of its nose and tail. The aircraft went into an uncontrolled steep climb, stalled and crashed to the ground about 500 metres south of the police station. Five of the six members of the crew, together with four civilians on the ground, were killed immediately. The sixth member of the crew, the rear gunner, was thrown clear of the wreckage and taken to hospital where he died of his injuries a few hours later.

The finding of the Board of Inquiry was that the accident was caused by wilful disobedience of orders and unauthorized low flying. There is a memorial window to the crew and civilians killed in the crash in St Leonard's Church, Sandridge in Hertfordshire, UK.

=== Nuclear testing ===
All eight British nuclear weapons that were ever detonated after being dropped from an aircraft (see Operation Buffalo and Operation Grapple) were dropped by Vickers Valiants of No. 49 Squadron.

==== Reformation of squadron ====
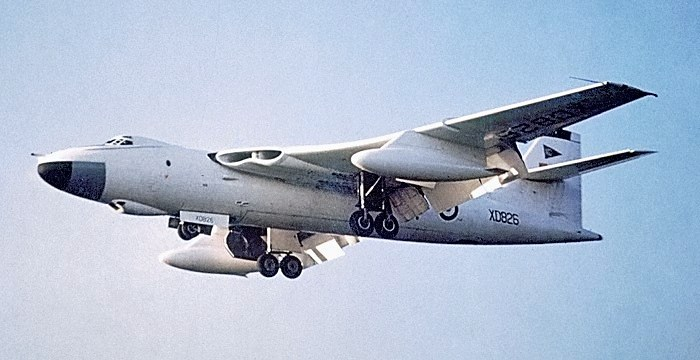
Vickers Valiant, in all-white anti-flash scheme, 1961

No. 49 Squadron was re-formed at RAF Wittering on 1 May 1956, with personnel of 'C' Flight No 138 Squadron forming its nucleus, augmented with additional crews from No 214 Squadron and No 232 OCU. The squadron was equipped with the first of the V-bombers, the Vickers Valiant, and was soon taking centre-stage in Britain's Atomic Bomb program.

==== Operation Buffalo ====
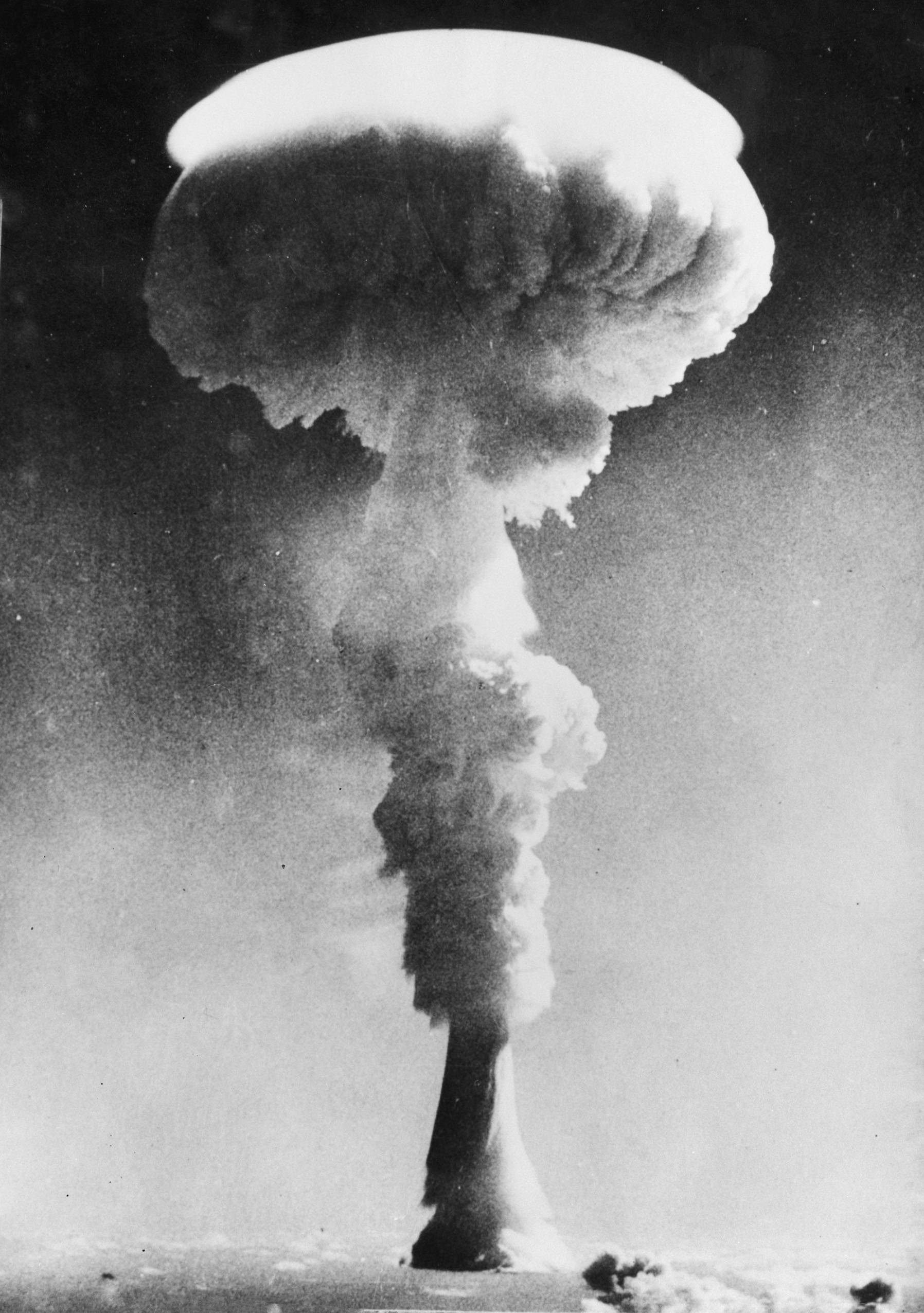
A mushroom cloud rising over Malden Island after the first British hydrogen bomb test on 15 May 1957

During Operation Buffalo in autumn 1956, No. 49 Squadron participated in the British nuclear tests at Maralinga. During the Buffalo R3/Kite test on 11 October 1956, Valiant B.1 WZ366 of No. 49 Squadron became the first RAF aircraft to drop a live atomic bomb. It fell about 91 metres (100 yd) left and 55 metres (60 yd) short of the target, detonating at a height of 150 metres (490 ft) at 15:27. The yield was 3 kilotons of TNT (13 TJ). The pilot, Squadron Leader Edwin Flavell, and the bomb aimer, Flight Lieutenant Eric Stacey, were awarded the Air Force Cross. Fallout was minimal. Two clouds formed, a low-level one at about 2,100 metres (7,000 ft) that dropped all its radioactive material inside the prohibited area, and a high-level one at 3,700 metres (12,000 ft) that deposited a negligible amount of fallout over South Australia, Victoria and New South Wales.

==== Operation Grapple ====
No. 49 Squadron also dropped seven of the nine nuclear bombs used in Operation Grapple, carried out in 1957 and 1958 at Malden Island and Kiritimati (Christmas Island) in the Pacific Ocean as part of the British hydrogen bomb programme. No. 49 Squadron had eight Valiants, but only four deployed:

- XD818, piloted by Wing Commander Kenneth Hubbard, the squadron commander;
- XD822, piloted by Squadron Leader L. D. (Dave) Roberts;
- XD823, piloted by Squadron Leader Arthur Steele; and
- XD824, piloted by Squadron Leader Barney Millett.

The other four Valiants remained at RAF Wittering, where they were used as courier aircraft for bomb components.

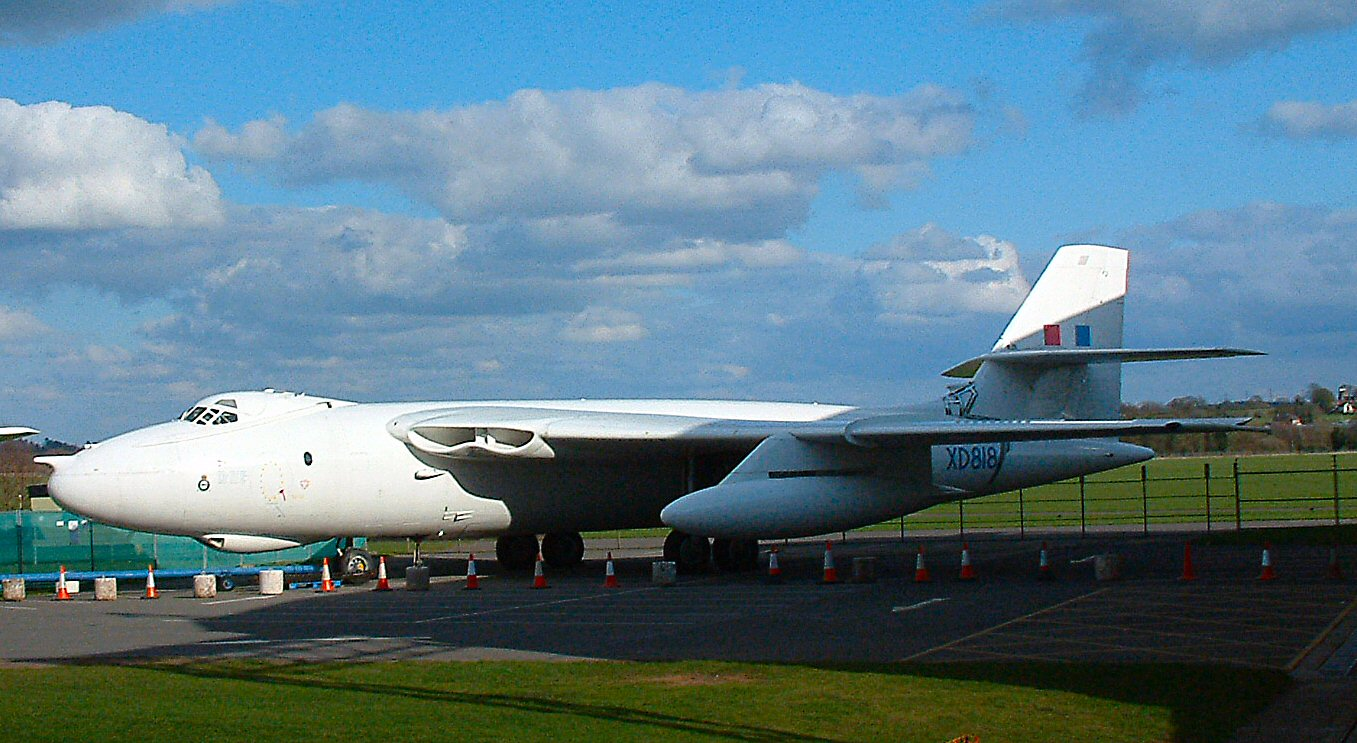
Vickers Valiant B1 XD818 at Royal Air Force Museum Midlands

A full-scale rehearsal for Operation Grapple was held on 11 May, and on 14 May it was decided to conduct the Grapple 1 test the following day.

The Grapple 1 mission was flown by Hubbard in XD818, with Millett and XD824 as the "grandstand" observation aircraft. The two bombers took off from Christmas Island at 09:00. The bomb was dropped from 45,000 feet (14,000 m) off the shore of Malden Island at 10:38 local time on 15 May 1957. Hubbard missed the target by 418 yards (382 m). The bomb's yield was estimated at 300 kilotonnes of TNT (1,300 TJ), far below its designed capability.

=== Disbandment ===
In June 1961 the squadron relocated to RAF Marham, but upon the withdrawal from service of the Valiant, on 1 May 1965 the squadron was disbanded.

== Remaining aircraft ==
The only remaining complete Vickers Valiant (XD818), the one that dropped the first British hydrogen bomb at Christmas Island with No. 49 Squadron as part of Operation Grapple, is preserved at the Royal Air Force Museum Midlands near Wolverhampton.

== Notable personnel ==
- Flt Lt. Roderick Learoyd, VC (later Wing Commander)
- Sqdn Ldr Edwin Flavell
- Wing Cdr Kenneth Hubbard (later Group Captain)

(ranks given at time of service with No. 49 Squadron)
