= Martin-Baker Mk.2 =

British ejection seat

Mk.2
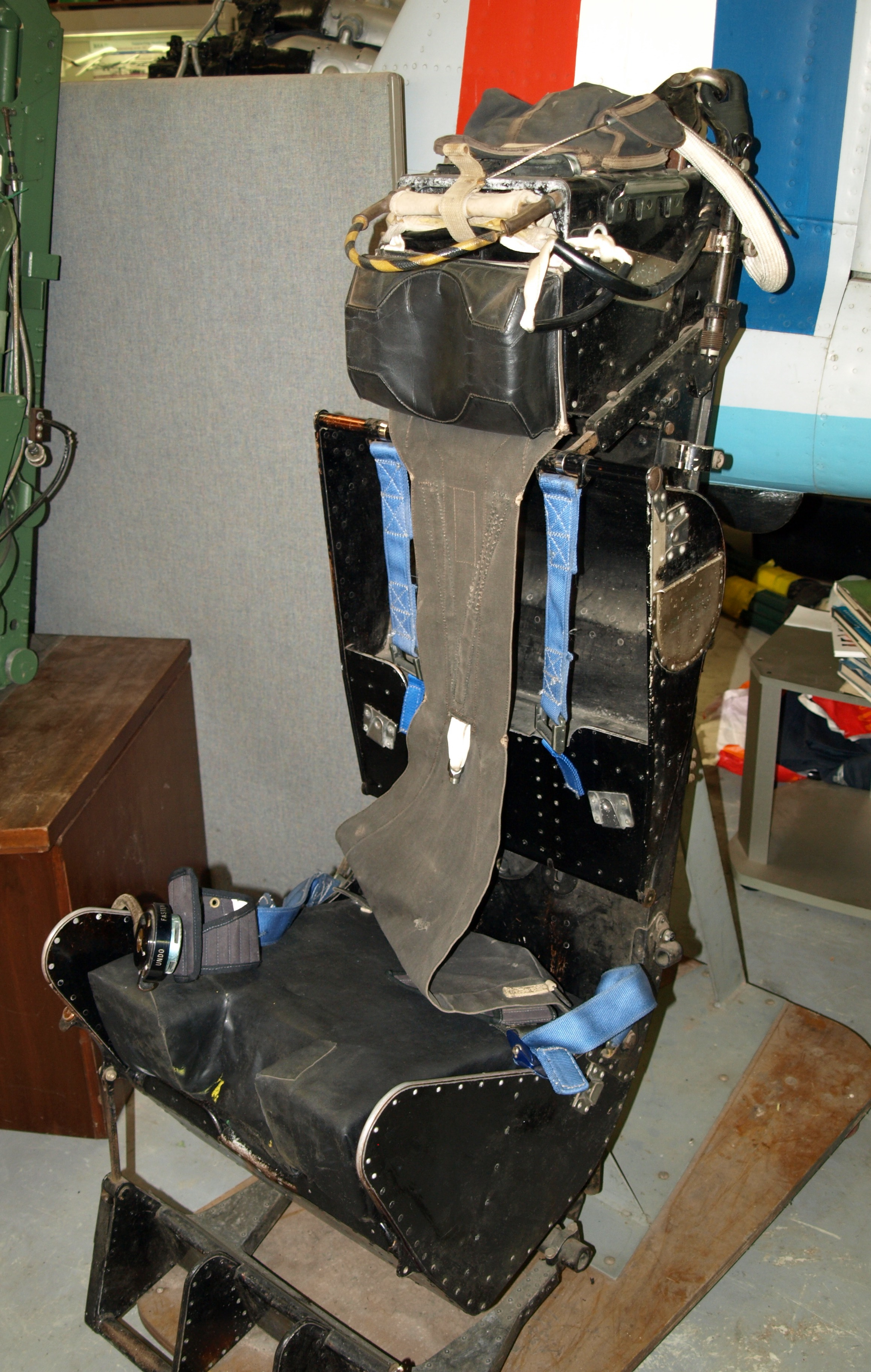
- Martin-Baker Mk.2 on display at the Midland Air Museum

The Martin-Baker Mk.2 is a British ejection seat designed and built by Martin-Baker. Introduced in the early 1950s, the Mk.2 was developed from the Martin-Baker Mk.1, the main improvement being automatic seat separation and parachute deployment.

A development of the seat with a longer-stroke ejection gun, duplex drogue and leg restraints was the Martin-Baker Mk.3.

== History ==
The Mk.2 seat was designed as an improved version of the first Martin-Baker seat. Improvements included relocation of the main parachute and dinghy, automatic parachute deployment and man/seat separation systems to assist incapacitated crews . During 1953 Mk.1 seats in service were modified to Mk.2 standard. The first successful ejection using a Mk.2 seat took place on 15 May 1953, the aircraft involved being a Supermarine Attacker operating from HMS Eagle.

== Operation sequence ==
Operating the face blind firing handle initiates firing of the main gun located at the rear of the seat, the main gun is a telescopic tube with two explosive charges that fire in sequence. As the seat moves up its guide rails an emergency oxygen supply is activated and personal equipment tubing and communication leads are automatically disconnected.

A steel rod, known as the drogue gun, is fired and extracts two small drogue parachutes to stabilise the seat's descent path. A barostatic mechanism prevents the main parachute from opening above an altitude of 10,000 ft (3,000 m) A time delay mechanism operates the main parachute below this altitude, the seat then separates from the occupant for a normal parachute descent, a manual separation handle and ripcord is provided should the automatic system fail.

== Applications ==
The Mk.2 ejection seat has been installed in the following aircraft types:
List from Martin-Baker.

- Avro Canada CF-100 Canuck
- de Havilland Venom
- English Electric Canberra
- Gloster Meteor
- Hawker Hunter
- Hawker Sea Hawk
- Supermarine Attacker
- Supermarine Swift
- Westland Wyvern

=== Mk.3 ===
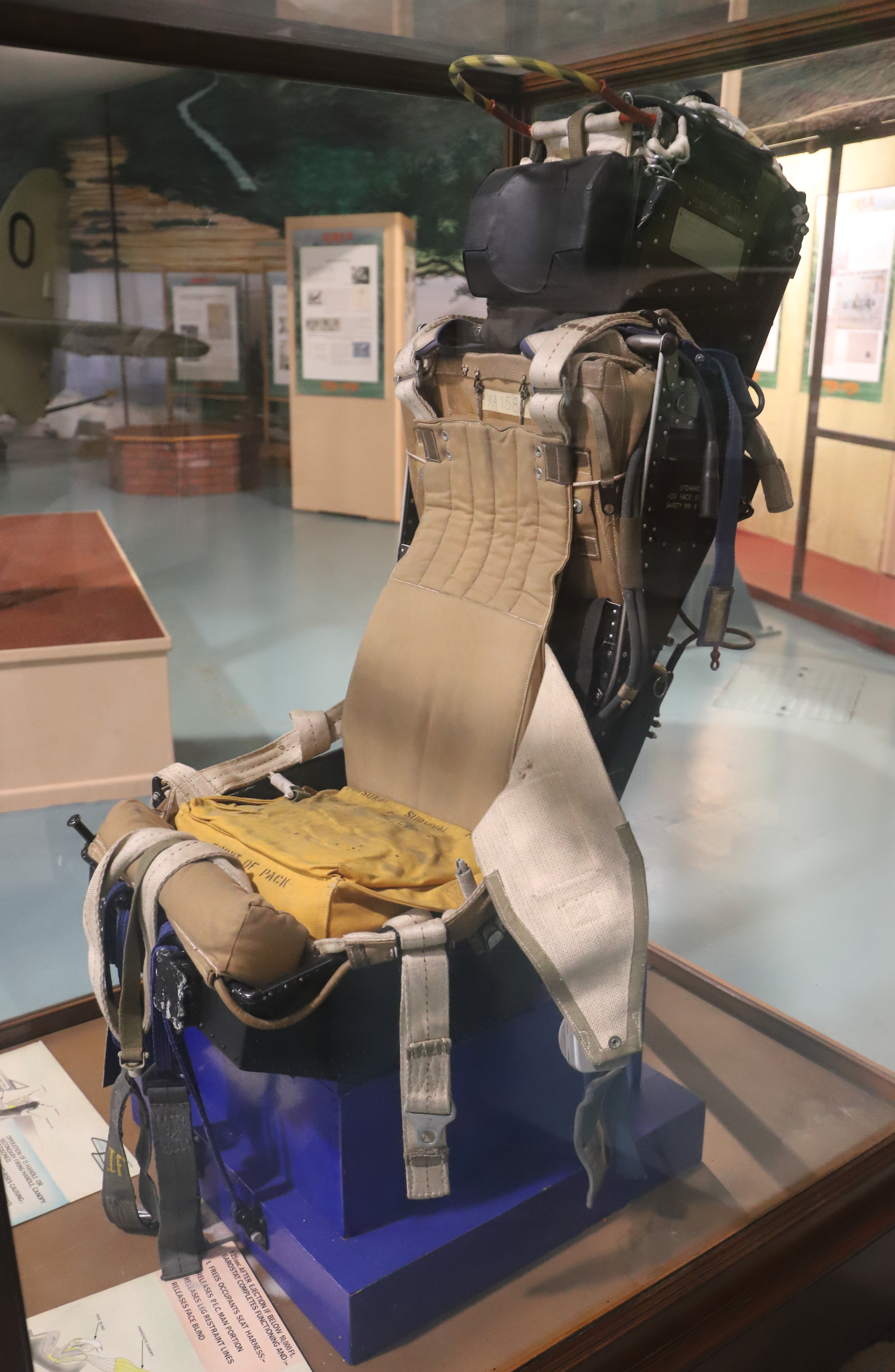
Martin-Baker Mk 3 ejection seat on display at the Fleet Air Arm Museum, RNAS Yeovilton

The Mk.3 ejection seat has been installed in the following aircraft types:

- Avro Vulcan
- de Havilland Vampire
- English Electric Canberra
- Fairey Delta 2 and BAC 221 (rebuilt Fairey Delta 2)
- Gloster Javelin
- Handley Page Victor
- Hawker Hunter
- Vickers Valiant
- Supermarine Swift

== Seats on display ==
A Martin-Baker Mk.2 seat is on display at the Midland Air Museum.

== Specifications (Mk.2) ==
- Maximum operating speed: 400 knots indicated airspeed (KIAS)
