= Edwin Flavell (RAF officer) =

Royal Air Force officer

Ted Flavell
- Born: 25 April 1922; Battersea, London, England
- Died: 24 February 2014 (aged 91) Shipton Gorge, Dorset, England
- Allegiance: United Kingdom
- Branch: Royal Air Force
- Service years: 1937–1968
- Rank: Squadron Leader
- Service number: 56326
- Conflicts: World War II: Operation Tonga; Operation Market Garden; Palestine Emergency
- Awards: Air Force Cross

Squadron Leader Edwin James George "Ted" Flavell AFC (25 April 1922 – 24 February 2014) was the pilot of the No. 49 Squadron RAF Vickers Valiant bomber which dropped Britain's first live atomic bomb (Blue Danube) during Operation Buffalo at Maralinga, South Australia, on 11 October 1956.

== Early life ==
Ted Flavell was born in Battersea, London Borough of Wandsworth, on 25 April 1922, the first son of Edwin William Conquest Flavell (1898–1993), a British Army officer who served in World War I and World War II, eventually rising to the rank of Brigadier.

== Military service ==
Unlike his father and brother, James Sydney Channell "Jim" Flavell (1924–2008) who followed careers in the British Army, Ted was keen on joining the Royal Air Force and went to RAF Halton as an aircraft mechanic apprentice in 1937. In 1938 he was selected for aircrew and sent to Canada for pilot training.

When Ted Flavell returned to England after the outbreak of World War II, he flew Armstrong Whitworth Whitley, Albemarle, Short Stirling and Handley Page Halifax aircraft. He flew many secret missions over Europe and Scandinavia, inserting agents and dropping supplies in occupied territories. He also flew aircraft towing glider transports for airborne operations, supporting the Normandy landings on D-Day (see Operation Tonga) and the Battle of Arnhem (see Operation Market Garden). Meanthile, Ted's father commanded the 1st Parachute Brigade in North Africa and the 6th Airlanding Brigade in Normandy, before becoming Deputy Chief of Staff of the First Allied Airborne Army. Ted's brother Jim served as a second lieutenant in the 2nd Battalion, Parachute Regiment, and like Ted took part in the Battle of Arnhem where Jim was taken prisoner of war.

Ted Flavell was next posted to Palestine during the Palestine Emergency, and on his return to England, married Sheila. He went on to the experimental establishment at RAF Beaulieu where he flew many different types of aircraft. After World War II, he flew Vickers Wellington, Avro Lincoln and English Electric Canberra bombers and was in the first group of pilots trained for the Vickers Valiant. Ted Flavell was assigned to No. 49 Squadron RAF, which operated the Vickers Valiant from RAF Wittering and RAF Marham from 1 May 1956 until 1 May 1965.

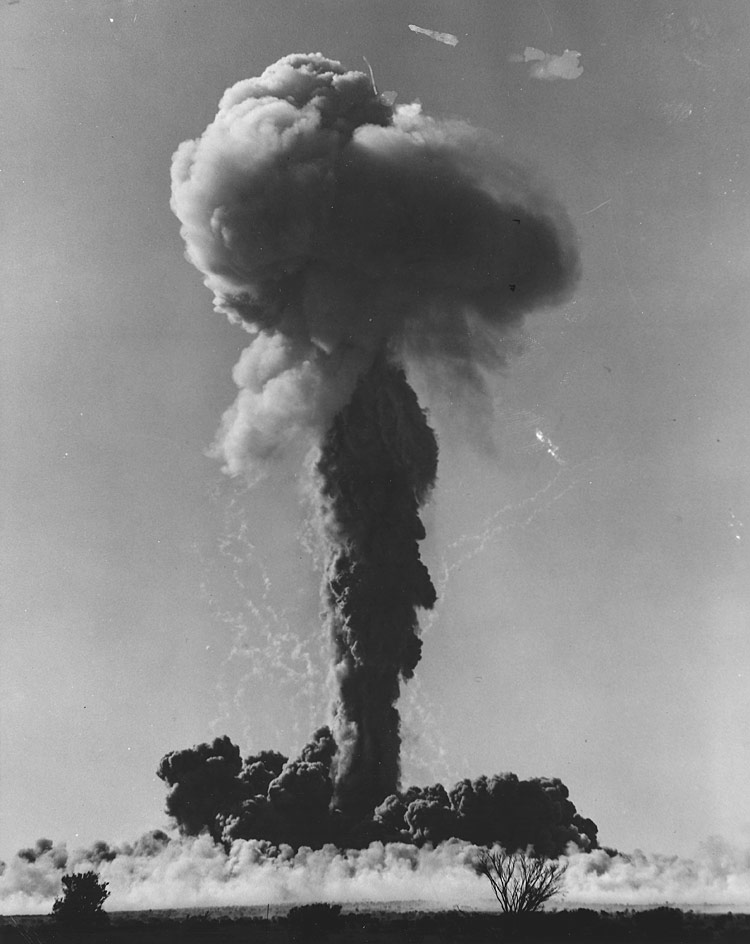
A mushroom cloud rising over Maralinga on 11 October 1956 after a Vickers Valiant piloted by Ted Flavell carried out the first British air drop of an atomic bomb.

During Operation Buffalo in autumn 1956, No. 49 Squadron participated in the British nuclear tests at Maralinga in South Australia. On 11 October 1956, the squadron's Vickers Valiant B.1 WZ366, piloted by Flavell, became the first British aircraft to drop a live atomic bomb. Originally the air drop was to be the last of four tests, but William Penney, the Chief Superintendent Armament Research, decided to swap the last two, making the air drop the third test. The air drop was the most difficult test, as the worst-case scenario involved the radar fuses failing and the bomb detonating on impact with the ground, which would result in severe fallout. The RAF therefore conducted a series of practice drops with high explosive bombs. In the end, in view of the Atomic Weapons Tests Safety Committee's concerns about the dangers of a 40-kiloton-of-TNT (170 TJ) test, a low-yield Blue Danube core with less fissile material was substituted, reducing the yield of the Buffalo R3/Kite test to 3 kilotons of TNT (13 TJ). Dropped by the bomb aimer, Flight Lieutenant Eric Stacey, the bomb fell about 91 metres (100 yd) left and 55 metres (60 yd) short of the target, detonating at a height of 150 metres (490 ft) at 15:27. The yield was 3 kilotons of TNT (13 TJ). Two clouds formed, a low-level one at about 2,100 metres (7,000 ft) that dropped its radioactive material inside the prohibited area, and a high-level one at 3,700 metres (12,000 ft) that deposited a negligible amount of fallout over South Australia, Victoria and New South Wales. Flavell and Stacey were awarded the Air Force Cross in the 1957 New Year Honours.

After withdrawing from active flying, Squadron Leader Flavell held positions within the Royal Air Force in aircrew selection, served a two-year posting to Aden and occupied a staff position at the Ministry of Defence. He eventually retired from the Royal Air Force in 1968 after over thirty years of service.

== Later life ==
In retirement, Flavell lived at Shipton Gorge in southwest Dorset. In Shipton he was involved in hospital patient transport work and Royal Air Forces Association welfare work, for which he was made life vice-president of the latter organisation.

== Family ==
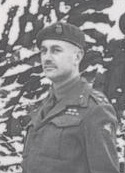
Ted's father, Brigadier Edwin Flavell, during the Battle of the Bulge in January 1945

Flavell was the first son of Brigadier Edwin Flavell and his first wife Norah Alice Cooper.

With his wife Sheila, Ted Flavell had three children. His daughter died in 1990 and his wife in 2001. Squadron Leader Flavell died on 24 February 2014 at the age of 91. He was survived by a son and daughter, six grandchildren and four great-grandchildren.

== See also ==
- Kenneth Hubbard (1920–2004), pilot of the RAF bomber which dropped Britain's first live thermonuclear bomb in 1957
