= Project E =

Cold War project for the US to provide the UK with nuclear weapons

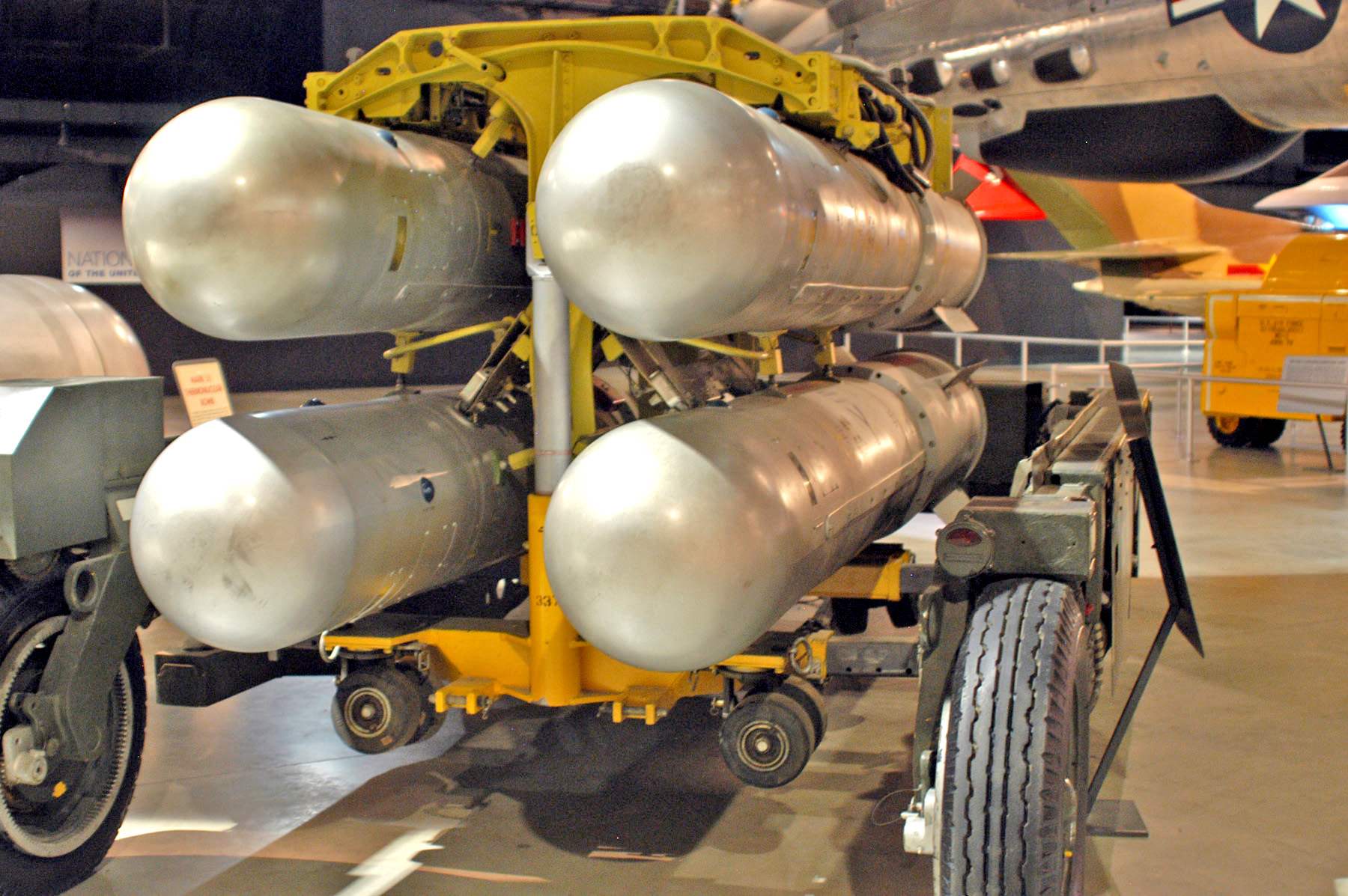
- Set of four Mark 28 nuclear bombs of the type supplied to the United Kingdom under Project E
- Type of project: Deployment of nuclear weapons
- Country: United States; United Kingdom
- Established: 1957
- Disestablished: 1992

Project E was a joint project between the United States and the United Kingdom during the Cold War to provide nuclear weapons to the Royal Air Force (RAF) until sufficient British nuclear weapons became available. It was subsequently expanded to provide similar arrangements for the British Army of the Rhine. A maritime version of Project E known as Project N provided nuclear depth bombs used by the RAF Coastal Command.

The British nuclear weapons project, High Explosive Research, successfully tested a nuclear weapon in Operation Hurricane in October 1952, but production was slow and Britain had only ten atomic bombs on hand in 1955 and fourteen in 1956. The prime minister of the United Kingdom, Winston Churchill, approached the president of the United States, Dwight D. Eisenhower, with a request that the US supply nuclear weapons for the strategic bombers of the V bomber fleet until sufficient British weapons became available. This became known as Project E. Under an agreement reached in 1957, US personnel had custody of the weapons, and performed all tasks related to their storage, maintenance and readiness. The bombs were held in secure storage areas (SSAs) on the same bases as the bombers.

The first bombers equipped with Project E weapons were English Electric Canberras based in Germany and the UK that were assigned to NATO. These were replaced by Vickers Valiants in 1960 and 1961 as the long-range Avro Vulcan and Handley Page Victor assumed the strategic nuclear weapon delivery role. Project E weapons equipped V-bombers at three bases in the UK from 1958. Due to operational restrictions imposed by Project E, and the consequential loss of independence of half of the British nuclear deterrent, they were phased out in 1962 when sufficient British megaton weapons became available, but remained in use with the Valiants in the UK and RAF Germany until 1965.

Project E nuclear warheads were used on the sixty Thor Intermediate Range Ballistic Missiles operated by the RAF from 1959 to 1963 under Project Emily. The British Army acquired Project E warheads for its Corporal missiles in 1958. The US subsequently offered the Honest John missile as a replacement. They remained in service until 1977 when Honest John was superseded by the Lance missile. Eight-inch and 155 mm nuclear artillery rounds were also acquired under Project E. The last Project E weapons were withdrawn from service in 1992.

== Background ==
During the early part of the Second World War, Britain had a nuclear weapons project codenamed Tube Alloys. At the Quebec Conference in August 1943, the prime minister of the United Kingdom, Winston Churchill, and the president of the United States, Franklin Roosevelt, signed the Quebec Agreement, which merged Tube Alloys with the American Manhattan Project to create a combined British, American and Canadian project. The September 1944 Hyde Park Aide-Mémoire extended commercial and military cooperation into the post-war period. Many of Britain's top scientists participated in the Manhattan Project. The Quebec Agreement specified that nuclear weapons would not be used against another country without mutual consent. On 4 July 1945, Field Marshal Sir Henry Maitland Wilson agreed on Britain's behalf to the use of nuclear weapons against Japan.

The British government considered nuclear technology to be a joint discovery, and trusted that America would continue to share it. On 16 November 1945, President Harry S. Truman and Prime Minister Clement Attlee signed a new agreement that replaced the Quebec Agreement's requirement for "mutual consent" before using nuclear weapons with one for "prior consultation", and there was to be "full and effective cooperation in the field of atomic energy", but this was only "in the field of basic scientific research". The United States Atomic Energy Act of 1946 (McMahon Act) ended technical cooperation. Its control of "restricted data" prevented US allies from receiving any information. Fearing a resurgence of American isolationism, and Britain losing its great power status, the UK government restarted its own development effort, now codenamed High Explosive Research.

In 1949, the Americans offered to make atomic bombs in the US available for Britain to use if the British agreed to curtail their atomic bomb programme. This would have given Britain nuclear weapons much sooner than its own target date of late 1952. Only those bomb components required by war plans would be stored in the UK; the rest would be kept in the US and Canada. The offer was rejected by the British Chiefs of Staff on the grounds that it was not "compatible with our status as a first class power to depend on others for weapons of this supreme importance". As a counter-offer, they proposed limiting the British nuclear weapons programme in return for American bombs. The opposition of key American officials, including the United States Atomic Energy Commission's Lewis Strauss, and Senators Bourke B. Hickenlooper and Arthur Vandenberg, coupled with security concerns aroused by the 2 February 1950 arrest of the British physicist Klaus Fuchs as an atomic spy, resulted in the proposal being dropped.

== Negotiation ==
The first British atomic bomb was successfully tested in Operation Hurricane; it was detonated on board the frigate HMS Plym anchored off the Monte Bello Islands in Australia on 3 October 1952. The first Blue Danube atomic bombs were delivered to the Royal Air Force (RAF) Bomber Command Armaments School at RAF Wittering on 7 and 11 November 1953, but the RAF had no bombers capable of carrying them. The first production order for 25 Vickers Valiants was issued on 9 February 1951, and they were delivered on 8 February 1955.

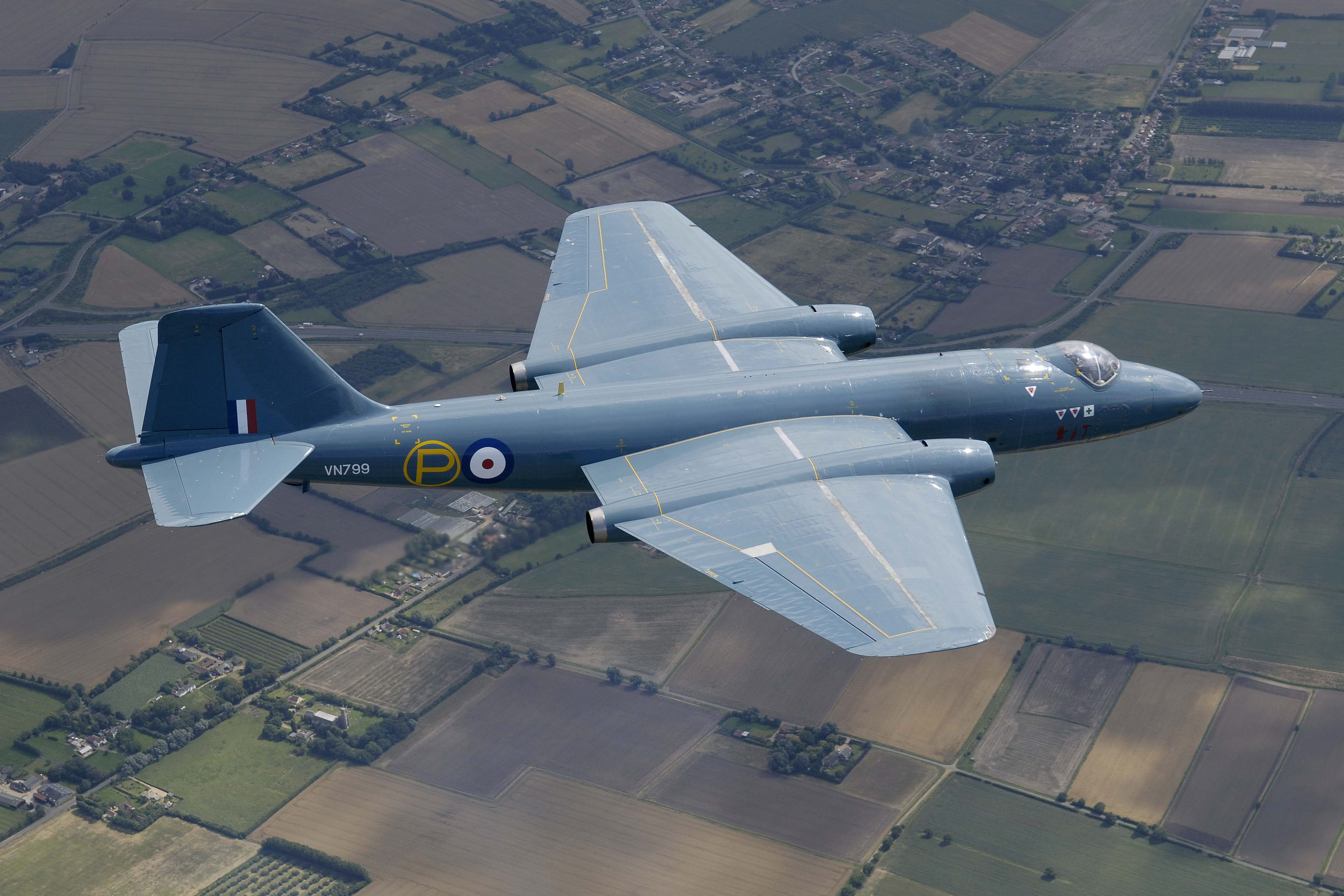
English Electric Canberra

Once production of V-bombers began in earnest, their numbers soon exceeded that of the available atomic bombs. Production of atomic bombs was slow, and Britain had only ten on hand in 1955, and fourteen in 1956. At this rate, there would not be sufficient bombs to arm all the V-bombers until 1961. At the three-power Bermuda Conference with President Dwight D. Eisenhower in December 1953, Churchill suggested that the US allow Britain access to American nuclear weapons to make up the shortfall. There were several technical and legal issues. For American bombs to be carried in British aircraft, the US would have to disclose weights and dimensions, while their delivery would require data concerning their ballistics. The release of such information was restricted by the McMahon Act. There would also be issues of custody, security and targeting.

In May 1954, the Vice Chief of Staff of the United States Air Force (USAF), General Thomas D. White, approached the head of the British Joint Staff Mission (BJSM) in Washington, DC, General Sir John Whiteley, with an offer to provide the RAF with an interim force of up to 90 new Boeing B-47 Stratojet bombers. This represented about $400 million in equipment that would not be counted against the Mutual Defense Assistance Program. The RAF was wary. The B-47 was judged inferior to the English Electric Canberra although it had greater range and could carry a larger bomb load. It would require 10,000-foot (3,000 m) runways, and the RAF had had a bad experience with the last American-built bomber it operated, the Boeing Washington. Above all, there was the potential loss of prestige and independence. The head of RAF Bomber Command, Sir Hugh Lloyd, favoured acceptance, but the Secretary of State for Air, Lord de L'Isle and Dudley, and the Minister of Supply, Duncan Sandys, advised Churchill against it. In June, the Chief of the Air Staff, Sir William Dickson, informed the Chief of Staff of the United States Air Force, General Nathan Twining, that the RAF was declining the offer.

In the lead-up to Churchill's next meeting with Eisenhower in June 1954, the president's assistant for atomic energy, Major General Howard G. Bunker, discussed carriage of American atomic bombs in British aircraft with the BJSM. A detailed list of the equipment and technical data required was drawn up, and the USAF undertook to provide training and technical assistance, and to establish facilities to store, assemble and assist with loading the bombs. The McMahon act was amended in August 1954, and while it did not go nearly as far as the British government wanted—the transfer of information regarding the design and manufacture of nuclear weapons was still prohibited—it did now allow for the interchange of information on their use. This paved the way for the Agreement for Cooperation Regarding Atomic Information for Mutual Defence Purposes with Britain, which was signed on 15 June 1955. A colonel and two majors from the USAF and the Armed Forces Special Weapons Project were given briefings on RAF aircraft to determine which US bombs could be carried. The Americans then wanted to know how many bombs would be required. The Minister of Defence, Harold Macmillan, determined that the V-bomber force would reach a strength of 240 aircraft during 1958. Each would carry one atomic bomb.

Dickson visited the US for talks with Twining in September 1955. A public announcement was made in the form of a news leak published in The Daily Telegraph and The New York Times on 8 June 1956, which was officially denied the following day. Agreement on the provision of American bombs—now called Project E—was reached, resulting in a detailed plan on 12 December 1956. This was then approved by the United States Secretary of Defense, Charles E. Wilson, and the Joint Chiefs of Staff. The UK government notified Wilson of its approval on 30 January 1957. The agreement was confirmed by Eisenhower and Macmillan, now Prime Minister, during their March 1957 meeting in Bermuda to repair the damage done to Anglo-American relations by the Suez Crisis. A formal Memorandum of Understanding was negotiated in Washington by the deputy chief of the Air Staff, Air Marshal Sir Geoffrey Tuttle, on 21 May 1957.

In a letter to Macmillan on 25 March 1957, Eisenhower stated:

The United States Government welcomes the agreement to coordinate the strike plans of the United States and United Kingdom bomber forces, and to store United States nuclear weapons on RAF airfields under United States custody for release subject to decision by the President in an emergency. We understand that for the present at least these weapons will be in the kiloton range. The United Kingdom forces could obviously play a much more effective part in joint strikes if the United States weapons made available to them in emergency were in the megaton range, and it is suggested that this possibility might be examined at the appropriate time."

== Implementation ==
=== Tactical bombers ===
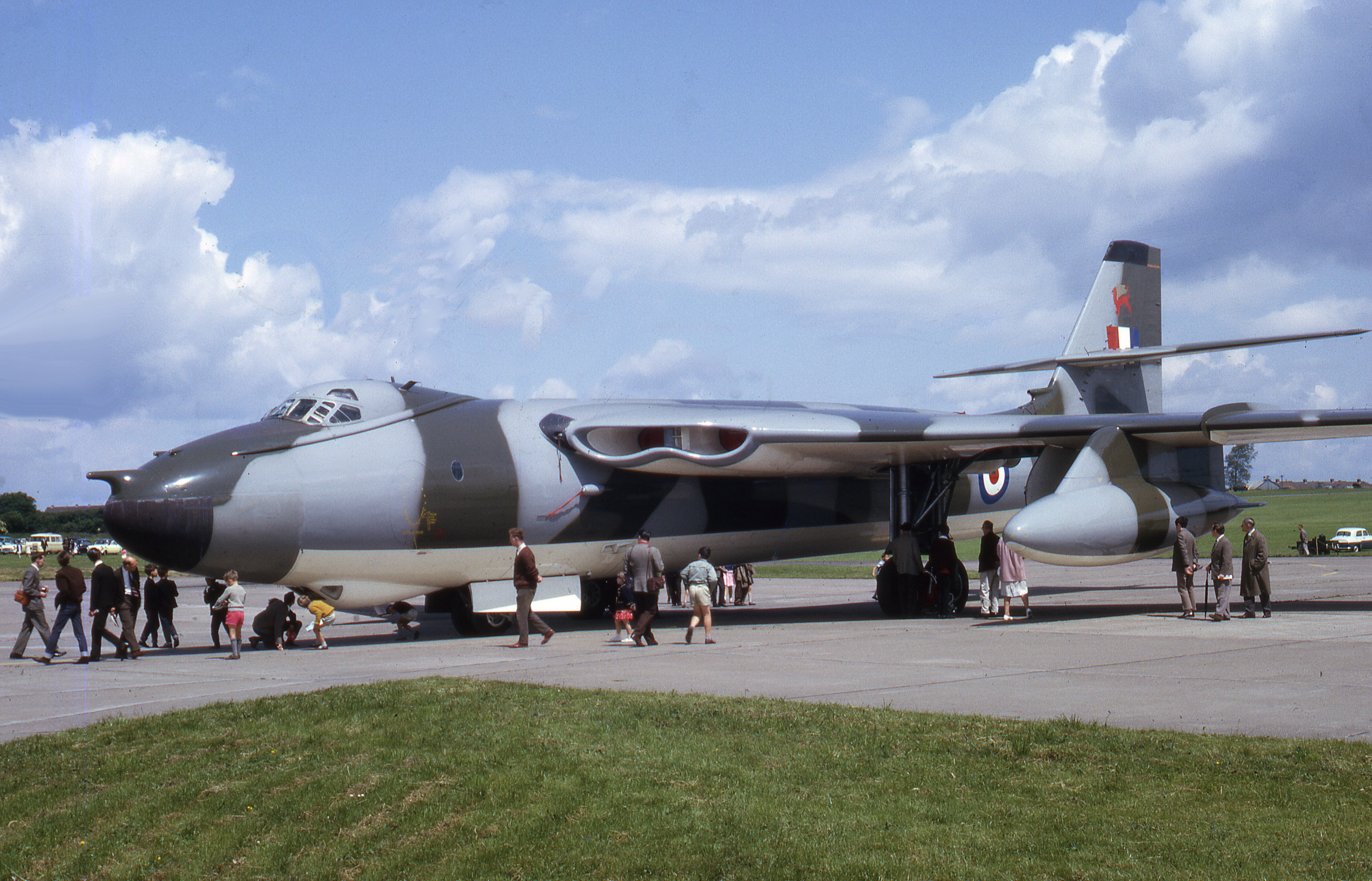
Vickers Valiant

It fell to the commander of the UK-based US Third Air Force, Major General Roscoe C. Wilson, to initiate Project E. Wilson had been liaison officer with the Manhattan Project, and Deputy Chief of the Armed Forces Special Weapons Project, and was very familiar with nuclear weapons. The first aircraft to be fitted for American atomic bombs were not V-bombers but 28 Canberra bombers earmarked as night interdictors for the Supreme Allied Commander Europe (SACEUR) in 1957. These were new B(I)8 models, which came straight from the manufacturer for modification to carry the Mark 7 nuclear bomb. The intention was that they would be able to carry either American or British bombs, but since the latter were not available, they were only fitted for American bombs. Later-model Canberras would be able to carry both. Since the specifications for the bomb bay doors said they opened 52 inches (1,300 mm) wide, and the tail fins of the bombs were between 50.36 and 50.69 inches (1,279 and 1,288 mm) wide, no problem was anticipated, but it turned out that the doors only opened between 50.50 and 51.19 inches (1,283 and 1,300 mm), depending on the aircraft, which meant that the bombs would have to be individually matched with aircraft. After some thought, 0.5 inches (13 mm) was cut off each bomb fin.

Four squadrons of Canberras were based in Germany, their Mark 7 bombs being stored at RAF Germany bases at RAF Bruggen, RAF Geilenkirchen, RAF Laarbruch and RAF Wildenrath. The crews practised the Low Altitude Bombing System (LABS) for tactical nuclear attacks. There were also four squadrons of nuclear-armed Canberras based in the UK at RAF Coningsby and RAF Upwood; these were capable of using either the Mark 7 or the British Red Beard nuclear weapons. They too were assigned to the SACEUR in October 1960. The Air Ministry decided to replace these Canberras with Valiants as the Avro Vulcan and Handley Page Victor V-bombers became available and replaced the Valiants in the strategic role. A Valiant squadron at RAF Marham was assigned to SACEUR on 1 January 1961, followed by two more in July. The UK-based Canberra squadrons were then disbanded. Each of the 24 Valiants was equipped with two of the more powerful Project E B28 nuclear bombs. These were replaced by the newer B43 nuclear bombs, which were more suitable for laydown delivery, in early 1963. The availability of US bombs meant that more British bombs were available for use elsewhere. A permanent storage site for 32 Red Beards was opened at RAF Akrotiri on Cyprus in November 1961, and one for 48 Red Beards at RAF Tengah in Singapore. Only the aircraft on Quick Reaction Alert (QRA) were armed with a pair of live bombs. These aircraft were kept armed and fuelled on hardstands surrounded by 6-foot (1.8 m) high chain-link fences. The Valiants were taken out of service in 1965. The Canberras continued in service, with their Project E B43 bombs until the last was retired in June 1972. They were replaced by Phantom FGR.2s, which carried Project E B43 and B57 nuclear bombs between June 1972 and October 1976, when they in turn were replaced in the tactical nuclear role by the Jaguar GR.1, which carried British WE.177 bombs.

=== Strategic bombers ===
Project E modifications to Valiants commenced at RAE Farnborough in February 1956. Crew training was carried out with American instructors at RAF Boscombe Down. The planned V-bomber force had now been reduced to 144 aircraft, and it was intended to equip half of them with Project E weapons. The first 28 Valiants were modified by October 1957; the remaining 20 Valiants, along with 24 Vulcans, were ready by January 1959. The Victors were also modified to carry US weapons.

Under the Project E Memorandum of Understanding, US personnel had custody of the weapons. That meant they performed all the tasks related to their storage, maintenance and readiness. The bombs were kept in secure storage areas (SSAs) on the same bases as the bombers. British staff were not permitted to enter the SSAs; it was therefore impossible to store British and Americans bombs in the same SSA. Bomber Command designated RAF Marham, RAF Waddington and RAF Honington as bases with US SSAs. Another three sites had British SSAs. US custody created operational problems. The procedure for handing over the bombs added an extra ten minutes to the bombers' reaction time, and the requirement that US personnel had guardianship of the weapons at all times meant that neither they nor the bombers could be relocated to dispersal airfields as the RAF desired.

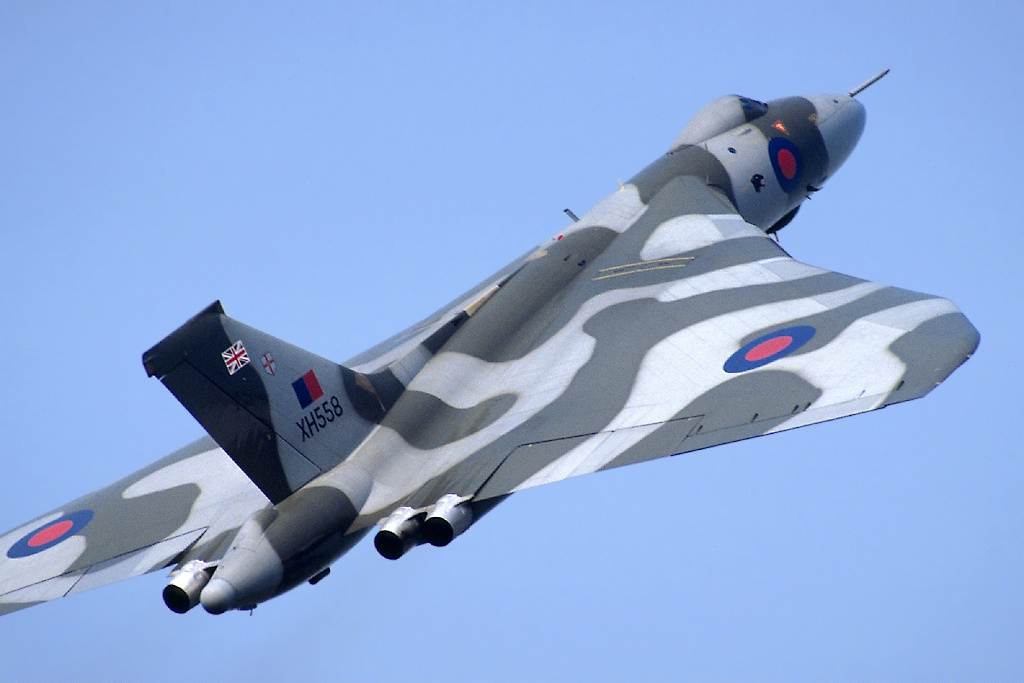
Avro Vulcan

Initially, 72 Mark 5 nuclear bombs were supplied for the V-bombers. They had a yield of up to 100 kilotonnes of TNT (420 TJ). The successful British development of the hydrogen bomb, and a favourable international relations climate caused by the Sputnik crisis, led to the United States Atomic Energy Act being amended again in 1958, resulting in the long-sought resumption of the nuclear Special Relationship between Britain and the US in the form of the 1958 US–UK Mutual Defence Agreement. The US now agreed to supply the V-bombers with megaton weapons in place of the Mark 5, in the form of Mark 15 and Mark 39 nuclear bombs.

The Treasury immediately inquired as to whether this meant that the British megaton bomb programme could be terminated. Project E was intended to be a stopgap measure, and while the RAF was impressed with the superior yield of US thermonuclear weapons, its Director of Plans noted that "by retaining Project E at its present strength the US may continue to underestimate the UK independent capability, so that the weight given to HM Government's influence on vital issues would be less than it might otherwise be." Both Sandys and the Chief of the Air Staff, Air Chief Marshal Sir Dermot Boyle, argued that the UK needed the capacity to initiate a nuclear war unilaterally, but this was not possible if US permission was required for half of the force. With sufficient British bombs becoming available, operational issues and the concept of an independent nuclear deterrent came to the fore.

The Air Council decided on 7 July 1960 that Project E weapons would be phased out by December 1962, by which time it was anticipated that there would be sufficient British megaton weapons to equip the entire strategic bomber force. Project E weapons were replaced by British Yellow Sun bombs at RAF Honington on 1 July 1961 and Waddington on 30 March 1962. Problems encountered in the development of Red Beard meant that the replacement of kiloton weapons took longer. The UK-based Valiants at Honington and Wittering were withdrawn in April and October 1962, and the last Valiants were retired from the V-bomber force in July 1965. The final practice loading at RAF Marham—with the Mark 43s—was in January 1965, and the last US personnel left the base in July.

=== British Army of the Rhine ===
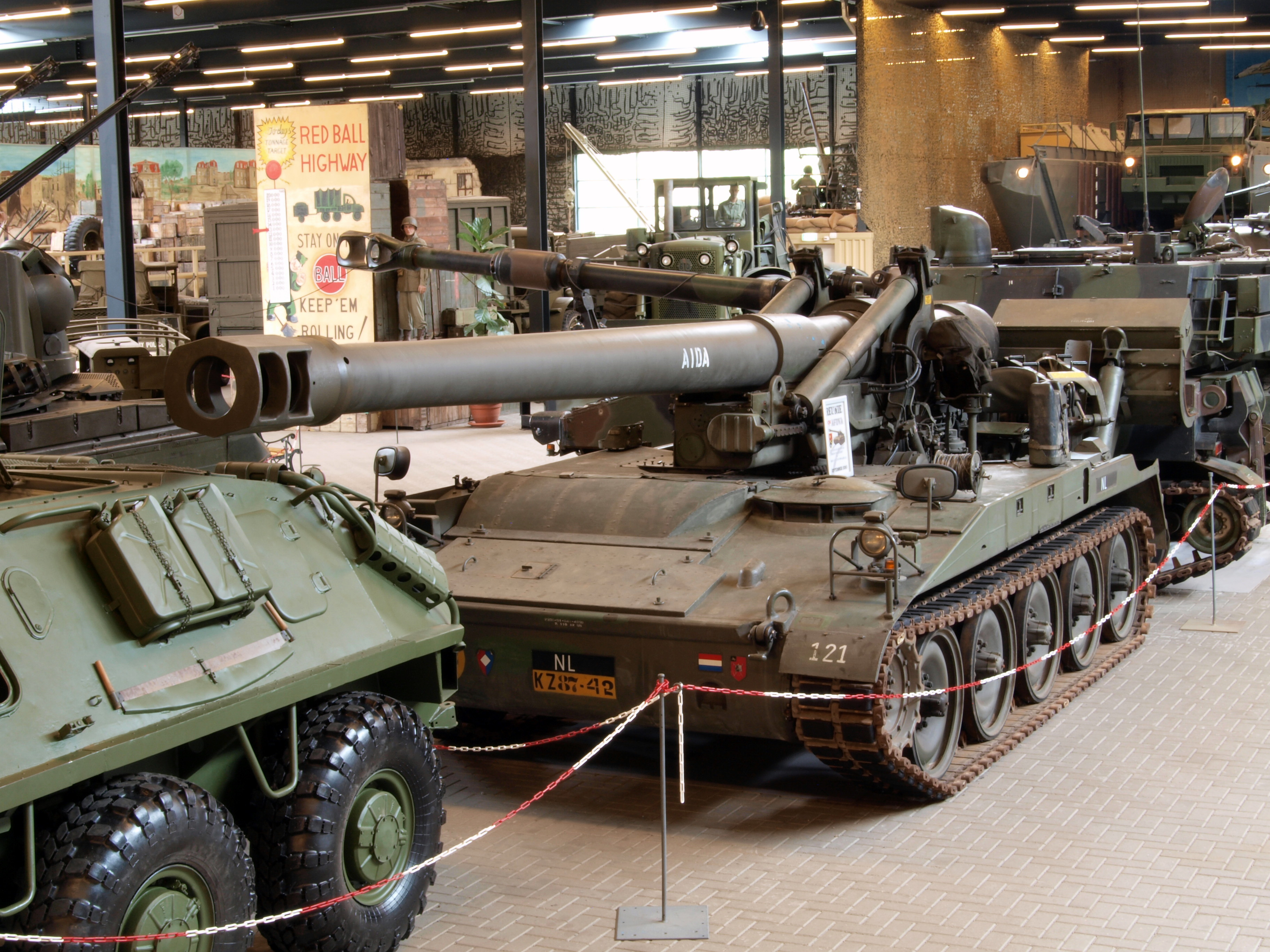
M110 howitzer

Project E was expanded to encompass similar arrangements for providing nuclear weapons to the British Army of the Rhine (BAOR). NATO began integrating tactical nuclear weapons into its war plans in 1954, and BAOR adopted a doctrine under which it would be the dominant arm on the battlefield as NATO forces conducted a fighting withdrawal to the Rhine. In 1954, the British Army purchased 113 Corporal missiles from the US. It was intended that they would be equipped with British warheads under a project codenamed Violet Vision, but Project E offered a quicker, simpler and cheaper alternative. Weapons were made available under the same terms as those of the RAF: US custody and dual control. 27 Guided Weapons Regiment, Royal Artillery, based at the Napier Barracks in Dortmund, became the first unit to equip with the Corporal in June 1960. A second Corporal regiment, 47 Guided Weapons Regiment, Royal Artillery, was formed at the Napier Barracks in 1961. Between them they had about 100 Corporal missiles. The Mark 7 warheads had to be drawn from US Army storage sites in southern Germany until arrangements were made for local storage in August 1959.

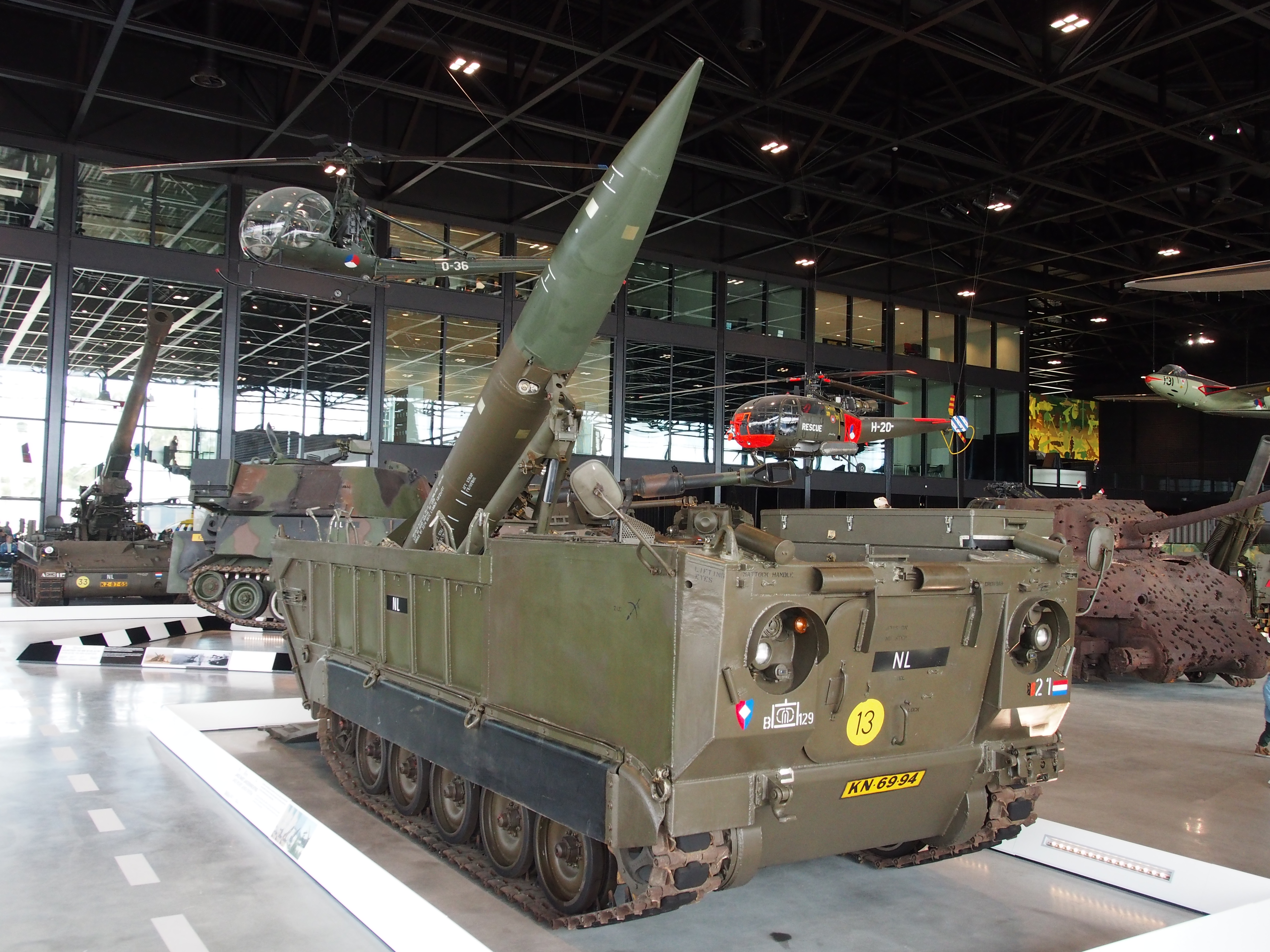
Lance missile

The Corporal had several limitations. It was liquid-fuelled, and the hydrazine fuel and nitric acid oxidiser were highly toxic and corrosive; it required several hours to fuel, so it could not engage targets of opportunity; there could be delays in the countdown process, which made it hard to warn the troops to close their eyes or aircraft to avoid the area; and it was guided by a radio beam that could be jammed or diverted. During test firings in the Outer Hebrides, eight out of twelve missiles accurately hit their targets; four fell short, a significant concern given the danger nuclear weapons posed to friendly troops. A new British project was begun to develop a better missile, codenamed Blue Water, which was to have used the British Indigo Hammer and later the Tony warhead. 47 Regiment gave up its Corporals in 1965, and returned to the UK, and the 27 Regiment followed in 1967. The British government's September 1965 announcement of the withdrawal of the Corporal missiles raised concerns in West Germany that Britain might "de-denuclearise" BAOR.

As an interim measure, the US offered the Honest John missile. The offer was accepted, and 120 Honest John missiles with W31 warheads were supplied in 1960, enough to equip three artillery regiments: 24 Regiment at Assaye Barracks in Nienburg from 1960 to 1962 and then at Barker Barracks in Paderborn from 1962 to 1972; 39 Regiment at Dempsey Barracks in Sennelager; and 50 Regiment at Menden. Each regiment had two batteries of Honest Johns, and two of nuclear-capable eight-inch M115 howitzers, which were later replaced by M110 howitzers with W33 nuclear warheads. Yellow Anvil, a British nuclear artillery round project, was cancelled in 1958, and Blue Water met the same fate on 10 August 1962. The Honest Johns therefore remained in service until 1977. The 50 Missile Regiment was then re-equipped with the Lance missile, with its W70 nuclear warhead. With four batteries, 50 Missile Regiment had the same number of launchers as the three Honest John regiments. The W48 was acquired for the 155 mm M109 howitzers. Both it and the W33 remained in service until 1992. The British Army also considered acquiring the Davy Crockett, but had decided against it by February 1962.

=== Intermediate Range Ballistic Missiles ===
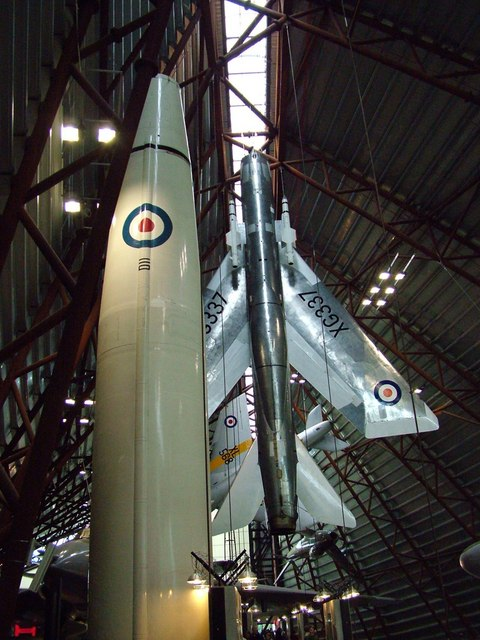
Thor missile at the Royal Air Force Museum Cosford

In 1953, the US Secretary of Defense, Charles E. Wilson, raised the possibility of a joint ballistic missile programme with the Minister of Supply, Duncan Sandys. This resulted in an agreement on collaboration being signed on 12 August 1954, and a British Medium Range Ballistic Missile (MRBM) development project codenamed Blue Streak. The United States pursued two Intermediate Range Ballistic Missile (IRBM) projects in parallel to Blue Streak: the US Army's Jupiter and the USAF's Thor. When Sandys, now the Minister of Defence, visited the US in January 1957, he found the Americans anxious to deploy IRBMs in Britain. Macmillan and Eisenhower agreed to do so during their summit in Bermuda in March 1957, and a formal agreement was drawn up on 17 December; at the end of the month it was decided that Britain would receive Thor and not Jupiter missiles. The deployment was codenamed Project Emily.

The RAF activated 20 squadrons between September 1958 and December 1959 to operate the 120 Thor missiles. They were located at 20 old wartime airfields so that the government did not have to purchase new land. Each missile was supplied with its own Mark 49 warhead, a variant of the Mark 28 with a thinner and lighter casing. While the Thor missile bases were manned by the RAF, the warheads were supplied under Project E. Each had a USAF authorisation officer. The missiles used a dual key system, one of which was held by the authorisation officer. Occasionally a missile would be chosen for test firing, for which the missile and its RAF crew would be flown to Vandenberg Air Force Base in California. Twelve test firings were conducted between 6 October 1959 and 12 June 1962. Under the original agreement, the USAF paid the cost of maintenance for the missiles for five years. After a debate over costs and benefits, the Air Council decided on 31 May 1962 that Project Emily should be terminated by the end of 1963. The last Thor squadrons were inactivated on 23 August 1963. The missiles were returned to the United States.

=== Project N ===
A maritime version of Project E was created, known as Project N. Providing American atomic bombs for Royal Navy ships would have involved similar dual key arrangements and detachments of US Marines on board Royal Navy ships. This was deemed impractical even for ships and weapons dedicated to use in European waters. RAF Coastal Command acquired Mk 101 Lulu nuclear depth bombs (with the W34 nuclear warhead) for its Avro Shackleton and Hawker Siddeley Nimrod maritime patrol aircraft from 1965 to 1971 under Project N. These were replaced by the more capable Mark 57, which was stockpiled at RAF St Mawgan and RAF Machrihanish for US, Dutch and British aircraft.

== Impact on British nuclear weapon development ==
As well as meeting the needs of the UK forces, Project E affected the design and development of British nuclear weapons. Interim designs like Violet Club were no longer required, as Project E weapons could do the job pending the development of a British weapon. The British designers were particularly impressed by the Mark 28, which was not only lighter than the British Green Grass warhead used in Yellow Sun, but considerably more economical in its use of expensive fissile material. An Anglicised version of the Mark 28 was developed, known as Red Snow, and a Yellow Sun Mark 2 using Red Snow cost £500,000 compared with £1,200,000 for the Mark 1 with Green Grass.

== End of Project E ==
When the Cold War ended in 1991, there were more than 500 US nuclear weapons in the UK. Of these, about 400 were bombs, 48 were Ground Launched Cruise Missiles, and approximately 100 were B57 nuclear depth bombs. The BAOR still had about 85 Lance missiles, and more than 70 W33 eight-inch and W48 155 mm nuclear artillery shells. The cruise missiles were withdrawn in 1991 under the terms of the 1987 Intermediate-Range Nuclear Forces Treaty. The United States then decided to withdraw its short-range nuclear weapons. The last US warheads, including the Mark 57 nuclear depth bombs and those used by the BAOR, were withdrawn in July 1992. The only American nuclear weapons then remaining in the UK were 110 or so B61 nuclear bombs stored at RAF Lakenheath for USAF F-15E Strike Eagles, which were withdrawn by 2008. The British WE.177 nuclear bombs used by the RAF and Royal Navy were withdrawn from service in August 1998, at which point the only remaining British nuclear weapons were the warheads on the Trident missiles of the Vanguard-class submarines.
