= List of missiles of the RAF =

The following list of missiles of the Royal Air Force contains both current and former missiles used by the British air force:

== Missiles ==
=== Current ===
- AMRAAM - Medium-range air-to-air missile. Carried by the Eurofighter Typhoon and F-35.
- ASRAAM - Short-range infrared homing air-to-air missile. Carried by the Eurofighter Typhoon and F-35B.
- Brimstone - Air-to-surface ground-attack missile. Carried by the Eurofighter Typhoon.
- Meteor - Air-to-air active radar homing beyond-visual-range missile. Carried by Typhoon.
- Storm Shadow - Anglo-French air-launched cruise missile. Carried by the Eurofighter Typhoon.

=== Former ===
==== Air-to-air ====
- Fireflash - Obsolete beam riding air-to-air missile. Carried by Gloster Meteor and Supermarine Swift test aircraft. In RAF service from 1955 to 1958.
- Firestreak - Obsolete air-to-air missile. Carried by the English Electric Lightning and Gloster Javelin. In RAF service from 1957 to 1988.
- Red Top - Obsolete infrared homing air-to-air missile. Carried by the English Electric Lightning. In RAF service from 1964 to 1988.
- Sidewinder - Short-range air-to-air missile. Carried by the Blackburn Buccaneer and British Aerospace Harrier II, Hawker Siddeley Harrier, Hawker Siddeley Hawk, Hawker Siddeley Nimrod McDonnell Douglas Phantom, SEPECAT Jaguar Panavia Tornado and Panavia Tornado ADV.
- Skyflash - Obsolete medium-range semi-active radar homing air-to-air missile. In RAF service from 1978 to 2006. Carried by the McDonnell Douglas Phantom and Panavia Tornado ADV.
- Sparrow - Medium-range semi-active radar homing air-to-air missile. Carried by the McDonnell Douglas Phantom.

==== Air-to-surface ====
- AS.11 - Air-to-surface anti-tank missile. Carried by the Westland Wessex and Westland Whirlwind helicopters
- AS.12 - Air-to-surface anti-tank missile. Carried by the Westland Wessex and Hawker Siddeley Nimrod
- AS-30 - Air-to-surface missile. Carried by the English Electric Canberra
- ALARM - Air-to-surface anti-radiation missile. Carried by the Panavia Tornado
- Blue Steel - Nuclear armed missile. Carried by the Avro Vulcan and Handley Page Victor V Bombers. In RAF from 1963 to 1970.
- Harpoon - Air-to-surface all-weather over-the-horizon anti-ship missile. Carried by the Hawker Siddeley Nimrod.
- Hellfire - Air-to-surface anti-tank missile.
- Martel - Anglo-French air-to-surface anti-radiation missile. Carried by the Blackburn Buccaneer and Hawker Siddeley Nimrod.
- Maverick - Air-to-surface missile. Carried by the British Aerospace Harrier II, Hawker Siddeley Nimrod and Panavia Tornado.
- Sea Eagle - Air-to-surface sea-skimming anti-ship missile. Carried by the Blackburn Buccaneer and Panavia Tornado.
- Shrike - Air-to-surface anti-radiation missile. Carried by the Avro Vulcan.
- Thor - Land-based intermediate-range ballistic missile. In RAF service from 1959 to 1963. See Project Emily

==== Surface-to-air ====
- Bloodhound - Land-based surface-to-air missile. In RAF service 1958 to 1991.
- Rapier - Land-based surface-to-air missile operated by the RAF Regiment.
- Tigercat - Short range surface-to-air missile system. Operated by the RAF Regiment from 1967 to 1978. Replaced by the Rapier surface to air missile.

== Unguided air-to-surface rockets ==
- 2-inch RP air-to-air, air-to-surface rockets. Retired
- RP-3 air-to-surface rockets. Retired
- SNEB 68-mm air-to-surface rocket pods
- CRV7 air-to-surface rocket pods
- 11-kg (25-lb) 76.2-mm (3-inch) air-to-surface rockets. Retired
- 28-kg (60-lb) air-to-surface rockets

== Laser-guided bombs ==
- Paveway
  - GBU-12 Paveway II
  - GBU-24 Paveway III
  - Paveway IV

== Homing torpedoes ==
- Mark 24 mine - Obsolete
- 18" Mark 30 torpedo - Carried by Avro Shackleton and Hawker Siddeley Nimrod. In service from 1954 to 1975.
- Mark 44 torpedo
- Mark 46 torpedo - Carried by the Hawker Siddeley Nimrod
- Marconi String Ray Torpedo - Carried by the Hawker Siddeley Nimrod

== List of Royal Air Force munitions ==
- Cooper bombs - "20lb" bomb used in First World War
- Blockbuster bomb - "High Capacity" bombs carried by the Avro Lancaster, de Havilland Mosquito and Vickers Wellington.
- Bouncing bomb - Specialist mine for attacking German dams.
- Grand Slam bomb - 10 ton earthquake bomb, only used for special targets.
- Tallboy bomb - 5 ton bomb, only used by the Avro Lancaster.
- BL755 cluster bomb - Withdrawn from service in 2007 and 2008.
- JP233 anti-runway weapon.

== List of nuclear weapons of the RAF ==
Type	Origin	Notes	Variants
B28 nuclear bomb	United States	Air dropped thermonuclear weapon. In service from 1960 to 1964, carried by the English Electric Canberra, McDonnell Douglas Phantom and Vickers Valiant V Bombers.	
B43 nuclear bomb	United States	Air dropped thermonuclear weapon. In service from 1964 to 1976, carried by the English Electric Canberra, McDonnell Douglas Phantom and Vickers Valiant.	
B57 nuclear bomb	United States	Air dropped tactical nuclear weapon. In service from 1970 to 1991, carried by English Electric Canberra, Hawker Siddeley Nimrod and McDonnell Douglas Phantom.	
Mark 5 nuclear bomb	United States	Air dropped nuclear bomb. In service from 1958 to 1965, carried by the Avro Vulcan. See Project E	
Mark 7 nuclear bomb	United States	Air dropped tactical nuclear bomb. In service from 1958 to 1965, carried by the English Electric Canberra	
Blue Danube	United Kingdom	Air dropped nuclear weapon. In service from 1953 to 1962, carried by the Avro Vulcan, Handley Page Victor and Vickers Valiant.	
Red Beard	United Kingdom	Free-fall tactical nuclear weapon. In service from 1961 to 1971, carried by the English Electric Canberra, Handley Page Victor, Hawker Siddeley Nimrod and Avro Vulcan.	Red Beard Mk 1, Red Beard Mk 2
Red Snow	United Kingdom	Thermonuclear warhead	
Violet Club	United Kingdom	Air dropped nuclear weapon. In service from 1958 to 1960, carried by the Avro Vulcan.	
W.65, Mk Lulu	United States	Air dropped nuclear depth charge. In service from 1965 to 1971. Carried by the Avro Shackleton and Hawker Siddeley Nimrod.	
WE.177	United Kingdom	Free-fall gravity nuclear bomb. In service from 1969 to 1998, carried by the Avro Shackleton, Avro Vulcan, Blackburn Buccaneer, English Electric Canberra, Handley Page Victor, SEPECAT Jaguar, Panavia Tornado.	WE.177A, WE.177B, WE.177C
Yellow Sun nuclear bomb	United Kingdom	Air dropped strategic nuclear weapon. In service from 1958 to 1972, carried Avro Vulcan and the Vickers Valiant.	Yellow Sun Mk 1, Yellow Sun Mk 2
Avro Blue Steel	United Kingdom	Air-launched, rocket-propelled stand-off missile. In service from 1963 to 1970, carried by the Avro Vulcan and Handley Page Victor.	
Douglas Thor	United States	Land-based Intermediate-range ballistic missile. In service from 1958 to 1963. See Project Emily	PGM-17A Thor
