= Python (nuclear primary) =

Gas-boosted fission primary used in some American thermonuclear weapons

According to researcher Chuck Hansen, the W34 Python was a gas-boosted fission primary used in several designs of American thermonuclear weapons.

Hansen's research indicates that the W34 Python primary was used in the US B28 nuclear bomb, W28, W40, and W49, and as a boosted fission warhead without a thermonuclear second stage in several other weapons. These were the Mark 45 ASTOR wire-guided 19-inch (48 cm), submarine-launched heavyweight torpedo; the Mk 101 Lulu nuclear depth bomb; the Mk 105 Hotpoint laydown bomb.

Additionally, an anglicised W34 Python known to the British as 'Peter' was manufactured in Britain as the primary for Red Snow, itself an anglicised W28 warhead. Peter was also proposed as a replacement for the Red Beard warhead housed in a Red Beard carcass, and as the Violet Mist nuclear land mine for the British Army in Germany.

The W34 used the melt-cast high explosive Octol, a mixture of HMX and TNT as the material for its implosion lenses, and this relatively unsophisticated explosive that pre-dated PBX was perhaps a reason why the British adopted this warhead, since they were attempting to deploy a thermonuclear warhead for their strategic bombers quickly, and the British were well-versed in the manufacture, storage and use of these melt-cast explosives.

Declassified British military documents also refer to a 'Low-Yield-Python' and the AIR-2 Genie air-to-air rocket being considered by the UK for their interceptors, suggesting that there was a design linkage with the W25 low-yield warhead of the Genie. There is no hard evidence as yet, but the 11 kt yield of the W34 Python would degrade to a figure comparable with the W25 without the gas-boosting.

Historical evidence indicates that these weapons shared a reliability problem, which Hansen attributes to miscalculation of the reaction cross section of tritium in fusion reactions. The weapons were not tested as extensively as some prior models due to a mid-1960s nuclear test moratorium, and the reliability problem was discovered and fixed after the moratorium ended. The flaw was apparently common with the W44 Tsetse primary design.

Characteristics of these weapons are:

Python primary based nuclear weapons
Model	Max yield (kt)	Diameter	Length	Weight
B28	1,450	22 in (56 cm)	170 in (4.3 m)	2,300 lb (1,000 kg)
W-28	1,450	20 in (51 cm)	60 in (1.5 m)	1,725 lb (782 kg)
W-40	10	18 in (46 cm)	32 in (0.81 m)	385 lb (175 kg)
W-49	1,440	20 in (51 cm)	58 in (1.5 m)	1,610 lb (730 kg)
W-34	11	17 in (43 cm)	32 in (0.81 m)	320 lb (150 kg)
Possible family members
W25	1.7	17.4 in (44 cm)	26.6 in (0.68 m)	221 lb (100 kg)

== See also ==
- List of nuclear weapons
- Robin primary
