= W40 (nuclear warhead) =

American nuclear warhead

The W40 nuclear warhead was an American fusion-boosted fission nuclear warhead developed in the late 1950s and which saw service from 1959 to 1972.

The W40 design was reportedly the common Python primary or fission core used by the US B28 nuclear bomb, W28 nuclear warhead, and W49 nuclear warhead.

The W40 was 18 in (460 mm) in diameter, 32 in (810 mm) long, and weighed around 385 lb (175 kg). It had a design yield of 10 kilotons.

The W40 was used in the MGM-18 Lacrosse surface to surface missile (SRBM) and CIM-10 Bomarc surface to air missile (SAM).

The Bomarc warhead was lethal to a medium bomber aircraft up to about one kilometer. The warheads were mounted to the missiles for 90 day intervals, after which they underwent periodic inspection and maintenance.

The first production device was made in January 1959, with production starting in June, withdrawal in August due to a significant safety issue, and re-release in September with a temporary fix. A one-point safety problem was discovered in 1960 and a W40 mod 2 with a fix was developed and sent out in December 1963.

== See also ==
- List of nuclear weapons
