= Maritime patrol aircraft =

Military aircraft designed to reconnoiter oceans and other bodies of water

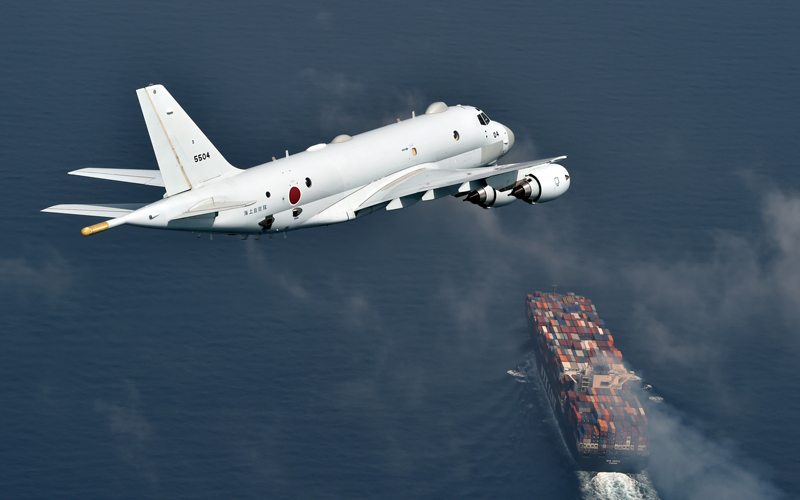
A Japanese Kawasaki P-1 conducting operations over a merchant ship

A Maritime Patrol Aircraft (MPA), also known as a patrol aircraft, maritime reconnaissance aircraft, maritime surveillance aircraft, or by the older American term patrol bomber, is a fixed-wing aircraft designed to operate for long durations over water in maritime patrol roles — in particular Anti-Submarine Warfare (ASW), Anti-Surface Warfare (ASuW or ASUW), and Search and Rescue (SAR).

In addition to dedicated airframes, mid-size and large business jets have been modified for MPA missions, offering rapid deployment, extended range, long endurance, and lower life-cycle costs.

Among other maritime surveillance resources, such as satellites, ships, unmanned aerial vehicles (UAVs) and helicopters, the MPA is an important asset. To perform ASW operations, MPAs typically carry air-deployable sonar buoys as well as torpedoes and are usually capable of extended flight at low altitudes.

== History ==
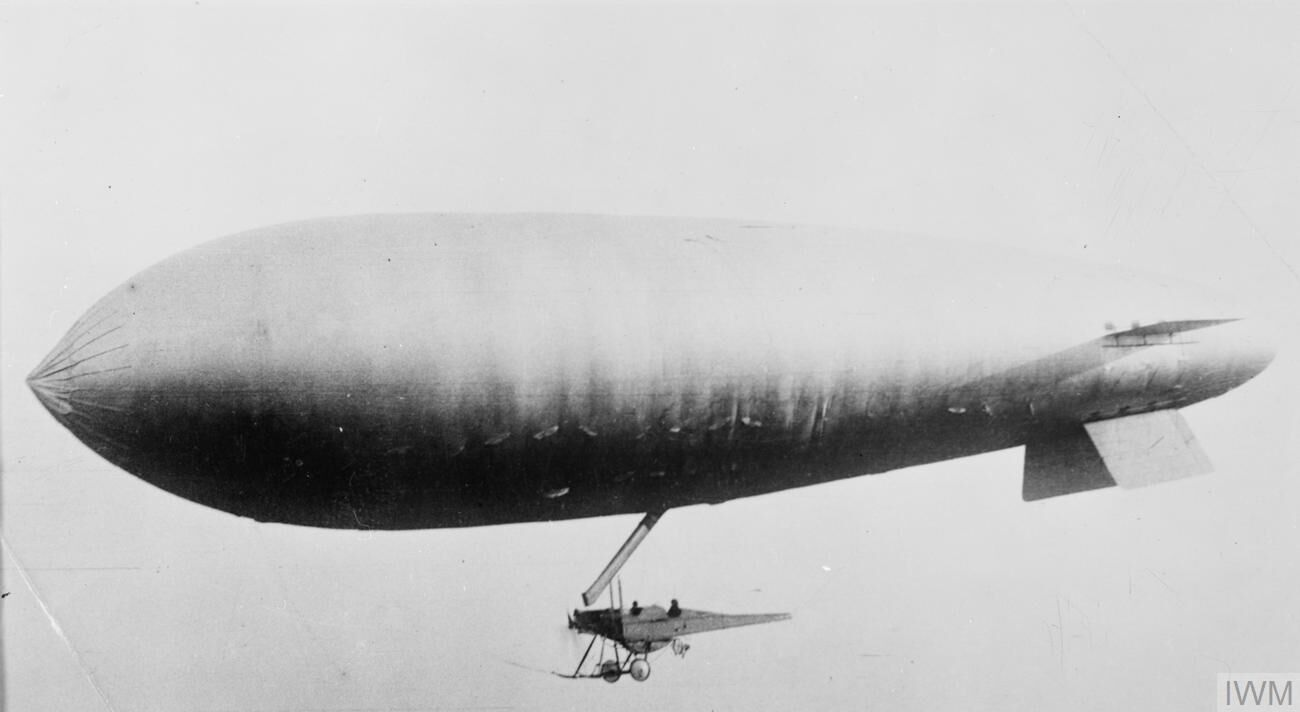
SS class airship

=== First World War ===
The first aircraft that would now be identified as maritime patrol aircraft were flown by the Royal Naval Air Service and the French Aéronautique Maritime during the First World War, primarily on anti-submarine patrols. France, Italy and Austria-Hungary used large numbers of smaller patrol aircraft for the Mediterranean, Adriatic and other coastal areas while the Germans and British fought over the North Sea. At first, blimps and zeppelins were the only aircraft capable of staying aloft for the longer ten hour patrols whilst carrying a useful payload while shorter-range patrols were mounted with landplanes such as the Sopwith 1½ Strutter. A number of specialized patrol balloons were built, particularly by the British, including the SS class airship of which 158 were built including subtypes.

As the conflict continued, numerous aircraft were developed specifically for the role, including small flying boats such as the FBA Type C, as well as large floatplanes such as the Short 184, or flying boats such as the Felixstowe F.3. Developments of the Felixstowe served with the Royal Air Force until the mid 20s, and with the US Navy as the Curtiss F5L and Naval Aircraft Factory PN whose developments saw service until 1938. During the war, Dornier did considerable pioneering work in all aluminium aircraft structures while working for Luftschiffbau Zeppelin and built four large patrol flying boats, the last of which, the Zeppelin-Lindau Rs.IV, influenced development elsewhere resulting in the replacement of wooden hulls with metal ones, such as on the Short Singapore. The success of long range patrol aircraft led to the development of fighters specifically designed to intercept them, such as the Hansa-Brandenburg W.29.

=== Second World War ===
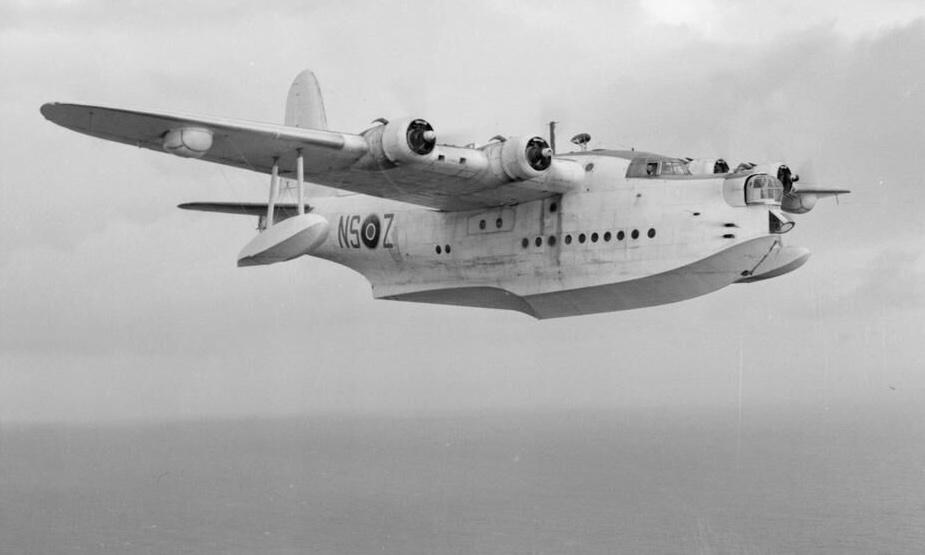
British Short Sunderland maritime reconnaissance flying boat

Many of the Second World War patrol airplanes were converted from either bombers or airliners, such as the Lockheed Hudson which started out as the Lockheed Model 14 Super Electra, as well as older biplane designs such as the Supermarine Stranraer, which had begun to be replaced by monoplanes just before the outbreak of war. The British in particular used obsolete bombers to supplement purpose-built aircraft for maritime patrol, such as the Vickers Wellington and Armstrong-Whitworth Whitley, while the US relegated the Douglas B-18 Bolo to the same role until better aircraft became available. Blimps were widely used by the United States Navy, especially in the warmer and calmer latitudes of the Caribbean Sea, the Bahamas, Bermuda, the Gulf of Mexico, Puerto Rico, Trinidad, and later the Azores.

A number of special-purpose aircraft were also used in the conflict, including the American-made twin-engine Consolidated PBY Catalina flying boats, and the large, four-engine British Short Sunderland flying boats of the Allies. In the Pacific theatre, the Catalina was gradually superseded by the longer-ranged Martin PBM Mariner flying boat. For the Axis powers, there were the long-range Japanese Kawanishi H6K and Kawanishi H8K flying boats, and the German Blohm & Voss BV 138 diesel-engined trimotor flying boat, as well as the converted Focke-Wulf Fw 200 Condor airliner landplane.

To finally close the Mid-Atlantic gap, or "Black Gap", a space in which Axis submarines could prey on Allied shipping out of reach of MPAs, the British Royal Air Force, the Royal Canadian Air Force, and the US Army Air Forces introduced the American Consolidated B-24 Liberator bomber, which had a very long range for the era. The B-24 was also used at the basis for the PB4Y-2 Privateer, a dedicated MPA variant adopted in large numbers by the US Navy, which saw service late on in the Pacific theatre.

During the conflict, there were several developments in air-to-surface-vessel radar and sonobuoys, which enhanced the ability of aircraft to find and destroy submarines, especially at night and in poor weather. Another area of advancement was the adoption of increasingly effective camouflage schemes, which led to the widespread adoption of white paint schemes in the Atlantic to reduce the warning available to surfaced U-boats, while US Navy aircraft transitioned from an upper light blue-gray and lower white to an all-over dark blue due to the increasing threat of Japanese forces at night-time.

=== Cold War era ===
In the decades following the Second World War, the MPA missions were partially taken over by aircraft derived from civilian airliners. These had range and performance factors better than most of the wartime bombers. The latest jet-powered bombers of the 1950s did not have the endurance needed for long, overwater patrolling, and they did not have the low loitering speeds necessary for antisubmarine operations. The main threat to NATO maritime supremacy throughout the 1960s, 1970s, and the 1980s was Soviet Navy and Warsaw Pact submarines. These were countered by the NATO fleets, the NATO patrol planes mentioned above, and by sophisticated underwater listening systems. These span the so-called "GIUK Gap" of the North Atlantic that extends from Greenland to Iceland, to the Faroe Islands, to Scotland in the United Kingdom. Air bases for NATO patrol planes have also been located in these areas: U.S. Navy and Canadian aircraft based in Greenland, Iceland, and Newfoundland; British aircraft based in Scotland and Northern Ireland; and Norwegian, Dutch, and German aircraft based in their home countries.

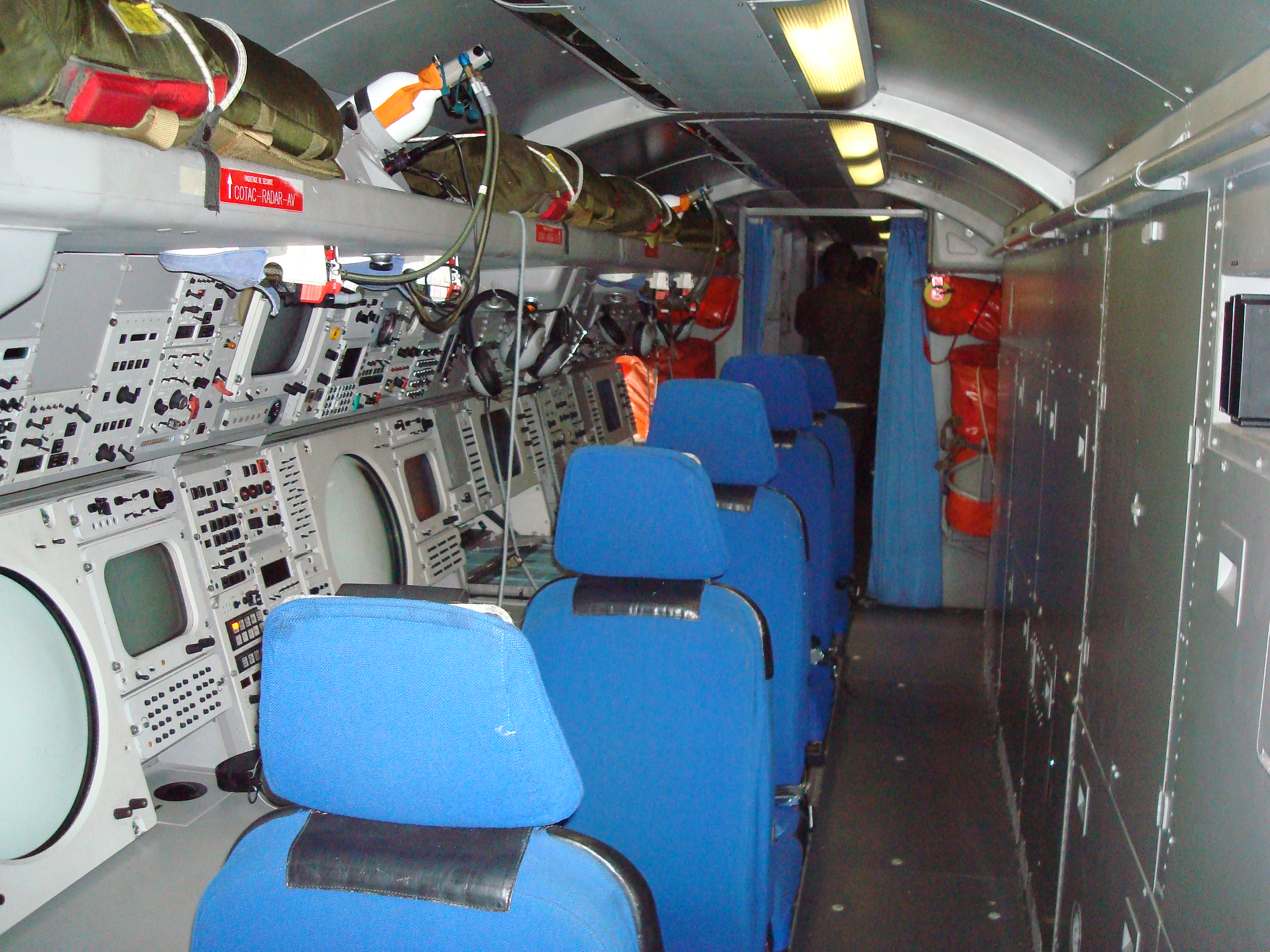
Interior of a French Navy Breguet Atlantic

During the late 1940s, the RAF introduced the Avro Shackleton – a specialised MPA derivative of the Avro Lancaster bomber – in anticipation of a rapid expansion of the Soviet Navy's submarine force. An improved model of the Shackleton, the MR 3, was introduced, featuring various structural improvements, along with homing torpedoes and Mk 101 Lulu nuclear depth bombs. During the late 1960s, a jet-powered replacement in the form of the Hawker Siddeley Nimrod, a derivation of the De Havilland Comet airliner, begun to be introduced. During the 2000s, an improved model, the BAE Systems Nimrod MRA4, was in development, but was cancelled and eventually substituted for by the Boeing P-8 Poseidon.

The U.S. Navy flew a mixture of MPAs, including the land-based Lockheed P2V Neptune (P2V) and the carrier-based Grumman S-2 Tracker. During the 1970s, the P2V was entirely replaced by the Lockheed P-3 Orion, which remained in service into the early twenty-first century.

The P-3, powered by four turboprop engines, is derived from the 1950s era Lockheed Electra airliner. In addition to their ASW and SAR capabilities, most P-3Cs have been modified to carry Harpoon and Maverick missiles for attacking surface ships. American P-3s were formerly armed with the Lulu nuclear depth charge for ASW, but those were removed from the arsenal and scrapped decades ago. Produced in United States, Japan and Canada, the P-3 has been operated by the air forces and navies of United States, Japan, Canada, Australia, Iran, Brazil, Germany, the Netherlands, New Zealand, Norway, Spain, and Taiwan. The Canadian version is called the CP-140 Aurora. Beginning in 2013, the P-3 was replaced in U.S. service and that of several other countries by the Boeing P-8 Poseidon, a derivative of the Boeing 737 airliner.

During the 1960s, in response to North Atlantic Treaty Organization (NATO) issuing a Request for Proposals (RFP) for a new MPA, the Breguet 1150 Atlantic was developed by a French-led multinational consortium, Société d'Étude et de Construction de Breguet Atlantic (SECBAT). Operators of the type include the French Navy, the German Navy, the Italian Air Force, the Pakistan Navy, and the Royal Netherlands Navy. During the 1980s, an updated version, the Atlantic Nouvelle Génération or Atlantique 2, with new equipment and avionics was introduced, which included a new radar, sonar processor, forward-looking infrared camera turret, and the ability to carry the Exocet anti-shipping missile. By 2005, French manufacturer Dassault Aviation had decided to terminate marketing efforts for the Atlantic, promoting a MPA variant of the Dassault Falcon 900 corporate jet instead.

Japan has developed multiple purpose-designed MPAs during this period. The Shin Meiwa PS-1 flying boat was designed to meet a Japanese requirement for a new ASW platform. A modernised derivative of the PS-1, the ShinMaywa US-2 amphibian, was introduced during the early twenty-first century to succeed the PS-1. The land-based Kawasaki P-1 was introduced during the 2010s by the Japan Maritime Self-Defense Force (JMSDF) as a replacement for the aging P-3C Orion.

Both the Royal Australian Air Force and the Royal Australian Navy met their early postwar MPA needs via a stretched-fuselage modification of the Avro Lincoln bomber. However, the type was soon supplemented and eventually replaced by new aircraft, such as the P2V and later the P-3C, which later became the sole ASW type operated by the service.

The Soviet Union developed the Ilyushin Il-38 from a civilian airliner. Similarly, the Royal Canadian Air Force derived the Canadair CP-107 Argus from a British airliner, the Bristol Britannia. The Argus was superseded by the CP-140 Aurora, derived from the Lockheed Electra.

Since the end of the Cold War, the threat of a large-scale submarine attack is a remote one, and many of the air forces and navies have been downsizing their fleets of patrol planes. Those still in service are still used for search-and-rescue, counter-smuggling, antipiracy, antipoaching of marine life, the enforcement of the exclusive economic zones, and enforcement of the laws of the seas.

== Armament and countermeasures ==
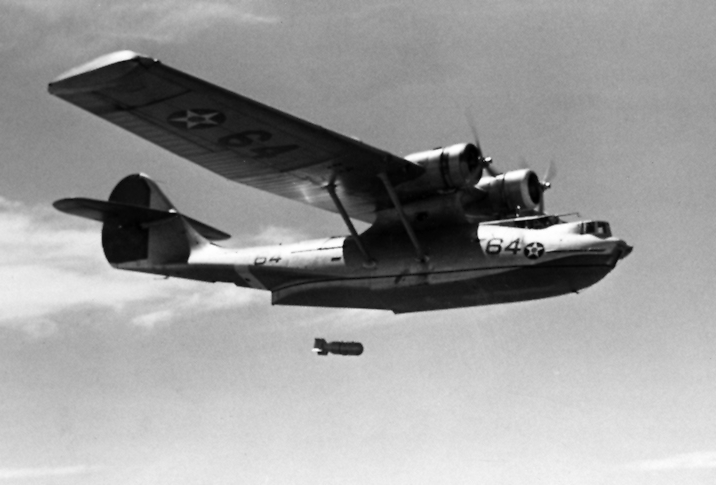
Pre–World War II Consolidated PBY Catalina dropping a depth charge

The earliest patrol aircraft carried bombs and machine guns. Between the wars the British experimented with equipping their patrol aircraft with the COW 37 mm gun. During World War II, depth charges that could be set to detonate at specific depths, and later when in proximity with large metal objects replaced anti-submarine bombs that detonated on contact. Patrol aircraft also carried defensive armament which was necessary when patrolling areas close to enemy territory such as Allied operations in the Bay of Biscay targeting U-boats starting out from their base.

As a result of Allied successes with patrol aircraft against U-boats, the Germans introduced U-flak (submarines equipped with more antiaircraft weaponry) to escort U-boats out of base and encouraged commanders to remain on the surface and fire back at attacking craft rather than trying to escape by diving. However, U-flak was short-lived, as opposing pilots adapted their tactics. Equipping submarines with radar warning receivers and the snorkel made them harder to find.

To counter the German long-range patrol aircraft that targeted merchant convoys, the Royal Navy introduced the "CAM ship", which was a merchant vessel equipped with a lone fighter plane which could be launched once to engage the enemy planes. Later, the small escort carriers of WWII became available to cover the deep oceans, and the land air bases in the Azores became available in mid-1943 from Portugal.

As technology progressed the bombs and depth charges were supplemented with Acoustic torpedoes that could detect, follow and then explode against an enemy submarine. The US Navy began fielding the Mark 24 mine in 1943, labelled as a mine as a security measure. It sank 37 Axis submarines during the war.

The Cold War era saw the introduction of the nuclear depth bomb, a depth charge with a nuclear warhead that raised the probability of a kill against a submarine to a near-certainty as long as detonation occurred.

While anti-submarine warfare is the main role of patrol aircraft, their large payload capability has seen them fitted for various weaponry outside their nominal role. The Lockheed P-3 Orion was fitted with underwing pylons that could carry a variety of common American weapons, including the AGM-84 Harpoon anti-ship missile, the air-to-ground AGM-65 Maverick, as many as ten of the CBU-100 Cluster Bomb, rocket pods, sea mines, and the standard issue Mark 80 general purpose bombs.

The Royal Air Force's Hawker Siddeley Nimrod was fitted with AIM-9 Sidewinder missiles in 1982 during the Falklands War in order for it to be able to attack any Argentine Air Force patrol planes they might encounter.

== Sensors ==
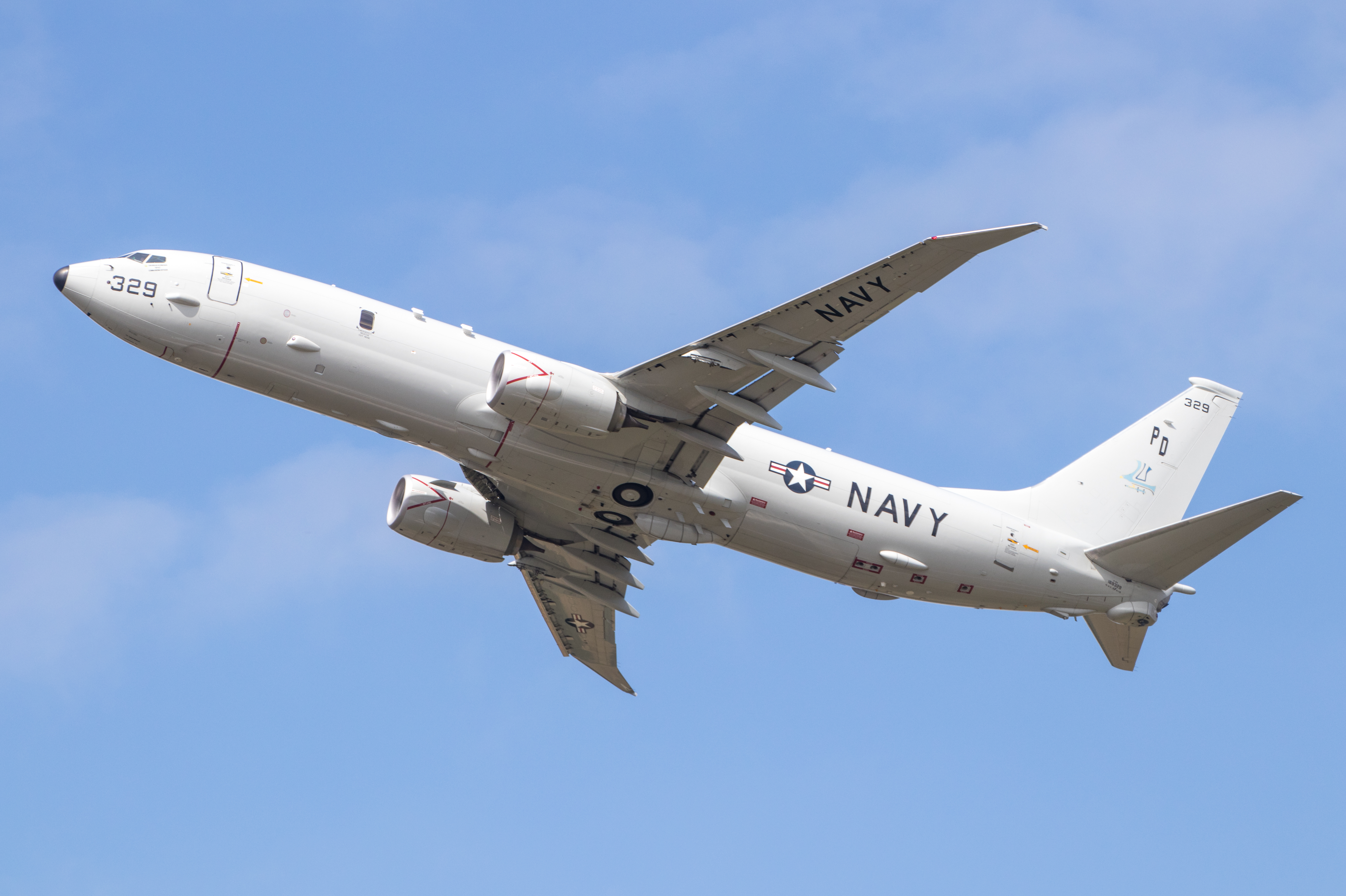
US Navy P-8 Poseidon

Maritime patrol aircraft are typically fitted with a wide range of sensors:

- Radar to detect surface shipping movements. Radar can also detect a submarine snorkel or periscope, and the wake it creates.
- Magnetic anomaly detector (MAD) to detect the iron in a submarine's hull. The MAD sensor is typically mounted on an extension from the tail or is trailed behind the aircraft on a cable to minimize interference from the metal in the rest of the aircraft;
- Sonobuoys – self-contained sonar transmitter/receivers dropped into the water to transmit data back to the aircraft for analysis;
- ELINT sensors to monitor communications and radar emissions;
- Infrared cameras (sometimes referred to as FLIR for forward looking infrared) for detecting exhaust streams and other sources of heat and are useful in monitoring shipping movements and fishing activity.
- Visual inspection using the aircrew's eyes, in some cases aided by searchlights or flares.

A modern military maritime patrol aircraft typically carries a dozen or so crew members, including relief flight crews, to effectively operate the equipment for 12 hours or more at a time.

=== Bizjet-based maritime patrol aircraft ===
In February 2015, Elta Systems (a subsidiary of Israel Aerospace Industries) unveiled the ELI-3360, the first generation of armed, business-jet–based maritime patrol aircraft. The program adapts mid-size business jets (e.g. Gulfstream G280, Bombardier Challenger 650) and large-body platforms (e.g. Bombardier Global 6500), offering rapid deployment, reduced life-cycle costs, extended range, and long endurance.

All variants employ Elta's open-architecture Multi-Mission Management System to host interchangeable payloads. Standard equipment includes: ELM-2022 maritime patrol radar or its ELM-2025 C-Catcher AESA multi-mode radar for maritime, ground and aerial surveillance, capable of detecting targets from large warships to small speedboats;

- Electro-Optic/Infra-Red (EO/IR) turret for day/night imaging;
- Automatic Identification System (AIS) transceiver;
- Search and Rescue Direction Finder (SAR-DF).

Optional mission kits enable:

- Signals Intelligence (SIGINT)antennas and processing;
- Acoustic sensor suite for anti-submarine warfare;
- Weapon stations for lightweight torpedoes and air-to-surface missiles;
- Self-protection systems.

As of 2024, operators include maritime forces in Europe, Latin America and the Asia-Pacific region.
