= W34 (nuclear warhead) =

American nuclear warhead

- Type: Nuclear weapon
- Place of origin: United States

Production history
- Designer: Los Alamos Scientific Laboratory
- Produced: 1958-1962
- No. built: 3,200

Specifications
- Mass: 141 to 145 kilograms (311 to 320 lb)
- Length: 860 millimetres (34 in)
- Diameter: 430 millimetres (17 in)
- Blast yield: 11 kilotons of TNT (46 TJ)

The W34 was an American nuclear bomb developed and deployed during the mid-1960s.

Dimensions of the W34 are 430 millimetres (17 in) diameter and 860 millimetres (34 in) long. The device core weighs 141 to 145 kilograms (311 to 320 lb) depending on model. Yield of the W34 was 11 kilotons.

The W34 was deployed in several applications: Mark 101 Lulu nuclear depth bomb, the Mark 45 ASTOR torpedo and the Mark 105 Hotpoint nuclear bomb.

The Mk 101 Lulu was manufactured from 1958, and deployed until final decommissioning in 1971. A total of 2,000 were produced. The Mark 45 ASTOR was produced from 1958 and used until 1976; 600 ASTOR were produced. The Mark 105 bomb was produced from 1958 until 1965, with 600 having been produced.

The design of the W34 has been described as identical to the fission primary of the B28 nuclear bomb by some sources. That would place it in the Python primary family of nuclear weapons. The dimensions and weight of the W34 are consistent with the W40 warhead, which is more solidly identified with the Python primary family of weapons.

== See also ==
- B28 nuclear bomb
- List of nuclear weapons
