= Tsetse (nuclear primary) =

The Tsetse was a small American nuclear bomb developed in the 1950s that was used as the primary in several US thermonuclear bombs and as a small stand-alone weapon of its own.

The Tsetse had a boosted composite core which used 2.25 kg Pu-239, 1.4kg U-235 and 6g tritium. The nominal yield was 10 kilotons. The design was shared with the UK where the anglicised version was known as Tony. The difference between Tsetse and Tony was in the high explosives used. The UK considered the PBX 9404 too shock sensitive and replaced it by EDC-11. This reduced the nominal yield to 8.5 kilotons.

The Tsetse primary was used in the US B43 nuclear bomb, W44 nuclear warhead, W50 nuclear warhead, B57 nuclear bomb, and W59 nuclear warhead, according to researcher Chuck Hansen.

After deployment of the B43 two problems were identified in the primary. In 1961 Los Alamos scientists concluded that the primary was not one point safe under all conditions. A long series of tests was needed to develop a safe version. The second problem was related to tritium aging. To investigate a lifetime extension of the B43 an aged B43 was fired. The test resulted in half the yield. This was quite a shock as it affected not only the B43 but all similar weapons. The solution was to more frequently replenish the tritium supply. This problem was apparently shared by the Python primary designs.

Characteristics of these weapons are:

Tsetse primary based nuclear weapons
Model	Max yield (kt)	Diameter	Length	Weight
B43	1,000	18 in (46 cm)	150–164 in (3.8–4.2 m)	2,060 lb (930 kg)
W44	10	13.75 in (34.9 cm)	25.3 in (0.64 m)	170 lb (77 kg)
W50	400	15.4 in (39 cm)	44 in (1.1 m)	410 lb (190 kg)
B57	20	14.75 in (37.5 cm)	118 in (3.0 m)	490 lb (220 kg)
W59	1,000	16.3 in (41 cm)	47.8 in (1.21 m)	550 lb (250 kg)

Based on this information it can be assumed that the Tsetse design itself corresponds to the size of the W44 warhead, 349-millimetre (13.75 in) diameter and 640-millimetre (25.3 in) long, with a weight of around 77 kilograms (170 lb).

== See also ==
- List of nuclear weapons
- Teller-Ulam design
