= Mk 101 Lulu =

US nuclear depth charge

Mark 101 Lulu
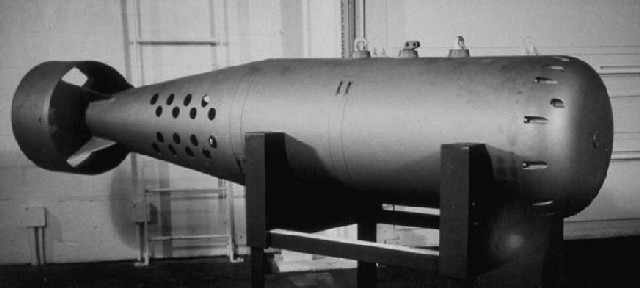
- Mk-101 Lulu NDB (Nuclear Depth Bomb).
- Type: Nuclear weapon
- Place of origin: United States

Production history
- Designer: Los Alamos Scientific Laboratory
- Produced: 1958–1962
- No. built: 2000

Specifications
- Mass: 1,200 pounds (540 kg)
- Length: 7.5 feet (2.3 m)
- Diameter: 18 inches (46 cm)
- Filling: W34 nuclear warhead
- Blast yield: 11 kilotons of TNT (46 TJ)

The Mark 101 Lulu was an airdropped nuclear depth charge developed by the United States Navy and the Atomic Energy Commission during the 1950s.

== History ==
It carried a W34 nuclear warhead, with an explosive yield of about 11 kilotons. It was deployed by the U.S. Navy for the purposes of antisubmarine warfare, in at least five different models, from 1958 through 1971. These nuclear weapons were also stockpiled overseas at the bases of NATO allies, under American military guard and control, for the potential use by maritime patrol planes of NATO. This capability was most notably used at the air base of RAF St. Mawgan in Cornwall by British Avro Shackleton patrol planes and the Royal Netherlands Navy's P-2 Neptune and P-3 Orion patrol planes. Neither the Lulu nor any other kind of nuclear antisubmarine or antiship weapon was ever used in combat by any country.

The Mk-101 "Lulu" started to be replaced by the multipurpose B57 nuclear bomb during the mid-1960s. The B-57 was a bomb that could be used by tactical aircraft against land targets, as well as a nuclear depth charge.

The Mk-101 "Lulu" had a length of 7 ft 6 in (2.29 m), diameter of 1 ft 6 in (46 cm), and weighed 1,200 lb (540 kg). In RAF service for carriage by Shackleton MR2 and MR3 maritime patrol bombers it was known as Bomb, AS, 1200 lb, MC.

The Lulu lacked an important safety/arming device: it had no sensors to detect the freefall from an aircraft that would follow from the depth charge's being intentionally dropped. As a result, if an armed Mk 101 bomb accidentally fell off an aircraft while it was parked on the deck of a warship, and then it rolled overboard, it would detonate at the preset depth.

The weapon's W34 nuclear warhead was also used in several other weapons such as the Mark 45 torpedo and Mk 105 Hotpoint. An Anglicised version, codenamed "Peter", was used as the primary for the thermonuclear Yellow Sun weapon, and with the codename Python in the American B28 nuclear bomb.

== On display ==
A Mark 101 casing is on display at the National Museum of Nuclear Science & History.
