= Mk 105 Hotpoint =

Nuclear bomb

The Mark 105 Hotpoint was an airdropped nuclear bomb developed for the United States Navy using the 11 kiloton W34 warhead. It was developed in the 1950s as the first nuclear bomb purposely designed for laydown delivery (bunker buster) but could also be used for airburst or as a depth charge. The laydown mechanism utilized both a retarding parachute to slow its descent, a nose cone that is ejected by a small explosive charge prior to impact, and a reinforced steel "cookie cutter" nose that absorbs the shock of impact with the ground. Detonation occurred via a time delay system which could be adjusted depending on intended use. The bomb was 8 to 12 feet (2.4 to 3.7 m) long depending on how it was carried, 19 inches (48 cm) in diameter, and weighed 1,700 pounds (770 kg). The bomb was deployed from 1958 to 1965.

== See also ==
- W34 (nuclear warhead)
- Mk 101 Lulu
