= Nuclear depth bomb =

Nuclear weapon for use underwater

A nuclear depth bomb is the nuclear equivalent of a conventional depth charge, and can be used in anti-submarine warfare for attacking submerged submarines. The Royal Navy, Soviet Navy, and United States Navy all had nuclear depth bombs in their arsenals at one point.

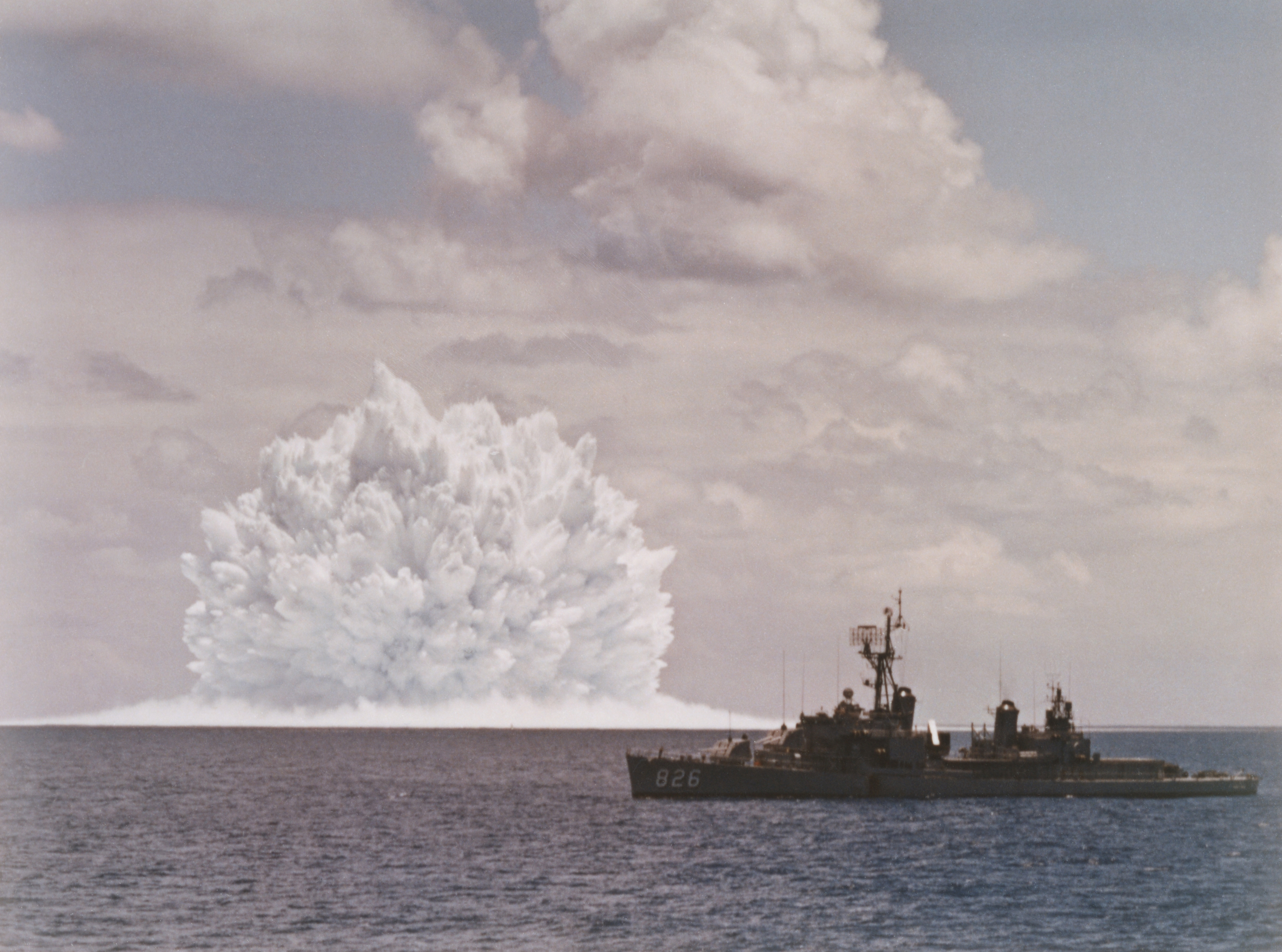
The United States conducted the test Dominic Swordfish of the RUR-5 ASROC nuclear depth bomb off San Diego in 1962.

== Intended use to attack submarines ==
Due to the use of a nuclear warhead of much greater explosive power than that of the conventional depth charge, the nuclear depth bomb considerably increases the likelihood (to the point of near certainty) of the destruction of the attacked submarine.

== Aircraft cleared to use the bomb ==
Some aircraft were cleared for using nuclear depth bombs, such as the P2V Neptune, but none were used against any submarines.

== Variable Yield ==
Because of this much greater power some nuclear depth bombs feature a variable yield, whereby the explosive energy of the device may be varied between a low setting for use in shallow or coastal waters, and a high yield for deep water open-sea use. This is intended to minimise damage to peripheral areas and merchant shipping.

== British use during the Falklands War ==
During the Falklands War, Britain's naval task force carried 31 nuclear depth charges. HMS Hermes had 18, HMS Invincible had 12 and RFA Regent had one by mid-May 1982. The ships were within the "total exclusion zone" imposed by Britain around the Falkland Islands. Details of the number of devices per ship were contained in a file marked "Top Secret Atomic" found at the UK National Archives by media outlet Declassified UK.

== Withdrawn from service along other anti-submarine weapons ==
All nuclear anti-submarine weapons were withdrawn from service by China, France, the Soviet Union, the United Kingdom and the United States in or around 1990. They were replaced by conventional weapons such as the Mk 54 Torpedo that provided ever-increasing accuracy and range as anti-submarine warfare technology improved.

== List of nuclear depth bombs ==
- RPK-6 Vodopad/RPK-7 Veter (1981–present)
- Ikara
- WE.177 (1966–1998)
- Mark 90 nuclear bomb (1952–1960)
- W34 for Mk 101 Lulu (1958–1971)
- W34 for Mk 105 Hotpoint (1958–1965)
- B57 nuclear bomb (1963–1993)
- B90 nuclear bomb (cancelled)
- W44 for RUR-5 ASROC (1961–1989)
- W55 for UUM-44 SUBROC (1964–1989)
- W89 for UUM-125 Sea Lance (cancelled)

== See also ==
- Underwater explosion
- Shock factor
- Nuclear torpedo
