= Red Snow =

British nuclear weapon

Red Snow was a British thermonuclear weapon, based on the US W28 (then called Mark 28) design used in the B28 thermonuclear bomb and AGM-28 Hound Dog missile. The US W28 had yields of 70, 350, 1,100 and 1,450 kilotonnes of TNT (0.29, 1.46, 4.60 and 6.07 PJ) and while Red Snow yields are still classified, declassified British documents indicate the existence of "kiloton Red Snow" and "megaton Red Snow" variants of the weapon, suggesting similar yield options, while other sources have suggested a yield of approximately 1 megatonne of TNT (4.2 PJ).

== Development ==
The Red Snow warhead was developed after a September 1958 decision to adopt the US warhead for British use, following the 1958 US-UK Mutual Defence Agreement. It entered service in 1961, remaining in use until 1972, when it was replaced by the WE.177 bomb. Production numbers are classified, but it is believed that fewer than 150 weapons were produced.

Red Snow was used as both a free-fall bomb and as the warhead of the Blue Steel missile. In the gravity bomb role, it was fitted into the casing of the Yellow Sun weapon, even though the Red Snow warhead was considerably smaller than that of the original Yellow Sun bomb.

The Red Snow physics package was later reduced in size, weight and yield, and fitted with a smaller more modern primary, intended as a Red Beard replacement. Known as Una, this was later reduced in diameter and renamed Ulysses as the physics package intended for the UK warhead on the Skybolt project.

== Design ==
Red Snow used the primary stage Peter, an anglicised version of the US Python device used in the W28. The Peter device contained 2.25 kilograms (5.0 lb) of plutonium and 1.4 kilograms (3.1 lb) of uranium. The kiloton Red Snow contained 1.6 kilograms (3.5 lb) of plutonium, 11 kilograms (24 lb) of uranium, 0.6 kilograms (1.3 lb) of lithium deuteride and 2.49 to 2.54 grams (0.088 to 0.090 oz) of tritium, while in megaton Red Snow all the values stayed the same except the lithium deuteride amount which increased to 16 kilograms (35 lb).

The device was fitted inside weapon cases from the older Yellow Sun weapons. This may have been to simplify crew retraining, simplify integration of the new weapon to existing platforms, or to hide the radical reduction in weapon size.

== See also ==
- Atomic Weapons Establishment
- Rainbow Codes
