= W49 =

US thermonuclear warhead of the 1950s and 60s

W49 warhead
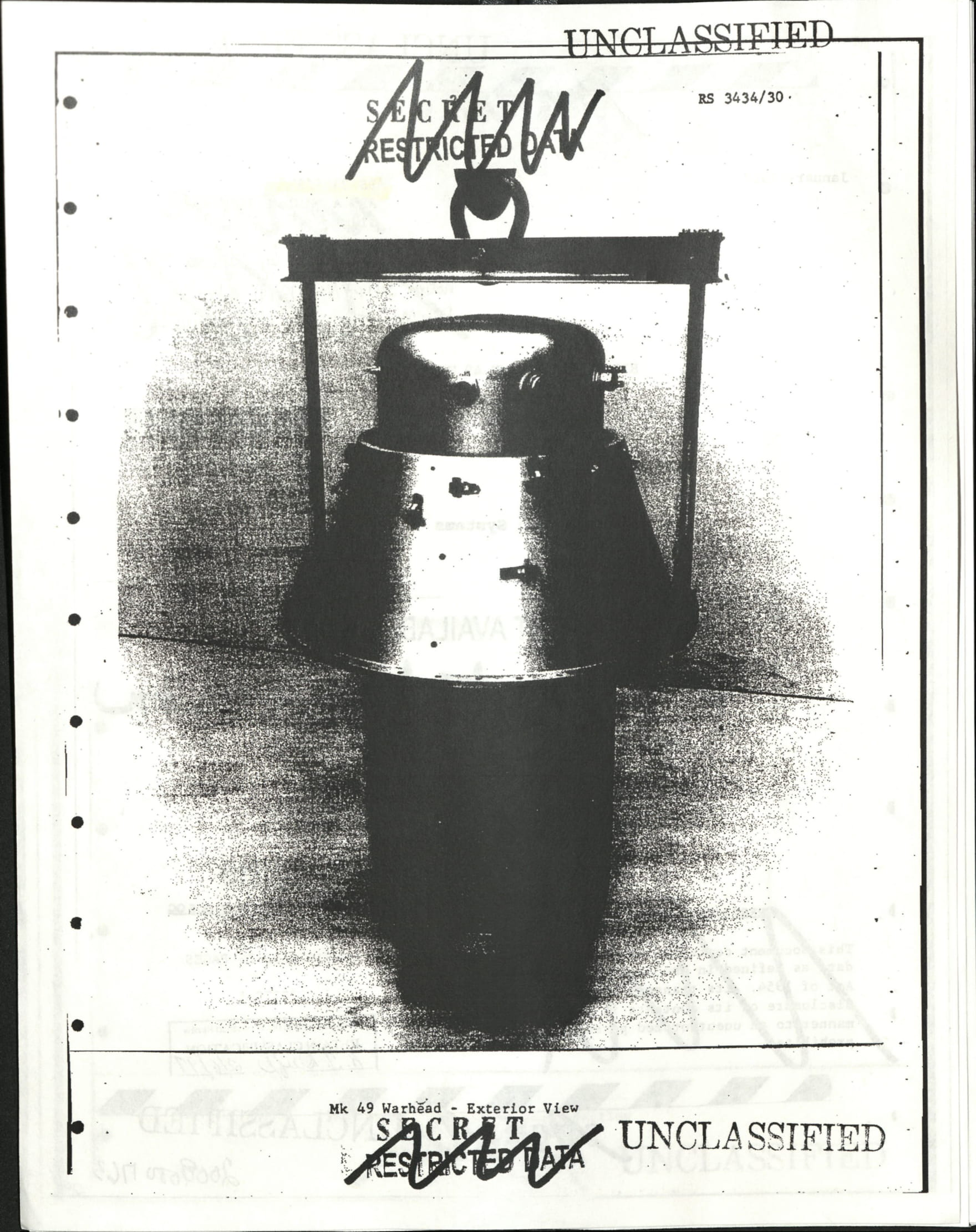
- The W49 warhead
- Type: Nuclear weapon

Service history
- In service: 1958 to 1965
- Used by: United States

Production history
- Designer: Los Alamos National Laboratory
- Variants: 7

Specifications
- Mass: 1,640 pounds (740 kg)
- Detonation mechanism: Contact, airburst
- Blast yield: Y1: 1.1 megatonnes of TNT (4.6 PJ); Y2: 1.45 megatonnes of TNT (6.1 PJ)

The W49 was an American thermonuclear warhead, used on the Thor, Atlas, Jupiter, and Titan I ballistic missile systems. W49 warheads were manufactured starting in 1958 and were in service until 1965, with a few warheads being retained until 1975.

The weapon itself was a Mark 28 Y1 warhead modified for the missile role.

== History ==
=== Initial development of the Mod 0 warhead ===
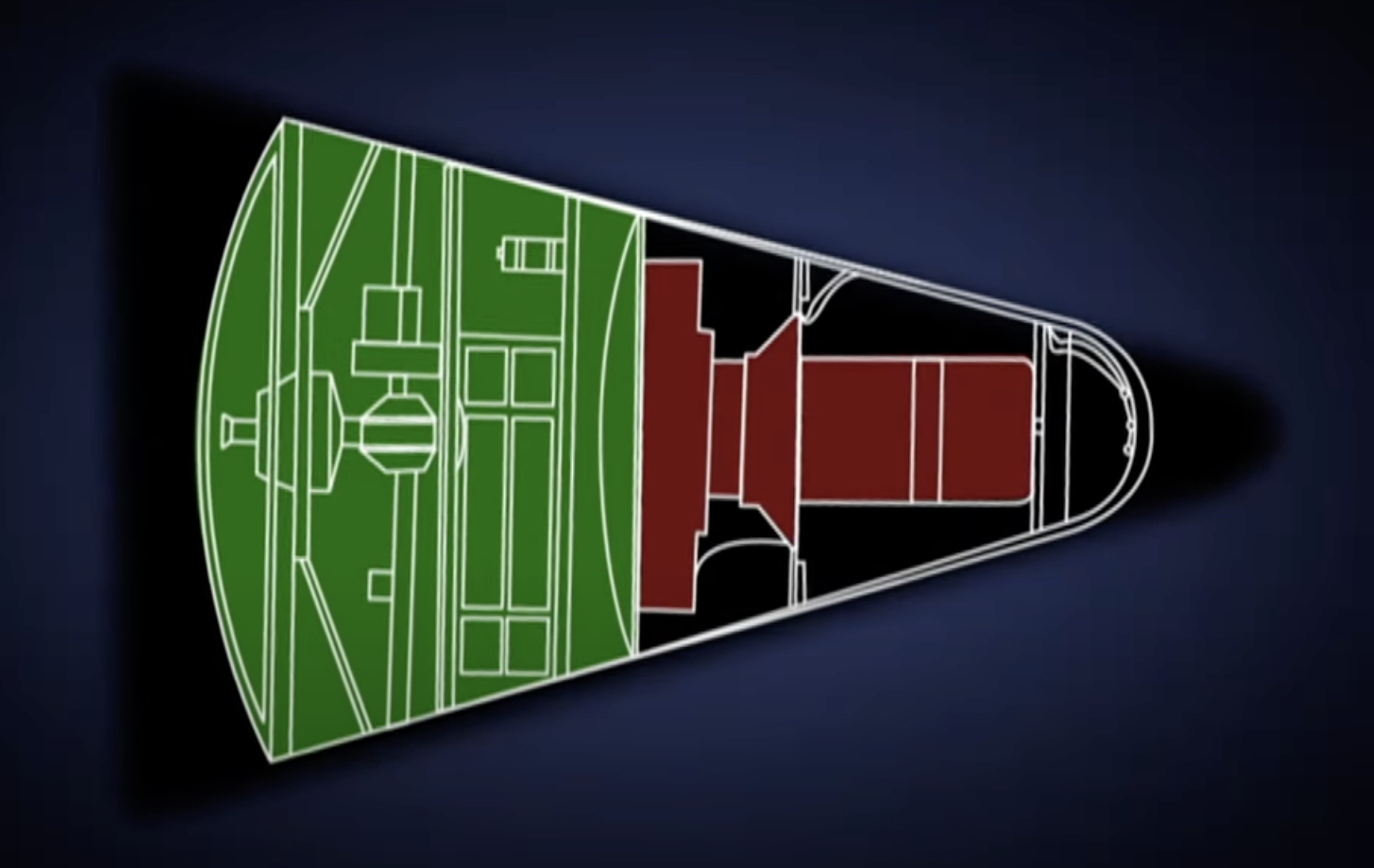
A cross-section diagram showing a W-49 nuclear warhead inside of its re-entry vehicle. The warhead and firing set are shown in red; the fuzing system is shown in green.

Development began in mid-1956 with the need for a warhead for the then in development Thor, Atlas, Jupiter and Titan missiles. This led to work being performed to develop the XW-35 and XW-35-X1 warheads, with the high-yield, improved X1 to enter service approximately one year after the XW-35. However, development of these missiles was delayed and it became apparent to designers that the planned service entry date for the XW-35-X1 would now be the same as the missiles (except for Jupiter), leading to the cancellation of the XW-35 and the decision to fit XW-28 warheads to Jupiter as an interim warhead until the XW-35-X1 entered service.

In December 1957, the stockpile entry date for the XW-35-X1 slipped, leading to the decision to also fit Atlas, Titan and Thor with the interim warhead, now called the XW49. The warhead was a Mark 28Y1 warhead which was converted by removing internal power as this would be supplied by the warhead adaption kit. It was felt that this warhead would be available by 1958. The design was sealed and pressurized, and no component replacement would be permitted in the field; the warhead only needing periodic electrical and pressure testing.

The Mark 49 Y1 Mod 0 was designed released in March 1958 and entered the stockpile in September 1958. For still classified reasons, the WX-35-X1 was cancelled in June or July of that year.

The Mark 49 Y1 Mod 0 was 20 inches (510 mm) in diameter and 54.2 inches (1,380 mm) in length. The warhead only needed pressure testing at 30 day intervals and electrical testing after mating the warhead to the reentry vehicle. The warhead was the first to use a rotary chopper inverter/converter to convert the 28 volts DC supplied to the weapon to 2200 volts DC for the X-unit's capacitor bank. The warhead had both air-burst and contact-burst fuzing options, and the boosting gas system was mounted inside the pressurized portion of the warhead.

The Mark 49 Y2 Mod 0 warhead was design released in July 1959.

=== Mod 1, 2 and 3 warheads ===
The Mark 49 Mod 1 warhead was only different from the Mod 0 in that it incorporated an inertial environmental sensing device that would prevent arming of the warhead until it sensed a reentry environment. This modification was made due to concerns about accidental detonation caused by electrical or procedural malfunctions and errors, and the risk of sabotage. The request for this modification was approved in October 1958. The modification asked that the sensor be actuated as late as possible in flight and that it be located in the warhead in such a way that access to the device would be difficult and time consuming, as to prevent sabotage. Design release for both the Y1 and Y2 warheads was made in June 1959 and was retrofitted to Mod 0 warheads starting in October 1959.

The Mark 49 Mod 2 warhead was cancelled partway into its development. W49 Mods 0 through 2 were internally initiated weapons but at this time it was decided that future warheads would be externally initiated. The Mod 2 requirement was replaced by the Mod 4.

A decision was made in November 1959 that reactor products needed to be conserved. Internal initiation, using a modulated neutron initiator, required Polonium-210 (^{210}Po), a highly radioactive element. With its short half-life of 138.376 days, ^{210}Po initiators required regular replacement and a steady stream of reactor-made ^{210}Po. The alternative is external initiation, using a pulsed neutron generator containing a mixture of deuterium and tritium gas. The device is a small particle accelerator that fuses deuterium and tritium ions together to produce neutrons when electricity is supplied to the device.

Mark 49 Mod 3 production was started in March 1960 by retrofitting Mark 49 Mod 1 warheads. New production of Mark 49 Mod 3 warheads began in June 1960.

=== Mod 4, 5 and 6 warheads ===
For use on Jupiter, it was initially desired that the missile's reentry vehicle use ablation to cool the reentry vehicle during reentry instead of a heat sink reentry vehicle used on the Thor, Atlas and Titan. But by late 1958 it was decided that all of the missiles would be fitted with ablation reentry vehicles. This required a redesign of the Mark 49 Mod 0 warhead, the XW-49-X1. By the time the warhead entered production in April 1960, it also incorporated the firing set from the Mod 1 warhead.

The Mark 49 Mod 4 only came in the Y2 yield option, was 2.1 inches (53 mm) longer than the original warhead, and weighed 1,640 pounds (740 kg) and 1,732 pounds (786 kg) without and with ablative material respectively. Production was completed by October 1960.

In April 1962 it was requested that a permissive device be fitted to Jupiter missiles to prevent unauthorized detonation. The modification was designed released in September 1962, producing the Mark 49 Mod 5 by converting Mod 3 warheads. The design consisted of a replacement inertial switch pack and new two-piece warhead pressure cover, and increased warhead weight by 12 pounds (5.4 kg).

The final Mark 49 warhead modification was requested in December 1963. The modification consisted of converting a number of Mark 49 Y2 Mod 3 warheads by adding a self-destruct to the warheads to create the Mark 49 Mod 6. These weapons were used in Program 437, an anti-satellite weapon system based on the Thor missile.

== Yields ==
The initial W49 Y1 was derived from the B28 Y1 bomb which had a yield of 1.1 megatonnes of TNT (4.6 PJ). Other sources give the yield as 1.45 megatonnes of TNT (6.1 PJ), the same as the B28 Y5 bomb. This may be the Y2 warhead yield.

== See also ==
- List of nuclear weapons
- Starfish Prime
