= B57 nuclear bomb =

United States Tactical, Free fall, Nuclear Weapon

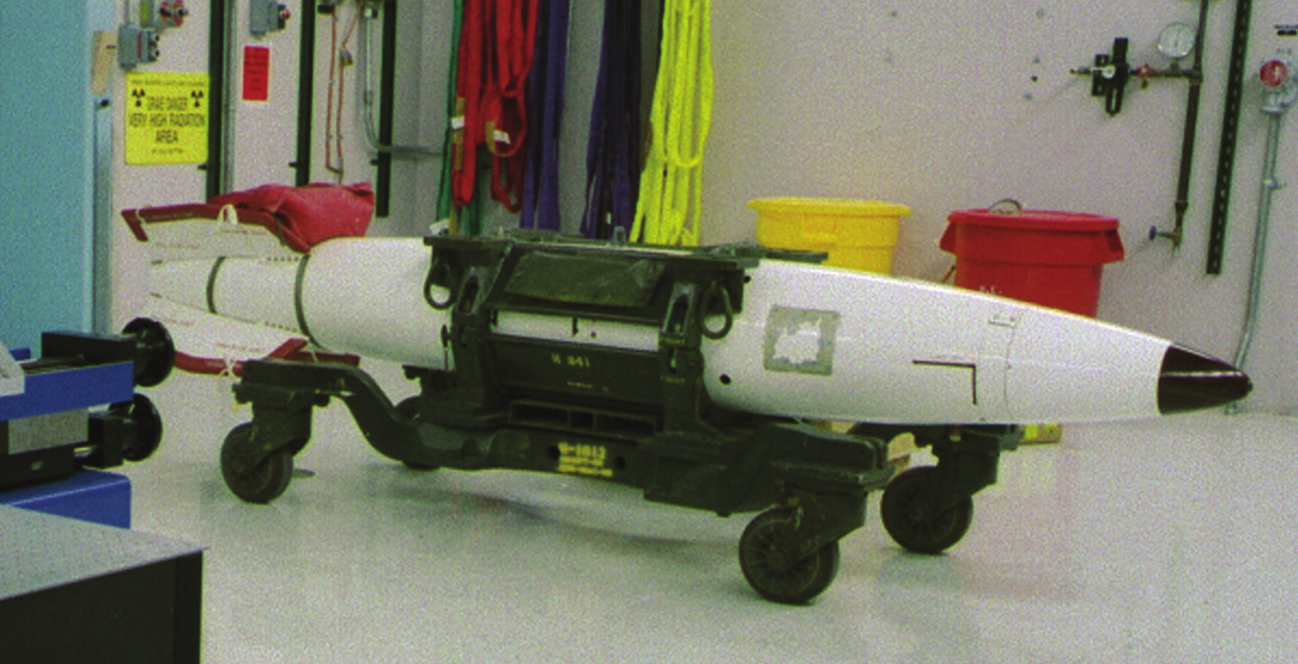
B57 nuclear bomb

The B57 nuclear bomb was a tactical nuclear weapon developed by the United States during the Cold War.

Development began at the Los Alamos National Laboratory in 1960 to meet a requirement for a multi-purpose weapon, suitable for use as a nuclear depth charge or a nuclear bomb against ground targets. Entering production in 1963 as the Mk 57, the bomb was designed to be dropped from high-speed tactical aircraft. It had a streamlined casing to withstand supersonic flight. It was 3 m (9 ft 10 in) long, with a diameter of about 37.5 cm (14.75 in). Basic weight was approximately 227 kilograms (500 lbs).

Some versions of the B57 were equipped with a parachute retarder (a 3.8 m/12.5 ft diameter nylon/kevlar ribbon parachute) to slow the weapon's descent, allowing the aircraft to escape the blast (or to allow the weapon to survive impact with the ground in laydown mode) at altitudes as low as 15 m (50 ft). Various fuzing modes were available, including a hydrostatic fuze for use as a depth charge for anti-submarine use.

The B57 was produced in six versions (mods) with explosive yields ranging from 5 to 20 kilotons. Mod 0 was 5 kt, Mod 1 and Mod 2 were 10 kt, Mod 3 and Mod 4 were 15 kt, and Mod 5 was 20 kt. The depth bomb version of the B57, for the U.S. Navy, replaced the Mk 101 Lulu and had selectable yield up to 10 kt.

The B57 used the Tsetse primary design for its core design, shared with several other mid- and late-1950s designs.

The B57 was produced from 1963 to 1967. After 1968, the weapon became known as the B57 rather than the Mk 57. 3,100 weapons were built, the last of which was retired in June 1993.

The B57 could be deployed by most U.S. fighter, bomber and Navy antisubmarine warfare and patrol aircraft (S-3 Viking and P-3 Orion), and by some U.S. Navy helicopters including the SH-3 Sea King and SH-60F Seahawk. The B57 was also deployed with Canada's CF-104s in Germany, and the Royal Air Force's Nimrod from RAF St Mawgan and RAF Kinloss in the United Kingdom and Malta in the Mediterranean.

== See also ==
- Tsetse primary
- WE.177 - British counterpart
- List of nuclear weapons
