= B28 nuclear bomb =

US Nuclear bomb

B28
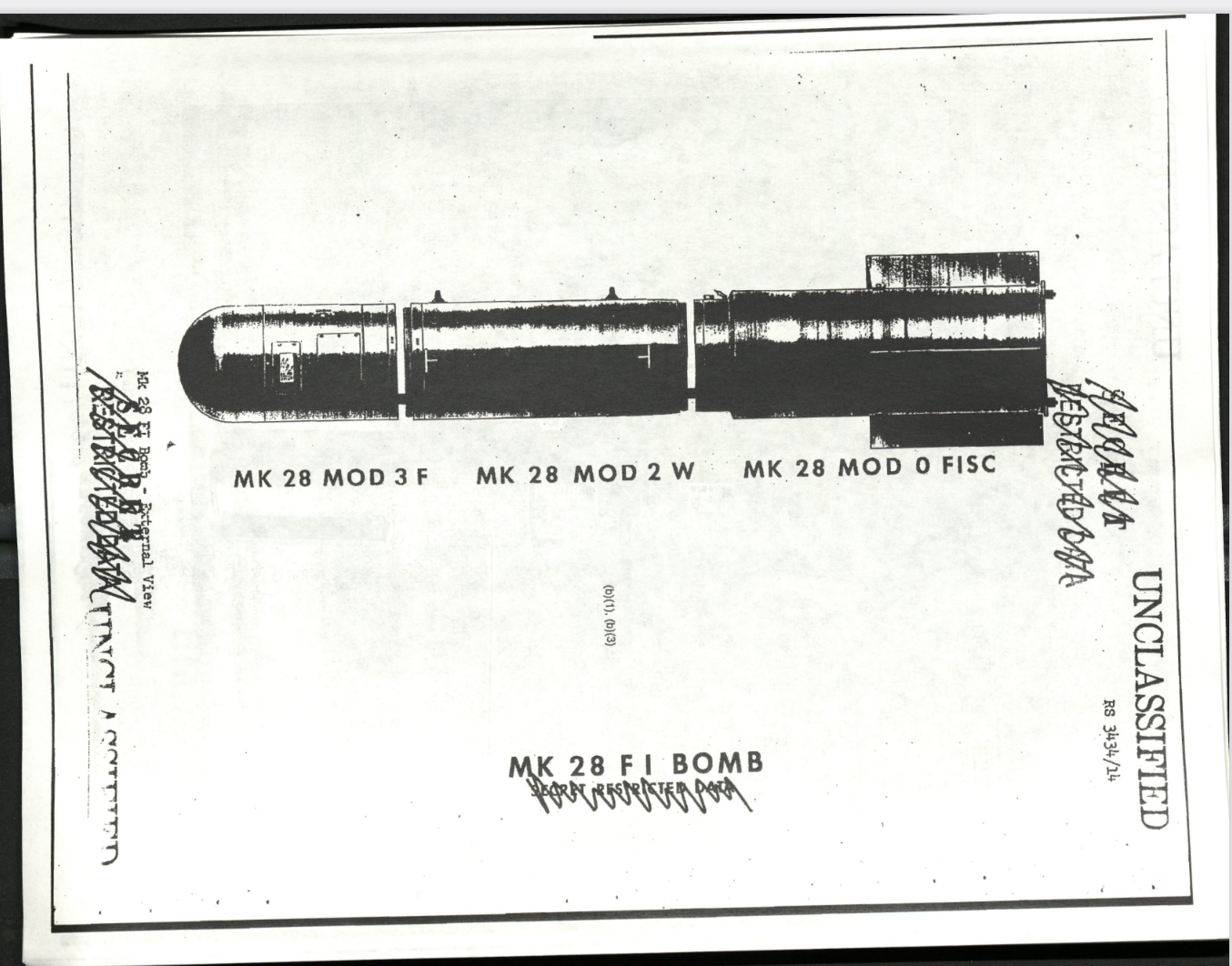
- Diagram of the B28FI bomb.
- Type: Nuclear bomb

Service history
- Used by: United States

Production history
- Designed: 1954 to 1958 (EX and IN), 1955 to 1958 (RE), 1958 to 1960 (RI) and 1959 to 1962 (FI)
- Produced: Started 1958 (EX and IN), 1959 (RE), 1960 (RI) and 1962 (FI), ended 1966.
- No. built: ~4,500

Specifications
- Blast yield: 70 to 1,450 kilotonnes of TNT (290 to 6,070 TJ)

The B28, originally Mark 28, was a thermonuclear bomb carried by U.S. tactical fighter bombers, attack aircraft and bomber aircraft. From 1962 to 1972 under the NATO nuclear weapons sharing program, American B28s also equipped six Europe-based Canadian CF-104 squadrons known as the RCAF Nuclear Strike Force. It was also supplied for delivery by UK-based Royal Air Force Valiant and Canberra aircraft assigned to NATO under the command of SACEUR. In addition, certain U.S. Navy carrier based attack aircraft such as the A3D (later A-3B) Skywarrior, A4D (later A-4) Skyhawk, and A3J (later A-5A) Vigilante were equipped to carry the B28. The UK's Red Snow warhead was a modified B28, which saw use in a number of roles.

== Production history ==
=== Initial development of the IN and EX weapons ===
During the design of the TX-15 in 1953 it became evident to designers that massive reductions in size and weight of thermonuclear weapons were possible. In November 1954 the TX-Theta Committee proposed the development of the WX-27 and the WX-28. The larger diameter TX-27 was intended as a missile warhead or for internal carriage in aircraft while the smaller diameter TX-28 would be internally or externally carried on high-performance bombers. In a meeting in December the possibility of a small warhead allowing for smaller missiles was considered so the use of the TX-28 as a warhead was also included.

Design of the XW-28 was given to Los Alamos National Laboratory with Sandia National Laboratories working on the non-nuclear components. In February 1955 Sandia proposed that a basic warhead assembly be designed and that different noses, afterbodies, fins and fuzes could be attached to it. Emphasis was placed on obtaining the optimum yield possible within the space and weight limitations assigned which necessitated having a much thinner case design than in previous weapons. Sandia presented a design outline of the weapon to the Division of Military Application in May 1955.

It was decided that if the weapon could not be fitted to all of the required aircraft, first priority would be given to developing a bomb designed for subsonic internal or external carriage. Designers hoped though that they could produce a weapon considerably smaller than the 2,800 pounds (1,300 kg) and 25 inches (640 mm) diameter specified.

In April 1955 Sandia were working on the fuze design. Barometric fuzing was rejected due to the wide variety of delivery systems the weapon would use. A timer was also considered having benefits in low-level delivery missions, but it was felt that these gains were slight and did not justify the complexity of the system. Eventually, a combination of radar and contact fuzing was chosen.

Two fuze designs were under development; the first used existing components while the latter (called TX-28 Prime) required more development and used pyrotechnic-activated components. A contact backup was not initially included for the airburst design due to the concern that anti-aircraft fire might activate the contact fuze. Additionally, there was a desire to prevent fallout from a contact burst in the tactical mission.

Los Alamos informed the TX-Theta Committee in the same month that the nuclear system could enter production by January 1958, a date that matched Sandia's availability date for the non-nuclear components.

By May 1955 the TX-28 design firmed-up. The warhead itself would be 20 inches (510 mm) in diameter and 49 inches (1,200 mm) long, with each end capped in a hemisphere. The TX-28 Prime fuze design was also rapidly advancing. The design used pyrotechnically actuated switches to control preheat current, timer selection, thermal battery arming, ground- and air-burst selection, contact fuze arming, timer motor starting, trajectory-arm-switch pressure-port sealing, gas boosting and even thermal battery monitoring. These switches were small, lightweight and resistant to shock.

A baroswitch was included to improve operational safety of the weapon. It was a two-chamber design in which one chamber would close at weapon release and then the baroswitch would measure the pressure difference between the sealed and open chamber as the weapon fell. At some point in the design the fuzing system was changed to allow for contact preclusion to be selected on the ground. With contact preclusion selected the contact fuze would be disabled in the airburst option.

The initial Mod 0 used internal initiation, but in October 1955 Sandia described progress on external initiation of the weapon which eventually became the Mod 1 design. The external initiator system consisted of a power supply, precision timer and a neutron source called an S-unit. The S-unit was a tube filled with tritium gas while one end was titanium-coated and loaded with deuterium. During function the tritium ions were accelerated into the deuterium target which fused, releasing 14 megaelectronvolts (2.2 pJ) neutrons.

The Mk-28EX Mod 0 (external) and Mk-28IN Mod 0 (internal) were design-released in June 1957 and early production was achieved in August 1958. The weapon had a diameter of 20 inches (510 mm). The external configuration weapon had a length of 170 inches (4,300 mm) and weighed approximately 2,040 pounds (930 kg) with the nose section containing the fuze. In the internal configuration, the warhead section was turned around with the nose substituted for four wedge fins and the tail replaced with a blunt nose containing radar antennas and contact crystals. In this configuration the weapon had a length of 93.25 inches (2,369 mm) and weighed approximately 1,975 pounds (896 kg).

The design met almost all of the specified military requirements with some exceptions. One of these exceptions is still classified while the others were that the weapon did not have a visual indication of arming and that the weapon could not be stored for 18 months at the ready condition. Instead of a visual indication, the weapon relied on electrical signals to confirm that the weapon was not armed. The storage requirement was not met, as the weapon initially required pressure-testing at 30-day intervals.

=== RE and RI weapons ===
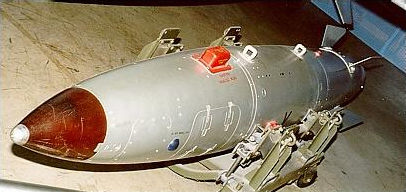
B28RE

Initial discussion about a ruggedized laydown weapon was discussed in August 1955 by the TX-Theta Committee. It was noted that Soviet radar capabilities were improving and that high-altitude attacks were becoming less certain. A low-altitude approach would help overcome this but would require a weapon that could survive impact with the ground before detonating once the aircraft was a safe distance away. Sandia had been investigating the problem and believed that designing a bomb to survive an impact shock of 200 to 300 g (2,000 to 2,900 m/s^{2}) was possible.

In October 1955 the Special Weapons Development Board met. Sandia stated that they had examined parachutes, rotochutes and retrorockets. Rotochutes could not handle the weapon's weight, while retrorockets placed special operating restrictions on the weapon. Parachutes showed promise, but existing designs were unsuitable, with Sandia working on developing an improved parachute. Sandia had also worked on developing shock-absorbing honeycomb materials, which included drop tests from a 300-foot (90 m) tower to simulate the 135-foot-per-second (41 m/s) impact expected in a parachute-retarded weapon.

In early 1956, Sandia concluded that a non-impact-resistant warhead could be used to produce an interim retarded weapon and this weapon system would meet weapon objectives 2 years before the development of a true laydown weapon. The weapon would use a pilot-parachute to deploy a larger drogue-parachute. This required a new bomb tail to be designed, which might aggravate ground and aircraft-clearance problems.

Production authorization for the RE weapon was issued in January 1957 and design release made in April 1958. The changes included a new altitude-sensing arming system to replace the baroswitches based on velocity sensing. This removed certain delivery restrictions on the Mk-28 Mod 0. The design also included an acceleration-integration system to detect if the parachute did not deploy and prevent bomb-arming.

The Mk-28RE (retarded external) was 166 inches (4,200 mm) long and weighed 2,140 pounds (970 kg). The design consisted of the Mk-28 Mod 1 Fuze and a set of Mk-28 Mod 0 RESC (Retarded External Shape Components). It was only available with the Mod 1 warhead. The Mod 1 warhead had the same yield options as the Mod 0, but not all yield options were stockpiled.

The Mk-28RI (Retarded Internal) weapon was designed released in April 1959 and achieved production in June 1960. The design weighed 2,265 pounds (1,027 kg) and was 132 inches (3,400 mm) long. The design consisted of the Mk-28 Mod 2 Fuze and the same Mk-28 Mod 0 RESC as the RE weapon. It also used the Mod 1 warhead.

=== FI weapon ===
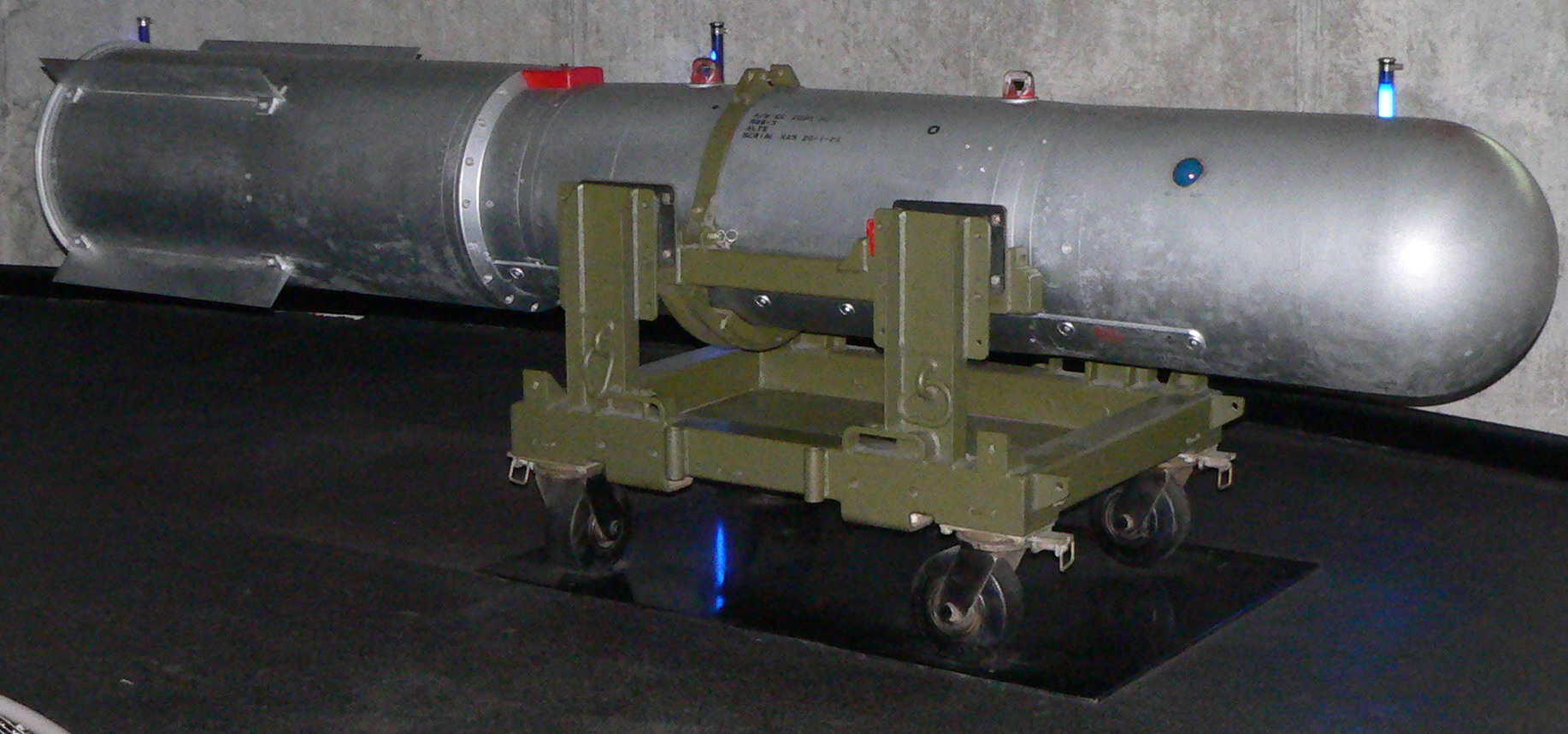
B28FI as used on a B-52 bomber

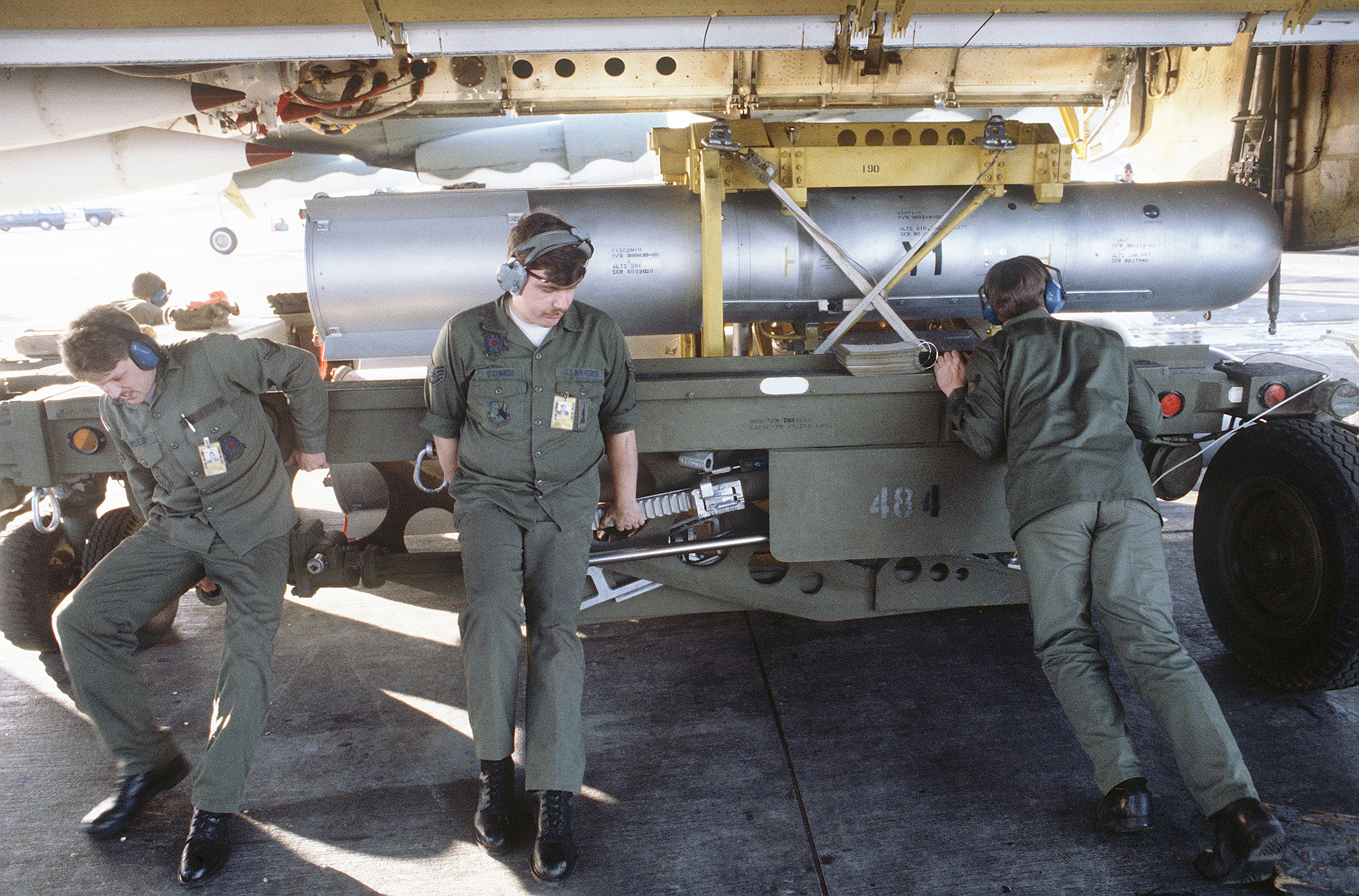
B28FI being unloaded from a Boeing B-52H in 1984. The 3 ground crew show the size of this weapon

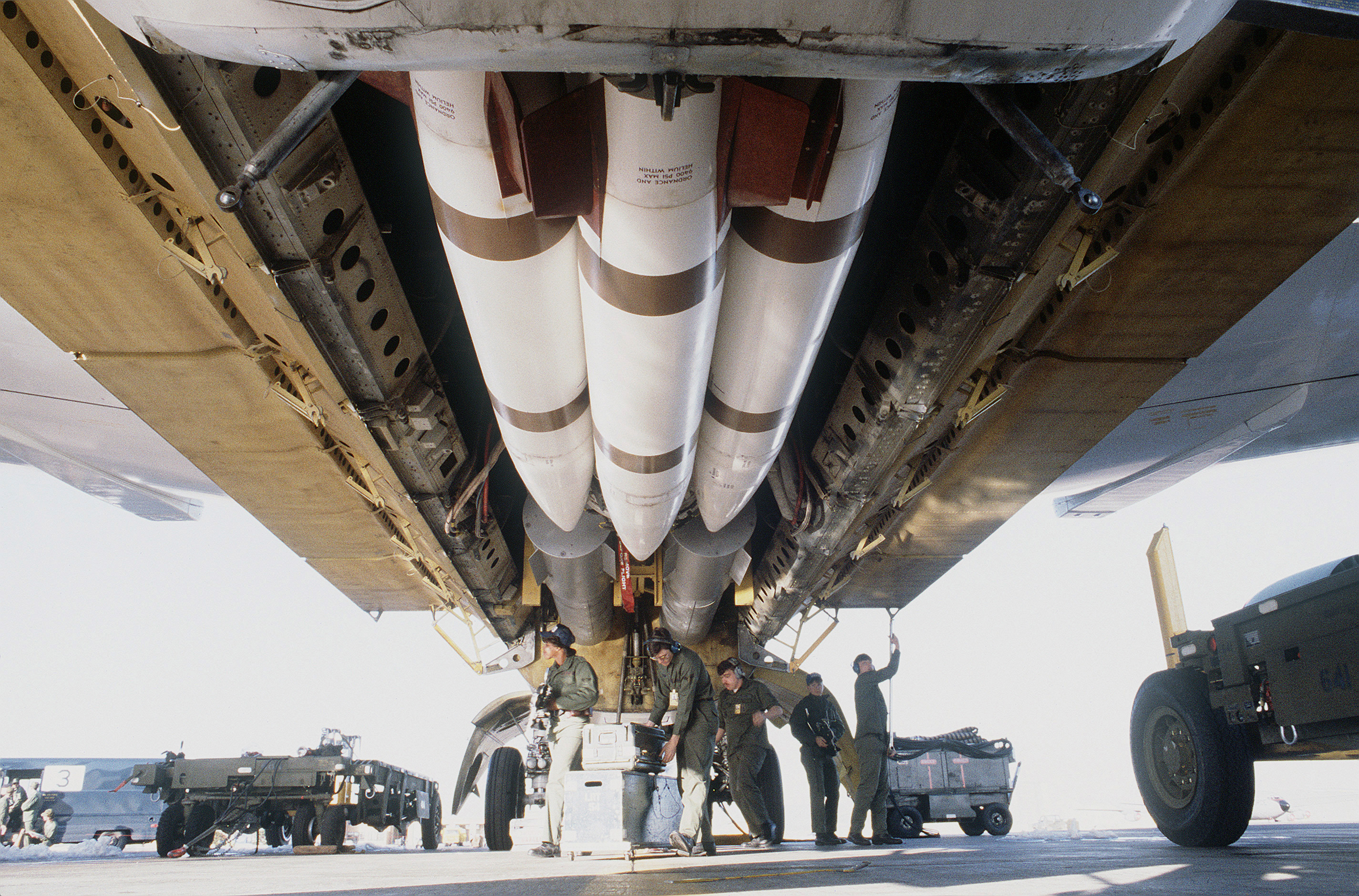
A pair of B28FIs loaded at the front of a B52 bomb bay, with three AGM-69 SRAMs in the foreground

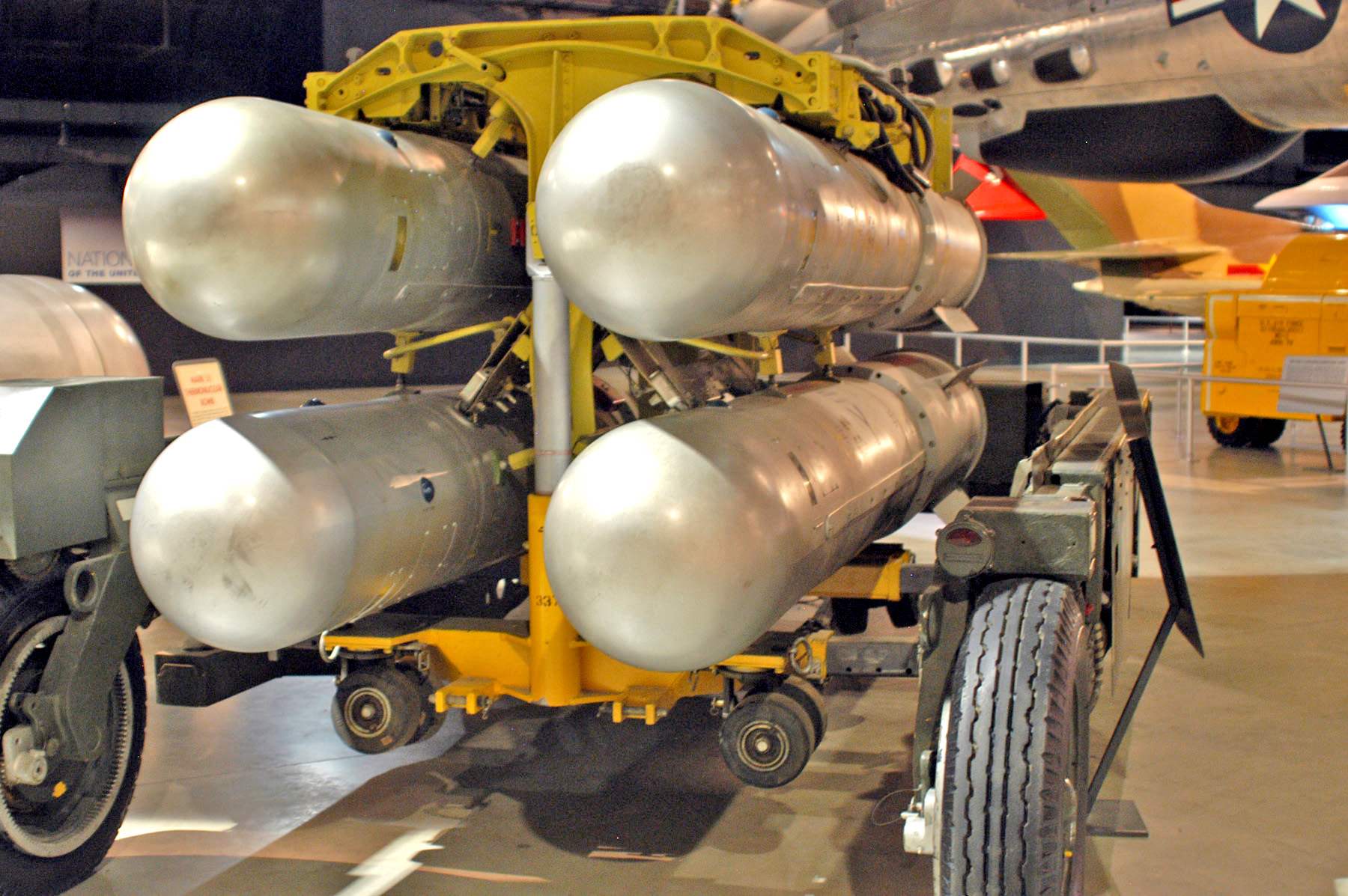
BDU-16/E trainers for the B28FI.

The Mk-28FI was the true laydown weapon desired during the development of the RE and RI weapons. The weapon was based on promising results from the TX-28-X2 warhead (which became the Mod 1 warhead) and would have a full-fuzing option capability. Previous weapons required a B-52 bomber to fly at at least 1,500 feet (460 m) for the weapon to survive laydown. It was hoped that a true laydown weapon would reduce this height to under 500 feet (150 m).

The proposal included requirements for delayed ground burst (laydown), retarded air burst, free-fall air burst and free-fall contact burst fuzing. The selection of air or contact burst would be selected via aircraft control equipment while the laydown option would automatically engage if the weapon was dropped below a certain pressure altitude. Most components were sourced from other programs meaning the main task of the program was developing a shock-mitigating structure and conducting fuze tests.

In August 1960 operational requirements for the TX-28-X3 warhead were issued. These requirements included the capability to survive release from 500 feet (150 m) and to be carried internally by the B-47 and B-52 bombers. The bomb nose was given 8 inches (200 mm) of crushable honeycomb and another parachute was added, raising the total number to four.

The Mk-28FI weapon was design released in October 1961. The weapon was 22 inches (560 mm) in diameter, 145 inches (3,700 mm) long and weighed 2,350 pounds (1,070 kg). The design consisted of a Mk-28 Mod 3 fuze and Mk-28 Mod 0 FISC (Full-Fuzing Internal Shape Components). The weapon could not use previous Mk-28 warheads, only being suitable for the TX-28-X3 (now called the Mod 2) and later warheads.

The laydown and retarded airburst time for the weapon was 79 seconds. In laydown mode, the weapon had to be dropped between 500 and 2,400 feet (150 and 730 m) to allow the weapon to reach the ground before the 79-second interval. Fall time at 500 feet (150 m) was approximately 10 seconds. Burst height in retarded airburst depended on release height. The weapon was unpredictable at releases between 12,000 and 17,000 feet (3,700 and 5,200 m) as either the freefall or retarded fuzing would be randomly selected.

== Variants ==
Twenty different versions of the B28 were made, distinguished by their yield and safety features. The B28 used the "building block" principle, allowing various combinations of components for different aircraft and roles.

The principal configurations were:

- B28EX – (EXternal), streamlined external-carriage for free-fall delivery. Design specifications called for carriage by the Air Force's B-47, B-52, B-57, B-66, F-84F, F-100, F-101 and F-105; and Navy's AJ-1, AJ-2, A2U-1, A3D-1, A4D, F2H, F3H-2, F7U-3 and P6M.
- B28IN – (INternal) unstreamlined internal-carriage version for free-fall delivery, primarily for the Republic F-105 Thunderchief and B-52.
- B28RE – (Retarded External) streamlined external-carriage version with a parachute retarder for low-level delivery.
- B28RI – (Retarded Internal) unstreamlined internal-carriage laydown weapon. Weapon specifications call for carriage by the B-47, B52 and B-66.
- B28FI – (Full-fuzing Internal) unstreamlined internal-carriage version for laydown delivery and full-fuzing option (i.e. with parachute retarded laydown, retarded air burst, free fall air burst and free fall ground burst fuzing). Specifications called for carriage by the B-47 and B52. The B28FI did not use the Mod 0 and Mod 1 warheads, as they were not strengthened for laydown delivery.

The following mods were produced:

- Mod 0 – Used on TM-76 Mace surface-to-surface missile and the GAM-77 Hound Dog cruise missile. Mod used an internal initiator while subsequent mods used external neutron initiators.
- Mod 1 – TX-28-X2 design. Also carried by Mace and Hound Dog missiles.
- Mod 2 – TX-28-X3 design. Mod was hardened for use with the B28FI configuration.
- Mod 3 – Mod had a Cat A PAL.
- Mod 4 – Mod had a Cat B PAL. Mod was hardened for use with the B28FI configuration.

The yield variants were:

- Y1 – 1.1 megatonnes of TNT (4,600 TJ).
- Y2 – 350 kilotonnes of TNT (1,500 TJ).
- Y3 – 70 kilotonnes of TNT (290 TJ)
- Y4 – Fission weapon, may have been the W34 warhead.
- Y5 – 1.45 megatonnes of TNT (6,100 TJ)

A total of approximately 4,500 B28s were produced. The last weapons in use were retired in 1991.

== Related designs ==
The W49 warhead for the Thor, Atlas, Jupiter, and Titan I ballistic missiles was a W28 Y1 warhead with internal power systems removed. It came in two yield options; the Y1 with a yield of 1.1 megatonnes of TNT (4.6 PJ) and Y2 with a yield of 1.45 megatonnes of TNT (6.1 PJ). Mods 0 to 2 were internally initiated while Mods 3 to 6 were externally initiated. The initial Mod 0 warhead lacked an environmental sensing device until concerns about accidental or deliberate (sabotage) detonation were raised.

== Accidents and incidents ==
- 1966 Palomares accident - Four B28FI weapons with either Mod 2 or Mod 4 warheads with Y1 yield option.
- 1968 Thule Air Base B-52 crash

== Survivors ==
Four Mark 28 training variants (BDU-16/E) on their transporter (MHU-7/M) are on display in the Cold War Gallery at the National Museum of the United States Air Force in Dayton, Ohio.

The Canadian War Museum, in Ottawa, holds a Mark 28RE training variant in its Cold War gallery. The Mark 28 armed CF-104 Starfighters in Germany, 1963–72, under the "Dual Key" protocol (both the US and Canada had to agree to use, with the weapons in US custody on Canadian bases).

The National Museum of Nuclear Science & History just outside Albuquerque, New Mexico has two damaged empty B28FI Mod 2 casings on display, originally belonging to the two most intact of the four bombs involved in the 1966 Palomares accident.

== See also ==
- B83 nuclear bomb
- Command and control
- List of nuclear weapons
- Python (nuclear primary)
- Red Snow—A British copy of the B28 warhead
