= List of Operational Requirements for nuclear weapons =

This list of Operational Requirements for nuclear weapons shows known Operational Requirements (ORs) specifically for nuclear bombs intended for use by the Royal Navy (RN) and the Royal Air Force (RAF) of the United Kingdom (UK).

An Operational Requirement, commonly abbreviated OR, was a UK Air Ministry document setting out the required characteristics for a future (i.e., as-yet unbuilt) military aircraft or weapon system. The numbered OR would describe what type of weapon was required. Operational Requirements were carried over with the dissolution of the Air Ministry and the creation of the Ministry of Defence (MoD).

== Table of Operational Requirements ==
Operational Requirement	year	Service	Description	Weapon
OR.1001	1946	Royal Air Force	Atomic bomb	Blue Danube
OR.1127	1953	Royal Air Force / Royal Navy	Small kiloton bomb	Red Beard
OR.1132	1954	Royal Air Force	Powered guided bomb	Blue Steel
OR.1139	1954	Royal Air Force	Medium range ballistic missile	Blue Streak
OR.1140	1954	Royal Air Force	Powered guided bomb	Blue Steel
OR.1141	1954	Royal Air Force	warhead for the powered guided bomb	Green Bamboo
OR.1142	1954	Royal Air Force	Megaton warhead	Violet Club
?	1955	Royal Navy	Kiloton warhead for Seaslug missile	Indigo Hammer
?	1957	British Army	Kiloton 8-inch artillery shell	Yellow Anvil
?	1958	British Army	Guided missile warhead	Blue Water
?	1958	British Army	Atomic demolition charge	Violet Mist
OR.1153	1958	Royal Air Force	Free-fall megatonbomb	
OR.1155	1958	Royal Air Force	Megaton warhead for anti-ballistic missile	
OR.1156	1958	Royal Air Force / Royal Navy	Nuclear depth charge	
OR.1157	1958	Royal Air Force	Megaton warhead for anti-ballistic missile	
?	1958	Royal Navy	Megaton warhead for naval use	
OR.1159	1958	Royal Air Force	Powered guided bomb	Blue Steel
OR.1160	1958	Royal Air Force	Megaton warhead for powered guided bomb	
OR.1161	1958	Royal Air Force / Royal Navy	Lightweight warhead for powered guided bomb	
OR.1166	1958	Royal Air Force	Warhead for Bloodhound missile	Indigo Hammer
OR.1171	1959	Royal Air Force	Megaton warhead for bomb or missile	Red Snow
OR.1172	1959	Royal Air Force	Kiloton warhead for Seaslug, Bloodhound and Blue Water	RO106/Tony
OR.1176	1960	Royal Air Force	Variable-yield kiloton warhead	WE.177
OR.1177	1960	Royal Air Force	Kiloton Red Beard replacement	WE.177
OR.1178	1960	Royal Air Force	Nuclear depth charge	
OR.1179	1960	Royal Air Force	Megaton warhead for Skybolt	
OR.1182	1960	Royal Air Force	Long-range air-surface missile	
OR.1187	1960	Royal Air Force	Skybolt	Skybolt

== See also ==
- List of Rainbow Codes
- List of Air Ministry Specifications
