= Red Beard (nuclear weapon) =

British tactical nuclear weapon

A Red Beard weapon on its bomb trolley, fitted with a bomb carrier prior to loading into an English Electric Canberra bomber. The two fore and aft vertical plates shown with holes in them were baffles unique to the Canberra installation, designed to reduce airstream buffeting that could tear off the bomb doors. The baffles were made from 1 in (25 mm) thick marine plywood, drilled with numerous 1 in (25 mm) diameter holes. The tail fins of the bomb are retracted.

Red Beard was the first British tactical nuclear weapon. It was carried by Royal Air Force (RAF) English Electric Canberra medium bombers and the V bomber force and by Supermarine Scimitars, de Havilland Sea Vixens, and Blackburn Buccaneers of the Royal Navy's (RN) Fleet Air Arm (FAA). Developed to Operational Requirement OR.1127, it was introduced in 1961, entered service in 1962. It was replaced by the WE.177 in the early 1970s and was withdrawn from service in 1971.

== Design ==
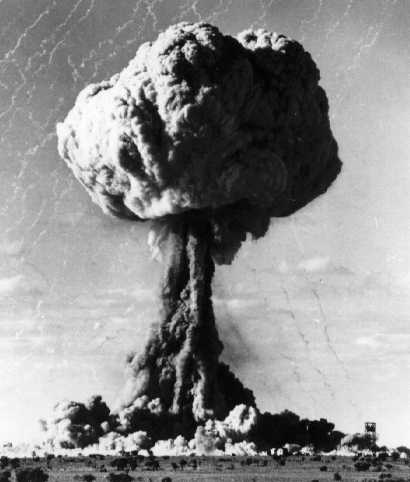
Explosion of a Red Beard warhead (codenamed Buffalo R1/One Tree, fired on 27 September 1956) during the British nuclear tests at Maralinga

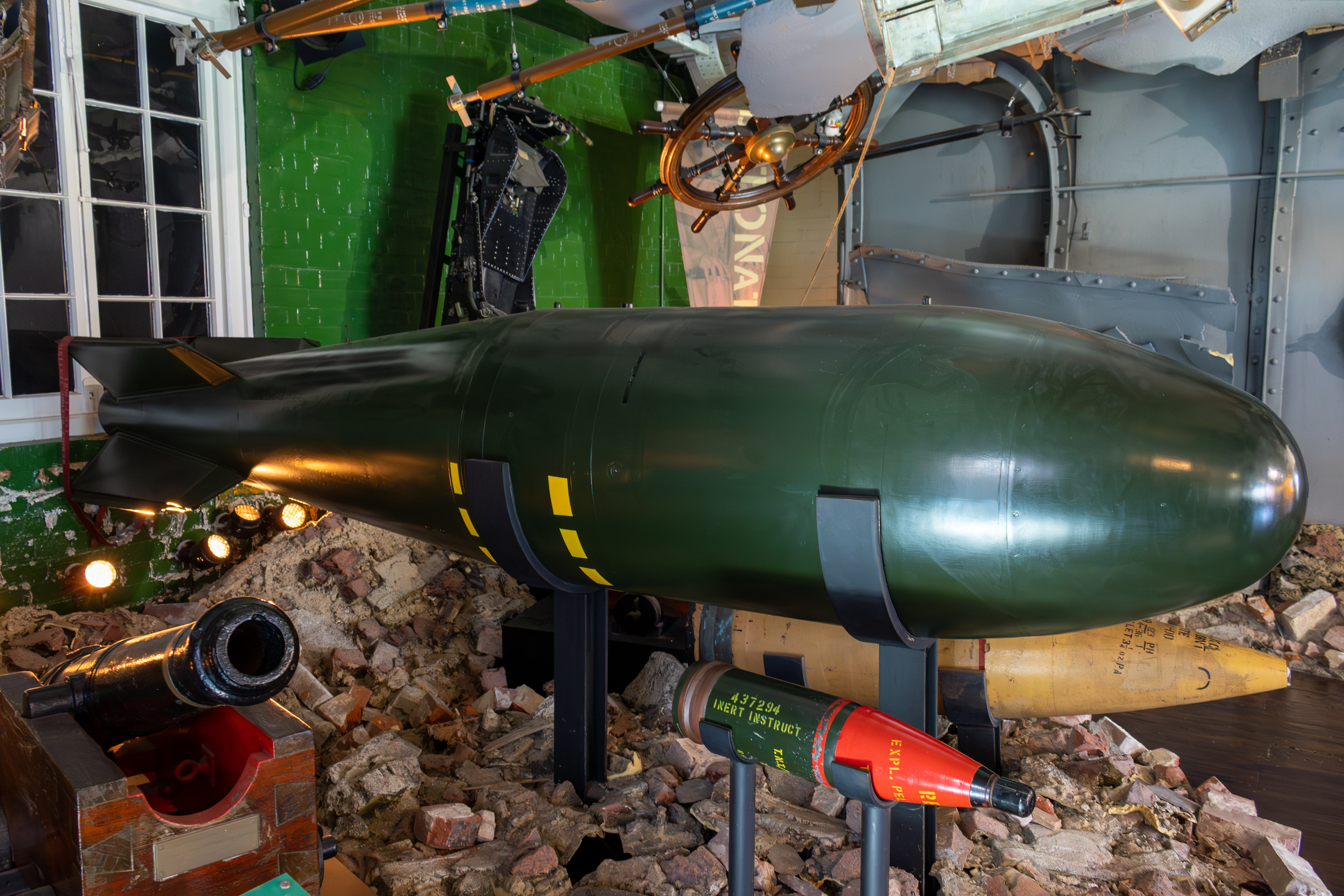
A Red Beard training variant on display at Explosion Museum of Naval Firepower

Red Beard was an unboosted fission weapon that used a composite core (mixed core in British terminology of the time). The composite core used both weapons-grade plutonium and weapons-grade uranium-235, and was intended to minimise the risk of pre-detonation that was a feature of all-plutonium designs of that period with yields larger than 10 kilotons (kt). An added benefit of the composite core was a more economical use of fissile material. The design was tested twice during the Operation Buffalo series of nuclear trials at Maralinga in Australia – first (codenamed Buffalo R1/One Tree) on 27 September 1956: a 15 kt explosion, after which the resulting mushroom cloud rose to a height of 11,430 m (37,500 ft), and again (codenamed Buffalo R4/Breakaway) on 21 October 1956. Although the design concept of Red Beard was similar to that of the Blue Danube warhead, an innovative means of implosion meant that its overall size could be significantly reduced.

It was 3.66 m (12 ft 0 in) in length, 71 cm (2 ft 4 in) in diameter, and weighed about 1,750 pounds (794 kg). Two versions were produced: the Mk.1, with a yield of 15 kilotons, and the Mk.2, with a yield of 25 kilotons. The Mk.2 was available in two variants, the No.1 used by high-altitude bombers, and the No.2 variant that was intended for low-level delivery by the toss bombing method, and its 'over-the-shoulder' variant referred to as the Low Altitude Bombing System (LABS).

Red Beard's Royal Air Force and Royal Navy service designations were:

- Bomb, Aircraft, HE 2,000 lb MC Mk.1 No.1
- Bomb, Aircraft, HE 2,000 lb MC Mk.1 No.2
- Bomb, Aircraft, HE 2,000 lb MC Mk.2 No.1
- Bomb, Aircraft, HE 2,000 lb MC Mk.2 No.2

Weighing in at approximately 794 kilograms (1,750 lb), Red Beard was considerably lighter than the 2,000 lb (910 kg) official service designation, which was based on the original technical requirement.

Another significant improvement over Blue Danube was the electrical system for the bomb firing mechanism and the radar altimeter fuse. Blue Danube had used 6 volt lead–acid batteries that were unreliable, and had to be installed at the last minute before takeoff. There were also potential risks associated with 'stray' electrical discharges to the firing mechanisms which might have led to accidental detonation. Red Beard used twin ram-air turbines located in the nose, from which there could be no stray discharges before bomb release. The air inlet can be seen in the extreme nose. They exhausted through 'blow-out' patches in the nose sides. Until bomb release, the weapon drew electrical power from the aircraft for heating and pre-heating of the radar fuzes.

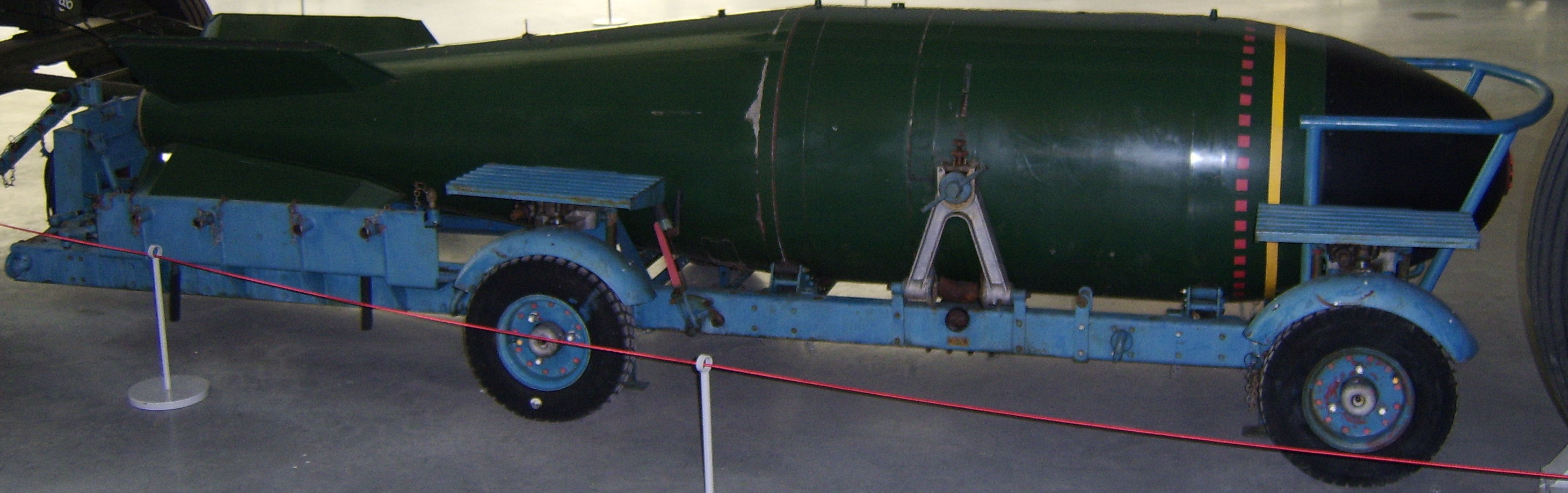
A Red Beard casing at RAF Cosford museum in 2007, shown without the 'drop' harness, and on the regular dolly

Like Blue Danube, the body diameter at 71 cm (2 ft 4 in) was greater than was desirable relative to the overall length of 3.66 m (12 ft 0 in). To compensate for this stubbiness, and quickly stabilise the bomb after release, Red Beard was equipped with flip-out tail fins that were activated pneumatically, triggered by a lanyard attached to the aircraft.

As with Blue Danube, the fuzing arrangements were composed of twin radar fuzes that were activated by a barometric 'gate' after release. The barometric gate ensured that the radar fuzes only transmitted in the last few seconds of free-fall, to a computed burst height, and this technique minimised the possibility of radar countermeasures disabling the radar fuzes. There were back-up contact and graze fuzes to ensure bomb destruction in the event of a misfire.

None of the variants allowed in-flight arming of the fissile core. The core was inserted before take-off, in a process referred to as 'last minute loading'.

The Mark 1 Red Beard required handling with extreme caution; it was feared that scraping or dropping an armed Red Beard would result in an explosion of up to 1 kiloton. The Mark 2 Red Beard had additional safety features.

== RAF service in United Kingdom and Singapore ==
Royal Air Force stocks of Red Beard for the Canberra and V-bomber forces totalled 110. Of these, forty-eight were deployed in Cyprus to meet the UK's commitments to Central Treaty Organization (CENTO), forty-eight were deployed in Singapore RAF Tengah to meet commitments to Southeast Asia Treaty Organization (SEATO), and the remainder were located in the United Kingdom.

Before the Red Beard codename was issued in 1952, it was frequently referred to in official documents as the 'Javelin Bomb', because it was originally conceived as a weapon for the 'thin-wing Javelin bomber', a projected derivative of the (thick wing) Gloster Javelin all-weather fighter. The designation 'target marker bomb' was a euphemism used to disguise the nature of the bomb, so that its dimensions and weights etc. could be circulated to aircraft and aircraft equipment designers, without compromising security.

It was replaced by the WE.177 in the early 1970s.

== Royal Navy ==
The Royal Navy had thirty-four Red Beard weapons, to be shared between Britain's five fixed-wing aircraft carriers (the strike carriers). No more than two strike carriers carried the weapon operationally at any one time. In 1962 the Navy calculated the numbers of WE.177 it would require in the 1970s as: 62 to replace Red Beard in the maritime strike role, and 75 as nuclear depth charges.

When HMS Victorious completed her reconstruction in 1958, she had "specially-equipped air-conditioned bomb rooms" designed for carrying nuclear weapons. She was the first British carrier so fitted. A strike carrier typically carried five Red Beards, starting with the Victorious, perhaps as early as 1959.

When carried by Royal Navy Scimitars, the weapon was mounted on an under-wing pylon, and there were concerns that the 28 in-diameter (71 cm) weapon could strike the deck during an arrested landing, so when in 1961 clearance was given for Scimitars to be launched from carriers with Red Beard, deck-landing with the armed weapon was forbidden, and diversion to a land base was mandatory. When the Buccaneer replaced Scimitar in the strike role, the Buccaneer carried Red Beard in its "rotating bomb bay out of harm's way" so deck landings were possible. All Sea Vixens could be fitted for Red Beard, as a backup to Scimitar and Buccaneer; though the Sea Vixen never deployed in the nuclear strike role. Clearance for all five strike carriers to launch Scimitar, Sea Vixen and Buccaneer with armed Mark 2 Red Beard had been given by 1963. On a Scimitar or a Vixen, the aircraft carried a single bomb under one wing, and balanced the weight of the bomb with a 200 imp gal drop tank (910 L) under the other wing. When full of fuel, the drop tank weighed about the same as the weapon. In an attack, the empty drop tank would have been released at the same time as the weapon.

The Mark 2 Red Beard was designed to allow low-level toss bombing. When the bomb was delivered this way, the aircraft was almost always at a lower altitude than the burst height; so in effect, the bomb was not really 'dropped', but was released and 'flew' upwards in a ballistic trajectory, to detonate when it reached the required altitude. Fitting a Scimitar for low-level toss bombing required the removal of all four Aden cannons and associated equipment including the gyro gunsight to make space to fit "a light fighter sight, LABS [Low Altitude Bombing System] control switch boxes, roller map display, [and a] tracking unit". LABS included "a toss-bombing computer and a Blue Silk Doppler navigation radar".

The Navy perceived Red Beard as a tactical weapon that could be used to destroy a raiding cruiser or to neutralise enemy ports and airfields. The Navy asked for a retarded version of the weapon, so that it could be used from low level without toss bombing. But it was a joint RAF-RN weapon, and the Navy relied on the Air Force to fund Red Beard's development, and the Air Force declined to fund it – possibly because they were asked in the 1950s at a time when the Air Force was only interested in high-level bombing.

== John Dolphin ==
Whilst Chief Engineer at the Atomic Weapons Research Establishment (AWRE), Aldermaston, John Dolphin worked on the Red Beard trigger mechanism. Subsequently, in July 1959, Dolphin requested an ex-gratia financial award for his work on the weapon; but was turned down. His claim was that although it was not his job to do so, he invented the 'Rotary Hot Line' device that eventually became the trigger for the Red Beard bomb (and which was used in all subsequent thermonuclear bombs). He further stated that his invention brought to an end the deadlock in meeting the specification for the Red Beard, and that he had to overcome "serious opposition" against the senior scientists whose job did include the brief for its invention. His claim was refused on the grounds that as a 'Chief Engineer', it was within the scope of his duties.

== Surviving examples ==
At the Air Force Museum in Cosford, England, one is displayed on a trolley in front of a bomber. A training version is on display at the Explosion Museum of Naval Firepower.

== See also ==
- Rainbow Codes

== Bibliography ==
- Leitch, Andy. "V-Force Arsenal: Weapons for the Valiant, Victor and Vulcan". Air Enthusiast No. 107, September/October 2003. pp. 52–59. ISSN 0143-5450
