= Common Missile =

US intercontinental ballistic missile project

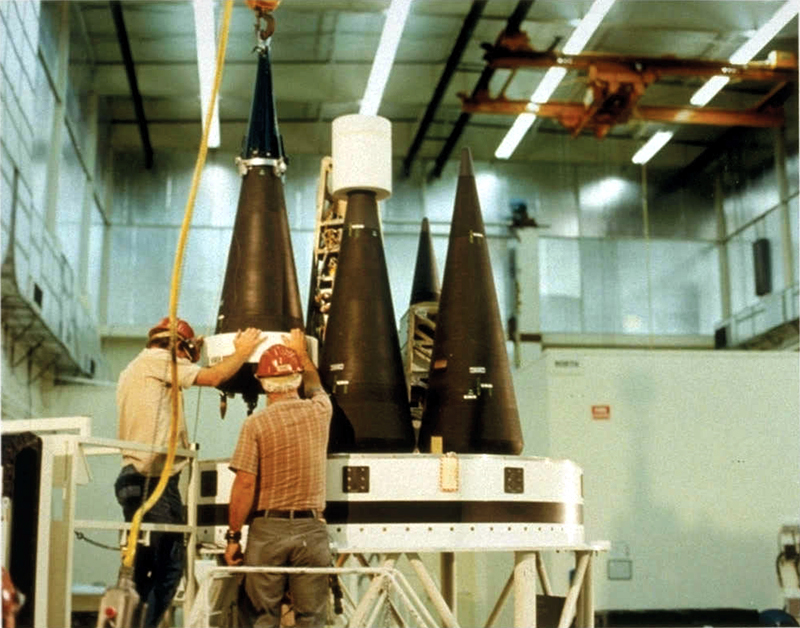
Common Missile was designed to deliver up to six MK21 reentry vehicles (pictured) as its payload

Common Missile was an intercontinental ballistic missile project, developed to satisfy U.S. Navy and U.S. Air Force operational system requirements for both SLBM and silo-launched ICBM, defined in the 1978 commonality study.

== Description ==
The Common Missile was designed as a four-stage solid propellant, stellar-inertial guided intercontinental ballistic missile capable of delivering up to six Mark 21 reentry vehicles to independent targets. It is propelled from a canister by a gas generator prior to first stage ignition. The post boost vehicle consists of a structure to house the guidance and solid propulsion systems and a platform to mount the reentry vehicles. The post boost vehicle provides the reentry vehicle spacing and deployment maneuvers. The basic dimensions, length, and diameter, were derived from submarine launcher volumetric constraints. The booster stages were sized to provide for Navy guidance access requirements at the II-III interstage and for at-sea maintenance access. The missile was designed to fill the current Trident submarine tube.
