= WE.177 =

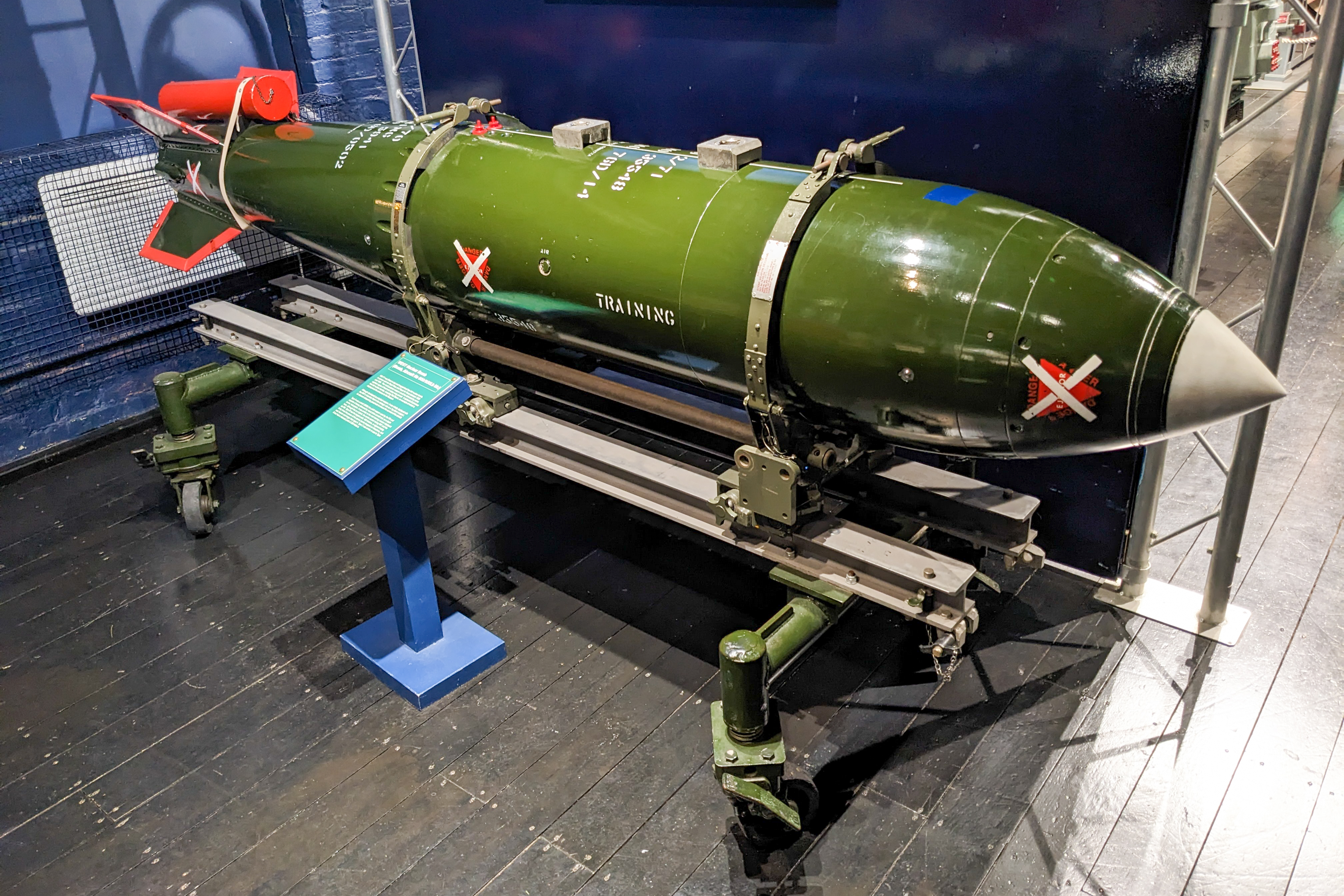
- WE.177 nuclear bomb (training example) at Explosion Museum of Naval Firepower
- Type: Free-fall gravity nuclear bomb
- Place of origin: United Kingdom

Service history
- In service: September 1966–1998
- Used by: Royal Navy and Royal Air Force
- Wars: Cold War

Production history
- Designer: Atomic Weapons Research Establishment (AWRE), Aldermaston
- Manufacturer: Atomic Weapons Research Establishment (AWRE), Aldermaston
- Unit cost: unknown
- No. built: ~319
- Variants: WE.177A, WE.177B, WE.177C

Specifications
- Mass: WE.177A: 272 kilograms (600 lb), WE.177B and WE.177C: 457 kilograms (1,010 lb),
- Length: WE.177A: 112 inches (284 cm), WE.177B and WE.177C: 133 inches (338 cm),
- Diameter: 16 inches (41 cm),
- Filling: WE.177A: ZA297 primary fission warhead WE.177B: ZA297 primary fission warhead & PT176 secondary thermonuclear fusion warhead WE.177C: ZA297 primary fission warhead & PT176 secondary thermonuclear fusion warhead
- Filling weight: unknown
- Blast yield: WE.177A: 0.5 kilotons or 10 kilotons WE.177B: 450 kilotons WE.177C: 200 kilotons

The WE.177, originally styled as WE 177, and sometimes simply as WE177, was a series of tactical and strategic nuclear weapons with which the Royal Navy (RN) and the Royal Air Force (RAF) were equipped. It was the primary air-dropped nuclear weapon in the United Kingdom from the late 1960s into the 1990s.

The underlying design was based on the US W59, which the UK had gained as part of their involvement in the GAM-87 Skybolt program. The RAF was not happy with the primary stage of the W59, which was potentially subject to accidental detonation when subject to mechanical shocks. Air Ministry Operational Requirement OR.1177 was issued for a new design using a less sensitive explosive, which was undertaken at the Atomic Weapons Research Establishment as "Cleo". When Skybolt was cancelled, the UK gained access to the UGM-27 Polaris missile and its W58 warhead, but they continued development of Cleo as a tactical weapon to replace Red Beard. A later requirement for a much smaller tactical and anti-submarine weapon for Navy use was filled by using the new primary as a boosted fission weapon.

Three versions were produced, A, B and C. The first to be produced was the 450 kilotonnes of TNT (1,900 TJ) WE.177B, which entered service with the RAF at RAF Cottesmore in September 1966. Further deliveries were delayed by the need to complete the warheads for the Polaris A3T. The Navy did not begin to receive its ~10 kt (42 TJ) WE.177As until 1969. The 190 kt (800 TJ) C models for the RAF followed.

All versions could be delivered by fixed-wing aircraft and could be parachute retarded. The WE.177A, in anti-submarine mode, could also be carried by helicopters.

The Navy weapons were retired by 1992, and all other weapons with the RAF were retired by 1998. When it was finally withdrawn in 1998, the WE.177 had been in service longer than any other British nuclear weapon. The WE.177 was the last nuclear bomb in service with the Royal Air Force, and the last tactical nuclear weapon deployed by the UK.

== History ==
In May 1960, Prime Minister Harold Macmillan signed an agreement with President Eisenhower to purchase 144 AGM-48 Skybolt missiles for the UKs V bomber force. Along with the missiles, the UK would receive the design of the Skybolt's W59 warhead, which was much smaller and lighter than even the smallest UK designs of the era. The UK version would be known by the codename RE.179.

The W59 primary (fission elements) used a polymer-bonded explosive codenamed PBX-9404. The British considered this to be unsafe, due to the potential for mechanical shocks to set off the PBX. Since the late 1950s, they had been working on their own primary design, originally 'Octopus', and then 'Super Octopus', that used more explosive and less fissile material, and was shock-insensitive as well. They proposed adapting the Super Octopus design for use in RE.179, calling the new version 'Cleo'. Cleo designs were tested underground at the Nevada Test Site in 1962. The secondary (fusion elements) of RE.179 remained identical to the W59's, and were known as 'Simon' in WE.177B, and as 'Reggie' in the ET.317 version for UK Polaris.

At the time, the UK's only tactical nuclear weapon was Red Beard, a relatively large weapon of 2,000 pounds (900 kg) weight. While work continued on Cleo, it was decided to adapt it as a weapon of its own to replace Red Beard, as the 'Improved Kiloton Weapon'. The adapted version of the primary, now the only part of the physics package, became 'Katie'. Katie would be used in a new bomb casing to produce WE.177A, replacing Red Beard with a weapon of roughly 1/3 the weight, and much smaller size. WE.177A would also be used by the Royal Navy, both for surface attack, as well as a nuclear depth bomb, or NDB.

When AGM-48 Skybolt was cancelled, part of the resulting Nassau Agreement was the replacement of Skybolt with the Polaris missile. Polaris A3T used its own warhead design, W58. The W58 was also rejected by the British because it also used PBX-9404 in its primary. The UK solution was to adapt their RE.179 for the UK Polaris, and assigned the codename ET.317. The need for ET.317 warheads for UK Polaris was urgent, and development of the Improved Kiloton Bomb was temporarily halted until the Polaris warhead programme was completed.

To fill the gap until Polaris entered service, it was necessary to provide RAF strategic bombers with a suitable weapon that would allow them to penetrate Warsaw Pact defences at low-level, minimising attrition from air defences. WE.177 was adapted to produce a high-yield interim strategic weapon for the five-year period, while the Polaris submarine force was building. Halting work on the original WE.177, now known as the 'A' model, a new version that used the W59 secondary, codenamed Simon, matched with a modified 'Katie B' primary created WE.177B. This version required a lengthened bomb casing, and was somewhat longer and heavier than WE.177A.

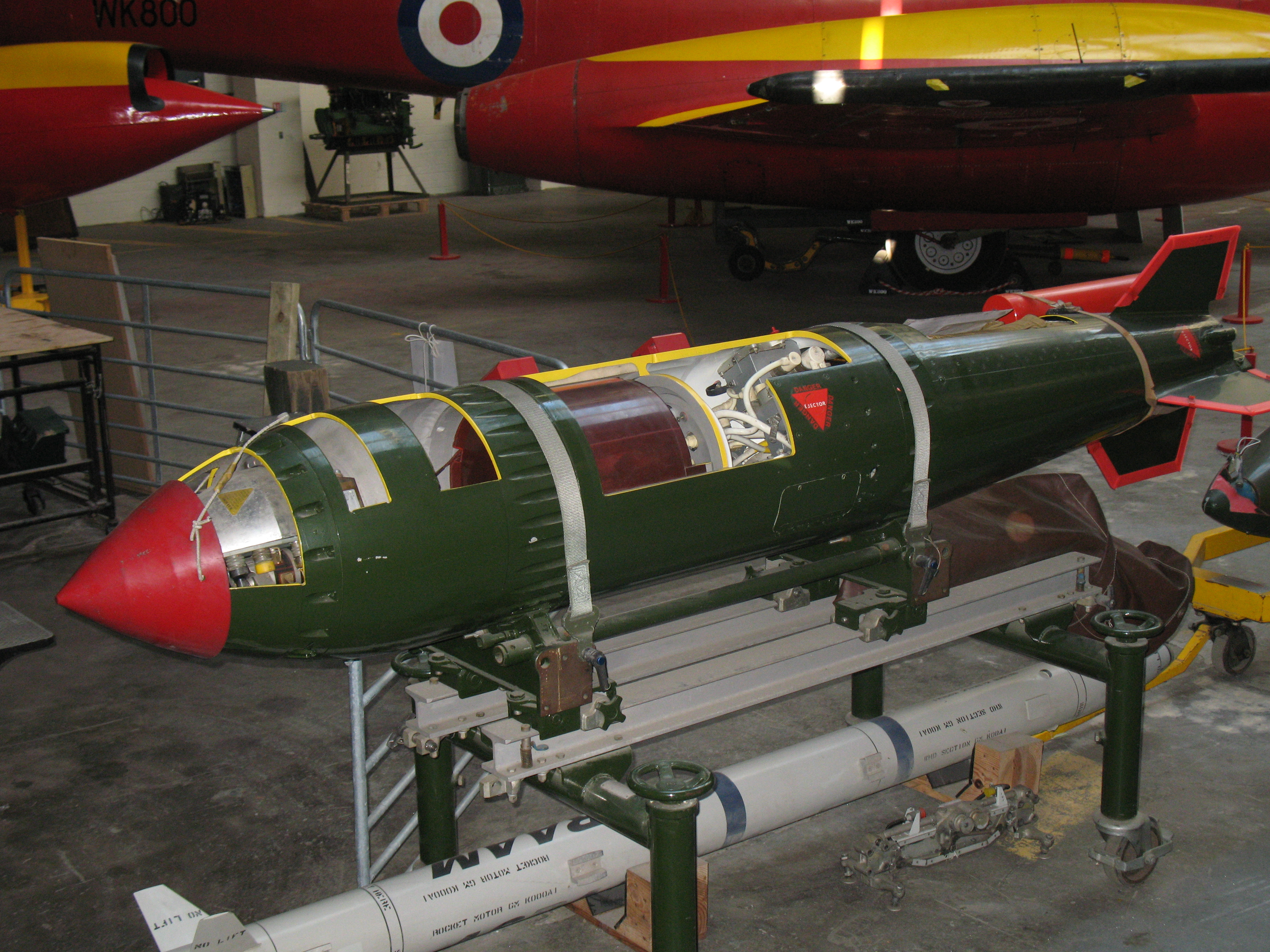
Rare WE.177A sectioned instructional example of an operational round, one of only two in existence, seen here at Boscombe Down Aviation Collection.

During the Chevaline program, the number of warheads on each Polaris missile was reduced from three to two. These now-redundant third warheads were adapted into the new WE.177C. This conversion consisted of removing the original primary, and replacing them with Katie A from the WE.177As. The new warhead was placed in existing WE.177B casings, and then ballasted to have identical weight and ballistics as the WE.177B.

== Deployment and usage ==
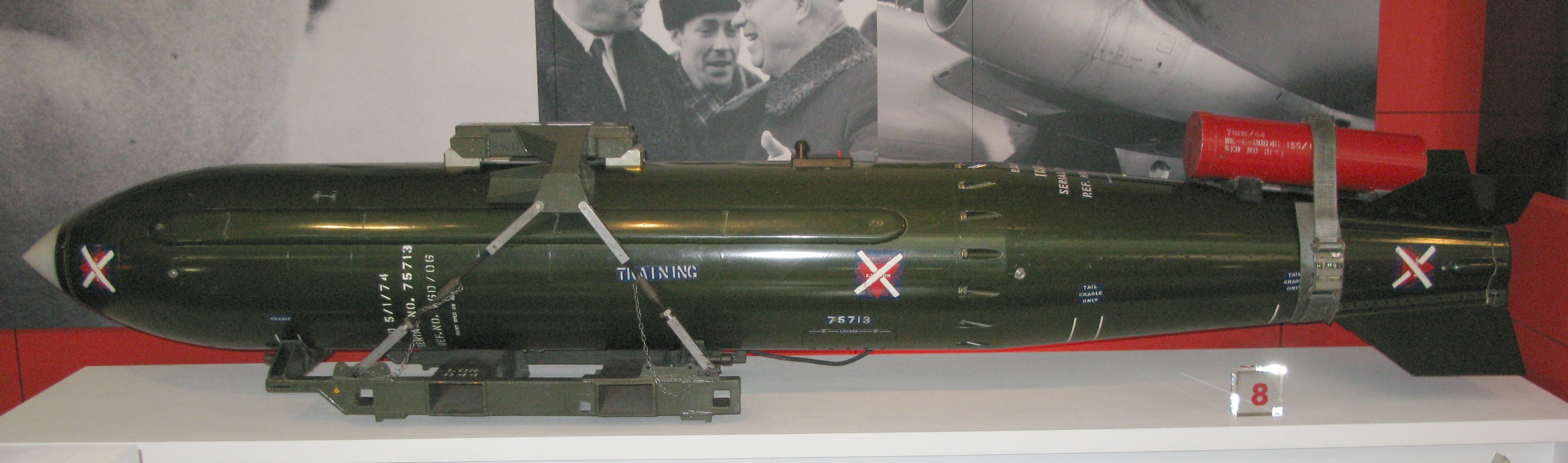
A WE.177B or C training round for ground instructional purposes. Externally identical to operational rounds, but manufactured in steel rather than aluminium alloy, and inert; i.e., does not contain any fissile materials, explosives, or other hazardous components. The red canister contains the cable required to connect the weapon to the aircraft systems. The white 'X's cover cartridge-operated ejection ports, and signify that as an inert round, explosive charges are not installed. 'Live' WE.177 bombs had a two inch wide orange band around the circumference of the nose.

Type A, B and C weapons were carried by strike aircraft, including the Avro Vulcan, de Havilland Sea Vixen, Blackburn Buccaneer, SEPECAT Jaguar, and Panavia Tornado. The Royal Navy Sea Harrier carried only WE.177A, slung beneath the starboard wing. The B and C models were too large for this aircraft. At one time, eight Tornado squadrons were nuclear capable.

Three paint schemes are known to have been used on WE.177; overall white with red and yellow bands (early paint scheme from the 1960s), and overall green with red details (later paint scheme from the mid-1970s onwards). The drill weapon used for loading and flight drills was Oxford blue. This was so that a live round could easily be identified, but service procedures required all training rounds to be treated and handled as if they were live. The training rounds even returned the correct indications to the carrying aircraft systems if they were 'armed' in flight. Most of the examples of WE.177 training rounds in museums have been re-painted in green, presumably to look like the original live rounds — an example re-painted green is located on the ground underneath the port wing of the Tornado at the Midland Air Museum.

As with all British thermonuclear weapons, the tritium gas used in the bomb core was purchased from the United States as part of the 1958 US–UK Mutual Defence Agreement; that permitted the US to obtain UK weapons-grade plutonium, in exchange for enriched uranium, tritium, and other specialised material uneconomical to produce in the UK in the very small quantities required. An industrial plant codenamed Candle located adjacent to the Chapelcross nuclear power station, near the town of Annan, Dumfries and Galloway, Scotland, was built to recover tritium from time-expired service weapons returned for routine maintenance or servicing. It was then recycled after removal of tritium decay products. All boosted fission weapons use tritium, which decays with time, reducing the designed fission yield by approx 4.4% per year. Reduction in the fission yield of a primary will reduce the thermonuclear nuclear yield by a similar proportion, or even lead to the thermonuclear fusion stage failing to ignite (known as a "fizzle"). To maintain optimum yield, all versions of WE.177 required routine maintenance about every three years. Normal servicing was carried out by specialist teams of RAF Armourers.

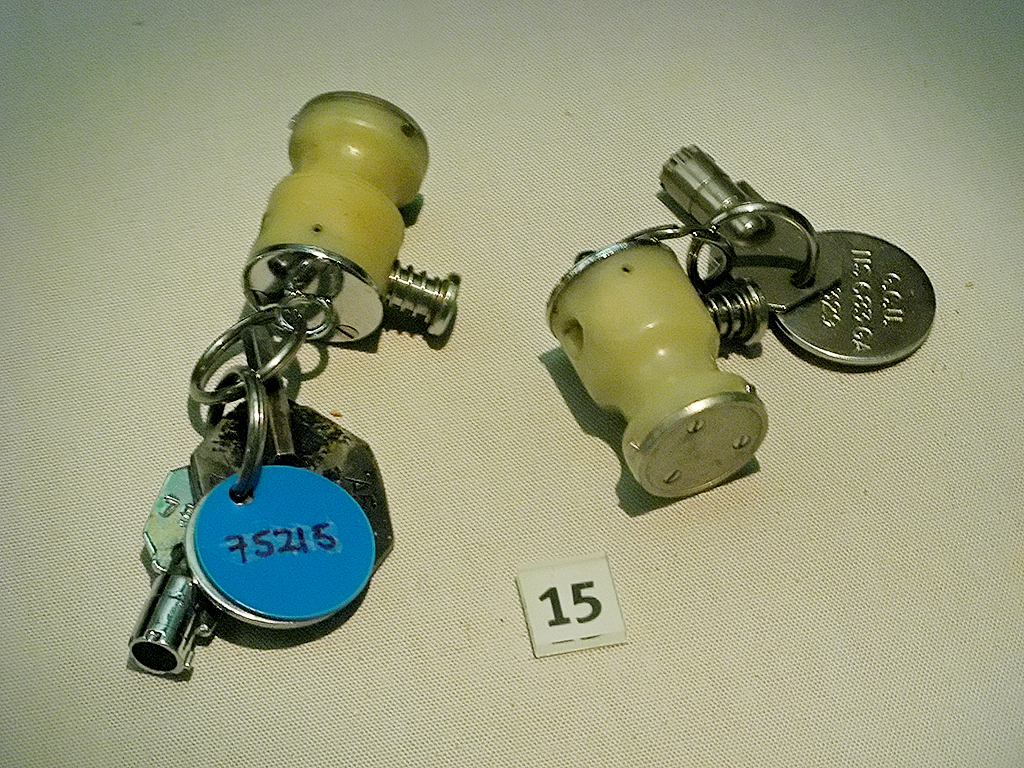
WE.177 safety and arming keys. The large white plastic part is the tool used to remove the protective cover from the lock.

Part of the safety and arming system on the WE.177 series was a simple key-operated Strike Enable Facility; using a cylindrical barrel key similar to those used on vending or gaming machines. By agreement with the owners of the lock's design rights, the key profile for each and every live weapon was unique, and would not be used for any other purpose. The profile for the training rounds was also not used elsewhere, but all training rounds used the same profile. The physical safety characteristics of WE.177 were probably comparable to similar US weapons, e.g. using the concept of being 'one-point-safe'. The safety and arming system was more sophisticated than on a conventional shell or bomb. The WE.177 safety and arming system had three safety breaks (which varied according to delivery mode) in the arming chain, whereas a conventional weapon only requires two.

The casing of WE.177 was unusually robust, and complicated, for a British air-dropped bomb; made necessary by the requirement for the laydown delivery options. The stresses from the opening of the drogue parachutes (3 for the A version, 4 for the heavier B/C variants) were particularly severe at the speed anticipated for the BAC TSR-2, the requirement stating a dropping speed of from Mach number M 0.75 to M 1.15, at a height of 50 feet (15 m) for TSR-2; and M 0.75 to M 0.95 for the Blackburn Buccaneer. This, together with the 'slap down' of the tail on impact required a strong, well-engineered bomb casing to ensure the enclosed warhead remained intact.

Apart from the laydown delivery requirement, the weapon was also required to be used in a 'dive toss' mode; from both the TSR-2 (WE.177A/B), and the RAF version of the Hawker Siddeley P.1154 (WE.177A). This involved releasing the weapon after a dive from 35,000 feet (11,000 m), with weapon release at between 15,000 feet (4,600 m) and 10,000 feet (3,000 m), and, for the TSR-2, at speeds from Mach 0.80 to Mach 2.05.

Intended clearance by 1970 for other types of aircraft and delivery methods included:

aircraft and delivery methods
aircraft	version	delivery methods
Handley Page Victor Mk.2	WE.177A/B	laydown, ballistic, retarded
Avro Vulcan	WE.177A/B	laydown, ballistic, retarded
Vickers Valiant Mks: B.1, P.R., K.1., P.R.K.1	WE.177A	laydown, ballistic, retarded
BAC TSR-2	WE.177A/B	laydown, ballistic, retarded, loft, dive toss
English Electric Canberra Mk.B.15 & B.16	WE.177A	laydown, ballistic, retarded, loft
Blackburn Buccaneer Mk.2	WE.177A	laydown, loft, retarded
Sea Vixen Mk.2	WE.177A	laydown, loft, retarded
Westland Wasp	WE.177A	depth charge
Westland Lynx HAS.1	WE.177A	depth charge
Westland Wessex HAS.3	WE.177A	depth charge
Westland Wessex HUS	WE.177A	depth charge
Hawker Siddeley Nimrod	WE.177A	depth charge

Later, the following aircraft were armed with WE.177:

aircraft and delivery methods (later)
aircraft	version	delivery methods
Blackburn Buccaneer Mk.2	WE.177A/B/C	laydown, loft, retarded
Panavia Tornado GR.1, GR.1A, GR.4, GR.4A	WE.177A/B/C	loft
SEPECAT Jaguar	WE.177A	laydown, loft, retarded
BAe Sea Harrier FRS1	WE.177A	laydown, loft, retarded

== Versions ==
=== WE.177A ===
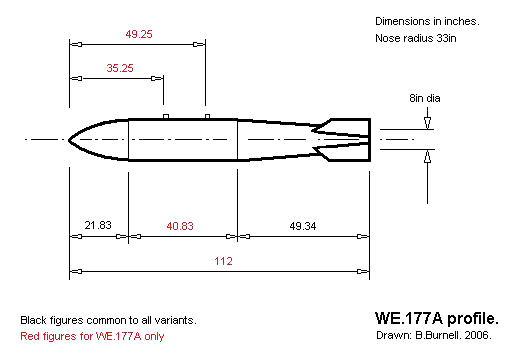
WE.177A

The addition of a nuclear option to Ikara. This was never implemented as fitment was cancelled in 1966 before clearance.

WE.177A weighed 272 kilograms (600 lb), and had a variable yield of 10 kt (42 TJ) or 0.5 kt (2 TJ). It was known to the British Armed Forces as 'Bomb, Aircraft, HE 600lb MC'. 'MC' (Medium Capacity) referred to a nuclear weapon in the kiloton range. The suffix 'HC' (High Capacity) referred to a weapon in the megaton range, although there were some anomalies.

The 0.5 kt yield was used only in the nuclear depth bomb role for detonation above 130 feet (40 m) in shallow coastal waters, or in oceanic deep waters to limit damage to nearby shipping. The full 10 kt yield was used below 130 feet (40 m) in deep oceanic waters where no shipping was at risk. The full 10 kt yield was also used by fixed-wing aircraft for surface attack. It had air burst, ground burst or laydown delivery options.

Although this variant matched the original Improved Kiloton Weapon concept with an added nuclear depth bomb function, and was identified as the A model, it was not the first to be deployed, due to the more pressing needs for the strategic B models. At least forty-three were deployed aboard Royal Navy surface vessels of frigate size and larger; for use by embarked helicopters as an anti-submarine nuclear depth bomb, starting in 1971. Helicopter-delivered nuclear depth bombs were not always immediately available, due to fuel-state, other taskings, or expended weapons load.

A further quantity of WE.177As were procured for the Fleet Air Arm's (FAA) fixed-wing strike aircraft. When the Navy's large aircraft carriers were decommissioned, around twenty warheads were transferred to the Royal Air Force. The remaining weapons assigned to the Royal Navy were retired in 1992.

The WE.177A was in service not only with the Royal Navy but also on the Royal Air Force bombers and attack aircraft.

=== WE.177B ===
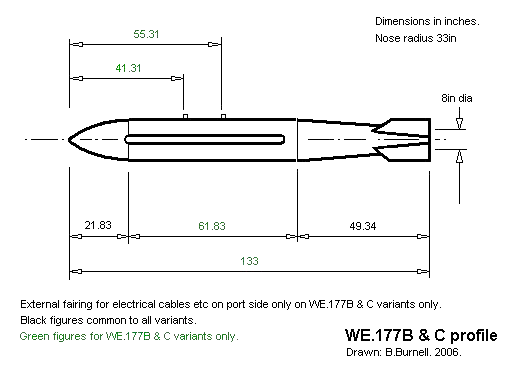
WE.177B & C

WE.177B weighed 457 kilograms (1,008 lb), with a fixed yield of 450 kt (1900 TJ). Although it weighed in excess of 1000 lb, it was known in RAF Service as the 'Bomb, Aircraft, HE 950lb MC', to differentiate it from the conventional 'Bomb, Aircraft, 1000 lb GP HE', which gave rise to its popular name '950'. WE.177B had airburst, impact, or laydown options.

Numbers built are still uncertain, but reliable sources put the figure at fifty-three (53), and all were retired by August 1998. When Polaris became operational, the Avro Vulcan continued in a sub-strategic tactical role with these and other bombs assigned to the NATO SACEUR. With the retirement of the Vulcans, WE.177B was carried by successor aircraft, including the Panavia Tornado.

=== WE.177C ===
WE.177C weighed 457 kilograms (1,008 lb), with a fixed yield of 190 kt (800 TJ).

WE.177C was deployed only in RAF Germany; in the tactical strike role, and used initially by the Jaguar, and later by the Tornado. It was deployed probably from the early 1970s, after deployment of Chevaline had begun. WE.177C was retired by August 1998.

variant	weight	length	estimated yield	operational (years)	estimated number
WE.177A	282 kg (622 lb)	112 in (284 cm)	0.5 kt, or 10 kt	1969–1992	~107
WE.177B	457 kg (1,008 lb)	133 in (338 cm)	450 kt	1966–1995	~53
WE.177C	457 kg (1,008 lb)	133 in (338 cm)	200 kt	~1980–1998	~159
total					~319

== Further development proposals ==
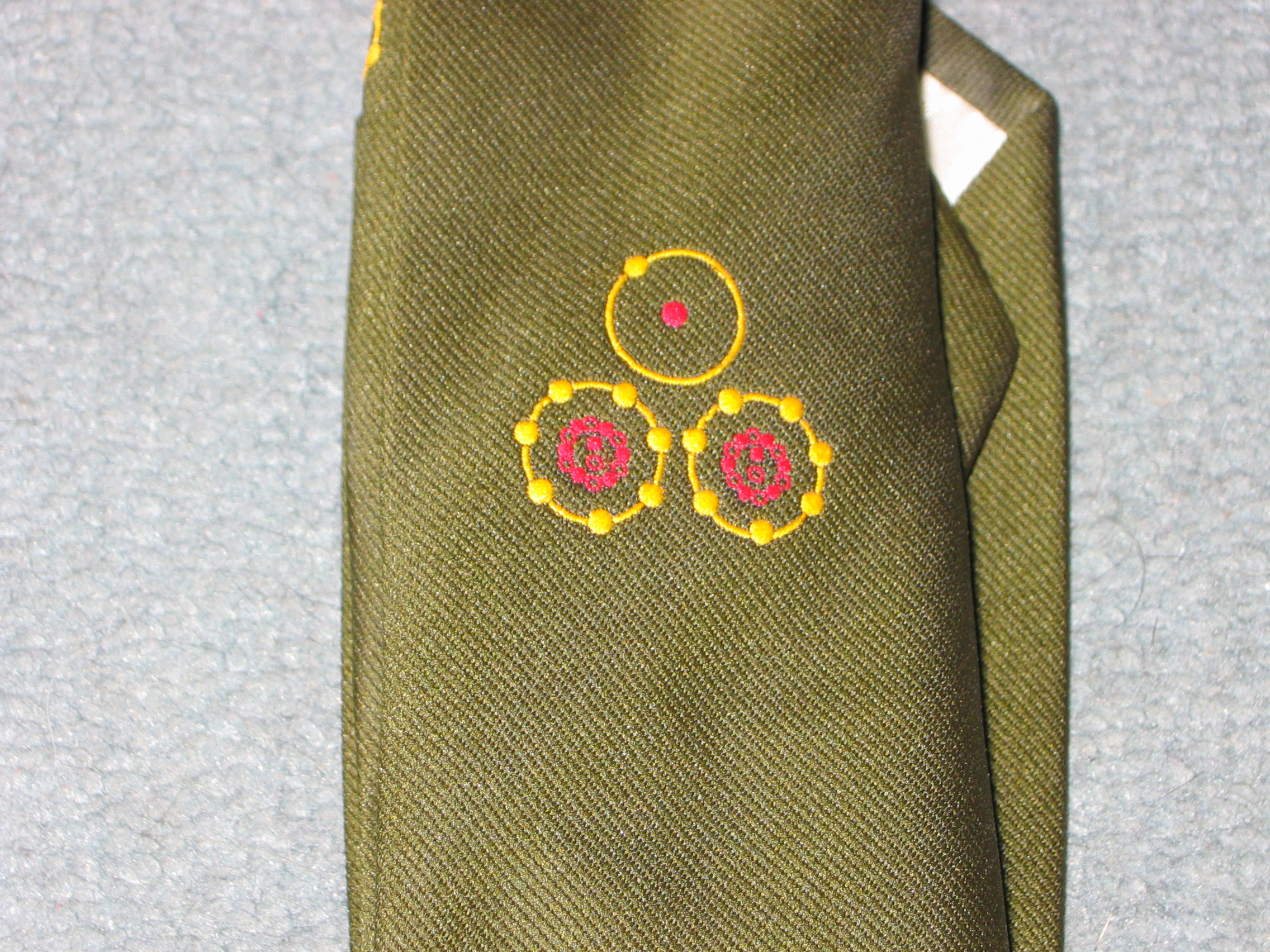
Detail of the official WE.177 project tie. The WE.177 project was denied a project tie for many years, because the project code was, unusually, itself classified. The symbols represent atoms: hydrogen, above two atoms of nitrogen; atomic numbers 1, 7, and 7, respectively.

There were several proposals to adapt WE.177A for other delivery systems. Among them were proposals to re-engineer the WE.177A warhead into two submarine-launched heavyweight torpedoes, which received some attention. The Mk.24N Tigerfish nuclear-armed torpedo had approved project status for some years, but was eventually shelved. Its raison d'être was to overcome the performance shortcomings of the Tigerfish torpedo, and especially its failure to meet the dive-depth requirements needed to counter deep-diving Soviet SSNs and SSBNs that had outstripped western torpedo performance. There was also a proposal endorsed by Flag Officer Submarines (FOSM), the Royal Navy's professional head of the Submarine Service, to use the WE.177A warhead in another torpedo, the shallow-running unguided Mk.8 torpedo of World War II vintage. A Mk.8 torpedo was chosen to sink the Argentinian warship General Belgrano, because it was of proven reliability, unlike the unreliable Tigerfish. This proposal did not gain approved project status, although its raison d'être was similar to that for Tigerfish, and intended to counter extended delays in Tigerfish development. FOSM's proposal stated that a 10 kt nuclear detonation at the Mk.8 torpedo's running depth of approximately 40 feet (12 m) would destroy a deep-diving SSN at 2,000 feet (610 m) depth.

The planned M4-Minus version of the Ikara was also intended to have a nuclear depth charge option as an alternative to its intended payload of a Mark 44 or NAST 7511 torpedo. However, this was cancelled in 1966. The M4-Minus project was apparently cancelled altogether sometime later.

== Falklands War ==
During the Cold War, WE.177A bombs, generally intended for use as depth charges (though able to be delivered in any operational mode by the Sea Harrier FRS1), were routinely carried on some Royal Navy warships, and the associated Royal Fleet Auxiliary (RFA) replenishment ships. They were kept in containers that were designed to float if they ended up in the sea. In 1982, with the outbreak of the Falklands War, some of these vessels were urgently assigned to the Naval Task Force, and began to steam south with their nuclear weapons still on board. The Ministry of Defence (MoD) has said that, en route, the bombs were offloaded from escort vessels Broadsword, Brilliant, Coventry and Sheffield; and were stored in the better-protected deep magazines aboard Hermes and Invincible; and the fleet replenishment ships Fort Austin, Regent, Resource, and Fort Grange which were accompanying the Task Force. Coventry and Sheffield were both later destroyed by enemy action near the Falkland Islands.

The MoD assert that the ships carrying nuclear depth bombs did not enter Falkland Islands territorial waters, or any other areas subject to the Treaty of Tlatelolco (that established the Latin America Nuclear Weapons Free Zone), to which the UK was a signatory. The MoD assert that the Task Force Commander-in-Chief was given instructions on deployment of his forces to avoid any breach of the treaty. They also state that all the nuclear weapons were returned to the UK aboard the Royal Fleet Auxiliaries Fort Austin and Resource on 29 June and 20 July 1982 respectively, after the end of the Falklands War.

== Retirement ==
The total number of all versions of WE.177 was between 200 and 250. All Royal Navy WE.177A weapons were retired in 1992. WE.177s were planned to remain operational until 2007, however in 1995 the government announced that all WE.177s would be withdrawn by 1998. This was achieved by August 1998. A planned replacement, the standoff Tactical Air-to-Surface Missile (TASM), had been cancelled in October 1993. Shortlisted options for this project were Boeing's SRAM, the Lockheed SLAT, and Aerospatiale's ASMP.

Trident D5 is the UK's sole remaining nuclear weapons delivery system (see Vanguard-class submarine), believed armed with a strategic warhead also usable in the sub-strategic role formerly performed by WE.177.

== Preserved examples ==
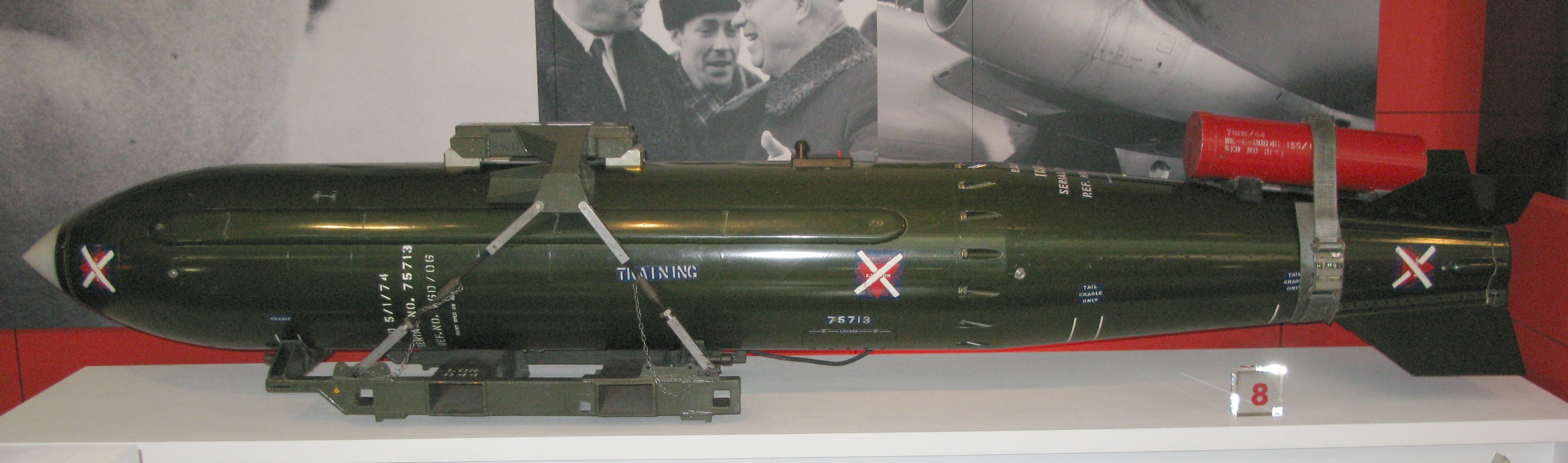
WE.177 training round at the Science Museum, London

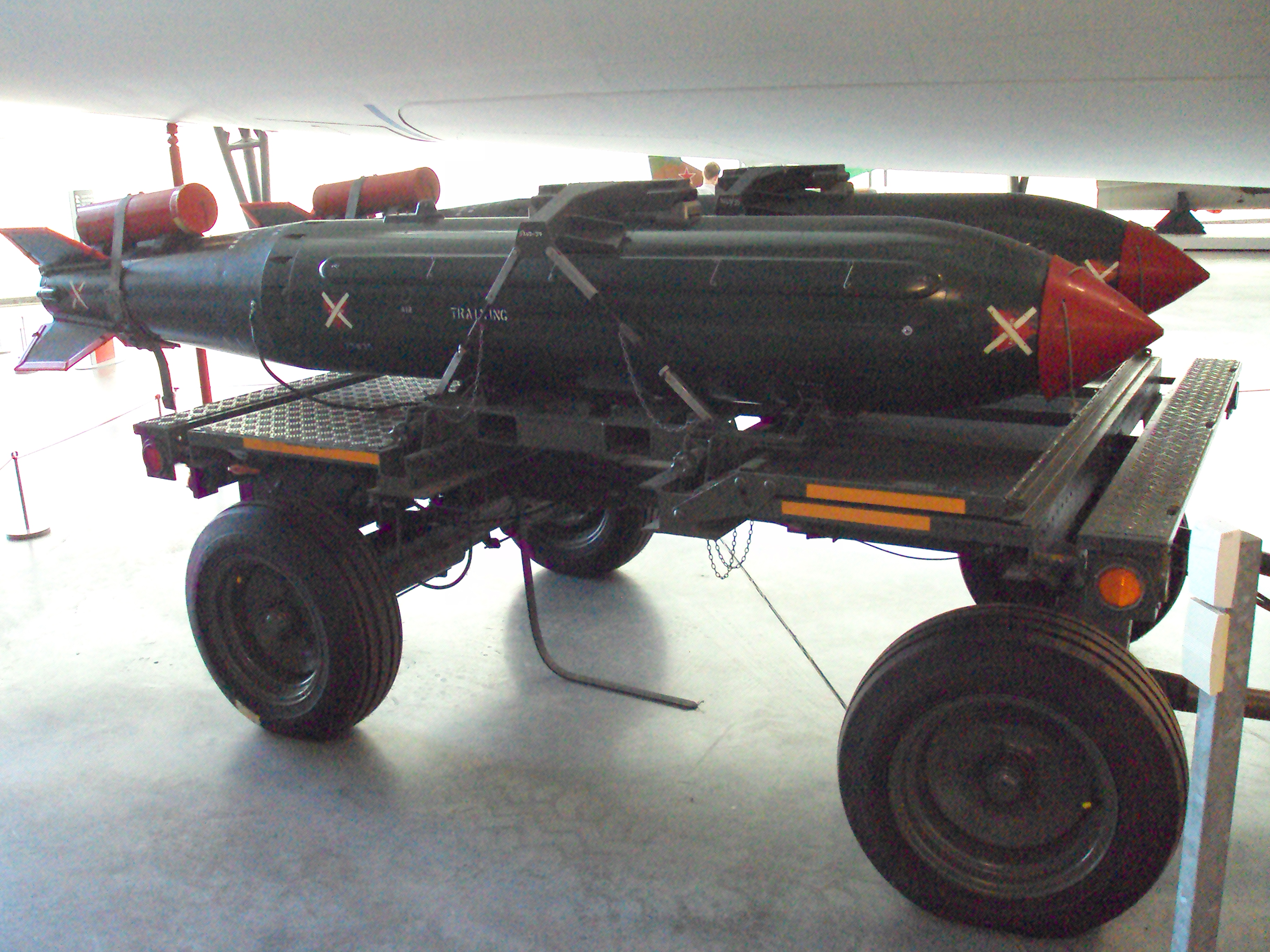
Two WE.177 training rounds at the Royal Air Force Museum Cosford

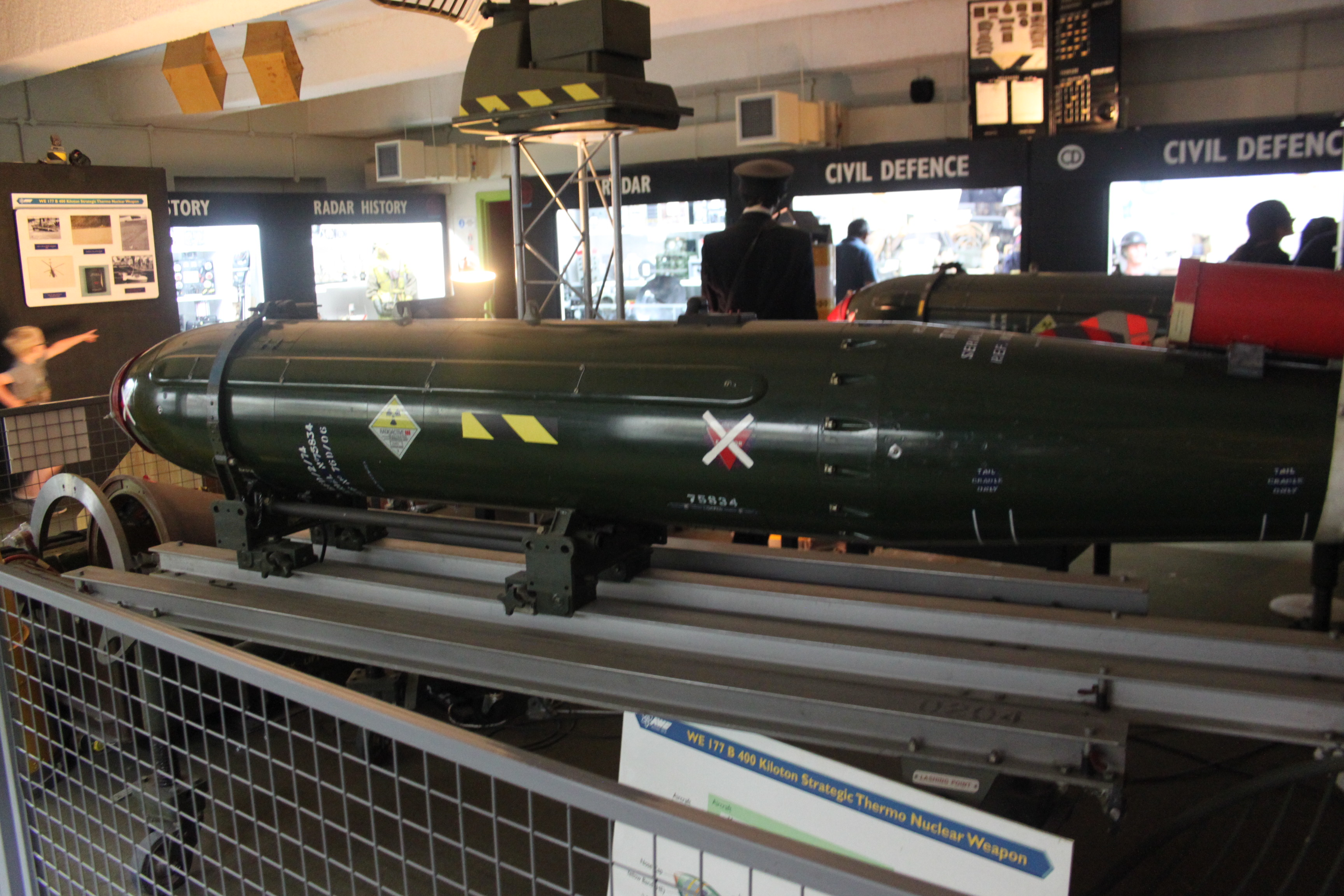
WE.177 training round at Hack Green Secret Nuclear Bunker

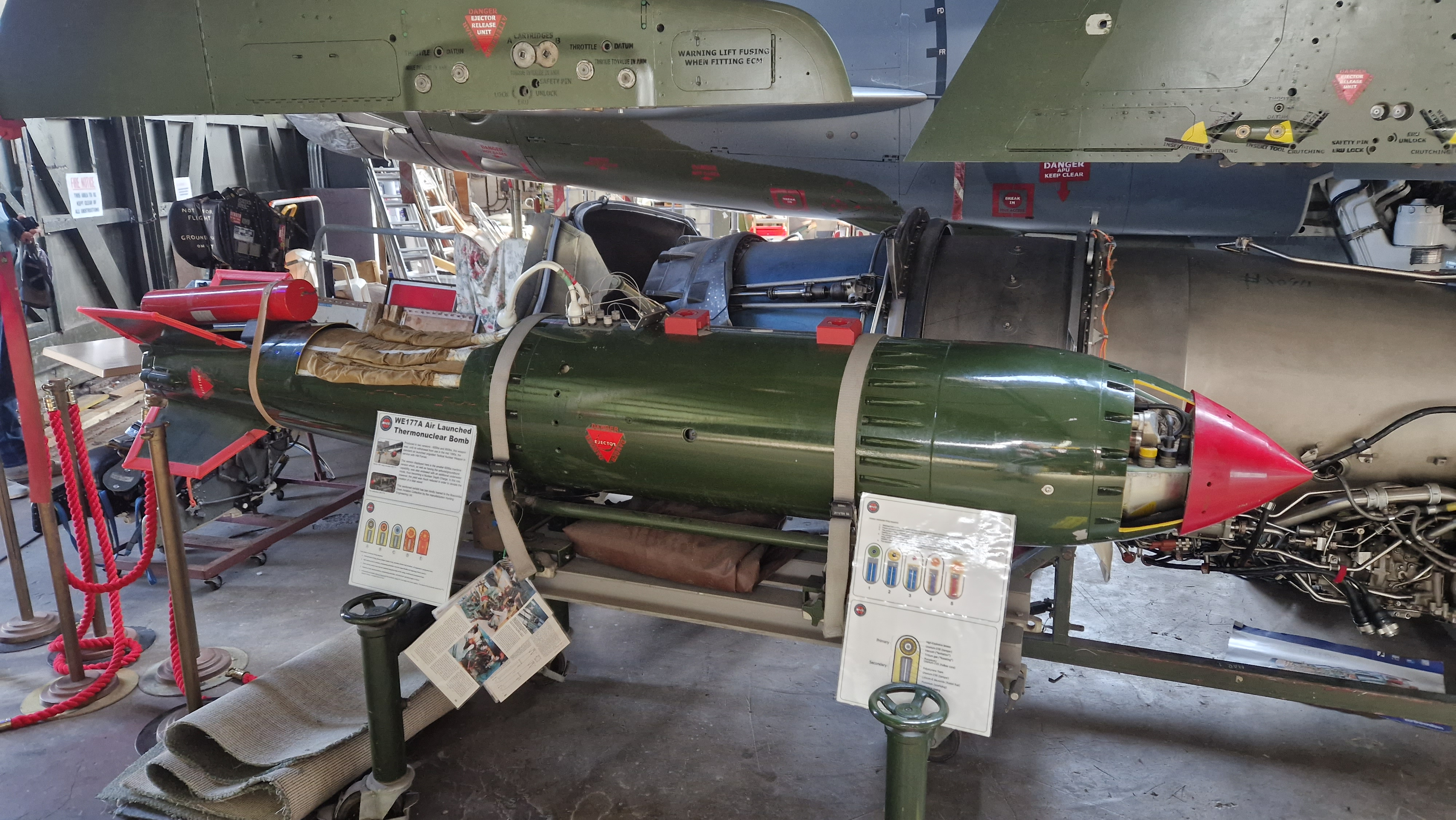
WE 177 at Boscombe down aviation collection

Two inert WE.177A operational rounds are on display:

- Boscombe Down Aviation Collection at Old Sarum Airfield (sectioned);
- Former Atomic Weapons Research Establishment (AWRE) laboratories at Orford Ness.The body of the item is marked AWRE/6/79 / HGYC and QV 06 79 / REF. No. 76D/00, which literally translates to "Atomic Weapons Research Establishment June 1979 / Hythorn Green Youth Club June 1979 Reference / Judgment No. 76 D00".The paint is white with orange and yellow stripes.

In addition, a number of WE.177 training rounds were donated to museums in the United Kingdom and one in the United States. Examples are on display at:

- Eden Camp Museum
- Explosion! Museum of Naval Firepower
- Farnborough Air Sciences Trust (two units)
- Fleet Air Arm Museum, RNAS Yeovilton, Somerset, England
- Hack Green Secret Nuclear Bunker
- Imperial War Museum Duxford (two units)
- Imperial War Museum North
- Midland Air Museum
- National Atomic Museum in Albuquerque, New Mexico, US
- North East Land, Sea and Air Museums in Sunderland
- RAF Marham Aviation Heritage Centre
- RAF Regiment Heritage Centre at RAF Honington
- Royal Air Force Museum Cosford (two units)
- Science Museum, London
- Vulcan Restoration Trust, Southend Airport
- Yorkshire Air Museum
- RAF Museum Laarbruch Weeze, Germany

== See also ==
- Yellow Sun (nuclear weapon)
- Nuclear weapons and the United Kingdom

== Bibliography ==
- Leitch, Andy. "V-Force Arsenal: Weapons for the Valiant, Victor and Vulcan". Air Enthusiast No. 107, September/October 2003. pp. 52–59. ISSN 0143-5450

=== Further reading ===
- Wayne D. Cocroft; Roger J.C. Thomas (2003). P.S. Barnwell (ed.). Cold War : building for nuclear confrontation, 1946-1989. Swindon: English Heritage. ISBN 1-873592-69-8. — outdated and accuracy now suspect.
- Carey Sublette (30 April 2002). "Britain's Nuclear Weapons; history of the British nuclear arsenal". NuclearWeaponArchive.org. The Nuclear Weapon Archive; A Guide to Nuclear Weapons. — outdated and accuracy now disputed.
- Dr Richard Moore; A Glossary of Nuclear Weapons; 'Prospero' – Journal of the British Rocket Oral History Programme (BROHP); Spring 2004; a visiting fellow at the University of Southampton.
- Dr.John R. Walker; A History of the United Kingdom's WE 177 Nuclear Weapons Programme; The British American Security Information Council (BASIC); March 2019.
