= Yellow Sun (nuclear weapon) =

First British operational high-yield strategic nuclear weapon warhead

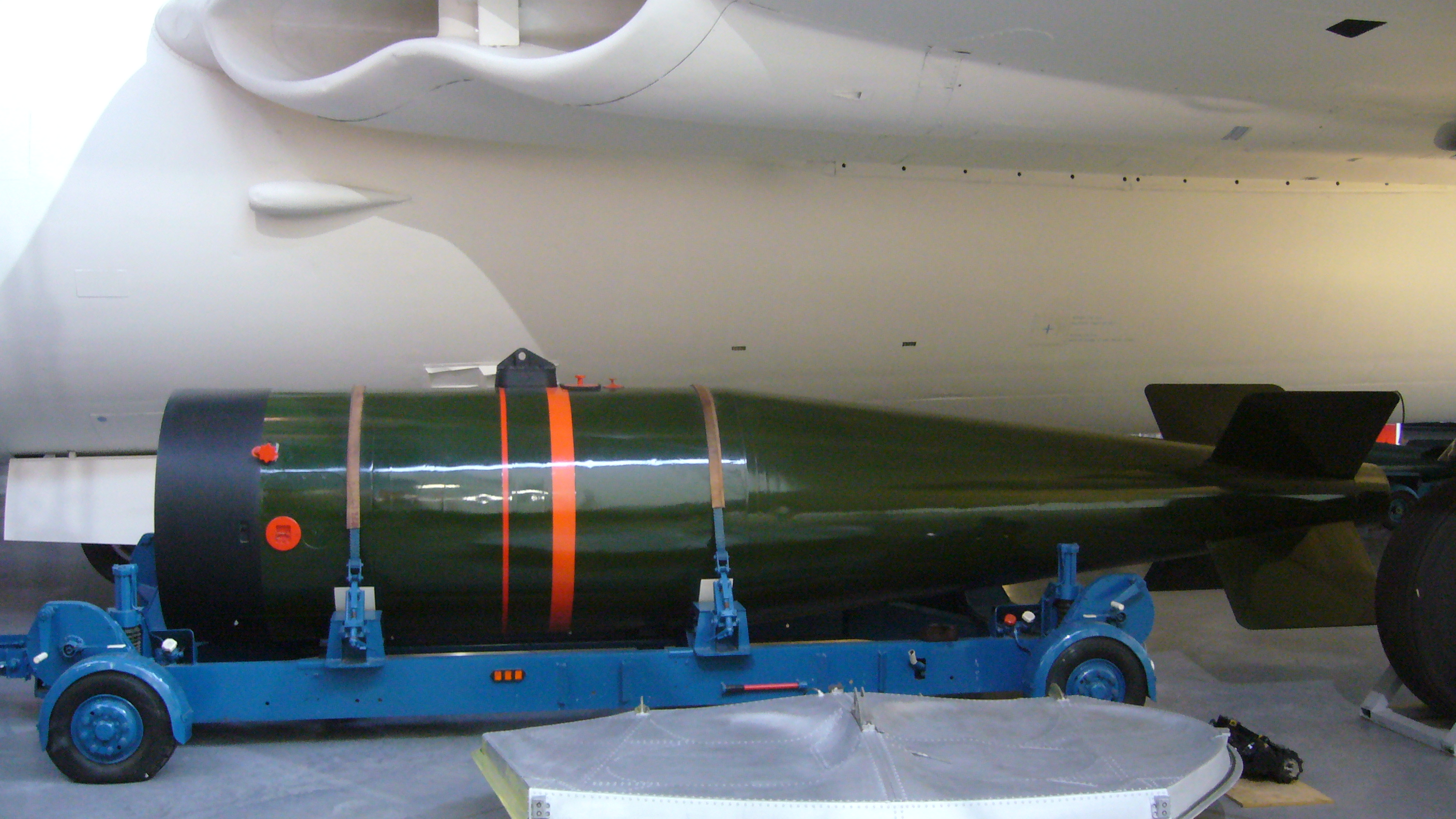
- A Yellow Sun at the Royal Air Force Museum Cosford (2011)
- Type: Nuclear weapon
- Place of origin: United Kingdom

Specifications
- Mass: 7,250 pounds (3,290 kg)
- Length: 21 feet (6.4 m)
- Diameter: 4 feet (1.2 m)
- Filling: Uranium – Green Grass warhead Plutonium/Hydrogen – Red Snow warhead
- Blast yield: 400 kt (1,700 TJ) Green Grass warhead 1.1 Mt (4.6 PJ) Red Snow warhead

Yellow Sun was the first British operational high-yield strategic nuclear weapon warhead. The name refers only to the outer casing; the warhead (or physics package) was known as "Green Grass" in Yellow Sun Mk.1 and "Red Snow" (a US design) in Yellow Sun Mk.2.

Yellow Sun was designed to contain a variety of warheads. The initial plan was that it would carry a layer-cake type warhead known as "Green Bamboo", and then replace it with a true thermonuclear warhead known as "Green Granite". After signing a weapon technology agreement with the US, both concepts were dropped. Green Granite would be replaced by Red Snow at an earlier service date. This meant the interim Green Bamboo was less important and it was replaced by the less powerful and simpler "Green Grass".

A unique feature of the Yellow Sun casing was its completely flat nose. This provided two benefits, one was that the drag allowed the bomb to fall behind the bomber a safe distance before detonation, and the other was that it did not generate the complex pattern of shock waves that a classically curved nose created, which made it difficult to measure altitude barometrically.

Mark 1 with Green Grass began to enter service in 1959, replacing the massive Blue Danube over the next year. Mark 2 with Red Snow began to replace it in 1961. Beginning in 1966, Yellow Sun was replaced by the WE.177, based on another US design.

== Design ==
A cutaway diagram of a Yellow Sun casing with Red Snow warhead

The casing was around 21 feet (6.4 m) long, and 48 inches (1.2 m) in diameter. The Mark 1 version with the Green Grass warhead weighed 7,250 pounds (3,290 kg). The Mark 2 Yellow Sun using the lighter Red Snow warhead had ballast added to maintain overall weight, ballistic and aerodynamic properties, and avoid further lengthy and expensive testing, and changes to the electrical power generating and airburst fuze.

Unlike contemporary United States bombs of similar destructive power, Yellow Sun did not deploy a parachute to retard its fall. Instead, it had a completely flat nose which induced drag, thereby slowing the fall of the weapon sufficiently to permit the bomber to escape the danger zone. Additionally, the blunt nose ensured that Yellow Sun did not encounter the transonic/supersonic shock waves which had caused many difficulties with barometric fuzing gates which had plagued an earlier weapon, Blue Danube.

Electrical power was supplied by duplicated ram-air turbines located behind the twin air intakes in the flat nose. The earlier Blue Danube design had relied on lead–acid batteries which had proven to be both unreliable and to require time-consuming pre-flight warming.

== Warheads ==
=== Green Bamboo ===
Yellow Sun Stage 1 and Stage 2 were the original designations. Stage 1 was intended as an interim design to carry a one megaton Green Bamboo warhead of the "layer-cake" type thought similar to the Soviet Sloika and the US Alarm Clock concepts. These hybrid designs are not now regarded as truly thermonuclear, but were then thought to be a stepping-stone on the route to a fusion bomb. Stage 2 was to follow when a true thermonuclear warhead based on the Green Granite design became available.

To produce the required yield, the implosion of the fissile core had to be extremely uniform. This required a complex 72-point explosive system, and led to a very large weapon overall. The resulting 45-inch (110 cm) diameter of Green Bamboo determined the 48 in (120 cm) diameter of both Yellow Sun and the Blue Steel missile.

The launch of Sputnik 1 coincided with ongoing negotiations between the US and UK about nuclear technology, and the sudden shock of an apparent Soviet superiority swept aside lingering US concerns about the UK after the Suez Crisis. These negotiations would lead to the US–UK Mutual Defence Agreement in 1958. With access to US designs, the original plan to use Green Granite for Stage 2 was abandoned as a new thermonuclear warhead would be available before Granite would be. This meant the need for a powerful interim design to fill this time period was also considerably less important. The decision was made to cancel Green Bamboo and replace it with a simpler concept.

=== Green Grass ===
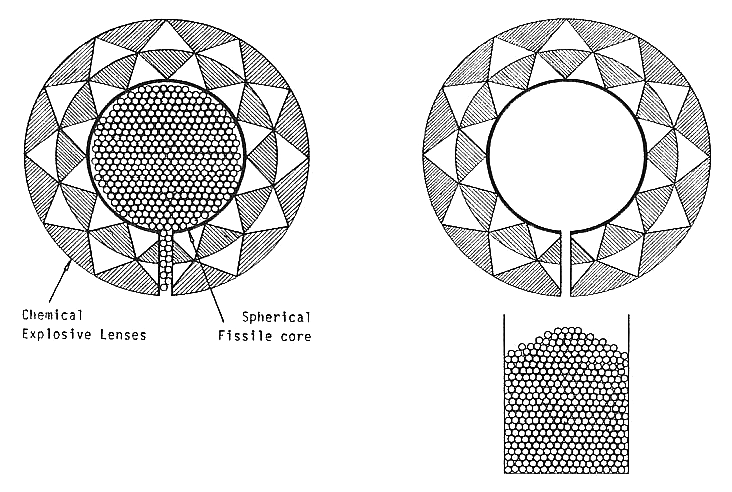
A diagram of the Green Grass warhead's steel ball safety device, shown left, filled (safe) and right, empty (live)

After Green Bamboo was abandoned a decision was made to use the Interim Megaton Weapon known as Green Grass in the Yellow Sun casing and designate it as Yellow Sun Mk.1 until better warheads were available for a Mk.2.

Green Grass was of similar layout to Green Bamboo, although it was not thermonuclear, being a very large unboosted pure fission warhead that was based in part on the core of the Orange Herald device tested at Grapple, with some of the implosion and firing features of Green Bamboo. The modulated neutron initiator was Blue Stone.

Initially, twelve Green Grass warheads were fitted in the much larger, older casings derived from Blue Danube and known as "Violet Club". These twelve warheads were later transferred to the Yellow Sun Mk.1 casings and supplemented by further warheads totalling 37.

Green Grass yield was originally stated to the Royal Air Force (RAF) as 500 kilotons of TNT equivalent (2.1 PJ), but the designers' estimate was later revised downwards to 400 kt of TNT. The Green Grass warhead was never tested. It used a dangerously large quantity of fissile material – thought to be in excess of 70 kilograms (150 lb), and considerably more than an uncompressed critical mass. It was kept subcritical by being fashioned into a thin-walled spherical shell. To guard against the accidental crushing of the core into a critical condition, the shell was filled with 133,000 steel ball-bearings, weighing 450 kilograms (990 lb). In a conflict, these would have had to be removed before flight. The RAF thought it unsafe (see Violet Club § Controversy).

=== Red Snow ===
Red Snow was the US W28 warhead used in the US Mk-28 nuclear bomb. This was anglicised to adapt it to British engineering practices, and manufactured in Britain using British fissile materials. For further information see the "Deployment" section below.

== Deployment ==
A Yellow Sun-cased bomb on its trolley

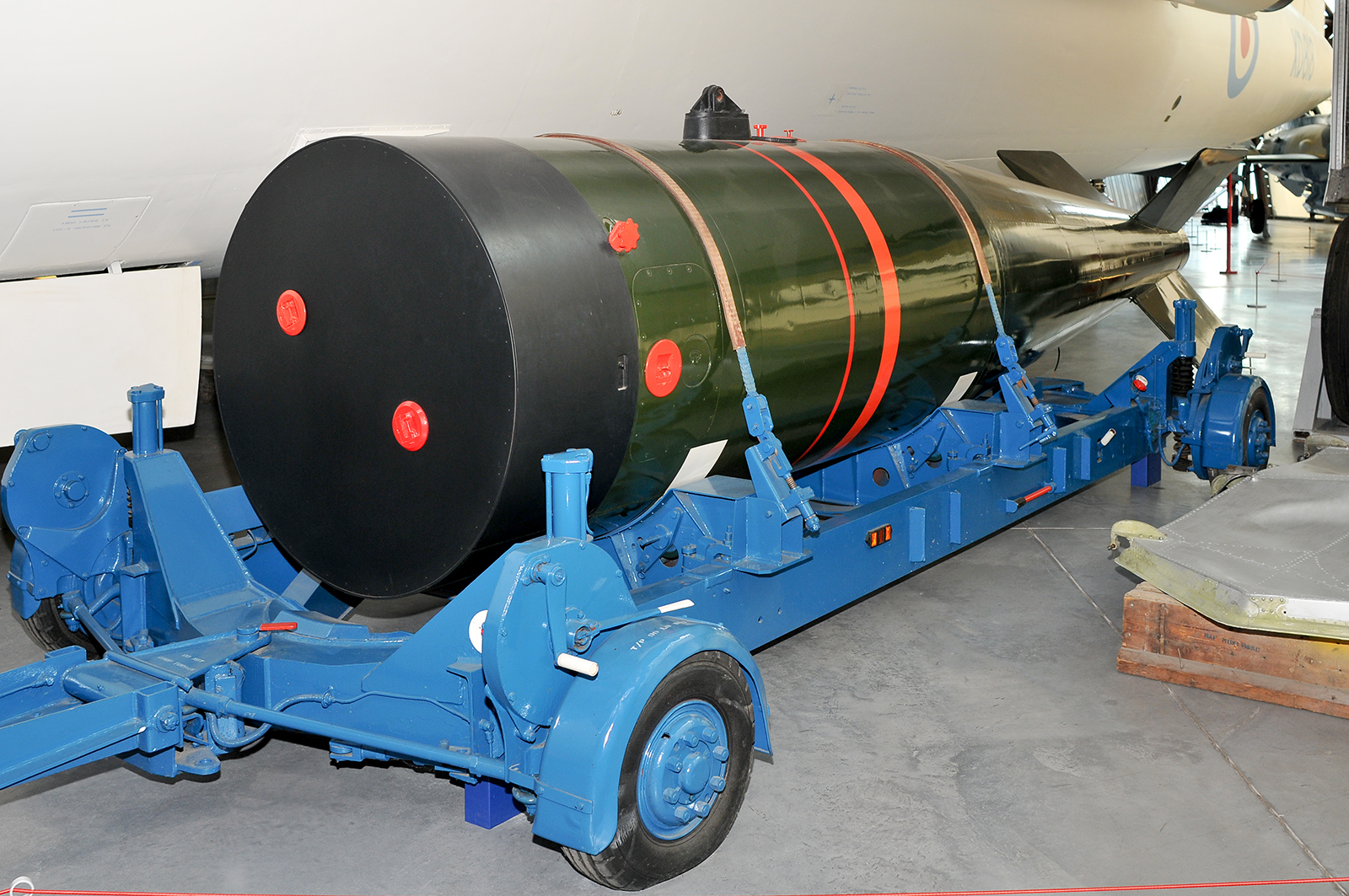
Yellow Sun at RAF Museum Cosford

Deployment started in 1959–60. The RAF Service designations were Bomb, Aircraft HE 7000 lb HC Mk.1 or Bomb, Aircraft HE 7000 lb HC Mk.2. (Note: In RAF jargon, the letters "HC" (from High Capacity) referred to nuclear bombs in the megaton range. Kiloton range tactical bombs were designated with the letters "MC" (Medium Capacity).) Yellow Sun Mk.1 was intended as an "emergency" weapon, and had not been engineered for reliable long-term stockpiling. It was always envisaged that a Mk.2 version would be available later fitted with a true thermonuclear warhead derived from the Granite type tested at Grapple, or an American type made available after the 1958 US-UK Mutual Defence Agreement. It was carried only by RAF V bombers.

In September 1958 a decision was made to abandon the Granite type warheads intended for Yellow Sun Mk.2 (and Blue Steel, and Blue Streak MRBM) and instead adopt the US W-28 warhead used in the US Mark 28 nuclear bomb. This was anglicised to adapt it to British engineering practices, and manufactured in Britain using British fissile materials and known as Red Snow. Red Snow was more powerful, lighter and smaller than Green Grass. It was always envisaged that the Yellow Sun bomb casing would be adapted for successor warheads to minimise unessential development time and cost. Yellow Sun Mk. 2 entered service in 1961, and remained the primary air-dropped strategic weapon until replaced with WE.177B in 1966.

Although the first British designed thermonuclear weapon to be deployed, Yellow Sun was not the first to be deployed with the RAF. US Mk-28 and Mk-43 thermonuclear bombs and others had been supplied to the RAF for use in V bombers prior to the deployment of Yellow Sun. Some bombers of the V-force only ever used American weapons supplied under dual-key arrangements.

== See also ==
- Rainbow Codes

== Bibliography ==
- Leitch, Andy. "V-Force Arsenal: Weapons for the Valiant, Victor and Vulcan". Air Enthusiast No. 107, September/October 2003. pp. 52–59. ISSN 0143-5450
