= Violet Club =

British nuclear weapon

Violet Club was a nuclear weapon deployed by the United Kingdom during the Cold War; the name was chosen in adherence to the Rainbow code system. It was Britain's first operational "high-yield" weapon and was intended to provide an emergency capability until a thermonuclear weapon could be developed from the 1956–1958 Operation Grapple tests. Violet Club was ultimately replaced in service by the Red Snow warhead, derived from the US W28 warhead.

== Conception, design and development ==
In 1953, shortly after the Americans tested a thermonuclear device in 1952, followed by the Soviets with Joe 4, (Note: Joe 4, aka the Sloika design / RDS-6s test, while demonstrating thermonuclear reactions was not a true thermonuclear device) the Atomic Weapons Research Establishment (AWRE) at Aldermaston was asked about the possibilities for a very large pure fission bomb with a yield of one megaton. This study referred to the Zodiak Mk.3 bomb, but progressed no further than a rudimentary study.

At this time studies were also started that ultimately led to a decision in July 1954 to develop a thermonuclear weapon. The design studies were split into two tracks because the British at that time had not yet discovered the Teller–Ulam technique necessary to initiate fusion. One track led to an intermediate design, the so-called "Type A" thermonuclear design, similar to the US Alarm Clock and Soviet Sloika hybrid designs; these types of weapons are now regarded as large boosted fission weapons and no longer regarded as thermonuclear. A true thermonuclear design, one that would derive a large amount of its total energy from fusion reactions, was referred to as "Type B".

Development of the Type A design was carried out under Green Bamboo, which weighed about 4,500 lb (2,045 kg), and its spherical shape measured about 45 inches (115 cm) diameter, with a 72-point implosion system. This was intended as the warhead for all projected British strategic delivery systems of the period; the Yellow Sun Stage 1 air-dropped bomb, and the Blue Steel air-launched stand-off missile. The large girth of these weapons was designed to accommodate the diameter of Green Bamboo's implosion sphere.

Green Bamboo was too large to fit in the Blue Streak missile, whose design was already well advanced. This led to a reduced-size design, later known as Orange Herald, which was made smaller largely by reducing the size and complexity of the implosion system. This produced less compression of the core and less efficient use of the fissile fuel, so to make up for this loss of performance the amount of fuel was increased. Estimates computed from reliable sources of actual core cost and cost per kilogram of highly enriched uranium (HEU) put the core sizes of Green Bamboo and Orange Herald as 98 kg and 125 kg respectively, although some other published (and unverified) sources claim lower figures of 87 kg and 117 kg respectively. This design was tested on 31 May 1957 on Malden Island, yielding 720 kt.

Ultimately the decision was made to abandon Green Bamboo in favour of the true thermonuclear devices, being developed as the "Granite" series. The first Granite tests were carried out as part of Operation Grapple during May and June 1957. The first, Short Granite, was a failure, generating only 300 kt from an expected yield of around 1 Mt. Plans to test a second identical device, Green Granite, were cancelled as a result. Orange Herald was next, delivering 720 to 800 kt, as expected, making it the largest fission device ever tested. A slightly modified Short Granite was then tested as Purple Granite, but also failed, delivering the same 300 kt.

The abandonment of Green Bamboo and the Granite failures left a capability gap. An emergency capability weapon to fill that gap was devised from elements of both Green Bamboo and Orange Herald; being known as Knobkerry, or Green Grass, and the Interim Megaton Weapon. There were also other factors involved in the decision to build an Interim Megaton Weapon. One was that by 1957 the UK HEU production programme was producing more HEU than required. The Chiefs of Staff were reluctant to see it continue to languish in stores, unused for weapons, when it was being produced at great cost.

The Green Grass warhead containing perhaps 70–86 kg of HEU (although there are no reliable declassified sources for this figure) was therefore hurriedly produced and installed in a modified Blue Danube casing, to be known as Violet Club, until a better solution based on the Yellow Sun casing could be produced, known then with Green Grass installed, as Yellow Sun Mk.1. Only five Violet Club weapons were produced, known by the RAF description of Bomb, Aircraft, HE 9,000 lb HC, and they were stripped of their Green Grass warheads for transfer to the better casings when these became available.

== Design features ==
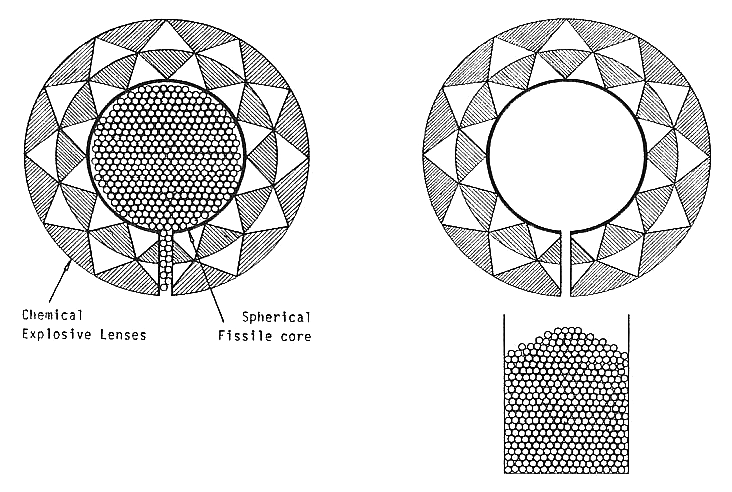
Schematic of the steel ball bearing arrangement common to Green Grass, Green Bamboo and Orange Herald warheads. The internal and external diameters can be computed from the 450 kg weight of the steel balls. First published in Synergy Magazine, published Southampton, UK, No3, 2003

Violet Club (and to a lesser degree Yellow Sun Mk.1) was not considered a satisfactory design and suffered from numerous design defects. An implosion design, the fissile core of the weapon was a hollow sphere of highly enriched uranium (HEU) which was surrounded by a high-explosive supercharge and 72-lens implosion system. The HEU core was greater than one uncompressed critical mass and to maintain it in a sub-critical condition AWRE fashioned it into a hollow thin-walled sphere. The HEU sphere was collapsed inwards by the supercharge and 72 explosive lenses. However, a fire in the bomb store or a traffic collision on the airfield could easily lead to a partial crushing or collapse of the unremovable uranium shell, and in turn a spontaneous nuclear chain reaction. AWRE responded by inserting (through a hole in the shell) a rubber bag, and filled this with 20,000 steel ball bearings of 0.375 inches (9.5 mm), weighing around 70 kilograms (150 lb). Subsequently, the number of these steel balls was increased to 133,000, with a reduction in size to approx 5 millimetres (0.20 in) diameter. The balls were retained in the device by sealing the hole with a plastic bung.

The steel balls were intended to prevent a nuclear detonation even if the explosives fired accidentally, or in any conceivable accident. (Note: The US Mk-18 uranium bomb tested at Ivy King with a yield of 500 kt had a similar safety design: the hollow center was filled with a chain made from aluminum and boron which was pulled out to arm the bomb.) The ball bearings had to be removed through the hole in the bomb casing during flight preparation, and after the bomb was winched into the aircraft. The ball bearings then had to be re-inserted into the lowered and upturned bomb before transport back to the bomb store. Without the ball bearings installed, these weapons were armed and live, and too dangerous to be allowed to fly on exercises. Bomber Command exercises demonstrated that flight preparation followed by a scramble take-off could not be reduced below thirty minutes, and on exercises in bad weather and at night a ninety-minute scramble was the norm. At least one accident, dated 1960, was reported in the press when the plastic bung was removed and 133,000 steel ball bearings spilled onto the aircraft hangar floor, leaving the bomb armed and vulnerable. The Royal Air Force were so nervous of the outcome of a fire in storage that permission was sought to store the bombs inverted, so that a loss of the plastic bung could not end with the steel balls on the floor, leaving the HEU unprotected against a subsequent explosion. Even without the partial nuclear detonation feared by the RAF, there was "a risk of catastrophe".

AWRE's trickery with the steel balls had other unintended outcomes. Even an event as inconsequential as early morning frost was an issue. Violet Club could be loaded into a bomber for up to thirty days on standby while parked overnight on a remote base where the bomb could get very cold. If the steel balls froze together inside the bomb cavity and could not be removed, the bomb was useless. AWRE's solution was to fit the bomb with an electric blanket. Because the bombs were armed before flight, the take-off was hazardous; the bombs could not be jettisoned, and landing with an armed bomb on return to base was too hazardous to contemplate. As a consequence, Violet Club could not be used on an airborne alert, or even flown to a remote dispersal base.

Other design flaws centred on a requirement for a strip-down and inspection at six-monthly intervals; this took three weeks per weapon using AWRE civilian staff. The unstable nature of the bomb required that the work be done in-situ at RAF facilities, causing considerable disruption to operational duties. There were three main reasons for the strip-down and these were deterioration of the rubber bag, corrosion of the steel balls, and deterioration of the HE, which was prone to cracking. Replacement of a weapon's HE would cost the RAF in excess of £5,200 in 1959, equivalent to £150,000 in 2024.

Green Grass/Violet Club was the first UK-deployed weapon to dispense with the crude polonium and beryllium impact or crush type initiators used in Fat Man and other early US weapons together with the British Blue Danube and Red Beard. Instead it used an electronic neutron initiator (ENI) known as Blue Stone. This had the great advantage of being adjustable, allowing the neutron burst to be triggered at precisely the right moment. The burst heights of Green Grass were optimized for either maximum overpressure without allowing fireball contact with the ground, or to maximise the ground area subjected to a 6 psi overpressure; respectively 3,500 feet (1,100 m) and 6,200 feet (1,900 m) above ground level A barometric fuze was used, backed-up by an adjustable clockwork timer fuze with impact fuses as a final fail-safe. Most of these mechanisms originated from Blue Danube although the radar altimeter fuze was omitted. The electrical power for these fuzing mechanisms and the firing mechanisms of the 72-lens, 45-inch (110 cm) implosion device came from lead-acid accumulators located in the tail of the Blue Danube casing. These were commercially sourced six-volt motorcycle batteries.

== Controversy ==
Green Grass struggled to meet the Chiefs of Staff requirement for an Interim Megaton [yield] Weapon. It was never tested, and initially, AWRE estimated its yield at 500 kt based on the Orange Herald test of 720kt, and non-nuclear tests of the HE implosion sphere fitted with non-fissile cores. A Mr. Challens of AWRE who later became the Director of AWRE then claimed to the Air Staff that:

A weapon of one half megaton was considered to be in the megaton range.

This play-on-words later returned to haunt AWRE when later estimates revised the yield to 400kt. Challens also stated on behalf of AWRE that

AWRE were almost completely sure that a nuclear explosion would not occur if the balls are in, - but in the absence of trial proof, he could not guarantee it. (Note: The Americans had the resources to perform such safety trials, see Nuclear weapon design § One-point safety)

The Royal Air Force was not amused, with Bomber Command Staff officers minuting their seniors with remarks like this one.

This [minute] means that Violet Club and Yellow Sun Mk.1 are not "in the megaton range" at all, notwithstanding the extraordinary measures taken, and costs involved for what we had thought to be a megaton capability. This ... lead me to the belief that production of Green Grass be curtailed. I cannot imagine any commercial organisation continuing to buy a device that so patently fails to meet the requirement, or to be misled without protest as the Air Ministry has so consistently been [misled] by AWRE.

Senior levels of the RAF believed they had been sold a lemon. Further, the weapon was of uncertain safety in the hands of the inexperienced RAF.

Aircraft engines must not be run with Violet Club loaded on the aircraft with the safety device [of steel balls] in place. The engines must not be started until the weapon is prepared for an actual operational sortie [to prevent the steel balls vibrating like a bag of jellybeans].

... uncertainty exists about the effects of movement with the balls inserted.

The fifth and last Violet Club weapon was due for delivery to the RAF by the end of May 1959 and all were withdrawn by 1960, but in their Yellow Sun Mk.1 form they survived until 1963, when all had been replaced with Yellow Sun Mk.2 with Red Snow warheads installed. They were only used by the Avro Vulcan bomber.

== Conclusion ==
These very large and dirty fission bombs were the largest pure-fission bombs deployed (Note: The comparable US Mk-18 / Ivy King device was never deployed.) by any state, and unlike their predecessors, Blue Danube and Red Beard, they used HEU as a fissile material rather than plutonium, the reason being primarily economic. The cost of HEU to the Royal Air Force was (at 1958 to 1959 prices) £19,200 per kg, with plutonium priced at £143,000 per kg. Although a HEU weapon needed more fissile material for a given yield than a plutonium weapon, a saving per weapon was of the order of £22.7M at 2006 prices. Thirty-seven Green Grass warheads were built (twelve as Violet Club) saving the Treasury £840M. The influence of the Treasury on weapons procurement should not be underestimated: it reaches even into weapons design. Clearly, there were economic benefits in building large and dirty U-235 fission bombs, rather than cleaner, but more expensive plutonium weapons, especially given the shortage of plutonium. By 1958 Britain's accumulated production of plutonium was only 472.2 kg and a proportion of that was bartered to the United States in exchange for HEU and other items. Up to 1958, British output of HEU was only 860 kg, while the United States supplied the UK with approximately seven tons of HEU from their less costly production process. So HEU used for Green Grass was purchased cheaply from the U.S. while selling to the U.S. the unwanted and high-priced weapons-grade plutonium.

Knobkerry, alias Green Grass, alias Interim Megaton Weapon, alias Violet Club and Yellow Sun Mk.1, had one other distinction. It was the last entirely British nuclear weapon deployed with the UK Armed Services. The British Operation Grapple thermonuclear weapon tests at Christmas Island in 1957–58 were the end of this evolution. There were no more wholly home-grown designs. Britain never deployed a true thermonuclear weapon of wholly home-grown design. All the weapons tested at Operation Grapple were abandoned, because AWRE no longer needed them, although some of their features were undoubtedly incorporated into later weapons. These Granite-type devices were all experimental devices, needing to be developed further into reliable Service-engineered warheads at considerable cost in time and money. The U.S. designs offered after 1958 were fully tested and engineered, and cheap to produce. They were manufactured in Britain from British materials and U.S. blueprints. They were British property and there were no American political constraints on their use, they were a favourable deal for the Treasury, and Violet Club and Yellow Sun Mk.1 bridged the gap until the American designs could be manufactured.

== See also ==
- Ivy King, the largest pure-fission nuclear bomb ever tested by the United States.
- MR 31, the largest pure-fission plutonium weapon ever built.
