= Blue Stone (neutron initiator) =

Blue Stone (a Rainbow Code) or Unit 386D ENI was the electronic neutron initiator for the first British operational high-yield strategic nuclear weapon, Violet Club.
