= Toss bombing =

Bombing technique

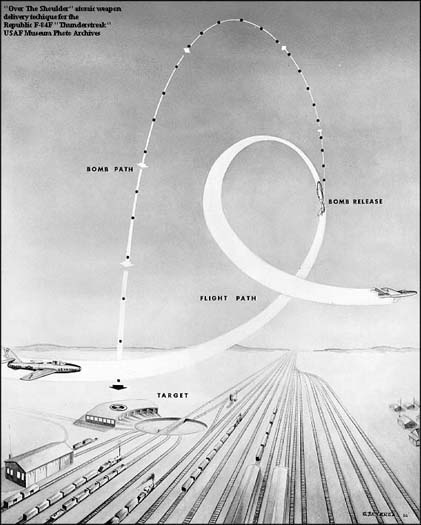
“Over-the-shoulder” delivery

Toss bombing (sometimes known as loft bombing, and by the U.S. Air Force as the Low Altitude Bombing System, or LABS) is a method of bombing where the attacking aircraft pulls upward when releasing its bomb load to compensate for the weapons' gravity drop in flight. Starting the payload's ballistic path with an upward vector buys additional time.

The purpose of toss bombing is to allow an aircraft to bomb a target without flying directly over it. The technique both avoids overflying a heavily defended target and distances the attacking aircraft from the blast effects of either conventional or nuclear weapons.

== Bomb tactics ==
Toss bombing is adaptable to multiple tactics, including the pop-up, level toss, dive toss, and over-the-shoulder delivery.

=== Pop-up ===
In pop-up bombing, the pilot approaches from low altitude in level flight and on cues from the computer pulls up at the last moment to release the bomb. Release usually occurs between 20° and 75° above the horizontal, causing the bomb to be tossed upward and forward, much like an underarm throw of a ball.

=== Level toss ===
Although "pop-up" bombing is generally characterized by its low-level approach, the same technique of a toss starting from level flight can be used at any altitude when it is not desirable to overfly the target. Additional altitude at release gives the bomb additional time of flight and range, at the cost (in the case of unguided munitions) of accuracy due to windage and the increased effect of a slight deviation in flight path.

=== Dive toss ===
The Dive-toss delivery technique was the first "toss" bombing method developed after WWII at the US Navy's rocket development center at Inyokern, California, in 1947 as a method to attack heavily defended targets without unduly endangering the attacking aircraft. Although toss bombing might seem the direct opposite to dive bombing, where the plane pitches downward to aim at its target, toss bombing is often performed with a short dive before the bomber raises its nose and releases its bomb. This variant is known as "dive tossing". This gives both the bomb and aircraft extra momentum, thereby helping the aircraft regain altitude after the release, and also ensuring that airspeed at the calculated release point is still sufficient to get the bomb to the target.

=== Over-the-shoulder ===
A more dynamic variant of toss bombing, called over-the-shoulder bombing, or the LABS (Low Altitude Bombing System) maneuver (known to pilots as the "idiot's loop"), is a particular kind of loft bombing where the bomb is released past the vertical so it is tossed back toward the target. This tactic was first made public on 7 May 1957 at Eglin AFB, when a B-47 entered its bombing run at low altitude, pulled up sharply (3.5 g) into a half loop, released its bomb under automatic control at a predetermined point in its climb, then executed a half roll, completing a maneuver similar to an Immelmann turn or Half Cuban Eight. The bomb continued upward for some time in a high arc before falling on a target which was a considerable distance from its point of release. In the meantime, the maneuver had allowed the bomber to change direction and distance itself from the target.

Author and retired USAF F-84 pilot Richard Bach describes such an attack in his book Stranger to the Ground:

The last red-roofed village flashes below me, and the target, a pyramid of white barrels, is just visible at the end of its run-in line. Five hundred knots. Switch down, button pressed. Timers begin their timing, circuits are alerted for the drop. Inch down to treetop altitude. I do not often fly at 500 knots on the deck, and it is apparent that I am moving quickly. The barrels inflate. I see that their white paint is flaking. And the pyramid streaks beneath me. Back on the stick smoothly firmly to read four G on the accelerometer and center the needles of the indicator that is only used in nuke weapon drops and center them and hold it there and I'll bet those computers are grinding their little hearts out and all I can see is sky in the windscreen hold the G's keep the needles centered there's the sun going beneath me and WHAM.

My airplane rolls hard to the right and tucks more tightly into her loop and strains ahead even though we are upside down. The Shape has released me more than I have released it. The little white barrels are now six thousand feet directly beneath my canopy. I have no way to tell if it was a good drop or not. That was decided back with the charts and graphs and the dividers and the angles. I kept the needles centered, the computers did their task automatically, and the Device is on its way.

== Tactical use ==
Toss bombing is generally used by pilots whenever it is not desirable to overfly the target with the aircraft at an altitude sufficient for dive-bombing or level bombing. Such cases include heavy anti-air defenses such as AAA and SAMs, when deploying powerful weapons such as 2,000 lb (910 kg) "iron bombs" or even tactical nuclear bombs, and the use of limited-aspect targeting devices for guided munitions.

To counter air defenses en route to the target, remaining at a low altitude for as long as possible allows the bomber to avoid radar and visual tracking and the launch envelope of older missile systems designed to be fired at targets overflying the missile site. However, a level pass at the target at low altitude will not only expose the aircraft to short-range defenses surrounding the target, but will place the aircraft in the bomb's blast radius. By executing a "pop-up" loft, on the other hand, the pilot releases the munition well outside the target area, out of range of air defenses. After release, the pilot can either dive back to low altitude or maintain the climb, in either case generally executing a sharp turn or "slice" away from the target. The blast produced by powerful munitions is thus (hopefully) avoided.

The value of toss-bombing was increased with the introduction of precision-guided munitions such as the laser-guided bomb. Previous "dumb bombs" required a very high degree of pilot and fire control computer precision to loft the bomb accurately to the target. Unguided loft bombing also generally called for the use of a larger bomb than would be necessary for a direct hit, in order to generate a larger blast that would destroy the target even if the bomb did not hit accurately due to windage or computer/pilot error. Laser-targeting (and other methods like GPS as used in the JDAM system) allows the bomb to correct minor deviations from the intended ballistic path after it has been released, making toss-bombing as accurate as level bombing while still providing most of the advantages of toss-bombing using unguided munitions. However, the targeting pods used to deliver guided munitions generally have a limit to their field of view; most specifically, the pod usually cannot look behind the aircraft at more than a certain angle. Lofting the bomb allows the pilot to keep the target in front of the aircraft and thus within the targeting pod's field of view for as long as possible.

"Dive-tossing" is generally used at moderate altitude (to allow for the dive) when the target, for whatever reason, cannot be designated precisely by radar. A target for instance may present too small a signature to be visible on radar (such as the entrance to an underground bunker) or may be indistinguishable in a group of radar returns. The pilot can in this case use a special "boresight" mode that allows the pilot to designate a target by pointing his aircraft directly at it. For a target on the ground, this means entering a dive. Thus designated, the pilot can then begin a climb, lofting the bomb at the target from a distance and regaining lost altitude at the same time.

== Technology ==
Due to the intense pilot workload involved with flying and entering the window of opportunity, some aircraft are equipped with a "Toss Bomb Computer" (in US nuclear delivery, a part of the Low Altitude Bombing System) that enables the pilot to release the bomb at the correct angle. The Toss Bomb Computer takes airspeed inputs from the aircraft's pitot system, altitude inputs from the static system, attitude inputs from the gyroscopic system and inputs from weapons selectors signifying the type of bomb to calculate the appropriate release point of the ordnance. Instead of triggering the release directly, the pilot instead "consents" to release the weapon, then begins a steady climb. The computer then calculates the desired ballistic path, and when that path will be produced by the current aircraft attitude and airspeed, the computer releases the bomb.

During the Second World War the engineers at Saab developed the first bomb sight for toss bombing. It was a mechanical computer that did the necessary calculations. It was first used in the Saab 17 and was standard on all Saab fighters up to and including Saab 32 Lansen. It was also sold to France, Switzerland, Denmark and USA and was used in for instance the Boeing B-47 Stratojet.

While deployed in Europe with NATO, RCAF CF-104 fighter-bombers carried a Toss Bomb Computer until their nuclear role was eliminated by the Canadian government effective 1 January 1972.

The same computational solutions used in the LABS system are now incorporated into two of the major bombing modes (the computer-controlled CCRP and a dedicated visually oriented "Dive-Toss" mode) of the Fire Control Computer of modern strike fighters such as the F-15E and F-16. As with LABS, the pilot designates their desired impact point, then consents to release while executing a climb, and the computer controls the actual release of the bomb. The integration into the FCC simplifies the pilot's workload by allowing the same bombing mode (CCRP) to be used for level, dive and loft bombing, providing similar cues in the pilot's displays regardless of the tactics used, since the computer simply sees it as the release point getting closer.

== See also ==
- Skip bombing
- Tactical bombing
- Strategic bombing
- Carpet bombing
