= Blue Danube (nuclear weapon) =

First British operational nuclear weapon

A Blue Danube bomb

Blue Danube was the first operational British nuclear weapon. It also went by a variety of other names, including Smallboy, the Mk.1 Atom Bomb, Special Bomb and OR.1001, a reference to the Operational Requirement it was built to fill.

The RAF V bomber force was initially meant to use Blue Danube as their primary armament at a time when the first hydrogen bomb had not been detonated, and the British military planners still believed that an atomic war could be fought and won using atomic bombs of similar yield to the Hiroshima bomb. For that reason the stockpile planned was for up to 800 bombs with yields of 10-12 kilotons. V-bomber bomb bays were sized to carry Blue Danube, the smallest-size nuclear bomb that was possible to be designed given the technology of the day (1947) when their plans were formulated.

== Design ==
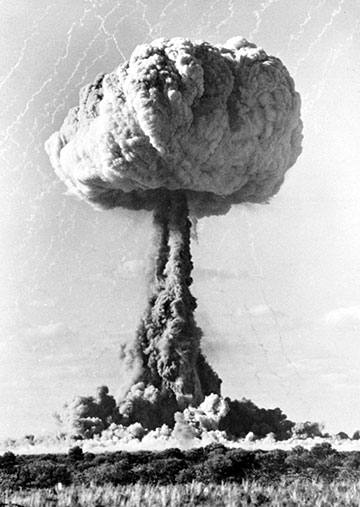
Explosion of a Blue Danube warhead (codenamed Buffalo R2/Marcoo, fired on 4 October 1956) during the British nuclear tests at Maralinga

Initial designs for the Blue Danube warhead were based on research derived from Hurricane, the first British fission device (which was neither designed nor employed as a weapon), tested in 1952 at the Montebello Islands in Western Australia. The actual Blue Danube warhead was proof-tested during Operation Buffalo in Autumn of 1956 at the Marcoo (surface) and Kite (air-drop) nuclear trials at Maralinga, Australia, by a team of Australian, British and Canadian scientists.

During the Kite test on 11 October 1956, a Vickers Valiant of No. 49 Squadron RAF piloted by Squadron Leader Ted Flavell became the first British aircraft to drop a live atomic bomb.

Blue Danube added a ballistically shaped casing to the existing Hurricane physics package, with four flip-out fins to ensure a stable ballistic trajectory from the planned release height of 50,000 ft. It initially used a plutonium core, but all service versions were modified to use a composite plutonium/uranium-235 (U-235) core, and a version was also tested with a uranium-only core. The service chiefs insisted on a yield of between 10 and 12 kt for two reasons: firstly, to minimise usage of scarce and expensive fissile material; and secondly, to minimise the risk of predetonation, a phenomenon then little understood, and the primary reason for using a composite core of concentric shells of plutonium and U-235. Although there were many plans for versions with higher yields, some up to 40 kt, none were developed, largely because of the scarcity of fissile materials, and there is no evidence that any were seriously contemplated.

== Deployment ==
The first Blue Danube was delivered to stockpile at RAF Wittering in November 1953 although there were no aircraft equipped to carry it until the following year. No. 1321 Flight RAF was established at RAF Wittering in April 1954 as a Vickers Valiant unit to integrate the Blue Danube nuclear weapon into RAF service. The Short Sperrin was also able to carry the Blue Danube and had been ordered as a fall-back option, in case the V-bomber projects proved unsuccessful.

Declassified archives show that 58 Blue Danubes were produced before production shifted in 1958 to the smaller and more capable Red Beard weapon, which could accept the Blue Danube fissile core and also could be carried by much smaller aircraft. It seems unlikely that all 58 Blue Danube weapons were operational at any given time. Blue Danube was retired in 1962.

Bomb storage facilities for the weapon were built at RAF Barnham in Suffolk and RAF Faldingworth in Lincolnshire. These sites were built specifically to store bomb components in small buildings called 'hutches' with the high explosive elements of the weapons stored in dedicated storage areas. The storage facilities were probably closed in 1963 and put up for sale in 1966, the Barnham site becoming an industrial estate. The site at Barnham is a scheduled monument.

== Problems ==
Major deficiencies with Blue Danube included the use of unreliable lead-acid accumulators to supply power to the firing circuits and radar altimeters. Later weapons used the more reliable ram-air turbine-generators or thermal batteries. Blue Danube was not engineered as a weapon equipped to withstand the rigours of service life; it was a scientific experiment on a gigantic scale, which needed to be re-engineered to meet service requirements, resulting in Red Beard. The same could be said of the third U.S. atomic bomb, Fat Man, which was quickly re-engineered after World War II.

== Legacy ==
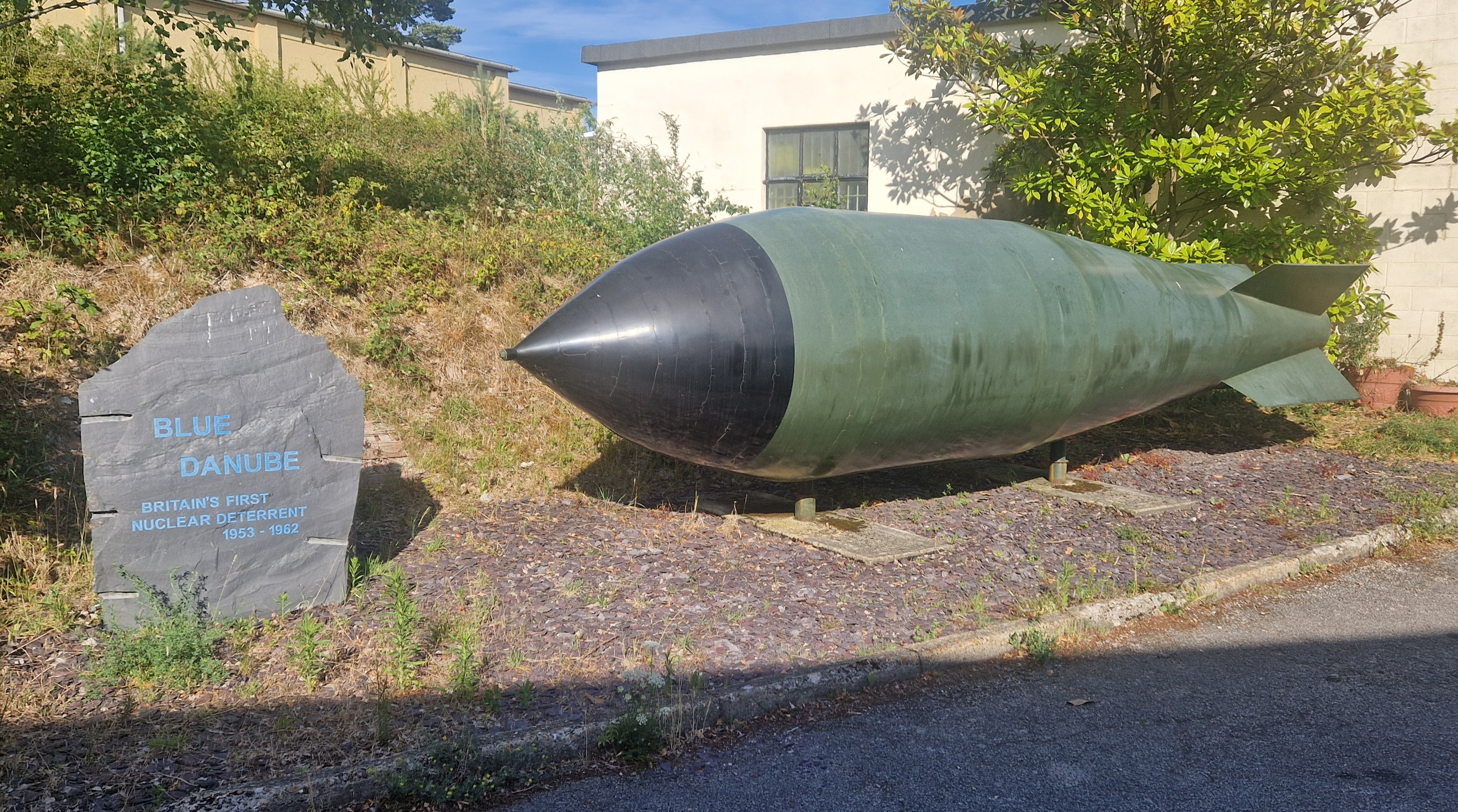
Replica Blue Danube nuclear weapon at Gorse Industrial Estate

Parts of a Blue Danube could be viewed by the public at the Sellafield Visitors Centre in Cumbria. This centre closed in 2008. A replica Blue Danube bomb is displayed in the Gorse Industrial Estate (the former site of the RAF Barnham facilities) in Suffolk.

== See also ==
- Rainbow Codes

== Bibliography ==
- Leitch, Andy. "V-Force Arsenal: Weapons for the Valiant, Victor and Vulcan". Air Enthusiast No. 107, September/October 2003. pp. 52–59. ISSN 0143-5450
- Moore, Richard: "A Glossary of Nuclear Weapons". pub: Prospero, Journal of the British Rocketry Oral History Project (BROHP) Spring 2004.
- Dr Richard Moore, University of Southampton, Mountbatten Centre for International Studies
- Various declassified official files at The National Archives, London.
