= Operational Requirement =

An Operational Requirement, commonly abbreviated OR, was a United Kingdom (UK) Air Ministry document setting out the required characteristics for a future (i.e., as-yet unbuilt) military aircraft or weapon system.

The numbered OR would describe what intended role the aircraft would be used for, e.g., bomber, fighter, etc., or what type of weapon was required, e.g., gun, armament, bomb type, etc.

In conjunction with any official specification, prospective manufacturers would then choose whether to design an aircraft or weapon for this particular requirement.

Operational Requirements were carried over with the dissolution of the Air Ministry and the creation of the Ministry of Defence (MoD).

== Other requirements ==
An Experimental Requirement (ER) was for an aircraft for research purposes; e.g., ER.100 in support of development of the English Electric Lightning.

== See also ==
- List of Operational Requirements for nuclear weapons
- List of Air Ministry specifications
