= Peter Vaughan-Fowler =

Officer of the Royal Air Force (1923 – 1994)

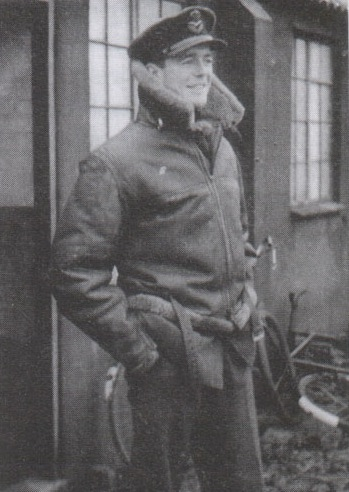
- Peter Vaughan-Fowler
- Born: 18 January 1923; Lahore, India
- Died: 24 April 1994 (aged 71); Oxford, England
- Military career
- Allegiance: United Kingdom
- Branch: Royal Air Force
- Service years: 1940–1975
- Rank: Group Captain
- Units: No. 161 Squadron RAF; No. 21 Squadron RAF; No. 148 Squadron RAF; No. 213 Squadron RAF
- Conflicts: Second World War
- Awards: Royal Victorian Order; Distinguished Service Order; Distinguished Flying Cross & Bar; Air Force Cross

Peter Vaughan-Fowler, CVO, DSO, DFC & Bar, AFC (18 January 1923 – 24 April 1994) was an officer who served in the Royal Air Force. He is best known for his work as a "special duties" pilot, supporting the SOE and the SIS, carrying agents to and from occupied France.

== Early life ==
Vaughan-Fowler was born in Lahore, in what was then India on 18 January 1923. He came from a family of aviators. His father, Guy Vaughan-Fowler, had been a naval aviator during The Great War, attaining the rank of Group Captain. He had taken Peter up in an Avro 504 biplane for his first flight when he was still a young boy. Peter's older brother had also been a pilot.

On the outbreak of the Second World War he was a 17 year old still at school at the Imperial Service College. A year later he enlisted in the Royal Air Force Volunteer Reserve at Cranwell, where he earned the rating of Leading Aircraftman. While there he volunteered for pilot training. The youngest pilot in his squadron, he was regarded by his fellow pilots as having exceptional aircraft handling skills. On 15 November 1941 he was made Pilot Officer.

== 161 Squadron ==
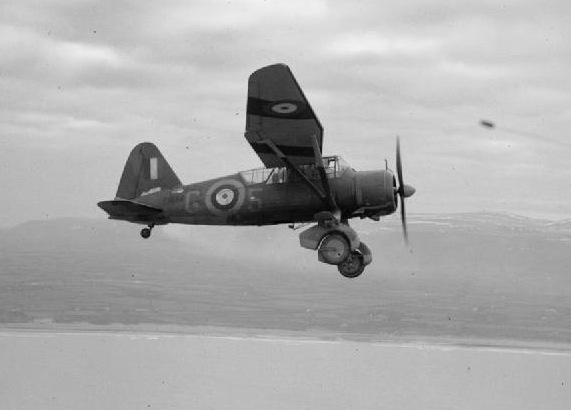
The Westland Lysander

After completing pilot training Vaughan-Fowler was assigned to 161 (Special Duties) Squadron. The posting was quite unusual, for the squadron was a secret unit that flew insertion missions at night into occupied France. The pilots were required to be experienced and have logged at least 250 hours of night flying. Vaughan-Fowler was a new pilot, whose total flying experience was only 250 hours, none of which had been completed at night. Apparently the flying discipline and control he demonstrated in flying school earned him the recommendation to 161 Squadron, who elected to try to train him to be a pick-up pilot. At the time he was only 19 years old.

161 Squadron had formed just two months earlier by hiving off the Lysander flight from the original Royal Air Force Special Duties Service unit, 138 Squadron. The clandestine squadron had the role of delivering SOE and SIS agents, wireless operators, wireless equipment and weapons to assist the resistance. The squadron was commanded by Edward Fielden, an experienced pilot who had been the CO of the King's Flight. 161 Squadron's 'A Flight' was made up of 6 Lysanders, with Guy Lockhart as its commanding officer. 'A Flight' undertook the pick-up operations. At the time Vaughan-Fowler joined the squadron in April 1942 the squadron had just moved to the secret airfield at Tempsford, located in the Bedfordshire countryside. The squadron was building up its capability, training new pilots and new agents to manage the fields in France. These special agents were known as 'operators'.

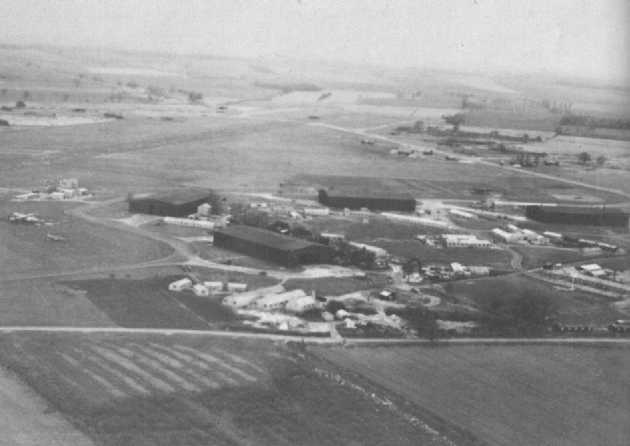
While with 161 Squadron Vaughan-Fowler was stationed at the secretive RAF Tempsford

The primary aircraft used in these operations was the Lysander. The aircraft's exceptional short-field performance made it the ideal aircraft for landing on small, unimproved airstrips behind enemy lines to perform pick-up operations.

This flying of aircraft at night to small fields in France with no navigational aid was a new undertaking, fraught with danger. They had to fly to a small field in the middle of a darkened countryside. If they found the field, then the field's operator would exchange an agreed to code letter in Morse. If correct the operator would direct his team to light three small flashlights. These did not illuminate the ground, but gave the pilot an idea where he was to put the aircraft down. As the pilot got close to the ground he would illuminate his landing light. There was always the fear of the Gestapo arriving and capturing the pilot and operator's crew while the aircraft was on the ground, or worse, landing and finding the Gestapo waiting rather than the Resistance.

Vaughan-Fowler practiced navigational flying over England without radio assistance or navigational aid, initially by day and then by night. He also trained in night landings, using the tiny indicator lights. Pilots and operators were trained at the false airfield at "RAF Somersham". There they would practice signaling to each other in Morse code. The operators would lay out a flare path and the pilots would bring their Lysander down to land, change passengers and take off in the dark. The last step in his training was to complete a cross-country trip over France without passengers. He was told the location of the target he was to reach but not that it was a POW camp. Fowler flew towards his target over a blacked out France, and to his astonishment found the target was a rectangular compound, with a wired periphery that was extremely brightly lit. Returning to base, he met the scowling Guy Lockhart to debrief him on the flight. As he gave his description of the target he noted the trace of a smile break into the corners of Lockhart's mouth. He had made the grade and was now an operational pilot.

The Lysander flight put on their pick-up operations for two weeks each month, during the moon period. For this time period the A Flight of 161 Squadron (Lysanders) would move forward to RAF Tangmere. Tangmere is on the coast, 100 miles south of Tempsford. The move extended the reach of the Lysander into Europe. Vaughan-Fowler's first successful operation was on the night of 26/27 October during the October moon period, when he brought out two agents to a field near Mâcon, bringing two others back with him to RAF Tangmere.

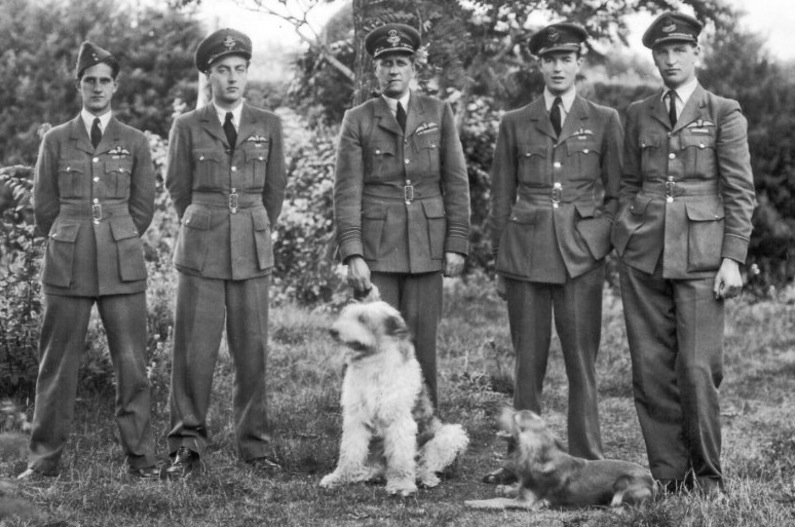
Moved forward for the "moon period", the 'A Flight' at RAF Tangmere: Jimmy McCairns, Hugh Verity, CO Charles Pickard, Peter Vaughan-Fowler and Frank Rymills

The squadron received new flight leader Hugh Verity on 15 November 1942. Once he was trained he would take over for Guy Lockhart. On meeting Vaughan-Fowler, Verity observed: "He was only 19 years old, 6' 2" tall, and remarkably good looking. His father had been one of the first naval aviators before the World War I. I wondered if his good hands with an aeroplane had been inherited. He was a laconic young man. His main leisure pursuit was listening to the jazz of the day, for which he had a deep interest."

The hardest part of the job was navigating to the target field. This was accomplished by flying a route of a series of known features, called pinpoints, which enabled the pilot to know where he was. Routes to and from the target field was by navigating off a map held on the pilot's knees. No electronic navigational aids were used in the Lysanders. The flights were always flown during the two week period each month when the moon was full enough to give off a bit of light. The target field was a known distance and direction from the final pinpoint. Weather, particularly cloud or fog, hid the navigational pinpoints and was the largest difficulty to overcome. Among Vaughan-Fowler's passengers on these flights included Jean Moulin and the general Charles Delestraint, head of the Armée Secrète. Once the airplane touched down in France the pilot was in a vulnerable position. Time on the ground was kept to a minimum, as it exposed the pilot to the risk of being captured and questioned by the Gestapo.

One limitation of the Lysander was that there was only room in the back for two passengers. If more people were needed to be picked up they would have to use more than one aircraft. This was a problem, as each aircraft flew in radio silence, and once up in the night sky they were almost impossible to see from another aircraft. To use two aircraft would mean they would both have to navigate to the target independently and arrive at about the same time. Delays between the two aircraft would pose a risk to the second. The landing of the first aircraft would alert the defenses to their activity. Getting both aircraft down and back up airborne again had to be completed as quickly as possible. The second aircraft was always at higher risk. On 17 November Vaughan-Fowler took part in the squadron's first attempt at a double Lysander pick up, when CO Guy Lockhart and Vaughan-Fowler attempted to reach a field at Les Lagnys south of Vatan in central France. Poor weather made it impossible to locate the field. Two nights later a second attempt by the two pilots was successful.

While with 161 Squadron Vaughan-Fowler became friends with another young pilot, Jimmy McCairns. McCairns had been a Spitfire pilot and flew out of Tangmere with Douglas Bader. He was shot down over northern France in a circus op, made it back to England and took up with 161 Squadron to do pick-up flights. A bit nervous about making the grade, he had committed himself to the "Bridger method" of night navigational flying when a young pilot joined their small team. Said McCairns: "I found myself becoming firm friends with another pilot, a young, impetuous flyer named Peter Vaughan-Fowler. Peter was born to fly. His father was a RAF officer and flew in the last war. His brother, after becoming a Cranwell overall sports champion, had been killed in an aircraft in 1932. One could see that Peter took to the air like a duck to water. His first ops were rather erratic. He missed the first trip, won on the next, lost on the third and was lucky on the following. Then he settled down and produced the most brilliant flying and the best results that we could wish for. No field was too difficult, no target too far, and weather never defeated him."

On the night of 13/14 February 1943 Vaughan-Fowler made a successful pick-up of Charles Delestraint. He had been an officer in the French army, and in England met secretly with Charles de Gaulle in London, where he was asked to lead the Armée Secrète. He returned to France, but was captured by the Gestapo a few months later, questioned and killed. On the night of 17/18 March 1943 Vaughan-Fowler completed a successful double operation near Poitiers with Bunny Rymills. In April he completed another double with McCairns on the night of 15/16. Vaughan-Fowler became noted for pulling off successful doubles. James 'Mac' McCairns was his most frequent pairing for these sorties.

Vaughan-Fowler's trips were largely uneventful, due to his careful preparation and nighttime navigational skills. On one insertion op he returned with two American aviators in back. They had left their base in east Anglia on a bombing mission three days earlier and had been shot down. It was the quickest recovery time for evading aircrew. Vaughan-Fowler did have a few unexpected moments. Once when flying a double Lysander operation with 'Bunny' Rymills on 17 March 1943, Vaughan-Fowler landed at the target field and was alarmed to see flames belching out of his engine's exhaust. He switched everything off but the flames persisted. He managed to put out the flames by ramming his 'Mae West' into the exhaust pipe. On departure, the engine started up but then cut out. One of the great fears of a pick up pilot was to be stuck in France. If your aircraft became bogged in mud or had a mechanical problem, it meant a long walk back at night, and staying low in a safe house to avoid the Gestapo during the day. Vaughan-Fowler started the engine again, got it airborne and returned safely to Tangmere. On another operation Vaughan-Fowler had checked out a new Lysander with a test flight during the day and had discovered no problems, but over France that night found six foot flames were belching out from the exhaust pipes. In an aircraft where they were only allowed a tiny penlight to read their maps, this felt rather like flying a signal torch. Nevertheless, he completed his mission. The next day his mechanic discovered the engine's timing had been off by 10 degrees.

Vaughan-Fowler completed a triple Lysander operation on 12/13 September when he teamed with Verity and 'Mac' to take eight 'Joes' out and eight more back. Time on the ground for the three aircraft from start to finish was only nine minutes. Vaughan-Fowler's last Lysander operation from Tangmere was a double operation with McCairns on the night of 18/19 September 1943. They flew to a field near Ambérac to pick up a number of agents. Vaughan-Fowler carried British SOE agent 'Tommy' Yeo-Thomas, known under the alias of the 'White Rabbit', as an outgoing passenger back to France on this operation.

Flying out of RAF Tangmere between October 1942 and the end of his tour in September 1943, Vaughan-Fowler completed twenty-one successful operations out of twenty-seven attempts. He was twice awarded the Distinguished Flying Cross during his time with 161 Squadron. He proved himself exceptionally skilled at this job and carried out more successful 'pick-up' operations in France than any other pilot.

== Flying combat ==
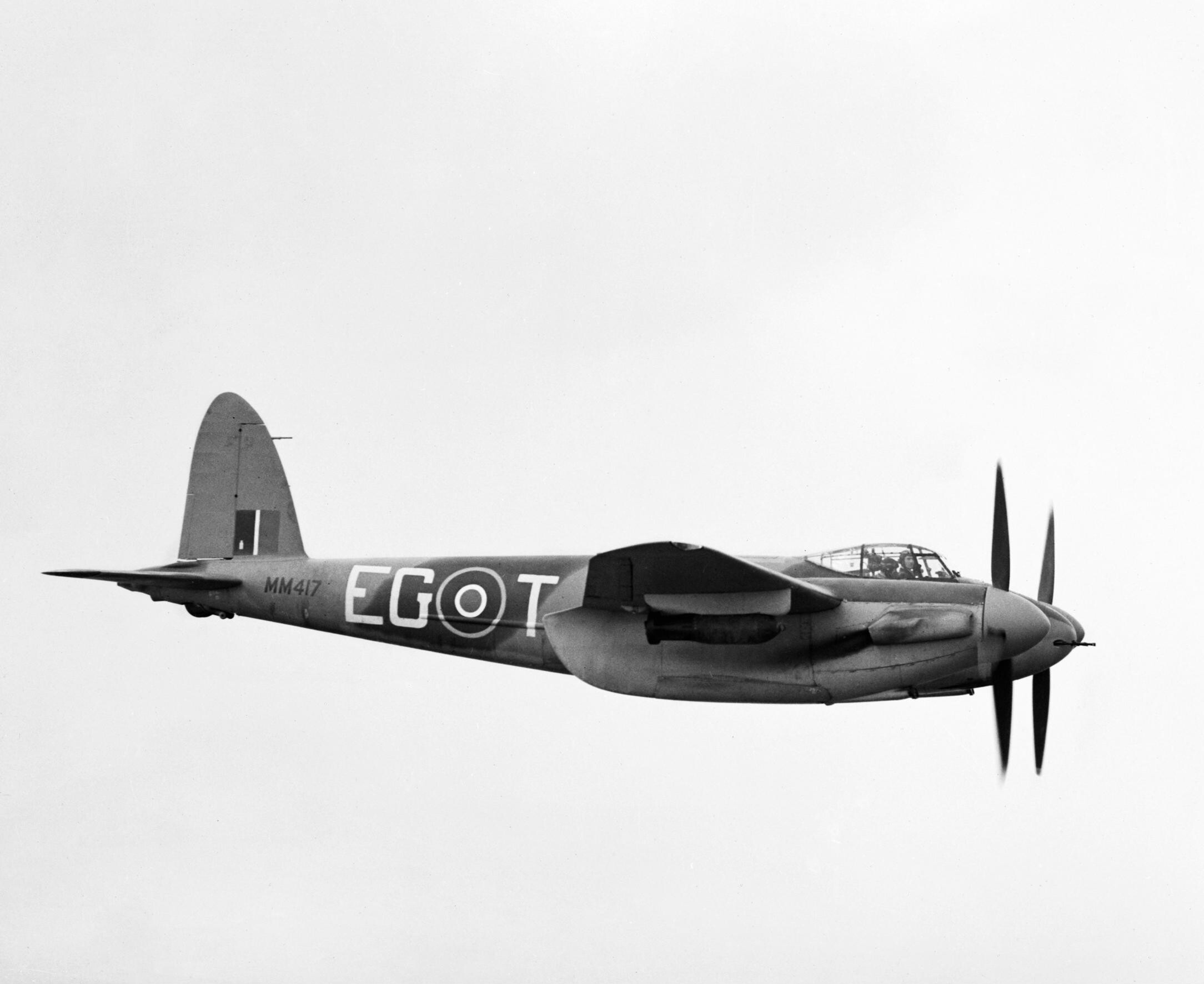
The de Havilland Mosquito

At the end of Vaughan-Fowler's tour with 161 Squadron he requested a transfer to another operational squadron, preferably one under command of Group Captain Pickard, whom he had flown under while at 161 Squadron. He was assigned to 21 Squadron, which was part of Pickard's 140 Wing. At the time Vaughan-Fowler's transfer 21 Squadron had converted to the de Havilland Mosquito and was flying intruder missions. These missions were put on to suppress German night fighter activities against Bomber Command. The Mosquitos would fly out at night to locate and orbit an airfield known to be in use by German night fighters. Vaughan-Fowler's night flying and navigational skills were useful in this endeavor. Just having the Mosquito in the air was a strong deterrent to German operations. As his plane neared the field the airfield lights would suddenly be turned off, and they would not launch as long as he was overhead. He was promoted to Flight Lieutenant in November 1943.

The usual practice was for pilots to rotate from an operational squadron to a training or administrative duty before they were rotated back to operations. After 60 operational flights the pilot's obligation to fly was fulfilled. However, Vaughan-Fowler loved to fly. After each of his tours he scrambled to get assigned to another squadron in a flying role. He was able to continue to fly operationally until the end of the war.

In January the group began training for a daylight raid against a French prison.

== Return to Special Duties ==
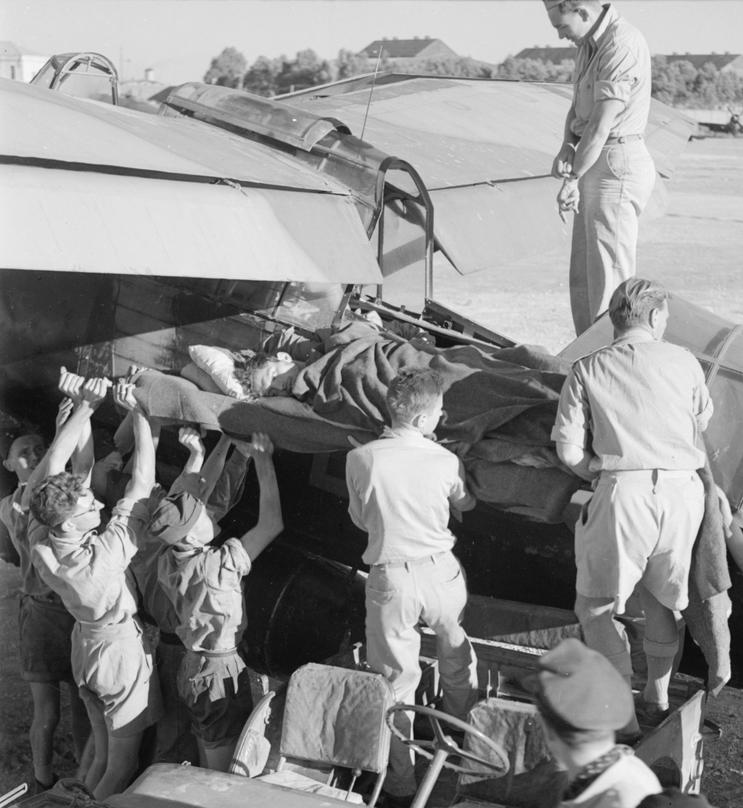
Captain John Giannaris, a Greek-speaking US Army officer wounded leading a team of Greek resistance fighters, arrives from the field on a 148 (SD) Lysander. He survived.

In February 1944 he was called back to Special Operations Executive work, to the Mediterranean theatre. Vaughan-Fowler arrived at Maison Blanche airfield near Algiers to set up a Lysander pick up flight for operations at bases in the Mediterranean area. They had been attached as a third flight to 148 Squadron at Brindisi. The squadron was largely equipped with Halifaxes, and prior to Vaughan-Fowler's arrival had been primarily responsible for parachuting men and supplies to partisans in Yugoslavia and Greece. A third flight was formed for 148 with Lysanders to operate as a pick-up flight, with Vaughan-Fowler as commanding officer. Vaughan-Fowler was sent to southern Italy with 4 Lysanders. He had three pilots that were in the process of training as pick up pilots. Jimmy McCairns was soon sent to join Vaughan-Fowler at Brindisi in the heel of Italy as Air Ministry representative and training instructor. Both he and Vaughan-Fowler expected to be flying to southern France, but were tasked with carrying out operations in Greece and Yugoslavia. In August 148 Squadron Halifaxes suffered heavy losses trying to supply the Poles during the Warsaw Uprising.

Following the Normandy landings the Lysanders were moved forward to Borgo Bastia and switched to operations in southern France. They soon were moved up to Calvi on Corsica, from which they continued to fly missions to France. On 4 June Vaughan-Fowler and Attenborough flew a double pick-up from Calvi to a field near Lyon, where they picked up 7, including Michel Pichard. The week before the invasion of southern France they were overloaded with requests. 148 Squadron completed another six Lysander flights from Corsica. Vaughan-Fowler flew four of these operations.

The last Lysander mission was put on during the night of 10/11 August 1944. The agent was an important leader of the resistance, who awaited pick up at a field in Pont de Vaux on the river Saône. Unlike a typical pick-up flight, this operation had to be flown on a moonless night. The mission was flown and successfully completed by Vaughan-Fowler. The Allied invasion of southern France followed four days later.

In December 1944 Vaughan-Fowler was made commanding officer of 213 Squadron, operating the P-51 Mustang fighter in a ground-attack role. At the conclusion of the war in Europe he was awarded the Distinguished Service Order in recognition of his contributions and leadership. Vaughan-Fowler remained in command of 213 Squadron until January 1946.

== After the war ==
At the end of the war the French government awarded Vaughan-Fowler the Croix de Guerre with Palm and appointed him a Chevalier de l' Ordre National de la Légion d'honneur for his contributions to the liberation of France. Vaughan-Fowler decided to remain in the Royal Air Force, and was awarded a permanent commission in September 1945. His temporary rank of Flight Lieutenant was made permanent in June 1946. Vaughan-Fowler was promoted to Squadron Leader in 1951. In the post-war RAF he was assigned a string of flying appointments, including the command of 247 Fighter Squadron and work with the Central Fighter Establishment. He was awarded the Air Force Cross in 1954.

Vaughan-Fowler was promoted to Wing Commander on 1 July 1957, and was posted to command RAF Wildenrath in Germany. He was then promoted to Group Captain and posted to Deputy Captain and Extra Equerry of the Queen's Flight. He next worked a staff job at Air Support Command, where he served as Senior Personnel Staff Officer. His final appointment was with the Ministry of Defence, working in the Public Relations Branch. He retired from the RAF in 1975.

== Personal life ==
After the war Vaughan-Fowler married the artist Hilary Quinn. He had met a friend of Quinn's during the war when he flew out an English painter who had become trapped in Paris at the time of the German occupation. After the war the woman he had evacuated introduced Vaughan-Fowler and Quinn, and the two ended up marrying. The couple had eight children, four sons and four daughters. They resided near Oxford. During summers they would visit France, and had a holiday home in the Vendée, his children would go on to holiday there with their own children during the summers. Vaughan-Fowler maintained friendships with many of the former operators and resistance fighters, and visited them while in France. He also took a great interest in the 161 Squadron Association, and attended many of their veterans gatherings.

After he retired from the RAF in 1975 Vaughan-Fowler took up charitable work, fund-raising for medical research and hospitals. Vaughan-Fowler died in Oxford on 24 April 1994. Hilary died on 24 December 2012. They are both remembered fondly by their eight children, 26 grandchildren and 22 (and growing) great-grandchildren.

== Awards ==
- United Kingdom: Distinguished Flying Cross 16 April 1943 (Note: Flying Officer, 161 Squadron, Royal Air Force. Citation reads: In the course of a number of hazardous operational missions, Flying Officer Vaughan-Fowler has displayed unsurpassed skill, great courage and outstanding devotion to duty.)
- United Kingdom: Distinguished Flying Cross 10 September 1943 (Note: Acting First Lieutenant, 161 Squadron, Royal Air Force. Citation reads: This officer has completed numerous operational sorties. Since the award of the Distinguished Flying Cross he has continued to display outstanding keenness and enthusiasm for operational work. Second DFC awarded as a bar for on the ribbon of the first DFC.) (Note: The reader will note the wording in Vaughan-Fowler's two DFCs is rather vague. This was due to the highly secret nature of the work 161 Squadron was conducting, which did not become known to the general public until the mid 1970s.)
- United Kingdom: Distinguished Service Order 31 July 1945 (Note: Acting Squadron Leader, No. 213 Squadron, Royal Air Force. Citation reads: This officer is a skillful and courageous pilot. He has completed a very large number of sorties against a variety of targets and his determination and great keenness have materially assisted his squadron in maintaining their high standard of morale. Despite extremely adverse weather and damage to his aircraft, Squadron Leader Vaughan-Fowler has made many attacks against mechanical transport vehicles, locomotives and shipping, with a high degree of success. Much damage was inflicted on the enemy. This officer is a fine leader whose example has been well reflected in the operational efficiency of the squadron he commands)
- France: Chevalier de l' Ordre National de la Légion d'honneur 15 July 1941
- France: Croix de Guerre with Palm
- United Kingdom: Air Force Cross
- United Kingdom: Commander of the Royal Victorian Order
