= Jim McCairns =

RAF officer (1919–1948)

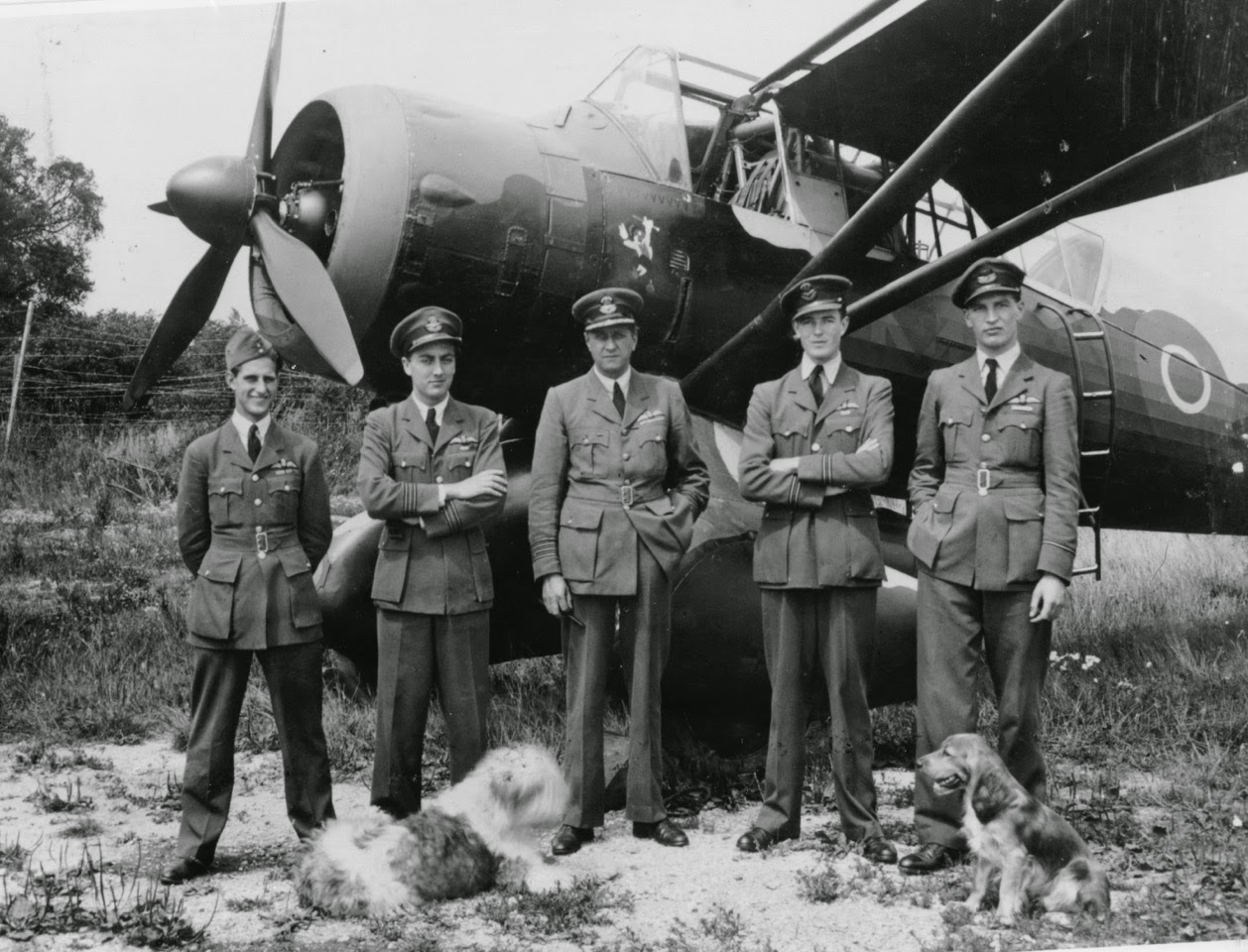
- McCairns, Hugh Verity, Charles Pickard, Peter Vaughan-Fowler and Bunny Rymills with Verity's Lysander in 1943.
- Born: 21 September 1919; Niagara Falls, New York, United States
- Died: 13 June 1948 (aged 28) near RAF Finningley, England
- Burial place: East Retford, Nottinghamshire
- Relatives: Moira McCairns
- Military career
- Allegiance: United Kingdom
- Branch: Royal Air Force
- Service years: 1939–1948
- Rank: Flight Lieutenant
- Nickname: "Mac"
- Service number: 754718 and 125754.
- Units: No. 616 Squadron RAF; No. 161 Squadron RAF; No. 3 Squadron RAF; No. 56 Squadron RAF
- Conflicts: Second World War
- Awards: Distinguished Flying Cross & Two Bars; Military Medal; Croix de guerre (France)

James Atterby McCairns, DFC & Two Bars, MM (21 September 1919 – 13 June 1948) was an English pilot with the Royal Air Force. He flew the Supermarine Spitfire fighter before becoming a prisoner of war, escaping and returning to England. He returned to active service as a "special duties" pilot working with Special Operations Executive, carrying agents to and from occupied France, before returning to combat in 1945 as a successful fighter pilot. He was decorated for gallantry five times and was killed in an air crash in 1948.

== Early life ==
McCairns was born on 21 September 1919 in Niagara Falls, New York, United States, the son of Kate Elizabeth and Thomas McCairns an English engineer who was working in the United States. His mother brought him to England for the first time aboard the ocean liner Regina sailing from Montreal and arriving in Liverpool on 18 June 1922. They visited family at Brigg, Lincolnshire before returning to Quebec on 30 September 1922 aboard the ocean liner Canopic. The family returned to England on 30 September 1930 from Boston, Massachusetts aboard the liner Duchess of York, the family settled at 20 Chapelgate, Retford, and he completed his education at King Edward VI Grammar School, Retford.

== Royal Air Force ==
He had an early fascination for flight and joined the Royal Air Force Volunteer Reserve in March 1939 as a trainee pilot, service number 754718. He completed his basic training and progressed through flight training to earn his pilot's wings aircrew brevet. On 14 October 1940 sergeant pilot McCairns joined No. 616 Squadron RAF flying Supermarine Spitfire fighters and was operational a short time later. Flying with the squadron from RAF Tangmere under the command of Douglas Bader on 30 June 1941 McCairns had a close call during an offensive sweep over occupied France when his aircraft was hit and explosive shells entered his cockpit. He retained control of his Spitfire and nursed it home to land safely.

=== Prisoner of war ===
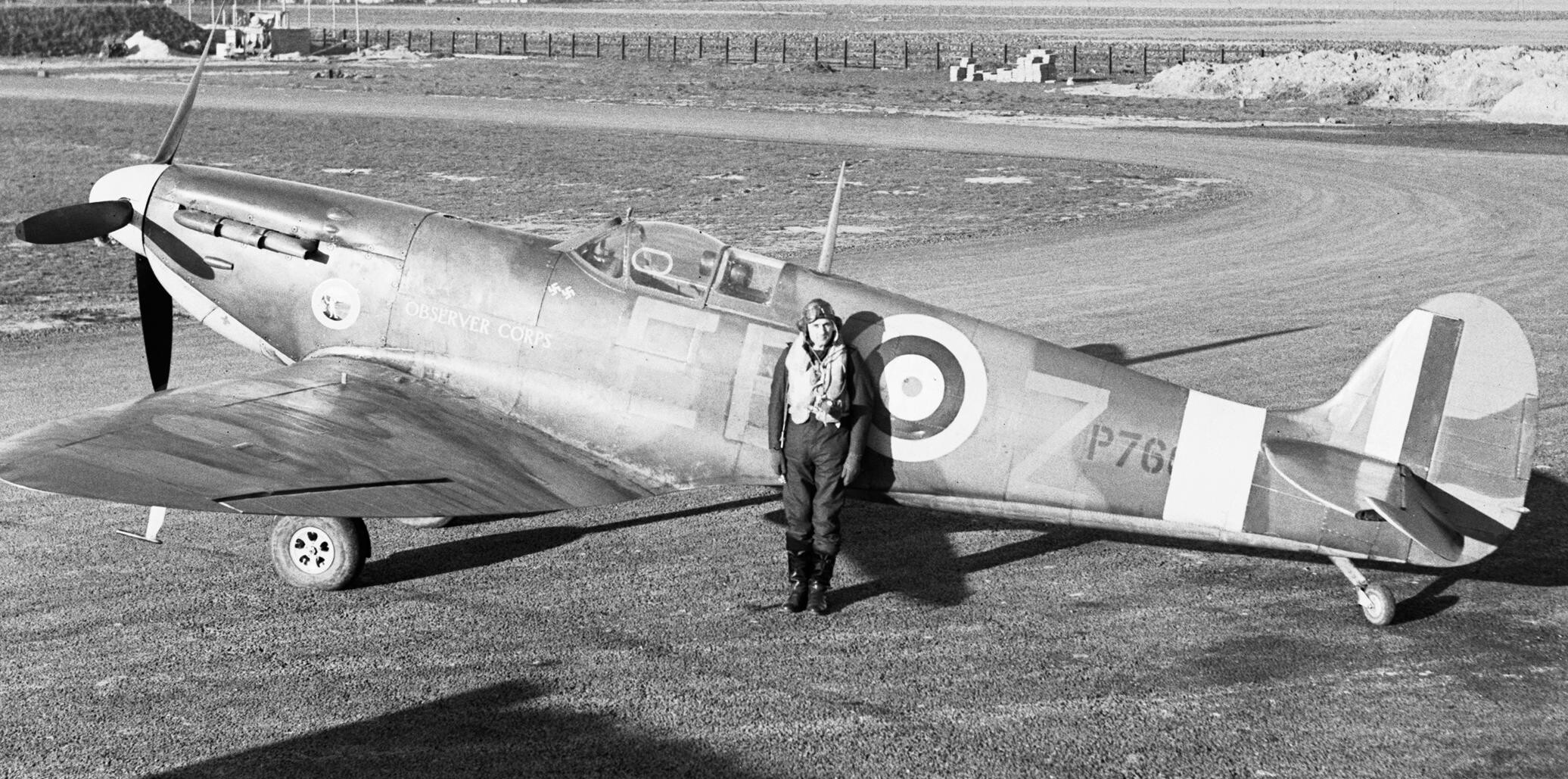
Spitfire Mk IIA, P7666, similar to the Spitfire flown by McCairns.

On 6 July 1941 after applying for a commission in the morning he was flying over the French coast with Douglas Bader when the squadron was involved in a fast moving combat with Messerschmitt Bf 109 fighters from which McCairns did not return. Initially posted as missing in action his aircraft Supermarine Spitfire Mark IIa (serial number "P8500") was positively identified by its squadron code letters painted on the fuselage when sighted by another member of the squadron on 8 July 1941, crash landed near the beach at Gravelines-Dunkirk. His cockpit canopy jammed in the crash and he was fortunate that the Spitfire did not catch fire, he had to be released by German soldiers. The records of No. 616 Squadron later recorded that he was "a very capable and keen pilot" and also that his status was "prisoner of war, slightly wounded".

Held at Stalag IX-C Bad Sulza McCairns was interested in escape activities. After one failed attempt, McCairns teamed up with a Belgian prisoner for a second escape on 22 January 1942. They made a good distance away from Bad Sulza, covering about 250 miles by rail on the first day. He travelled across Germany alone after they were separated and crossed the frontier with Belgium on foot and exhausted during the terrible blizzard of 1942. Unable to communicate easily he was fortunate to make contact with the Belgian resistance network who sent him to Brussels where he was put in touch with a Belgian agent who had been parachuted back into occupied Belgium from an RAF bomber some months before. London was made aware of his escape by the agent and guides and passage arranged to Gibraltar which he successfully reached via France and Spain.

=== Back in England and an introduction to covert operations ===
At Gibraltar he was debriefed by Lieutenant James Langley of MI9, the British Intelligence escape organisation. Langley discussed with McCairns the use of the Westland Lysander to insert and extract agents and escaped prisoners of war from the occupied countries. McCairns was taken with the idea of flying for the Royal Air Force Special Duty Service. Back in England he was promoted to flight sergeant and on 14 August 1942 was awarded the Military Medal for his bravery and achievement in his successful escape. before commencing a lecture tour for airmen who might at some stage have similar experiences.

Originally refused permission to fly the aircraft for these operations due to his junior rank, lack of the required 500 hours night-flying experience, inability to speak fluent French and a ruling forbidding escaped prisoners of war from operations in the theatre in which they were captured, he and Langley fought their case and won. He applied for and gained a commission as pilot officer on 1 May 1942, service number 125754. McCairns received intensive training and proved his ability to fly the Westland Lysander at night finally gaining approval from Wing Commander Edward Fielden in command of No. 161 Squadron RAF at RAF Tempsford which provided aerial support of all types for Special Operations Executive. The Lysander pilots would fly low and slowly across the English Channel and cross the French coastline, then head to their allocated area, where the French resistance would signal a pre-arranged code before lighting up a makeshift runway across a field, hoped to be flat enough to land a Lysander. The pilot would land his aircraft for the agents to climb down while any returning passengers climbed aboard and he would then hope to take off again before the Germans arrived. Problems were sometimes encountered with aircraft getting stuck in waterlogged fields, bushes and small trees causing damage and animals straying into the way.

Wing Commander Charles Pickard assumed command of the squadron in October 1942, and McCairns flew his first "special duties" mission as navigator to Pickard on the night 22 November 1942 when a pair of Lysanders landed in France to insert 2 agents and bring 3 back to England safely. He was promoted flying officer on 1 November 1942.

=== Special Duties pilot for SOE ===
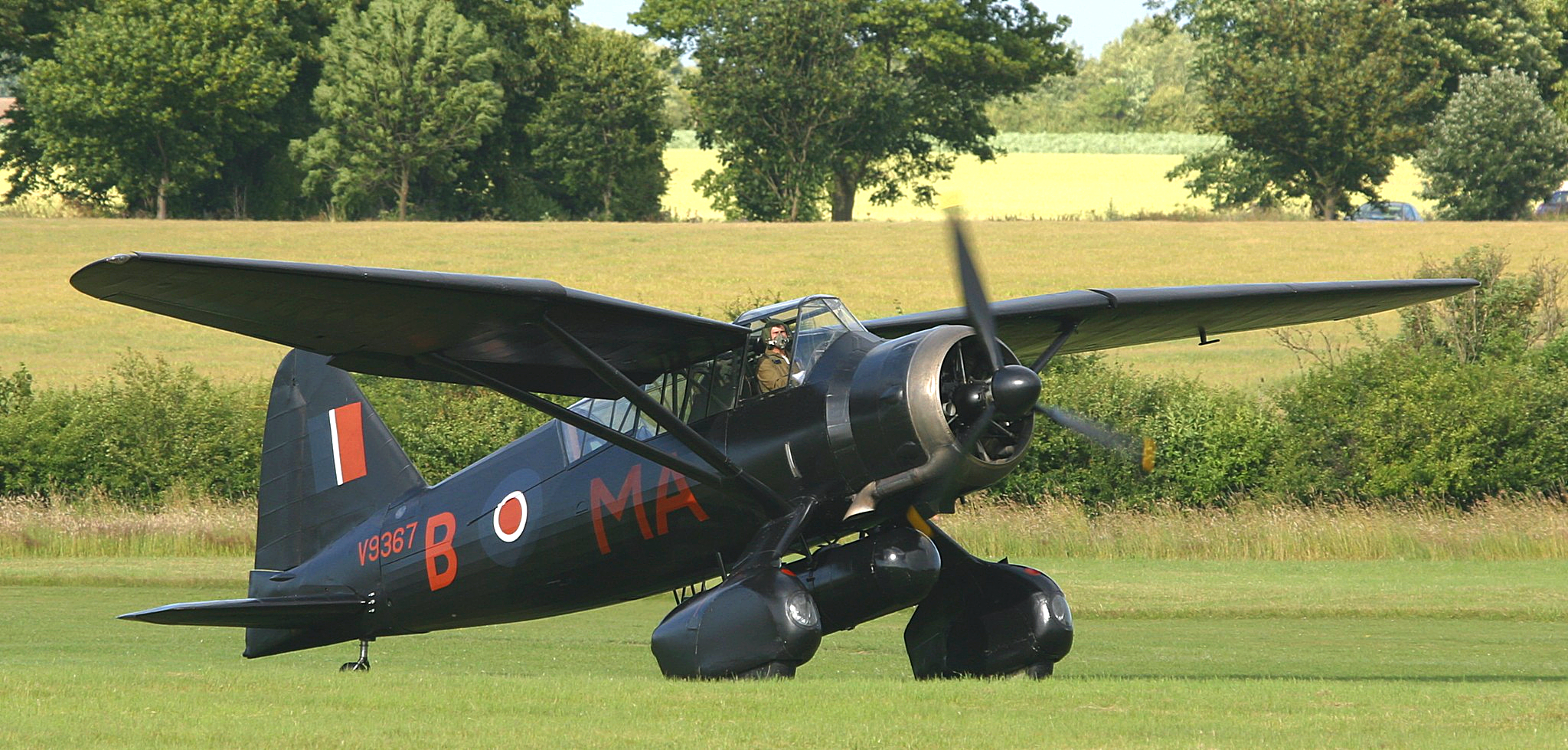
Westland Lysander Mk III (SD), the type used for special missions into occupied France during World War II.

On the night of 25–26 November 1942 he flew his first solo mission delivering two agents into France and returned with two passengers, one of them Colonel de Linares, military assistant to General Henri Giraud. Over the next thirteen months he flew 33 more covert missions for SOE of which 25 were successful, a greater success rate than any other pilot. Nineteen of his missions were highly risky "double Lysander" missions which involved both aircraft landing in the selected field and taking off again before being caught. On 13 April 1943 the London Gazette announced the award of a Distinguished Flying Cross to McCairns. The secret nature of his operations meant the wording in his citation was curtailed:

Flying Officer James Atterby McCAIRNS, M.M. (125754), Royal Air Force Volunteer Reserve, No. 161 Squadron. This officer has completed many sorties, most of them of a hazardous nature. He is a courageous and determined pilot who has set an example worthy of the highest praise.

The majority of McCairns missions were successful. Perhaps his most dangerous mission was on the night of 14/15 April 1943 when an operator choose a field near Amboise that did not have a clear flare path. As he came in for his landing approach he struck a twelve-foot-tall poplar tree. McCairns asked the operator what the damage was and he was told none, only the radio aerial had been torn away. Without climbing down to inspect the damage for himself, McCairns took aboard his passengers and took off. He soon realised he had a more serious problem. The stick was shaking in his hand and his oil temperature was rising. Eventually the engine froze up. He began gliding down and decided they would all have to bail out. However, checking in with his passengers he was informed he was carrying four. Only having two parachutes in the back, he realized he would have to try a forced landing on the unknown ground below. With 3,000 feet to go he discovered the reason for the engine failure. The carburettor air heater had been knocked out of position and the carburettor had iced up. Once he corrected this he was able to restart the engine, and they resumed their rough flight back to RAF Tangmere. After landing it was discovered the spinner was stove in, and the tailplane had been nearly torn loose, held in place by the single remaining screw of a single bracket. On 10 August 1943 the London Gazette announced his award of a Bar to the Distinguished Flying Cross. The nature of his work again meant the citation was brief :

Flying Officer James Atterby MCCAIRNS, D.F.C., M.M. (125754), Royal Air Force Volunteer Reserve, No. 161 Squadron. This officer has completed numerous sorties displaying a high degree of skill and determination throughout.

In September 1943 he, the squadron commander Squadron Leader Hugh Verity and McCairns' usual partner on "double Lysander" missions Peter Vaughan-Fowler, carried out the squadron's first treble Lysander aircraft operation which was successful. On returning safely to RAF Tangmere McCairns recounted that he had flown at low level along the Loire waiting for his turn to land and had heard a strange "phitt" sound in the cockpit. The next morning his ground crew showed him two round holes in the side windows of his cockpit. A bullet had entered the cockpit and must have missed his nose by just three inches. His last mission with No. 161 Squadron was on 16–17 December 1943. While with 161 McCairns had flown out many British, French and Belgian SOE agents and similar covert operations personnel, and returned with many others, along with a number of US and the Commonwealth airmen who had either been shot down and were evading capture or had been interned and escaped from their prison camp.

McCairns was awarded a second Bar to the Distinguished Flying Cross on 14 January 1944.

=== Later RAF career ===
Following his highly successful tour with No. 161 Squadron he was posted to a staff position involved in the identification of proposed landing sites for Westland Lysander and much larger Lockheed Hudson aircraft involved in clandestine operations. McCairns was promoted flight lieutenant on 1 May 1944. He returned to operational flying, converting back to fighters to fly the Hawker Tempest in No. 3 Squadron RAF. On 28 February 1945 he engaged the Luftwaffe south of Hildesheim, Germany. He damaged a Messerschmitt Bf 109, and moments later shared in the destruction of a Siebel Si 204. He was made flight commander and was transferred to No. 56 Squadron RAF.

After the war McCairns transferred to the re-constituted Royal Auxiliary Air Force, effective 3 May 1947 as a flight lieutenant, service number 91315. He served again with No. 616 Squadron.

== Death ==
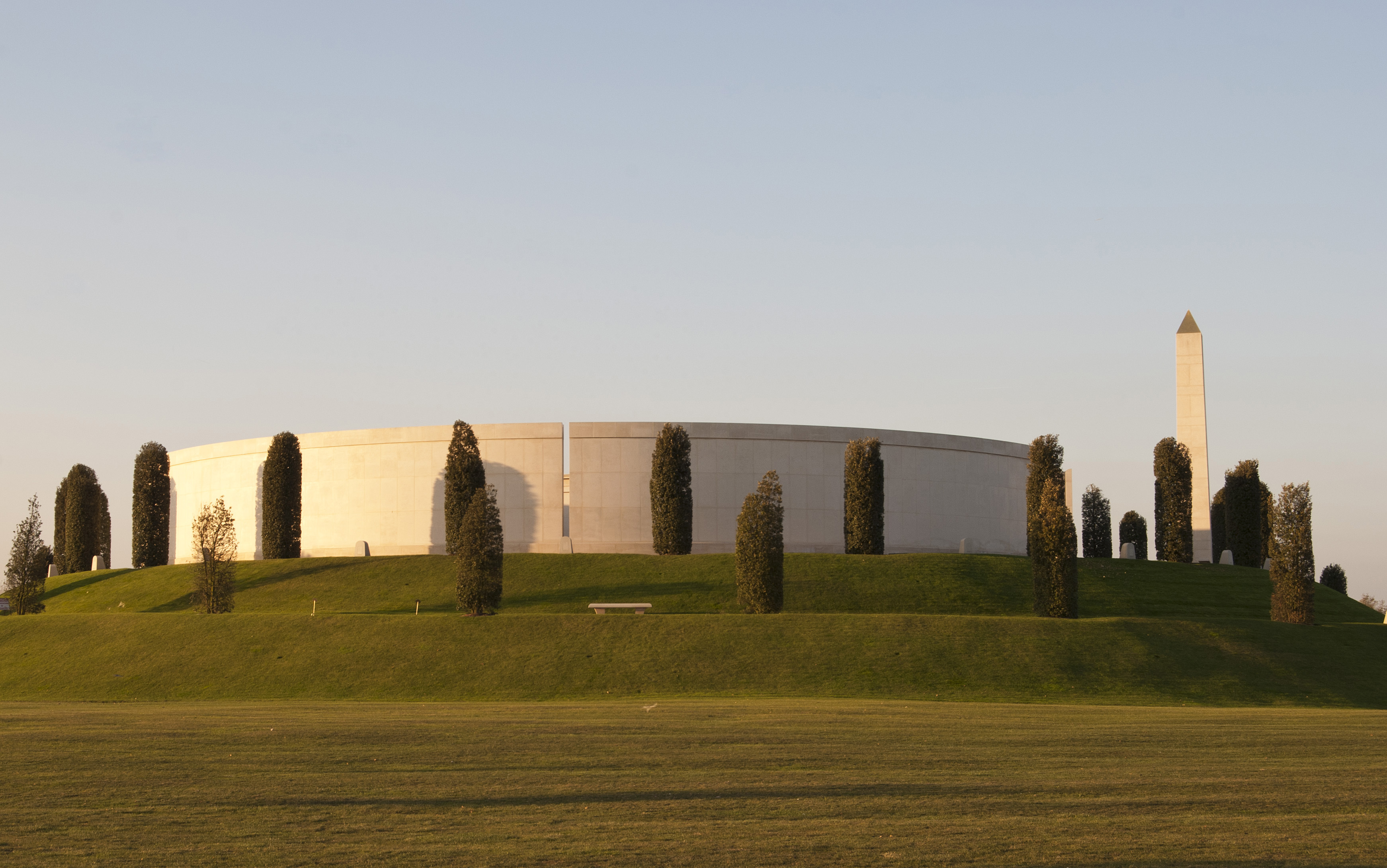
Armed Forces Memorial at the National Memorial Arboretum, Alrewas, Staffordshire

McCairns was flying De Havilland Mosquito "NT423" at low altitude on 13 June 1948 when one of the engines failed. The aircraft dropped a wing and nose-dived into the ground, bursting into flames. The crash occurred near RAF Finningley in Yorkshire. Both McCairns and his passenger were killed.

The Times Monday on 14 June 1948 reported:

A Mosquito aircraft of 616 South Yorkshire Squadron Royal Auxiliary Air Force, crashed and burst into flames a mile east of Finningley RAF Station to-day when on a local flight. The pilot Flying Officer J A McCairns DFC MM who lived near Bawtry, and a serving airman whose next-of-kin are not yet notified, were killed. The ground crews heard one of the engines making an unusual noise and saw the aircraft bank round the airport and nose-dive to the ground.

His passenger was AC2 (2321296) Edward Shaw of Dipton, County Durham. Shaw was a fitter who had accompanied McCairns on an engine test check flight. He was 19 years old. As 616 Squadron was an Auxiliary unit, McCairns also had a civilian job. He worked as an area manager for Clark's of Retford, a launderette company. The day before he had flown a round trip to Tangmere in a three-aircraft formation. The Operations Record Book for 616 Squadron, compiled by Flt Lt Aytoun, DFC, recorded the details of the crash. It stated the aircraft had taken off at 16.15 and crashed 10-minutes later when an in-flight emergency was declared due to an engine failure. The ORB gives the crash location as half-a-mile from the north boundary of the airfield.

The Nottingham Journal on Friday June 18, 1948 reported: Triple D.F.C.'s Fatal Crash. Flying-Officer James McCairns (28), triple D.F.C., MM. and Croix de Guerre holder, of Mattersey Thorpe, near Doncaster, was described a very experienced pilot with 1,234 hours' flying time, at yesterday's Doncaster inquest on McCairns and A.C Edward Shaw (19), of Front Street, Hill Top, Dipton. Both men were killed when their Mosquito plane crashed and caught fire near Finningley RAF Station on Sunday. A witness said that the coolant of the port engine cooling system had escaped, causing the engine to overheat and fail. The Coroner (Mr. W. H. Carlile) said he was satisfied all necessary checks had been made on the aircraft. He recorded verdicts of "Accidental death".

In 2013, Chris McCairns, the son of Jim McCairns born shortly before his death, presented McCairn's medals to the Tangmere Aviation Museum.

McCairns is commemorated on the National Arboretum Armed Forces Memorial, and with a Blue Plaque in Retford.

== Bibliography ==
- Burns, Michael (1990). Bader, the man and his men. London: Arms and Armour. ISBN 1854092464.
- Foot, M. R. D. (2006). SOE in France. Routledge. ISBN 0415408008.
- Foreman, John (1996). The Fighter Command War Diaries. Walton-on-Thames: Air Research. ISBN 1-871187-34-6.
- Foreman, John (2005). RAF Fighter Command Victory Claims, Part Three. Walton-on-Thames: Red Kite. ISBN 0-9546201-5-1.
- Franks, Norman (1997). Royal Air Force Fighter Command Losses. Vol. 1. Earl Shilton: Midland Counties. ISBN 1-857800559.
- Hunt, Leslie (1992). Twenty-one Squadrons: the history of the Royal Auxiliary Air Force. London: Crecy. ISBN 0947554262.
- Shores, Christopher (1999). Aces High. Vol. 2. London: Grub Street. ISBN 1-898697-00-0.
- McCairns, James Lysander Pilot (2016).
- Verity, Hugh (2013). We Landed by Moonlight. Crecy Publishing. ISBN 9780947554750.
