= Percy Pickard =

Royal Air Force officer

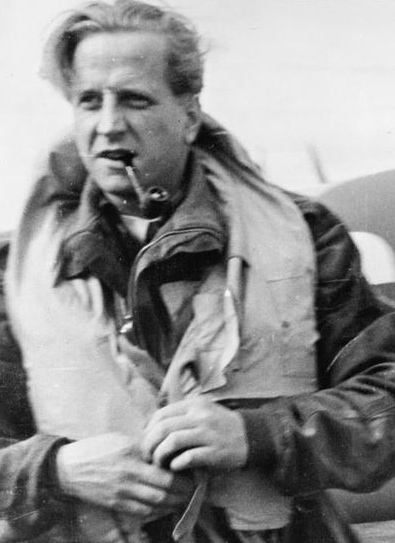
- Born: 19 May 1915; Handsworth, Sheffield, West Riding of Yorkshire, England
- Died: 18 February 1944 (aged 28); Amiens, France
- Military career
- Allegiance: United Kingdom
- Branch: Royal Air Force
- Service years: 1937–1944
- Rank: Group captain
- Nickname: "Pick"
- Commands: No. 140 Wing RAF; No. 51 Squadron; No. 161 Squadron
- Conflicts: Second World War: European air campaign; Norwegian campaign; French and Low Countries campaign; Battle of France; Dunkirk evacuation; French bombing campaign; Operation Biting; Operation Jericho †
- Awards: Distinguished Service Order & Two Bars; Distinguished Flying Cross; Mentioned in Despatches; Czechoslovak War Cross 1939

Group Captain Percy Charles "Pick" Pickard, DSO & Two Bars, DFC (16 May 1915 – 18 February 1944) was an officer in the Royal Air Force during the Second World War. He served as a pilot and commander, and was the first officer of the RAF to be awarded the DSO three times during the war. He flew over a hundred sorties and distinguished himself in a variety of operations requiring coolness under fire.

In 1941 he was asked to participate in the making of the Crown film Target for To-night. Attention from the film made him a public figure in the UK. Later that year he led the squadron of Whitley bombers that carried paratroopers to their drop for the Bruneval raid.

Through most of 1943 he commanded 161 Squadron, the secretive unit that flew SOE agents in and out of occupied France. He was a very active commanding officer, and flew many of the missions himself. In late 1943 Pickard was made the commander of a new unit, 140 Wing, a ground attack formation whose three squadrons had converted to the Mosquito. On 18 February 1944 Pickard led a group of Mosquitos on the Amiens prison raid to destroy the walls of a Gestapo prison and free the prisoners inside. He was killed in this operation. Pickard was one of the RAF's most highly regarded bomber pilots of the war, ranking among the likes of Guy Gibson and Leonard Cheshire.

== Early life ==
Pickard was born in Handsworth, Sheffield, in the West Riding of Yorkshire, England. He was the youngest of five children, with an older brother and three older sisters. His father was Percy Charles Pickard, a Yorkshireman who moved to London and started a catering company. Having the same name as his father and being the youngest of five in the family, he was affectionately referred to as 'Boy', and the family nickname persisted, even as he grew to be 6' 4". His older brother, Walter, joined the RAF and became an officer. His oldest sister, Helena Pickard, became an actress; she married the actor Cedric Hardwicke.

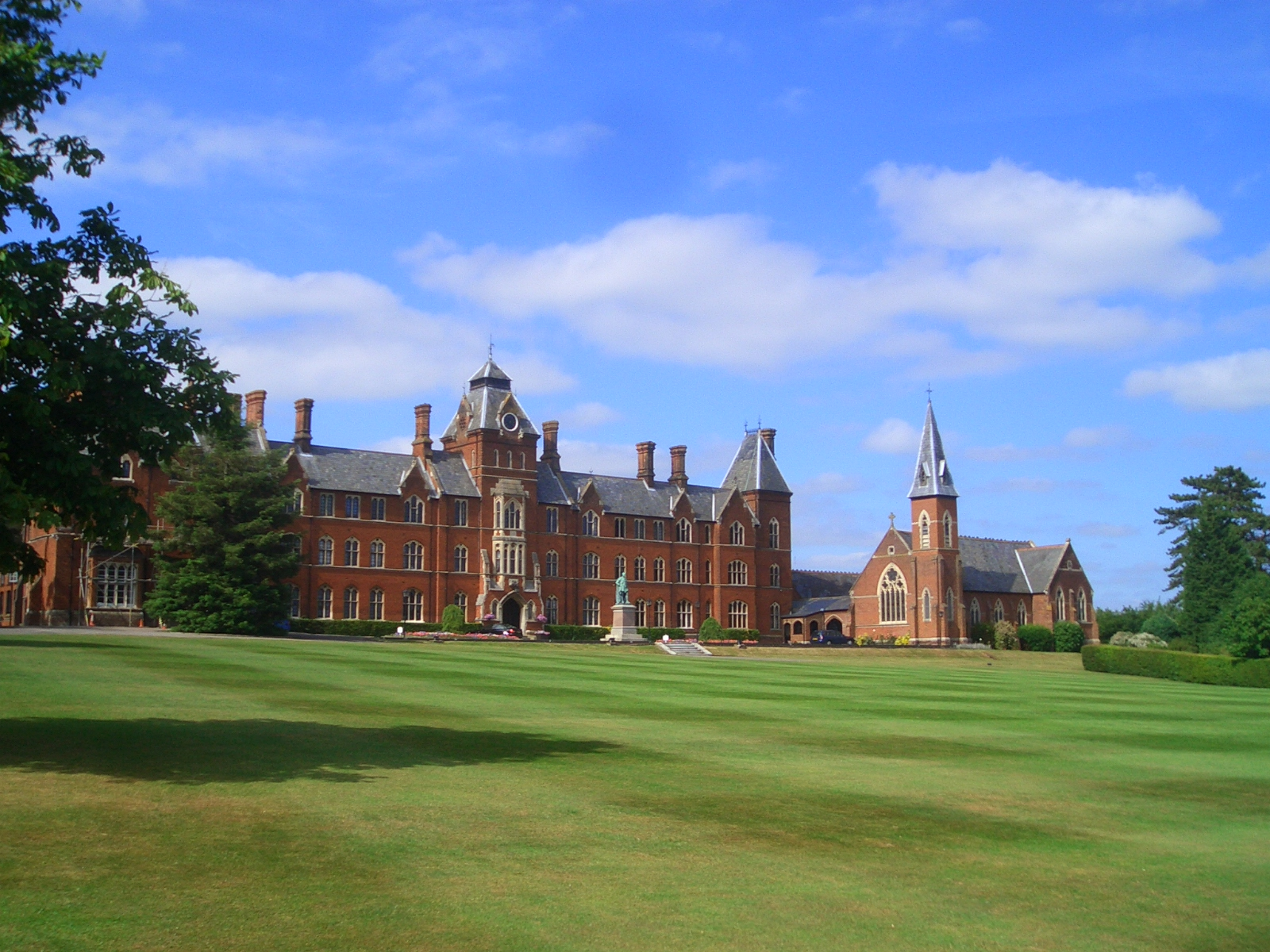
Framlingham College

Pickard was sent to Framlingham College. Though bright and engaging, Pickard struggled with reading and writing. There is some evidence to suggest he struggled with dyslexia. Nevertheless, he was an enthusiastic classmate, and was active in school sports. He developed into an excellent shot, and captained his house rifle team. His favourite activity was riding. A farm in British East Africa was owned by the family of another student. To encourage their son in coming to Africa they offered to board one of his classmates when he came down to the farm; Pickard took the offer. After a couple of years the classmate returned to England, but Pickard stayed on. The vast grasslands provided ample opportunity for riding, and Pickard excelled as a Polo player, earning a 3 handicap. While there Pickard enlisted in the King's African Rifles as a reservist.

With war looming in Europe, Pickard and three of his friends chose to return to England. Lacking the funds for a full passage, they drove their car north through Italian Somaliland, British Somaliland, Anglo-Egyptian Sudan and finally to Egypt. Along the way Pickard became ill with malaria and the group of travellers had to stop for some time. Eventually they made it to Alexandria, from where they obtained transport back to England.

Upon returning to England Pickard volunteered to serve as an officer with the Army, but was declined on account of his poor school results. He then applied to the Royal Air Force, who were in the midst of a massive expansion, and was accepted. He was granted an RAF short service commission in January 1937, completing his pilot training programme with an "above average" rating. He was posted to 214 Squadron, equipped with the Handley Page H.P.54 Harrow bomber. He received a commission as acting pilot officer 25 January 1937. The post of pilot officer was confirmed and made permanent 16 November 1937. During this period he began seeing Dorothy Hodgkin. Her family did not approve but they wed anyway. He gave his bride the present of an Old English Sheepdog to keep her company while he was away; they named the large dog 'Ming'.

Pickard's skill as a pilot was soon noticed, and in 1938 he was appointed ADC to Air Vice Marshall John Baldwin, the air officer, commanding the training programme at RAF Cranwell.

== First tour with 99 Squadron ==
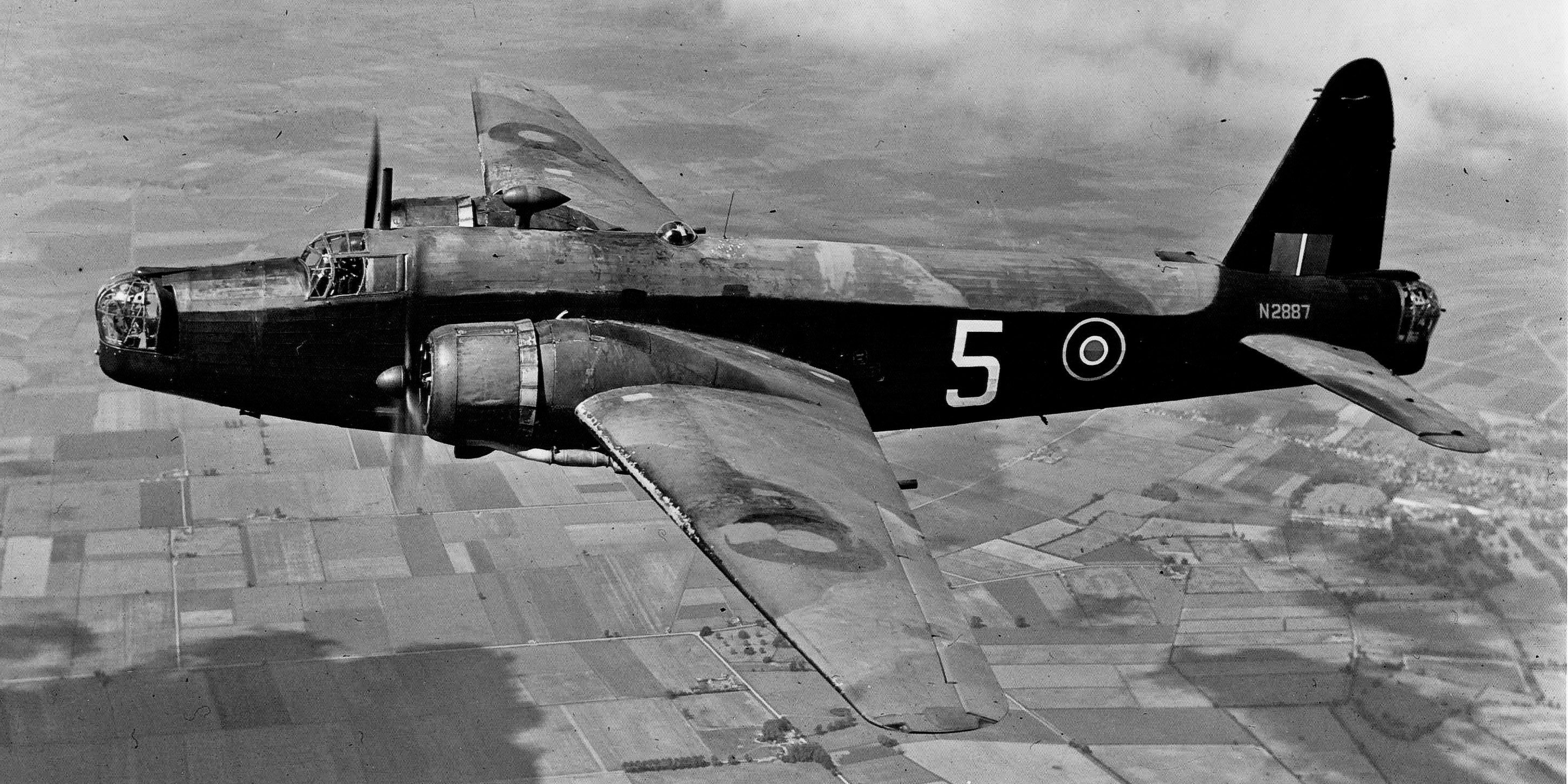
The Vickers Wellington

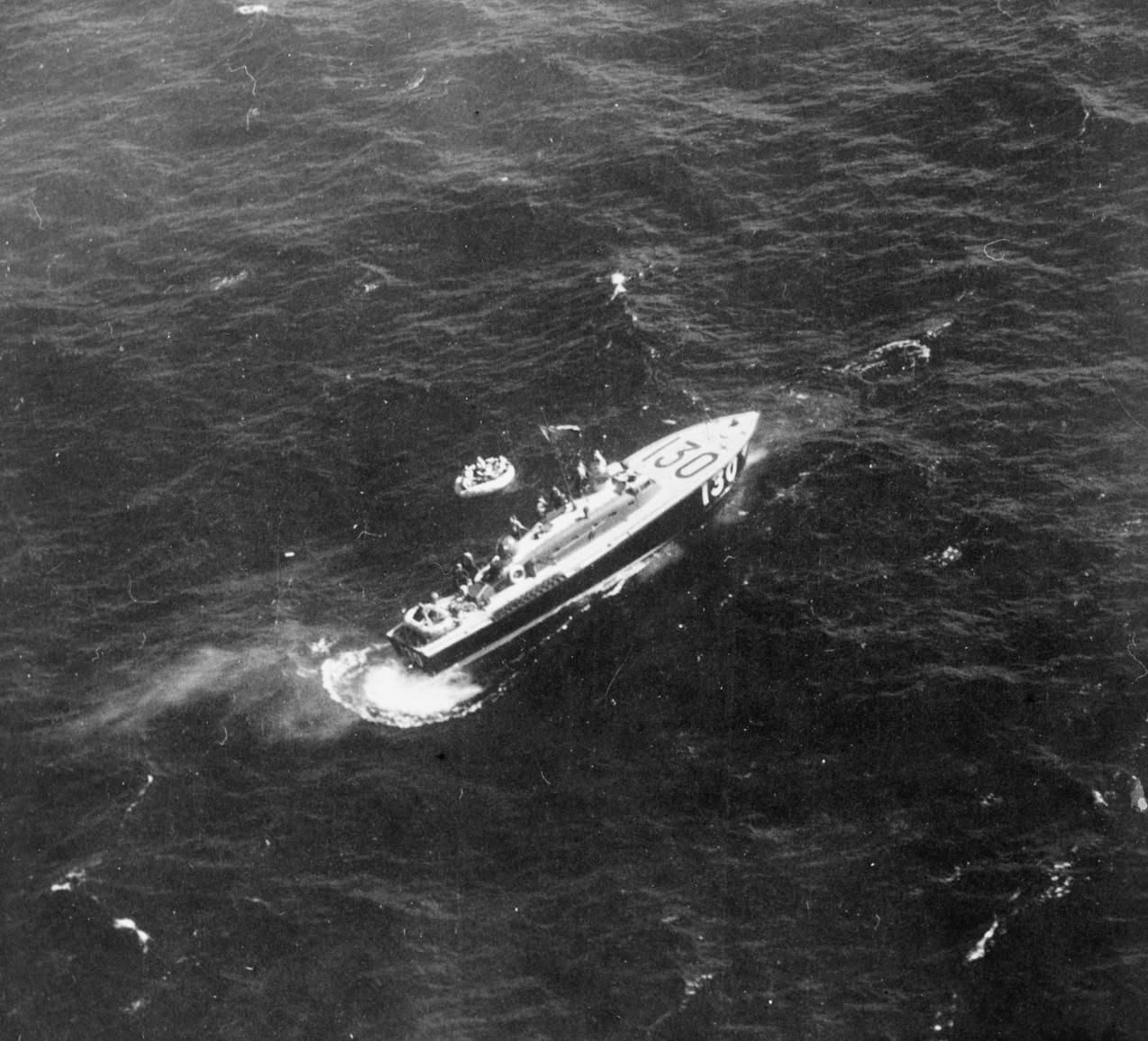
British high-speed launch rescues a downed aircrew

On 30 October 1939 Pickard was posted to 7 Squadron flying Hampden bombers at RAF Upper Heyford. He was then returned to 214 Squadron until this squadron was disbanded to form an operational training unit. Pickard briefly returned to 7 Squadron before being posted to 99 Squadron at Newmarket Heath, where he flew the Vickers Wellington, one of the best bomber aircraft available at the time. He completed his first tour with 99 Squadron.

In the early stages of the war prior to the German invasion of France Bomber command was reticent about escalating the war with attacks on German cities. Instead during this Phoney War period they confined their activities to coastal patrols and dropping leaflets over Germany. Serving as a flight lieutenant, Pickard undertook these leaflet-dropping sorties. He flew alongside Jack Grisman of Great Escape fame. Following the German bombing of Rotterdam the restrictions on Bomber Command were lifted. Pickard participated in fighting over Norway, Germany and France during the Dunkirk evacuation. He gained a reputation for following the Bomber Command dictum to "press on" to the target, regardless of the difficulties you might be faced with. It was during this period that Pickard met fellow Yorkshireman navigator Alan Broadley, who was to become his regular navigator and good friend to the end. Aircraft service crews grew accustomed to Pickard and Broadley returning in an aircraft that had been peppered with flak and night fighter damage.

On one such mission while on a raid to the Ruhr, Pickard's Wellington was hit by flak over the target and he lost his starboard engine. With the loss of power he began to slowly lose altitude. Pickard nursed the aircraft past the coast but was unable to get across the water and had to ditch in the North Sea. The crew were able to escape the sinking aircraft and all entered a rubber dinghy. After a number of hours they were located by an RAF air-sea rescue launch. Unfortunately, Pickard had set down in a naval mine field. It took many more hours for them to drift out of the mine field so they could be picked up. In all they spent 14 hours in the bitter cold of the North Sea.

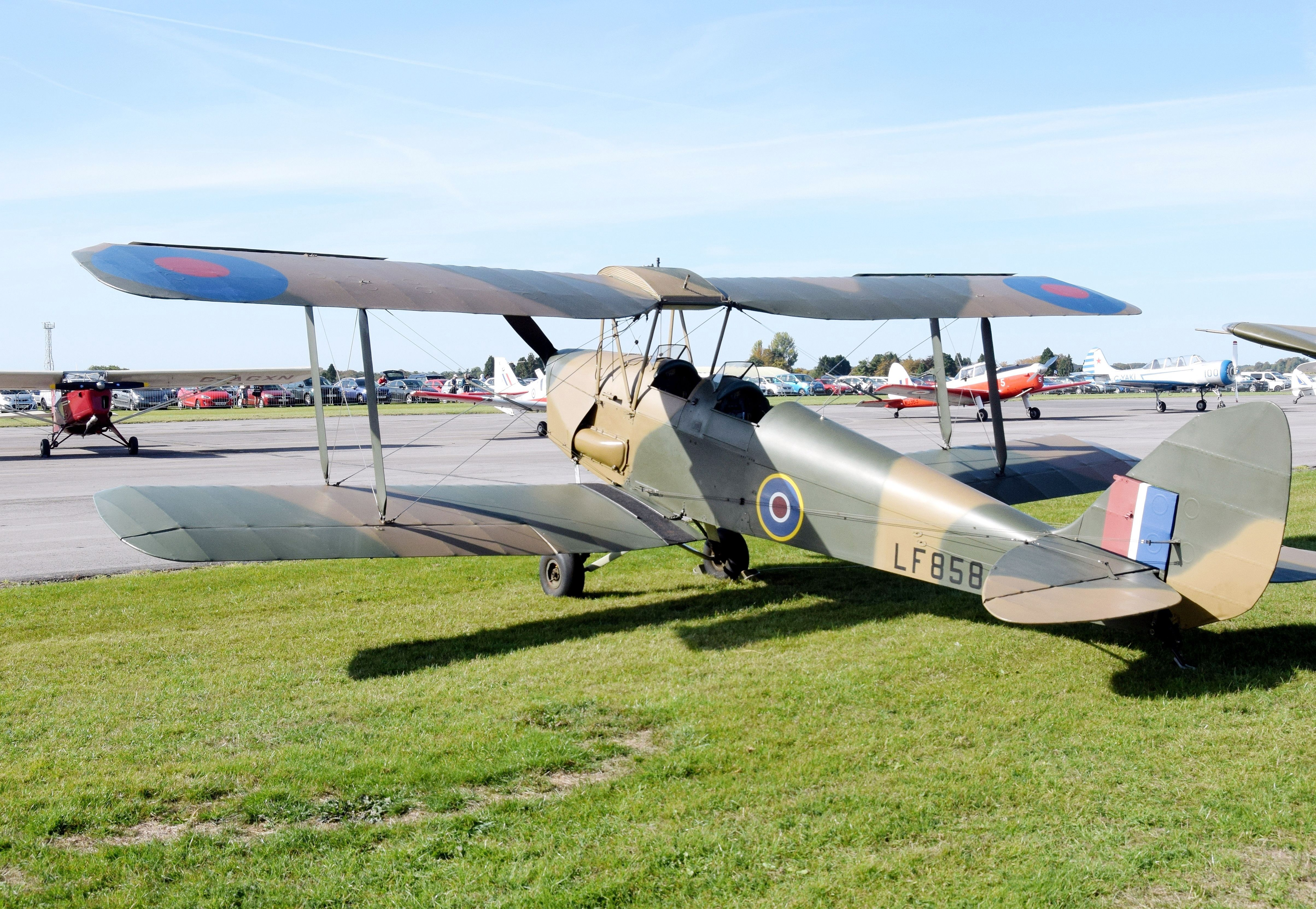
The de Havilland Tiger Moth

While stationed at RAF Newmarket, Pickard lived on base with his wife Dorothy and their dog 'Ming'. Horse racing having been suspended due to the war, Pickard was able to acquire two former race horses inexpensively, which allowed him to ride again. Pickard rode each morning, often with his wife, but always with Ming running alongside. Another activity he enjoyed was just flying. He had enough seniority to be allowed use of the station de Havilland Tiger Moth. The two-seat biplane trainer has benign handling characteristics in basic flying, but when pushed hard in aerobatics the demand on the skill of the pilot is quite high. It is an airplane that is "easy to fly, but difficult to fly well". After a hard period of missions a favourite activity of Pickard's was to take up the Tiger Moth and lose himself in flying.

Pickard was awarded the Distinguished Flying Cross in July 1940 for services rendered over Norway. By the end of November 1940, after a year with 99 Squadron, Pickard and Broadley had completed 31 sorties and were rotated to non-operational duties.

== Pilot instruction at 311 (Czech) Squadron ==
With the completion of his first tour Pickard was promoted to squadron leader and transferred to a training position, working to train up pilots in the No. 311 (Czechoslovak) Squadron operating out of RAF East Wretham. 311 Squadron was not-fully operational. Pickard was one of a number of RAF veterans there to improve morale, performance and the unit's operational standards. Preferring an informal approach, he arrived wearing his uniform and a pair of riding boots notched for stirrups, which is how the Czechs nicknamed him 'cowboy'. Wherever he went he was accompanied by his dog. As an officer, Pickard was mild mannered, approachable and humorous, but on missions he was a very determined pilot.

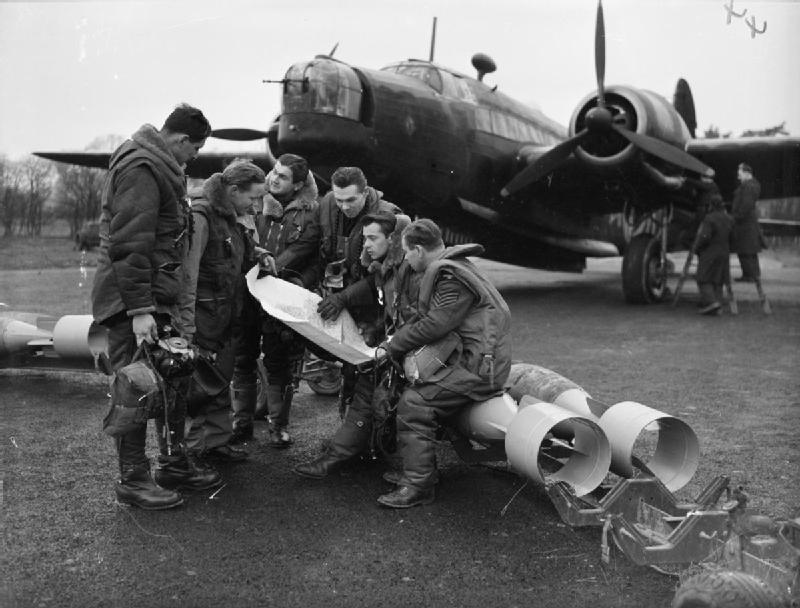
Training Czech airmen are posed examining a map of the continent

Most of the squadron's flights were coastal patrol missions, but as part of the training process from time to time the crews would join in with the combat squadrons for missions over Germany. Pickard proved a hard task master and persistent instructor. Language obstacles proved a significant barrier. Due to the high variation in competence, Pickard concentrated his efforts on those pilots with the most experience flying. An interpreter directed him to one man with 2,000 hours flying experience. After a single trip together Pickard felt the pilot strangely inept for a man with so many flying hours under his belt. After a few more episodes of ham-fisted flying Pickard lost his patience, shouting how it could possibly be that a man with 2,000 hours flying could handle an aircraft so poorly? "Oh, not pilot," the student replied sheepishly, "I observer." The man had no piloting experience at all. Undeterred, Pickard pressed on, training the man up as a pilot anyway.

In training, Pickard made it a point to accompany pilots on their first sortie over enemy territory. Though the risks of being shot down on such flights were the same, the sortie flights Pickard flew with the Czechs were off the books and did not add to his sortie totals. One such first trip flight was to Berlin. The young pilot had the misfortune of ejecting his side screen window shortly after taking off. With the cold night air filling the cockpit, he went to turn back to base when he was met with the unwavering gaze of Pickard, who pointed him in the direction of Germany. It was a long, cold trip for the both of them, but when they made it back several hours later a very cold but wiser Czech pilot had learned something of the value the RAF placed on pressing on, regardless.

It was while Pickard was training the Czech pilots that he was approached to participate in a film project to promote the service. Pickard was reluctant to appear, but left 311 Squadron in mid-March, returning in April. The film, Target for To-Night, was released that summer, in July 1941. The plot concerned a Wellington bomber, F 'Freddie', taking part in a raid over Germany. Pickard appeared as Squadron Leader Dickson, the pilot, whose aircraft delivers its bombs but is damaged by flak over the target and struggles to make it back to England. The film was produced by the Crown Film Unit and directed by Harry Watt. The film was created to boost the morale of the people of Britain and encourage young men and women to join the service. The film was a box office hit and won an Academy Award in 1942. With the release of the film Pickard became a public figure. Widely known as the pilot of the bomber “F-Freddie”, he was the living symbol of Bomber Command's night war against Germany.

During his time with 311 Squadron Pickard received his first Distinguished Service Order (DSO) in March 1941. He was also awarded the Czech Cross.

== Second tour with 9 Squadron ==
His 'rest period' completed, on 14 May 1941 Pickard was assigned to 9 Squadron based at RAF Honington. Here he was flying the Vickers Wellington again. He was soon joined by Broadley, who by now had become a commissioned officer. In the summer of 1941 over the night skies of Germany, Pickard flew another 33 sorties with Broadley, bringing his total to 64 by the end of August. This mission total did not include those he flew with the Czechs. At the time, only about 25% of RAF aircrews survived to the end of a 30 sortie tour of combat. Crews who had completed a second tour of twenty were considered to have “done their part”, and were rotated away to non-combat roles.

With the end of his second tour Pickard was assigned to 3 Group headquarters, tasked with flying senior command officers between airbases. Broadley was assigned to 138 Squadron. While on a leave from 3 Group HQ Pickard managed to talk his way into the right-hand seat of a 138 Squadron Whitley for an 8-hour flight and a low-level drop for the French resistance at Châteauroux. He then managed to get aboard one of the squadron's Wellingtons in a flight over the Netherlands to help deliver its cargo of six 250 lb bombs (for the Germans) and half a million cigarettes (for the Dutch). Through the autumn Pickard continued with shuttle flights for the upper ranks. However, this work was not appealing to him, and he endeavoured to get himself transferred.

== Commanding 51 Squadron and the Bruneval raid ==
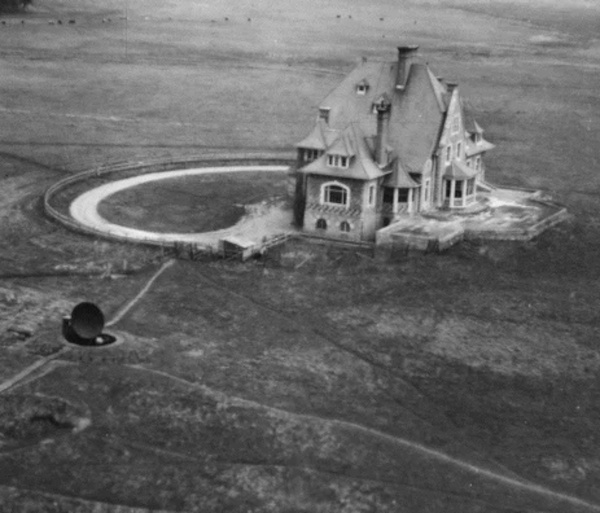
Photo recon image of the German Würzburg radar station near Bruneval

In November 1941 Pickard was made commanding officer of 51 Squadron stationed at RAF Dishforth. The squadron was flying Whitleys. The older bombers were being used for photographic reconnaissance to evaluate targets and assess bomb damage.

In January planning had begun by the Combined Operations Headquarters under Lord Mountbatten in response to a request by R. V. Jones and the TRE to capture a German radar, an example of which was located on the bluffs overlooking the French coast near Bruneval. German air defences had been improving, and they had developed a new radar, the Würzburg air defence radar, which could read both an aircraft's direction of flight and its altitude. Transmitting this information to circling night fighters made the job of locating a bomber in the dark of night much easier. Jones and his group were keen to examine one, so they might devise methods to disrupt it. A raid making use of elements of the newly formed British 1st Airborne Division was planned. Air transport for the mission was to be provided by 38 Wing, a unit just brought together, but problems with this unit due to insufficient transport aircraft and a lack of veteran crews caused the mission to be reassigned to the more experienced 51 Squadron under Pickard.

The target German radar station was situated on a 400 ft bluff overlooking the French coast. The mission was for 51 Squadron to carry a group of paratroopers to the German radar station, where they would dismantle it and bring it back, along with a couple of technical operators. The drop would be made between 500 and 600 feet. In January Pickard and his squadron began low-level flight training. Their Whitley bombers were modified, with holes cut in the fuselage to allow men to jump from the aircraft. Each Whitley could carry 10 paratroopers. Using 51 Squadron's twelve Whitleys, that meant the force would be limited to 120 men.

They needed the full moon period for visibility on making the jump and landing, correct tides to allow the landing craft to get to the beach, and minimal wind so the paratroopers could drop. The conditions of moon and tide only came together once a month. The weather in late February was very poor, and the mission had to be postponed three times due to excessive wind. Clearance to go was finally given on 27 February, and on a snowy evening the paratroopers boarded for what came to be known as the Bruneval raid. The raid was conducted under the command of Major John Frost. Pickard was confident the flying aspect of the mission would not be difficult, but dropping these men into occupied France with no sure way out seemed to him quite risky. In fact, R. V. Jones had gone home that afternoon wondering to himself how many he would ever see again. Just before the paratroopers boarded Pickard pulled Frost aside and told him "I feel like a bloody murderer." Whatever reservations Pickard may have had, he did not let it show to the men. In fact, a number of officers reported after the fact that the sight of him standing by his aircraft, calmly puffing away on his pipe, and the sight of his crews all waiting patiently in their relaxed way, was reassuring.

Pickard's flight of Whitleys were to be masked by Bomber Command missions to the continent, but these had to be scrubbed due to the poor weather. At 2200 they were cleared to go, and Pickard's Whitley led off from RAF Thruxton. The aircraft formed up, twelve aircraft in three groups of four, with 5 minutes between each group. They headed southeast for RAF Tangmere in strict radio silence. Pickard had allowed 30 minutes for unforeseen problems. Arriving over the fighter base he circled the area to burn off the extra time, and then led out to Selsey Bill where they left the coast, heading across the Channel.

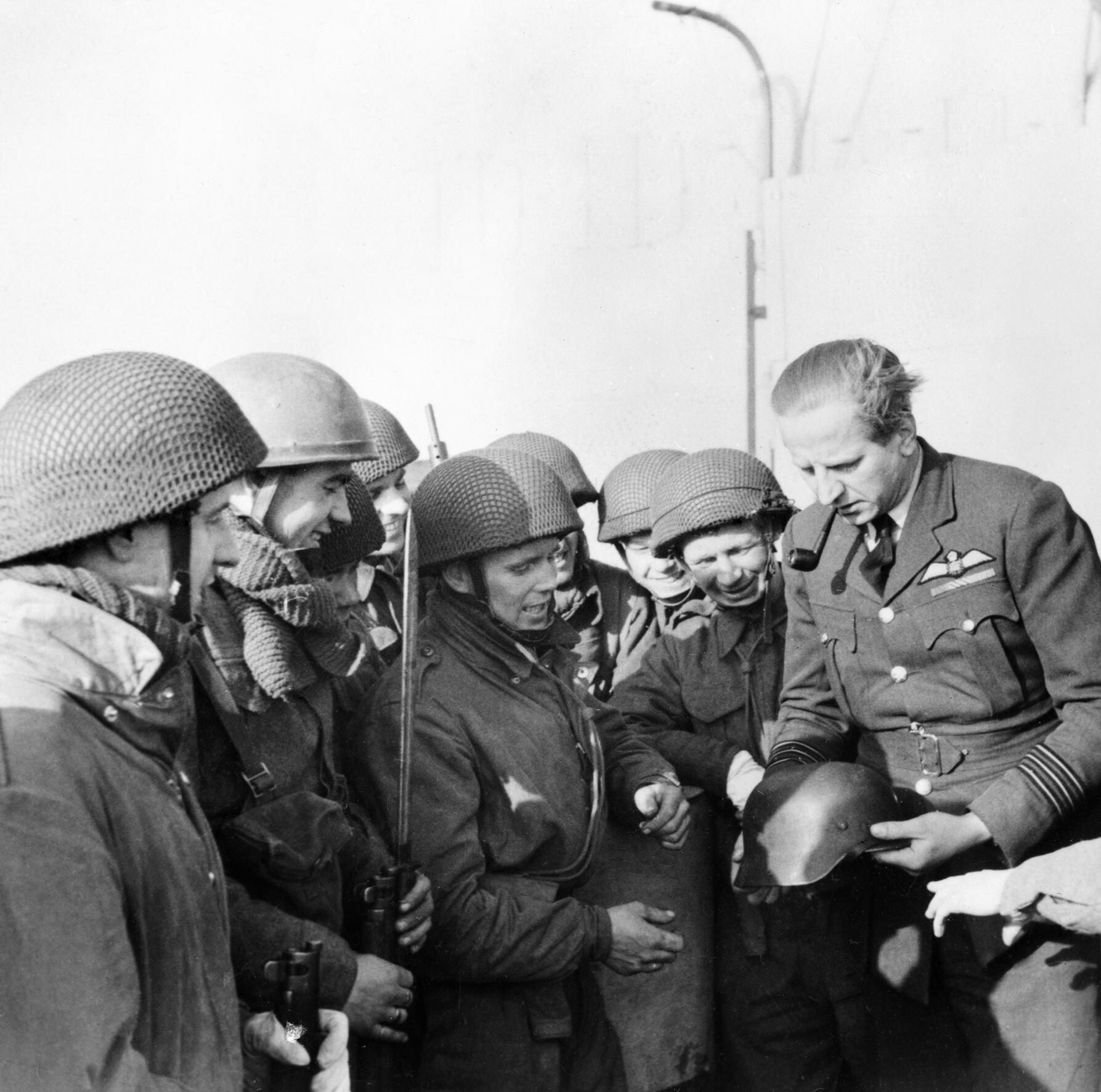
Pickard was waiting on board the command ship HMS Prins Albert for the paratroopers' return. He is posed here with a group of paratroopers and an enemy helmet taken during the raid against the German radar station at Bruneval.

Halfway across the Channel they ran into heavy cloud, and were forced down below 200 metres. They continued on their heading to Fécamp, 16 kilometres north of Bruneval, climbing to 400 metres. Picked up by the Freya radar station at Bruneval, their presence was radioed down to the Würzburg tracking station, who began tracking their movement. The Würzburg radar crew watched the group of bombers approach Fécamp till they got within 5 km, then saw them suddenly turn south and seemingly head directly for them. The crew turned off their set and rushed into their bunkers. In actuality, Pickard's bombers were flying parallel to the coast, trying to pick out landmarks to ensure their position. Flak came up from four flak ships off Yport and two aircraft, including Pickard's, were hit, but no serious damage was done.

They travelled off the shore for 5 kilometres, then turned to port, climbed to 500 metres and crossed the coast. Another turn to port and they were heading north for the drop zone. As they approached they dropped down to 100 metres and slowed to 160 kilometres per hour. The first two aircraft, Pickard's and another, got slightly off course and dropped their sticks 2 kilometres south of the drop zone. These men had been assigned to overcome the beach defences from behind and hold the beach till the team could be taken off. Though they had to figure out where they were and then quick march up the road to get to the beach, they arrived just as the assault was going in. The other ten aircraft delivered their sticks right over the drop zone.

Increasing speed and continuing on northward, the bombers again came under fire from the Flak batteries protecting the Freya station. Past these was the lighthouse and the coast. Pickard dropped down to 15 metres and headed home, following the same route that had brought them there. Upon returning to base Pickard debriefed, got a short rest and then drove down to Portsmouth and the command ship HMS Prins Albert to be on hand when the paratroopers made it back from France. The mission upon the German Würzburg radar station had been a complete success, with vital parts of the radar device recovered for examination.

Following the raid, the King and Queen visited Dishforth. Pickard led them on a tour of the base. When they arrived at the officer's lounge, the King noted a number of footprints on the ceiling, and inquired how they came to be there. Pickard had a party piece of drinking beer while being held upside down, and confessed the post-raid party had led to some hi-jinks and the footprints were his.

In May 1942 Pickard was awarded a second DSO for his part in the Bruneval raid, represented by a bar to the first DSO.

== 161 (Special Duties) Squadron ==
On 1 October 1942 Pickard was posted as CO of the No. 161 Squadron, a clandestine special duties squadron involved in supporting the resistance movement in occupied Europe. Pickard took over from Edward Fielden who was moved to station commander of the airfield they were operating out of, RAF Tempsford. In taking over 161 Squadron Pickard had a significant load of administrative duties. These he directed his aide to handle, giving his aide responsibility for all his official correspondence and reports.

Despite his laid back appearance, Pickard was a very active commanding officer, who wanted his men flying missions. In the eight months prior to Pickard, 161 Squadron ran 10 successful Lysander operations, delivering 15 agents and taking 10 men out. The tempo at Tempsford increased with Pickard's arrival. In the first three months Pickard's group had managed 11 successful operations, delivering 20 agents and taking out 14. RAF Historian Chris Ward remarked: "Pick knew only how to lead from the front, and he would carry out numerous daring single handed flights in Lysanders to drop and pick up agents in France on behalf of the SOE and SIS organizations."

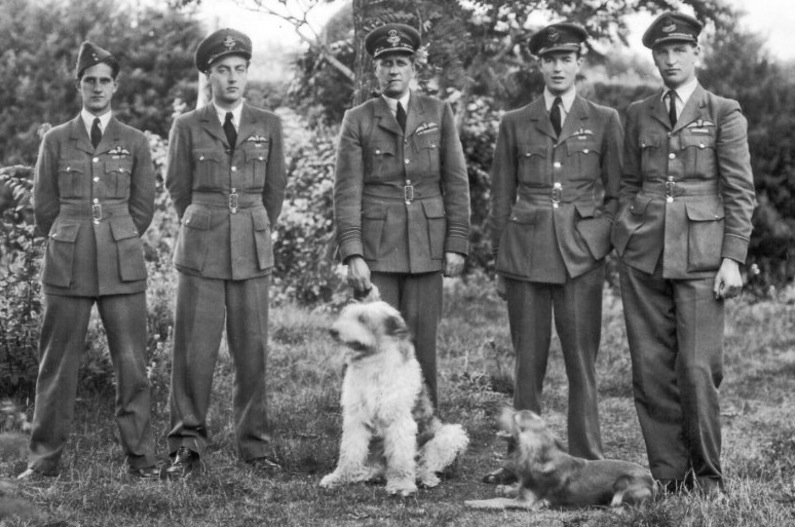
161 pilots Jim McCairns, Hugh Verity, Pickard, Peter Vaughan-Fowler and Bunny Rymills in the garden area behind the Tangmere cottage, 1943

In his time there Pickard gathered a talented team of pilots around him, including Hugh Verity, Frank Rymills, Peter Vaughan-Fowler and Jim McCairns. (Note: An assessment of the SD squadrons sent to Intel Air Ministry in the spring of 1943 stated: "161 Squadron have six very good crews, and the squadron is commanded by W/Cdr Pickard who has previous experience of this sort of thing.") Pickard was keen to fly missions, and took part in many of the 'moonlight operations'. After some months of service together Hugh Verity, the officer commanding 161's 'A' Flight, remarked wryly to his wife: "I am being restrained from personal effort by Pick, who thinks I have been hogging. I like that, coming from him, the biggest hog of the lot". In the case of Rymills, the two men met following a near mishap. Rymills had just completed a supply drop mission for their sister squadron 138, and was taxiing his Halifax off the tarmac when he nearly ran Pickard down. Seeing him later in the officer's lounge, the two got on about flying. Pickard challenged, saying "Any clot can fly four engines. Why don't you try to do some real flying with us?" Rymills was a highly confident pilot, and took to Pickard straight away. That evening he packed up his gear and moved over to 161.

Two months in, on the night of November 22/23, while returning from an agent drop off Pickard was intercepted by three German night fighters. Taking advantage of the Lysander's low stall speed he was able to slip the initial attacks, then dived to get into cloud. Playing a cat and mouse game through the cloud he was eventually able to work his way out over the Channel and back to safety. Night fighters were a concern for the pick-up pilots, but not their chief concern. Their greatest worry was mud. A mud-sodden field meant a one way trip, and no one cared for the idea of being taken prisoner in occupied France.

When on operations during the full moon period the 'A' Flight would move forward to RAF Tangmere which is on the coast, 100 miles south of Tempsford. The move extended the reach of 'A' Flight's Lysanders into Europe. 161 Squadron would deliver SOE agents, wireless operators and wireless equipment to the resistance. Out of France they carried political leaders, resistance leaders and agents whose cover had been blown. They also occasionally gave a lift out to evading Allied airmen. They had the goal of making their pick-up operations as reliable as a London taxi service.

When the number of people needed to be picked up was more than three, 161 Squadron would send two Lysanders in missions they called "a double." The required coordination was difficult to do at night in radio silence, and necessarily placed the second aircraft at increased risk. Consideration was given to making use of a larger aircraft. Sticky Murphy had already done a pick-up using an Anson borrowed from a training unit, but the type was deemed underpowered and inappropriate for pick-ups. The squadron also had available a Lockheed Hudson brought over from the King's Flight. The twin-engined aircraft had a range 200 miles (320 km) greater than the Lysander, and was faster. It allowed use of a navigator, taking the burden of navigation off the shoulders of the pilot. Most importantly, it had the capacity to carry ten passengers, instead of the Lysander's three. On the down side the Hudson's greater weight and higher stall speed required a much larger field to land on.

The use of the Hudson for pick-up missions was developed by Pickard and Hugh Verity. By trial flights Pickard had learned the Hudson's stall speed was actually some 20 mph slower than what was stated in the plane's manual. Pickard showed Verity how to land a Hudson short, and together they worked out the operating procedures that enabled this aircraft to operate over occupied France. The Hudson was 11 tons to the Lysander's 4 tons, and took 1,000 yards to land versus the 500 yards needed for the Lyzzie. To accommodate this, the flare path was extended to 450 yards by adding two lamps. Pickard executed the first Hudson operation on the night of 13/14 February, flying five agents into a field by Charolles near the River Loire. The development of the Hudson as a pick-up aircraft gave the squadron the ability to carry in and bring out groups of as many as ten people using a single aircraft.

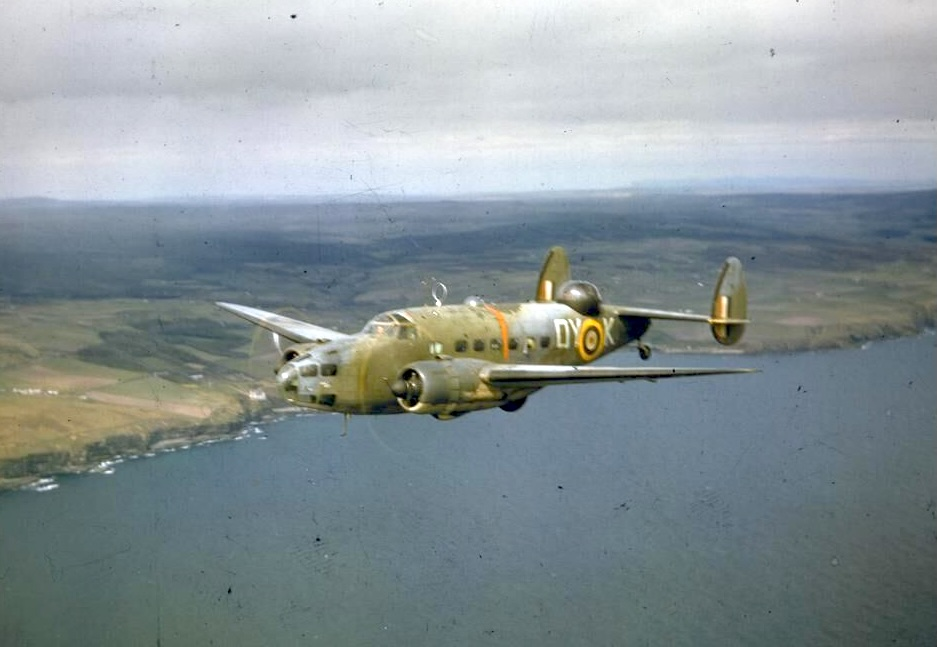
A Hudson in flight

New Year's revelry saw Pickard fracturing his wrist. He had mastered the trick of drinking while being held upside down, with his feet held on the ceiling, he celebrated the New Year. On this night his mates were not firmly fixed and, with their support wavering, he fell to the ground, fracturing his wrist. The mishap had little impact on his operational readiness, as he continued to fly pick-up missions with his wrist in a plaster cast.

Pickard was a very tenacious pilot. Once committed to an operation he was doggedly determined to complete it. On 13 January 1943 he flew a Lysander pick-up mission, made difficult by poor weather and visibility. After two and a half hours of fighting the weather he arrived over the target field, but he did not receive the recognition signal from the ground. Not wanting to return empty handed, he began circling. He continued to do so for the next two hours, till he was getting very near the limit of his fuel for the return flight, all while he searched in vain for the signal. Finally the operator flashed him the recognition signal. Pickard flashed back the day's Morse letter response and immediately brought his aircraft down. He was only on the ground for three minutes before he was back up in the air and headed for home. Normally he never questioned his passengers, but he had to ask why it had taken so long for them to arrive at the field. They replied they had been there the whole time, but thought the airplane was supposed to signal them first! Thinking the aircraft they heard overhead might be German, they just waited. Unfortunately the delay put them all in a tight spot as far as fuel was concerned. Pickard decided their best chance was to head to the closest airfield, at Predannack on the southern tip of England. Nearly across the Channel and with the airfield in sight, he heard the engine sputter and then cut out for lack of fuel. Pickard feathered the propeller and hoped for the best. With no chance to do a circuit, he brought the aircraft straight in and executed a perfect dead stick landing. Unfamiliar with air travel, his passengers were completely unaware of the danger, and thought a landing performed with the engine killed and propeller feathered was their normal operation!

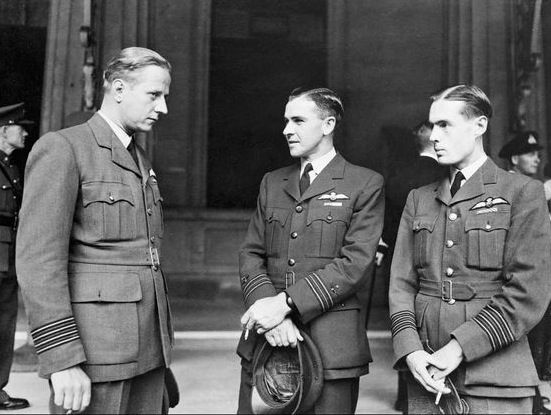
Pickard, Sqn Ldr William Blessing and Gp Capt. Leonard Cheshire at their investiture at Buckingham Palace, 28 July 1943. Of the three, only Cheshire would survive the war

Pick-up pilots had to have individual initiative. As Pickard was fond to say, "There's always bloody something!" On the night of 23/24 February 1943 Pickard took a Hudson to a field in the Tournais/Cuisery region of central France. Flying in very poor weather, the target field was covered in low cloud and fog. Pickard circled overhead searching, and made no less than twenty attempts to get down through the weather. After some two hours of trying he was finally successful, but landed hard and off the signal path. At the end of his landing run the aircraft became stuck in mud. In his rough French Pickard called out to the crowd: "Qui est le chef de cette bande de sauvages?!" (Fr: Who is in charge of this band of savages?!) One operator raised his hand, to whom Pickard added: "Well you've got nothing to be proud about. Not only have you landed me in the back of a brick yard, but in the center of a bog into the bargain." The plane's crew and passengers jumped out, and with the reception team they worked for a half hour before getting the aircraft free. Taxiing back toward the A lamp they had travelled no more than a quarter of the distance before becoming stuck again. This time they were in deep and could not get out. After two hours, it looked like they were going to have to burn the airplane and try to get back on foot, when about fifty Frenchmen from the village showed up with a horse. With the horse pulling and the aircraft at full throttle, they were just able to get the aircraft free. Their troubles were not over though, as the wet and muddy field made it difficult for the Hudson to get up enough speed to get airborne. Running down the field at full throttle, Pickard just barely got the aircraft airborne, when from out of the fog and darkness loomed a tree. Flying just above stall speed, there was no pulling back on the stick. They had to just keep flying and hope for the best. The left wing whacked through the outstretched branches, but the aircraft stayed aloft. The outer wing tip was damaged, a bit of garland was strewn along the leading edge, and the auto pilot was knocked out of operation. Otherwise, they were in good shape. They cleared the French coast as dawn was breaking, and arrived back at Tempsford at 8:00 in the morning, at the end of a 9 1/2-hour trip. At their debriefings pick-up pilots were asked to grade the operator and the field he had selected. Regarding the target field, Pickard wrote: "As far as I know there is nothing wrong with the field they selected, but I should like to hear from the reception committee where I actually landed."

For his work at 161 squadron Pickard was honoured with his third DSO, awarded as a second bar to his first DSO. The description in the citation was rather vague due to the nature of the operations of 161 Squadron. The award made him the first officer of the RAF to be awarded a third DSO in course of the Second World War.

During the early planning for Operation Chastise, Guy Gibson sought Pickard's help to plan the route for the mission. 617 Squadron's commander valued Pickard's experience in low level flights over the continent. Pickard was able to provide Gibson with details of the position of the fixed German flak batteries, along with their tendencies in the positioning of flak ships and flak rail cars. Gibson greatly valued the information, and believed it allowed him to plot a course that avoided the majority of the German flak.

== Station commander, RAF Lissett ==
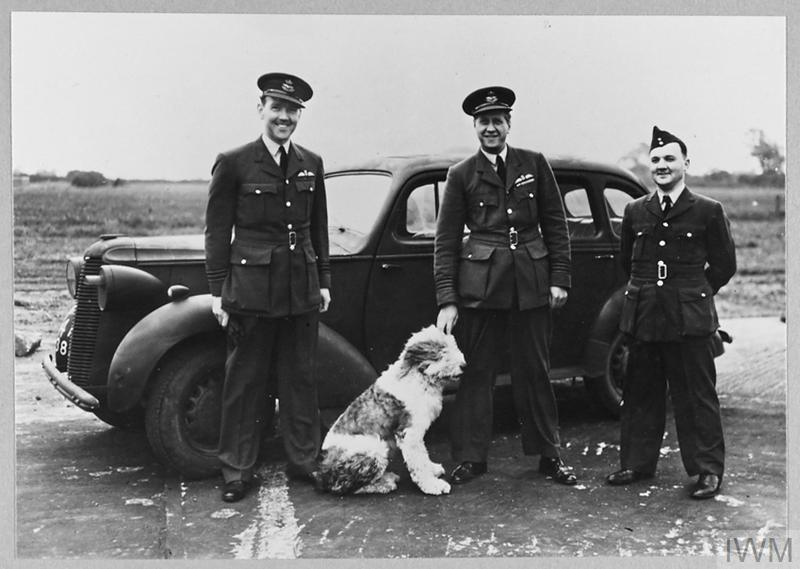
Wg Cdr Thomas Hope, Gp Capt. Charles Pickard with 'Ming', and Squadron Adjutant Flt Lt Johnson at RAF Lissett, 1943

Following the completion of his tour with 161 Squadron, Pickard was made station commander at RAF Lissett, taking the post in July 1943. The base was home to 158 Squadron, equipped with the Halifax. While there Pickard did his first familiarisation flight in a de Havilland Mosquito on 1 August. Administrative duties were not to his liking, and he was soon searching for a post with operations.

== No. 140 Wing ==
By late 1943 the RAF was making preparations for a return of Allied forces to the continent. Basil Embry, the commanding officer of the Second Tactical Air Force, commanded the light daylight bombing force. He wanted his force to perform precision attacks on the continent, and was pushing hard to get Mosquitos to replace the Ventura and Mitchell bombers a number of his squadrons were equipped with. The Ventura, in particular, was not liked by crews. Said Pickard "It had the flying characteristics of a suitcase, and the elegance of a turnip." 487 Squadron had flown the Ventura on the disastrous Operation Ramrod 16, which resulted in 10 of the 12 aircraft sent being lost, while another was written off afterwards due to damage. The losses reduced the squadron pilots to half strength, and there were no aircraft left for them to fly. Said Flight Lieutenant Charles Patterson "The Ventura must have been quite the worst aircraft ever sent into operation. Not only was it extremely limited from an operational standpoint, but it was also an absolute devil to fly, being heavy, cumbersome and unmanoeuverable."

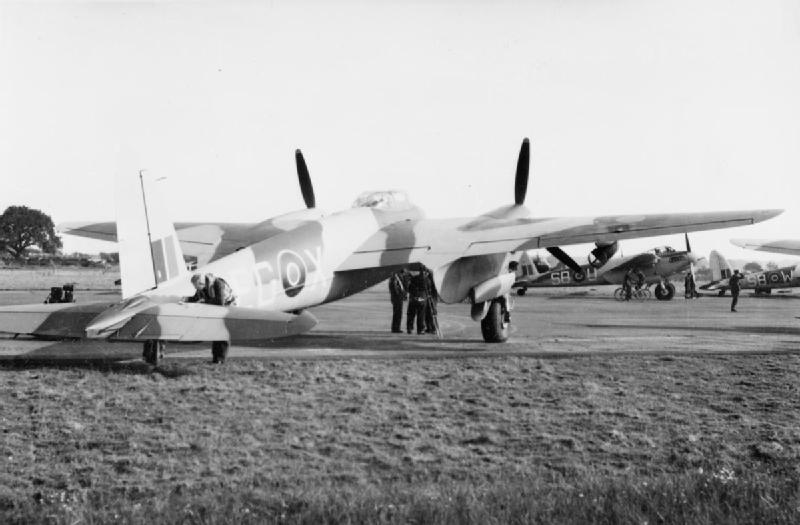
487 Squadron Mosquitos at RAF Sculthorpe prior to 140 Wing's first mission, a daylight attack upon a pair of power stations in France, 1943

Other light bomber squadrons equipped with the Ventura were 21 Squadron RAF and the Australian 464 Squadron RAAF. Patterson continues "Due to the dynamic drive and determination of Basil Embry, all three Ventura squadrons were re-equipped with the Mosquito FB VI fighter-bomber. A conversion flight formed at RAF Sculthorpe under Sq Ldr George Parry. We converted all three squadrons to Mosquitos in about six weeks. 464 and 487 got their Mosquitos in August, and 21 Squadron got theirs in September." Embry had his Mosquito Wing. He had been a very active CO, and continued to fly on operations, usually in the 3 spot in formation and flying under the name of "Wing Commander Smith". He was looking for a senior officer with a great deal of flying experience who had similar ideas on leadership. He found his man in Pickard. On 1 October Embry formed No. 140 Wing, choosing Pickard as the Wing's commanding officer. Embry insisted Pickard complete the conversion course on the Mosquito at RAF Sculthorpe, which he did. During the autumn these squadrons were learning the hard way what 105 Squadron had learned the previous year, namely don't give enemy gunners much of a look, stay low and fast on approach, "hopping" over hedges, houses and other obstructions, and using speed to escape.

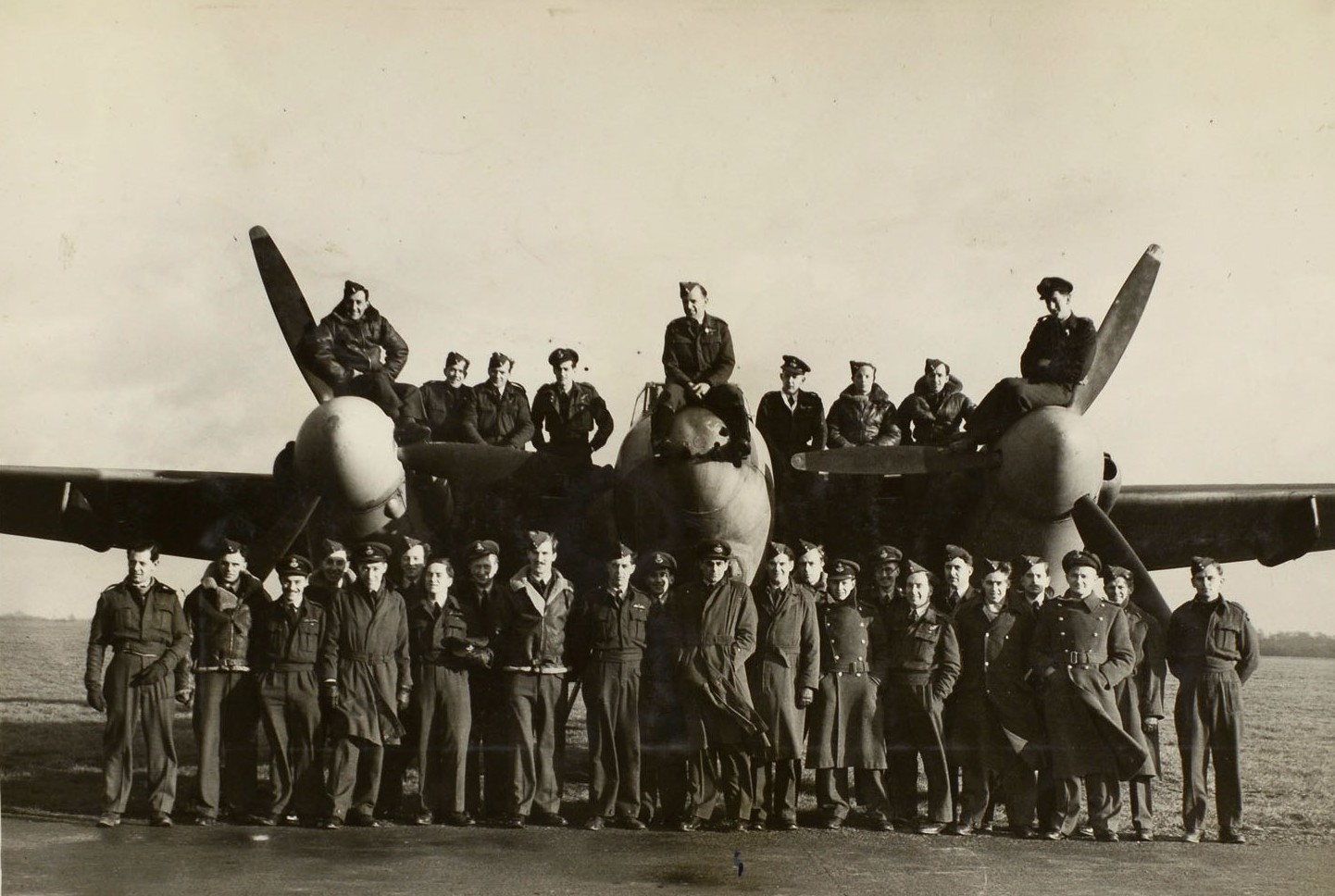
487 (NZ) Squadron at Hunsden, February 1944

487 Squadron gave Pickard a Mosquito, their "F" machine marked "EG F". They did this in honour of Pickard's Wellington "F for Freddie" in Target for To-Night. (Note: William Sugden, a flight commander in 464 Squadron wrote later, "Anyone meeting Charles Pickard for the first time, as I did in July 1943, could hardly fail to be impressed. Very tall, 6 feet 3-inch, blond, debonair, with an easy-going casual manner, plus three DSOs, a DFC, etc, a distinctive loping walk and invariably accompanied by his Old English sheep-dog, Ming. Most of us knew him by name since he had starred in the film Target for Tonight, flying a Wellington, 'F for Freddie'. We had heard about some of his 'cloak and dagger' operations, flown to the Continent from Tempsford, dropping and picking up agents by moonlight in Lysanders and the longer-range missions in Hudsons; we were familiar, too, with his ditching in the North Sea and the dropping of paratroops at Bruneval. We knew he would not be a chairborne CO. Not many were in 2 Group, as Embry insisted on almost everyone seeing a bit of the war. Even the doctors and padres were encouraged to have a go! Pickard would certainly need no encouragement on that score.") Pickard was soon back at the sharp end. On 3 October, he flew with 487 Squadron in a raid against the power station at Pont Chateau. On Pickard's approach to the target he took a hard hit to his starboard engine, which seized up solid. He was unable to feather the blades. Nevertheless, he continued his run in and delivered his bombs on the target. Then he set about trying to get back to England. The nearest field was again at RAF Predannack in the south of England, this time some 370 miles away. He arrived there just as his fuel ran out. With no fuel for a circuit, he was given clearance to come straight in and land. The power station was badly damaged by the raid and all 12 aircraft returned safely, though Pickard's aircraft was out of operations for a couple of weeks for repairs.

On the afternoon of 19 November 1943, Pickard returned to Framlingham, arriving on the Parham airfield. The Framlingham old boy had become a hero at the school. Each time Pickard was invested with another decoration from the King, the headmaster of the school had let all the boys off for a celebratory holiday. Now, the boy who had been a near washout returned to the college to address the boys there. He spoke for two hours, remarking on his experiences flying, but mostly commenting on the Mosquito and its utility as a marking aircraft and a precision daylight bomber. He was reported to have delivered this talk with "a most interesting and unvarnished account of his experiences, delivered in a notably human and intimate style and of absorbing interest".

On 1 December 1943 Pickard was joined at 140 Wing by his navigator, Flight Lieutenant Alan Broadley. Broadley was posted to 21 Squadron, but Pickard made him Wing Navigational Officer in January, and the two flew together for the duration.

About this time Leonard Cheshire was looking for a smaller aircraft to use for low-level marking, and came over to ask Pickard about the feasibility of using the de Havilland Mosquito. Cheshire had just taken command of 617 Squadron. Known as the Dambusters, the squadron was struggling after the departure of Guy Gibson and a number of losses suffered following their success on the Ruhr dams raid. On 19 December 1943 Cheshire visited Pickard, who took him up for a short test flight in the Mosquito. Impressed, Cheshire was eventually able to obtain four Mosquitos for his squadron, where they were used to good effect.

In January 1944 140 Wing was moved to RAF Hunsdon. It was from here that Pickard led the daylight raid on 18 February to bomb a prison at Amiens in what proved to be one of the most famous low-level attacks of all time.

=== Amiens prison raid (Operation Jericho) ===
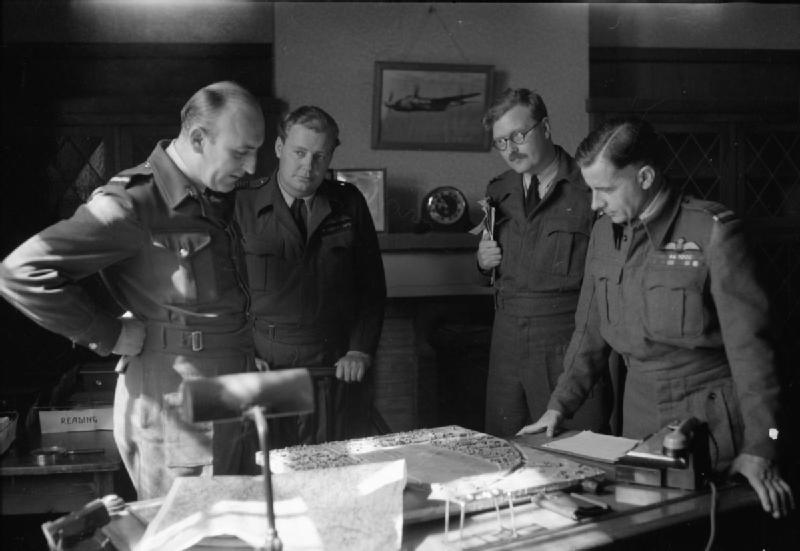
Basil Embry, far right

In February 1944 the RAF was given a special mission to bomb a prison in Amiens, northern France. Beside some 520 regular criminals, 180 Maquis were confined there by the Gestapo. The circumstances involving the request and the true purpose of the mission remain among the secrets of the war. Reportedly the request to bomb the prison came from the French resistance whose members were scheduled to be executed. However, after the war an RAF probe revealed the French resistance leaders were first made aware of the raid when the RAF requested detailed information on the target. The French resistance acquired the information requested and transmitted it back to England, not knowing the purpose of the request.

Basil Embry, commanding officer of the Second Tactical Air Force, was given the job of breaching the prison. The walls of the prison were three feet thick and 20 feet high. Initially rocket firing Typhoons were to be deployed to break holes into the prison walls, but Embry soon changed this to Mosquitos, dropping bombs at low altitude. A daylight precision attack would be the only way to deliver the bombs accurately enough to damage the prison without killing all the prisoners. Embry was central to the planning of the raid. He timed the attack for noon, when most of the guards would be sitting down to lunch. He planned for his planes to blast holes in the walls of the prison and destroy the mess hall and guard barracks. The mission had to be completed before 19 February, as this was the day Embry was told the prisoners were to be executed.

The attack was to be made in three waves of six Mosquitos each. Each squadron formed two vics, with one vic breaking away near the target to approach the prison from the northwest, while the other followed the old Roman road all the way in. 487 Squadron was tasked with breaching the prison walls. 464 Squadron would destroy the guard's barracks and mess. If the first two waves failed in breaching the walls, 21 Squadron was given the unusual job of destroying the prison and killing everyone inside. Close escort for the bombers would be provided by Hawker Typhoons from four squadrons, 174 Squadron and 245 Squadron from RAF Westhampnett, and 3 Squadron and 198 Squadron from RAF Manston.

Embry had intended to be on the raid, however because of his knowledge of the planning underway for the Normandy invasion air marshal Trafford Leigh-Mallory strictly forbade him from going, as his capture was a risk that could not be accepted. The command of the raid then fell to Pickard, who would be responsible to call in or call off the third wave of aircraft tasked with destroying the prison itself, and all the prisoners held inside. Pickard elected to fly in the second group with five aircraft from 464 Squadron, taking up the position at the tail of the formation. The mission, called Operation Renovate, was scheduled for 16 February.

The weather was very poor in mid-February, with snow fall and low cloud making take-offs and landings treacherous. On 16 February the base was sealed, with no one permitted to enter or leave. However the mission was scrubbed that first day and then the next, due to the poor weather. Snow flurries and very poor visibility on 18 February made completing the mission that day unlikely as well, but it was their last chance. New Zealand Pilot Officer Maxwell Sparks recalled:

"The loud speaker broke rudely into my sleep early on that February morning. It barked the list of aircrews who were wanted at the briefing room at once. My own name was on the list. Of all things it was snowing. If we were being yanked out of bed to fly in that stuff, it must be either some kind of practice, or some kind of practical joke. But when we found guards posted at the briefing room and they asked us to prove our identity, we knew there was neither a joke nor a practice in the air."

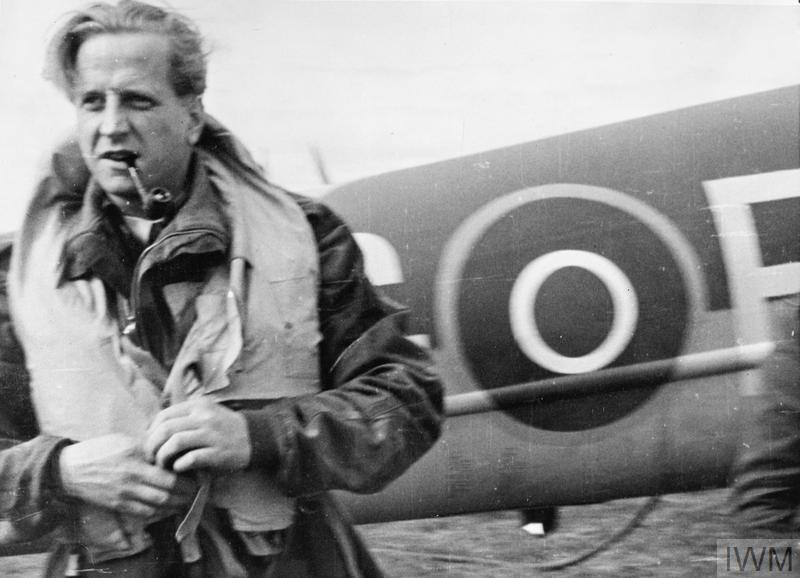
Pickard stands in front of his Mosquito "F-Freddie" in February, 1944 shortly before the Amiens raid

Embry was present for the mission briefing. Pickard described the purpose of the mission and the particulars as to how it was to be carried out. A model of the prison was presented to provide a visual representation of the target. To keep below enemy radar, the mission would be flown entirely at low level, 50 feet or less both inbound and homebound. Strict radio silence was to be observed throughout. The ground around the prison was flat and free of trees, houses, or other obstructions. On the bomb run they would have to fly low and slow. They were essentially skip bombing, and would need a low, slow release to control the flight of the bombs.

At the end of the briefing, Pickard, who had spent many months supporting the resistance while flying with 161 Squadron, emphasised the importance of the mission: "It's a death-or-glory show. If it succeeds it will be one of the most worthwhile ops of the war. If you never do anything else you can still count this as the finest job you could ever have done."

Their route would leave Hunsdon flying south, bending around London to reach the coast at Littlehampton, where they were to rendezvous with their fighter escort. From there they would head out over the channel, flying southeast to cross the French coast at Le Treport. Rising up over the cliffs, they would bend their course easterly and follow the Bresle river to Senarpont, where they would make a hard left hand turn. They would continue on, flying over the Somme estuary to reach Bourdon, 18 miles southeast of Abbeville. They would continue on to Doullens, where they would make a hard right turn and cover the 15 miles south to Bouzincourt. There they would bend their course to the right and travel another two miles to Albert, where they would make their final hard right to place them on course toward Amiens, following the long, straight Albert-Amiens road till they reached the prison.

At the start of the mission, pilot Bill Sugden noted:

"It was still snowing thickly as we climbed aboard, but then came a slight lull. It still looked impossible to take off, but we saw Pick loping towards his F for Freddie, stuffing out his pipe and giving Ming a final pat. With his engines starting we realized the game was on. Within minutes we were all airborne, visibility nil. I was flying No. 2 to Bob Iredale but never saw him or anyone else. It was like flying in a blancmange."

One by one, they lifted off into a swirling white mass of cloud and snow. They could not fly formation, and were lucky to avoid flying into one another. Two Mosquitos of 21 Squadron aborted, as did one from 487 Squadron.

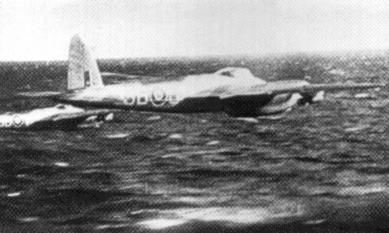
Mosquitos crossing the channel on the Amiens prison raid

487 Squadron arrived over Littlehampton with visibility still poor. Failing to see any escorting fighters, they headed out over the Channel. Shortly thereafter they broke through the cloud and were soon flying in bright sunlight. They crossed low over the wave tops. Late to the rendezvous, the Typhoons of 174 Squadron assigned to cover the first group did not link up. They flew out over the Channel anyway, taking a short cut across the route to try to catch up. Behind them, the fighters of 245 Squadron linked with the second group as planned, but with two less aircraft then slated, as they had been forced to abort. The four remaining Typhoons flew out across the channel with their bombers. 3 Squadron never got airborne. There was a whiteout over their airfield, and their commander refused to allow them to take off in such conditions.

Reaching the low cliffs of the French coast, they flew up and over, low enough to pull snow up off the fields below them as they crossed over the Somme estuary. The Typhoons of 174 Squadron suddenly appeared among them, weaving in and joining up at odd angles. The group made their hard right turn at Doulens and headed south to Albert. Unfortunately the first wave missed the turning point at Albert and flew on past. By the time they realized their mistake and turned toward the road they were a couple minutes behind schedule. Coming up behind them, the second wave was now following too close. They would arrive over the target just as the fused bombs of the first wave would be going off. Seeing all this in front of him, Wing Commander "Black" Smith placed his six Mosquitoes in a wide orbit south of the Albert-Amiens road to allow time for the first wave to clear. This decision, though correct, had the misfortune of placing Pickard directly in harms way.

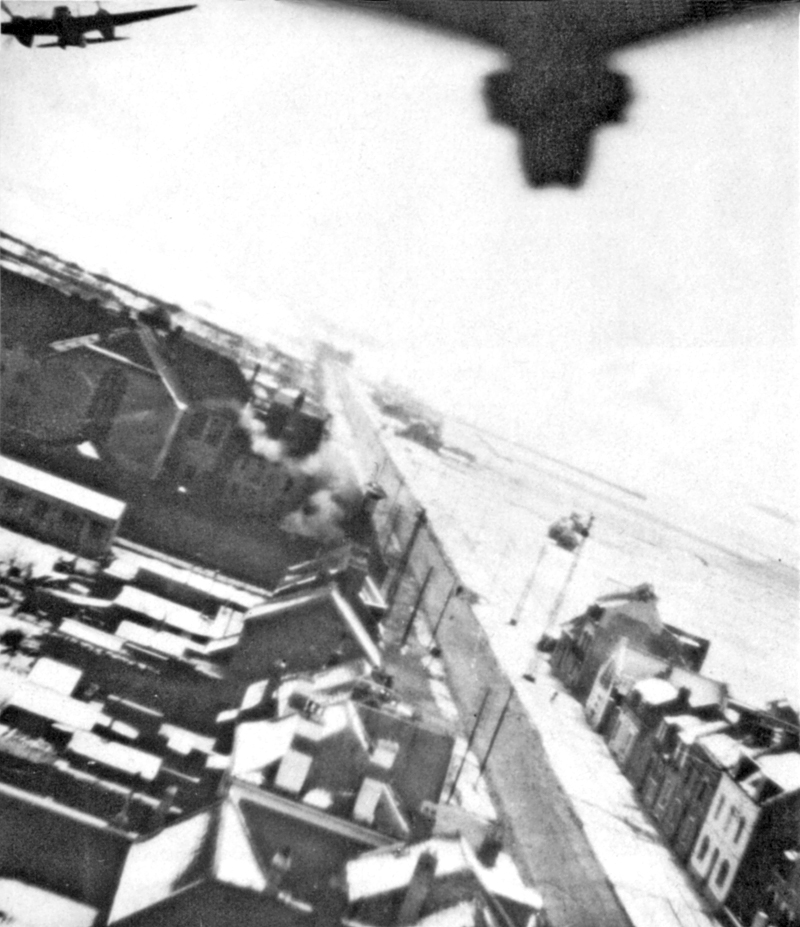
A pair of Mosquitos of 487 Squadron clear the snow covered Amiens prison just before the fused bombs they dropped explode

As 487 Squadron closed on the Amiens Prison, the aircraft split into two groups to attack the prison from the north and east, slowing to 200 mph to release their bombs. Three Mosquitos of No 487 Squadron came in at 10 feet and attacked the eastern wall at 1203 hours. They released and pulled up, just clearing the wall. One pilot recalled looking up over his shoulder to see a guard in the tower standing with mouth open in surprise. The leading aircraft's bombs were seen to hit the wall five feet above the ground. Bomb blasts were seen upon the east wall, while other bombs overshot their target and exploded in the fields beyond.

As the approach was playing out a training flight from JG 26 with 10 Focke-Wulf Fw 190s was airborne to the north of Amiens. They were notified of enemy aircraft over the Albert-Amiens road and were instructed to investigate. Leading the formation was Oberleutnant Waldemar Radener, who ordered his flight to drop through the bottom of the cloud cover to see what they might see. As they did they found a number of Typhoon and Mosquito aircraft below them. Radener quickly slipped in behind a Typhoon and shot it down. None of the Allied pilots even knew he was there. The pilot in question survived and was taken prisoner, thinking his aircraft had been hit by flak. Meanwhile, Feldwebel Wilhelm Mayer observed a group of six Mosquitos executing a large turn. He swung his plane in behind the last aircraft.

As the aircraft of 464 Squadron were halfway through their turn Pickard must have seen tracer shells fly past the canopy of his aircraft, for he suddenly broke off his turn and straightened out. His situation was dire. To escape he needed speed. As the Focke-wulf lined up a second shot Pickard abruptly jinked to the left with a hard banking turn. The closing Focke-wulf had just an instant to fire. The cockpit and wing root of Pickard's aircraft slipped out of the frame, but the rear of the aircraft did not. Machine gun and cannon fire struck the fuselage just ahead of the tail. The wooden frame crumbled under the weight of the shells, causing the tail section to break away. The aircraft flipped over onto its back and dived into the ground near the village of Saint-Gratien. The engagement was over, less than a minute after Mayer had broken through the cloud cover.

There was nothing Pickard could have done to get out from under the guns of the German fighter when it suddenly appeared behind him. He was flying a larger, heavier airplane, carrying a bomb load, flying at reduced speed and on the deck. He could not dive away from trouble. He could not dump his bomb load quickly enough to accelerate away. He could not out turn the opponent. Pickard was probably the best pilot in the Wing. He had far more hours flying, had been flying the Mosquito longer, was experienced on many types of aircraft and had extensive time flying aerobatics. His loss was not a question of flying skill or experience with the Mosquito. French farmers on the ground witnessed the brief air battle and attested to the events. After Pickard's plane went down they rushed to the crash site, but both men were already dead. The Frenchmen hid the identification tags and decorations of the aviators.

A couple minutes later the rest of 464 delivered its bombs on the prison and exited the area. As they left the mess hall and guard's barracks were rocked by explosions. A few moments later "Hello Daddy. Red, Red, Red" was heard over the radio. 'Daddy' was the nickname of Wing Commander Ivor "Daddy" Dale, 21 Squadron's commander. "Red" was the signal to break off the attack. However, the voice was not that of Pickard.

F/Lt Tony Wickham was flying the PRU Mosquito, circling the target at 400 to 500 feet while P/O Leigh Howard used a cine film camera to record the effects of the bomb blasts. The most dangerous place for an aircraft to be on a bombing mission is over the target. After two passes Wickham was anxious to get out, but Howard, absorbed in the images he was getting, asked for a third pass. The two remained there seven minutes, circling the prison three times between 1203 and 1210 hours. On the final pass the buildings of the complex could be seen to have suffered significant damage. In addition, a large breach had formed in the south wall, several small ones in the north wall, and a very large breach opened up where the west and north walls joined. Men could be seen running through the courtyard and out into the fields, exiting through the large breach. The escape was underway, leaving no need to destroy the prison. Not hearing anything from Pickard, Wickham issued the recall order to the four approaching aircraft of 21 Squadron and cleared out.

=== Aftermath ===
Pickard and Broadley were initially reported missing. In September 1944 it was announced they had been 'killed in action'. The two had flown over 100 sorties together. Pickard is buried in plot 3, row B, grave 13 at St Pierre Cemetery near Amiens, France. Broadley is buried in plot 3, row A, grave 11 of the same cemetery. 140 Wing lost a second Mosquito on the raid when it was hit by flak on the way out, and two Typhoon aircraft failed to return as well.

The French government called for Pickard to be awarded a posthumous Victoria Cross, and their request was seconded by Lord Londonderry. However Basil Embry declined to support the citation. He knew Pickard was a fine pilot and an excellent leader. However, the low level bombing mission he died on was a task typical for 140 Wing, and other than flying through very bad weather, there was nothing unusual in Pickard's conduct during the mission. Good men flew off and failed to come back all the time. This was the daily experience of life in Bomber Command. Embry was very sorry for it, but Pickard's loss was a cost of war, one of many they had to bear. The French also sought to award Pickard their Légion d’Honneur and the Croix de Guerre, but these could not be accepted, as British policy forbade the acceptance of posthumous awards from foreign countries. Pickard's family has petitioned to allow the awards.

Pickard's log book records that he flew nearly 2200 hours during his RAF career, piloting 41 different aircraft, and not counting those missions he flew with the Czechs and those he flew with 138 while on leave, he carried out bombing raids and clandestine operations against the enemy on 103 occasions.

== Pickard as an officer ==
Friends described Pickard as "quiet, thoughtful and seemingly imperturbable." He possessed a great deal of physical courage. Pickard was the living embodiment of the "press on, regardless" attitude so valued by Bomber Command. It was not unusual for Pickard's aircraft to return from missions the worse for wear, a mark of his determination to get his plane over the target. It was this determination and his leadership by example that were the hallmarks of his RAF career. Pickard was persevering, understated and the possessor of a manner which endeared him to both the general public and the men of his command. He was a natural to play the part of Dixon in Target for To-Night. Standing an imposing six feet four, he was nevertheless a gentle man with boyish charm. His pipe was always at hand, and he was invariably accompanied by his sheepdog 'Ming'. He loved animals of all kinds. He also loved flying, and repeatedly sought to be off on a sortie. He resisted being rested or being sent to "safe" postings. Though approachable and humorous on the ground, on missions he was very determined.

As an air commander he expected his men to be flying. He sought to treat them fairly, and would never ask them to take a risk he would not ask of himself. Popular with his men, he did not seek their admiration. Looking back years later, the woman who had been Broadley's fiancée, Kitty Jeffery, described Pickard as "tall, dashing, very foolhardy at times, a bit of a lad." Writing about him later, Basil Embry wrote "It is impossible to measure Charles Pickard's loss to the RAF and Britain, but in courage, devotion to duty, fighting spirit and powers of real leadership, he stood out as one of the great airmen of the war, and a shining example of British manhood."

== Personal ==
Following the war his wife Dorothy returned to Africa with their son Nicholas, to live in Highlands, Southern Rhodesia.

Growing up he was known as 'Boy' to his family, Charles to his school teachers, and 'Pick' to his friends and comrades.

A year after his death his family ran a note in The Times to his memory, which read:

In proud and glorious memory of our "Boy", Group Capt. P.C. Pickard, DSO, DFC, who with his brave and gallant Navigator for 4 1/2 years, Flt Lieut. Alan Broadley, DSO, DFC, DFM, did not return from Amiens a year ago today. Remembering also his many friends, whom he was not afraid to join. - Mother
Horses he loved, laughter and the sun.
A dog, wide spaces and the open air.

Historical author Chris Hobbs wrote: "His long operational career, covering many aspects of aerial conflict, included some of the most daring episodes in the RAF's history. In Air Force circles he was admired for his consistent leadership, determination and courage."

== Honours ==
- United Kingdom: Distinguished Flying Cross 30 July 1940
- United Kingdom: Distinguished Service Order 7 March 1941
- Czechoslovakia: Czechoslovak War Cross 1939–1945 15 July 1941
- United Kingdom: Distinguished Service Order 26 May 1942 (Note: Acting Wing Commander, 51 Squadron, Royal Air Force. Citation reads: This officer has made his squadron an extremely efficient bombing force. He has extracted the maximum effort from all, at the same time promoting and fostering an excellent comradeship between flying personnel and ground staff thus instilling the team spirit so necessary to achieve success. He has instituted a fine spirit among his flying crews for accurate bombing and in obtaining photographs. On February 27th. 1942, he led the force of aircraft which carried the parachute troops who made the raid on Bruneval, thus again demonstrating his outstanding powers of leadership and organisation. By his courage, self-sacrifice and devotion to duty, this officer has set an example which, although attained by few, is admired by all." Second DSO awarded as a bar for on the ribbon of the first DSO.)
- United Kingdom: Distinguished Service Order, 26 March 1943 (Note: Acting Wing Commander, 161 Squadron, Royal Air Force. Citation reads: This officer has completed a very large number of operational missions and achieved much success. By his outstanding leadership, exceptional ability and fine fighting qualities, he has contributed in a large measure to the high standard of morale of the squadron he commands. Third DSO awarded as second bar for on the ribbon of the first DSO.)

== Bibliography ==
- Ashcroft, Michael (2013). Heroes of the Skies. Headline Book Publishing. ISBN 9780755363902.
- Bateman, Alex (2009). No 617 'Dambuster' Sqn. Osprey.
- Body, Robert (2016). Runways to Freedom: RAF Tempsford and the role of the Special Duties Squadrons.
- Bowman, Martin (2005) [1997]. Mosquito Bomber/Fighter-Bomber Units 1942-45. London: Osprey Publishing.
- Bowman, Martin (2012a) [2008]. Mosquito: menacing the Reich. Barnsley, South Yorkshire: Pen & Sword Aviation. ISBN 9781844684359.
- Bowman, Martin W (2012b). Mosquito missions : RAF and Commonwealth De Havilland mosquitos. Barnsley, S. Yorkshire: Pen & Sword Aviation. ISBN 978-1-78383-005-3. OCLC 1114423096.
- Bowman, Martin (2014) [2011]. The Mosquito Story. Stroud, Gloucestershire: The History Press. ISBN 9780752485294.
- Bowman, Martin (2016). The Bedford Triangle: Undercover Operations from England in World War II. Simon and Schuster.
- Bowman, Martin W (2004). Moskitopanik! : Mosquito fighters and fighter bomber operations in the Second World War. Pen & Sword Aviation. ISBN 978-1-78303-452-9. OCLC 1124541018.
- Bowyer, Chaz (2001). Bomber barons. London: Leo Cooper. ISBN 978-1-4738-1257-4. OCLC 880580142.
- Braddon, Russell (1954). Cheshire V.C. : a story of war and peace. Readers Book Club, in assoc. with the Companion Book Club, London : Hawthorn, Vic. OCLC 1085935488.
- Ford, Ken (2010). The Bruneval Raid. Oxford: Osprey Publishing.
- Frost, John (1991). Nearly there: some memoirs by John Frost of Arnhem Bridge. London: Cooper.
- Frost, John (2009) [1980]. A Drop Too Many. Barnsley, South Yorkshire: Pen & Sword Books Limited.
- Gibson, Guy (2019). Enemy coast ahead: the illustrated memoir of Dambuster Guy Gibson. Barnsley, S. Yorkshire: Greenhill Books. ISBN 978-1-78438-491-3. OCLC 1112153051.
- Grehan, John (1988). RAF and the SOE: Special Duty Operations in Europe. Barnsley, South Yorkshire: Frontline Books. ISBN 9781473894136.
- Hamilton, Alexander (1977). Wings of Night: Secret Missions of Group Captain Pickard, DSO and Two Bars, DFC. Crecy Bks. ISBN 978-0-7183-0415-7.
- Jackson, Robert (2005). Hit and Run: Daring Air Attacks in World War II. Barnsley, South Yorkshire: Pen & Sword Aviation. ISBN 9781783460199.
- Jacobs, Peter (2015). Daring Raids of World War Two: Heroic Land, Sea and Air Attacks. Barnsley, South Yorkshire: Pen & Sword Aviation.
- Jones, R.V. (2017) [1978]. The Wizard War: British Scientific Intelligence 1939-1945. Brattleboro, Vermont: Echo Point Books & Media. ISBN 978-1-63561-054-3.
- McCairns, James (2016). Lysander pilot: secret operations with 161 Squadron. Chichester: Tangmere Military Aviation Museum.
- O'Connor, Bernard (2010). RAF Tempsford : Churchill's most secret airfield. Stroud: Amberley.
- Oldfield, Paul (2013). Bruneval. South Yorkshire: Pen & Sword Military.
- Oliver, David (2005). Airborne Espionage. Stroud, UK: Sutton Publishing Limited.
- Otter, Patrick (2013). 1 group : swift to attack : bombers command's unsung heroes. Pen & Sword Aviation. ISBN 978-1-78159-094-2. OCLC 840660637.
- Saunders, H. St G. (1975) [1954]. Royal Air Force 1939–1945: The Fight is Won. History of the Second World War. Vol. III (pbk. repr. ed.). London: HMSO. ISBN 978-0-11-771594-3 – via Hyperwar Foundation.
- Shores, Christopher F; Thomas, Chris (2004). 2nd Tactical Air Force. Hersham, Surrey: Classic. ISBN 1-903223-40-7. OCLC 405639367.
- Verity, Hugh (2000) [1978]. We landed by moonlight : secret RAF landings in France, 1940-1944. Crécy. ISBN 9780947554750. OCLC 680454145.
- Vance, Jonathan (2000). A Gallant Company. Pacifica Military. ISBN 978-0-935-55347-5.
- Ward, Chris (2007). 5 Group Bomber Command : an operational record. Pen & Sword Aviation. ISBN 978-1-84415-579-8. OCLC 475213900.
- Ward, Chris; Smith, Steve (2008). 3 Group Bomber Command. Barnsley, South Yorkshire: Pen & Sword Books Limited.
