= No. 161 Squadron RAF =

Defunct flying squadron of the Royal Air Force

- Active: 9 May 1918 – 17 August 1918; 15 February 1942 – 2 June 1945
- Country: United Kingdom
- Branch: Royal Air Force
- Motto: Liberate

Insignia
- Squadron badge heraldry: An open fetterlock
- Squadron codes: MA Feb 1942 - 1945; JR Apr 1944 - 1945 (Lysander Flight only)

No. 161 (Special Duties) Squadron was a highly secretive unit of the Royal Air Force, performing missions as part of the Royal Air Force Special Duties Service. It was tasked with missions of the Special Operations Executive (SOE) and the Secret Intelligence Service (SIS) during the Second World War. Their primary role was to drop and collect secret agents and equipment into and from Nazi-occupied Europe. The squadron had a secondary role in acting as the King's Flight, where it was responsible for transporting royal family members.

== History ==
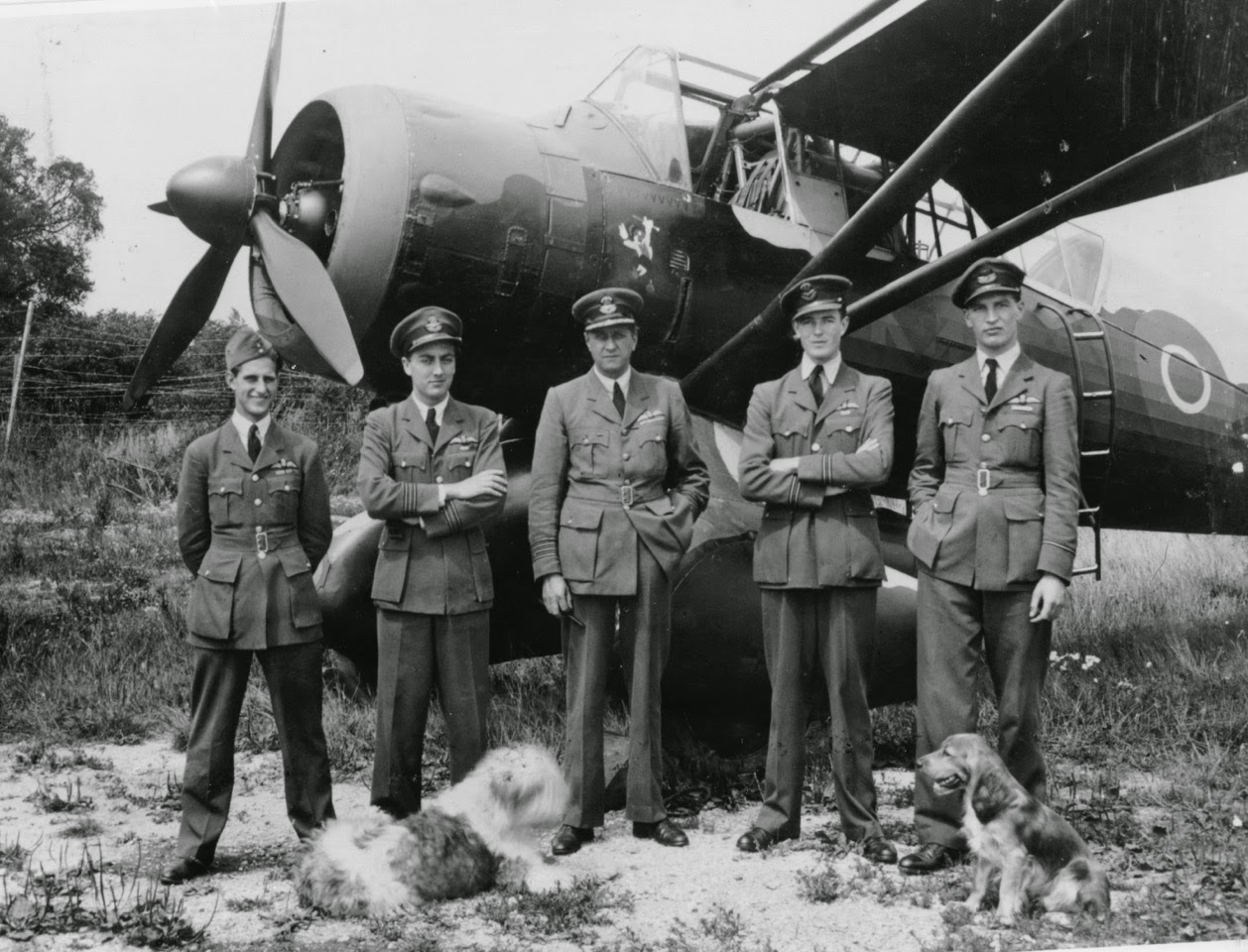
No. 161 Squadron Lysander at Tangmere 1943

The squadron was formed at RAF Newmarket on 15 February 1942 from 138 Squadron's Lysander flight and a flight of Whitleys and Wellingtons. These were combined with pilots and aircraft from the King's Flight to create the second SD squadron. The unit was commanded by Edward Fielden, an experienced pilot who had been the CO of the King's Flight. He inherited two very experienced officers in Guy Lockhart and "Sticky" Murphy from 138. 161's A Flight was made up of six Lysanders, with Guy Lockhart as its commanding officer. A Flight undertook the pick-up operations. The squadron's B Flight flew two-engine Whitleys and Wellingtons, and did agent parachute drops and supply drop missions.

In April 1942 the squadron joined 138 Squadron at RAF Tempsford in Bedfordshire. It remained there for the duration of its service. In November 1942 the B Flight's Whitleys were replaced with the four-engine Halifax.

Following the end of the war in Europe, the squadron was disbanded 2 June 1945.

== Aircraft ==
Several types of aircraft were used by the squadron in the course of their duties.

- Westland Lysander February 1942 – November 1944
- Armstrong Whitworth Whitley V February 1942 – December 1942
- Havoc I February 1942 – December 1943
- Handley Page Halifax B.Mk II September 1942 – December 1942
- Armstrong Whitworth Albemarle October 1942 to April 1943
- Handley Page Halifax B.Mk V November 1942 to November 1944
- Lockheed Hudson III / V October 1943 – June 1945
- Short Stirling III and IV September 1943 – June 1945

The Lysanders and Hudsons were used for the landing and collection of agents, while the other types were used for parachuting agents and supplies. The Havocs were used as convoy escorts under the control of Coastal or Fighter Commands.
