= RAF Tuddenham =

Former Royal Air Force station in Suffolk, England

RAF Tuddenham
- Tuddenham, Suffolk in England

Site information
- Type: Royal Air Force Sub station
- Code: TD
- Owner: Ministry of Defence
- Operator: Royal Air Force
- Controlled by: RAF Bomber Command * No. 3 Group RAF

Location
- Shown within Suffolk RAF Tuddenham (the United Kingdom)
- Coordinates: 52°18′43″N 000°34′30″E

Site history
- Built: 1941
- Built by: M.J. Gleeson Ltd
- In use: October 1943–1947; 1959–July 1963
- Battles/wars: European theatre of World War II

Airfield information
- Elevation: 22 metres (72 ft) AMSL
Runways
Direction	Length and surface
06/24	1,230 metres (4,035 ft) Asphalt
12/30	1,755 metres (5,758 ft) Asphalt
18/36	1,180 metres (3,871 ft) Asphalt

Royal Air Force Tuddenham or RAF Tuddenham is a former Royal Air Force Sub station located 3.2 miles (5.1 km) south east of Mildenhall, Suffolk, England and 7.8 miles (12.6 km) north west of Bury St Edmunds, Suffolk.

== Station history ==
- No. 3 Lancaster Finishing School RAF.
- No. 90 Squadron RAF starting on 13 October 1943 with the Short Stirling III before changing to the Avro Lancaster I and III in May 1944 and leaving on 11 November 1946 to RAF Wyton.
- No. 138 Squadron RAF between 9 March 1945 and 12 November 1946 with the Avro Lancaster I and III before moving to RAF Wyton.
- No. 149 Squadron RAF between 29 April 1946 and 4 November 1946 with the Avro Lancaster I and III.
- No. 186 Squadron RAF reformed at RAF Tuddenham on 1 October 1944 with the Lancaster I and III before moving to RAF Stradishall on 17 December 1945 where the squadron disbanded on 17 July 1945.
- No. 207 Squadron RAF used the airfield between 29 April 1946 and 8 November 1946 with the Lancaster I and III.
- No. 281 Maintenance Unit.

=== Post war ===
- USAF 3114th Ammo Supply Squadron. Munitions storage and refurbishment. 1955–1959. Reestablished when the 8th Air Force returned to RAF Lakenheath. About 100 USAF airmen in refurbished barracks. A small RAF contingent for munitions disposal. Bombs in runways marked with large X. Small arms stored in hangars.
- No. 107 Squadron RAF – PGM-17 Thor nuclear missiles.

== Current use ==
The site is now used for farming and Gunman Airsoft.

== See also ==
- List of former Royal Air Force stations
