= Royal Air Force Special Duties Service =

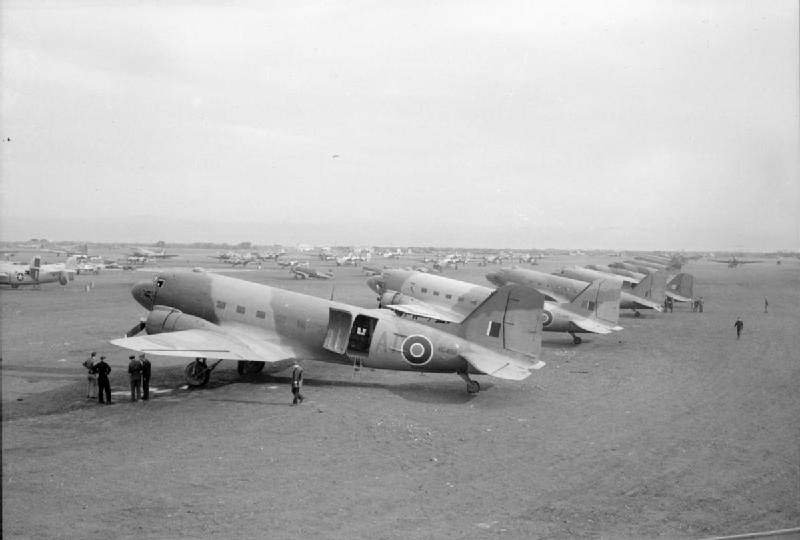
- SD Dakotas in Italy
- Active: 21 August 1940 – 30 August 1945
- Country: United Kingdom
- Allegiance: Allies
- Branch: Royal Air Force
- Role: Air transport and supply support for resistance movements in the occupied territories.

The Royal Air Force Special Duties (SD) Service was a secret air service created to provide air transport to support the resistance movement in Axis controlled territories. The service helped develop and support the resistance by bringing in agents, wireless operators and supplies. Parachute drop was the primary method by which the Special Duties units delivered supplies and most of the agents to the occupied countries. They also developed an air taxi service to pick up agents, political leaders and special communications from occupied Europe and bring them to England. On the outward flight the air taxi service also delivered agents and high value packages to France. Special Duties flights flew to target fields in Vichy France, Occupied France, Belgium, Netherlands, Norway, Poland, Czechoslovakia, Yugoslavia, and Greece. By the end of the war Special Duties units were also operating in the Far East. The air units were controlled by the Royal Air Force, and worked closely with the SOE and the SIS.

== Formation ==
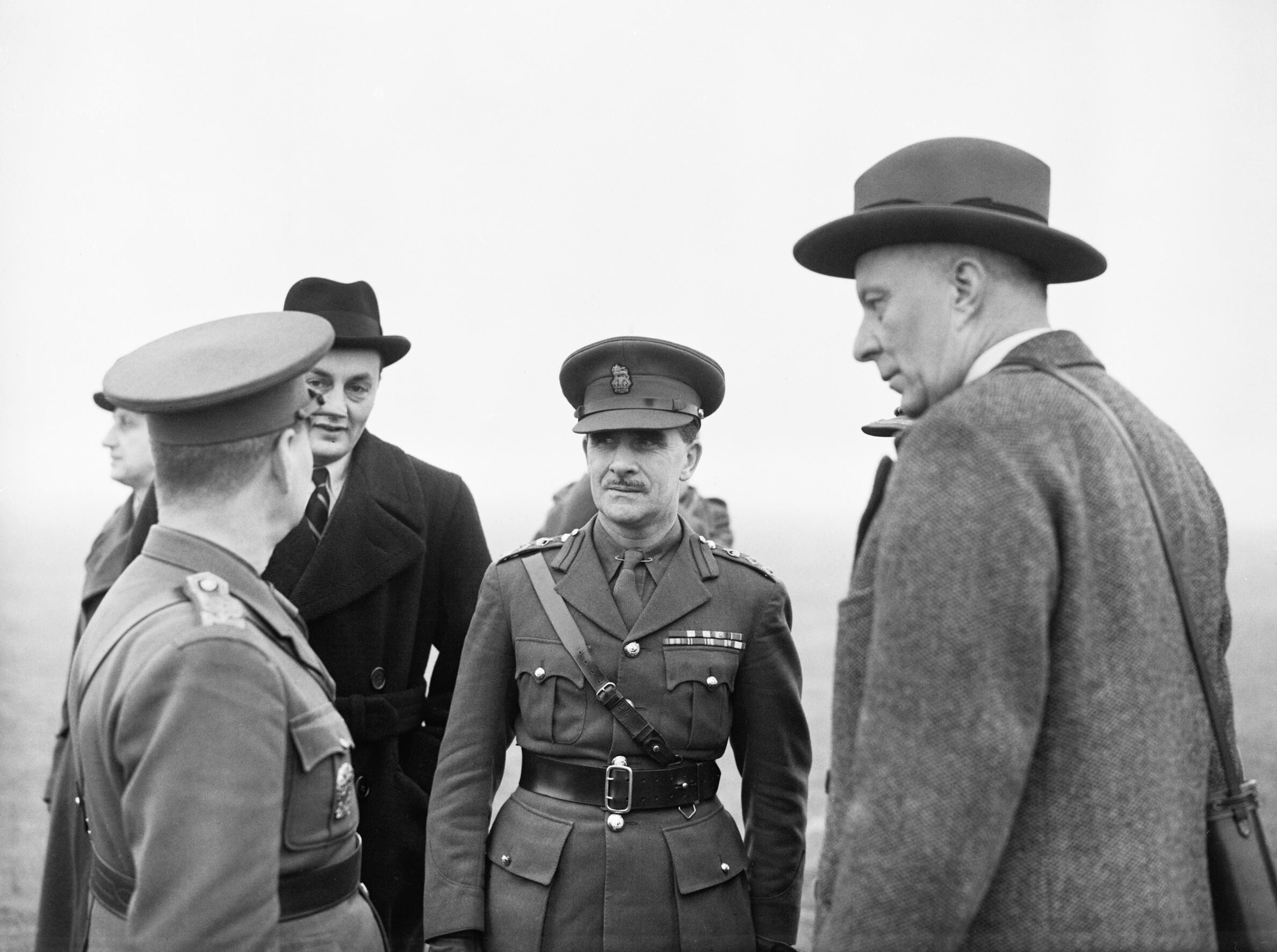
Hugh Dalton, right, Minister of Economic Warfare, and Colin Gubbins, chief of SOE, talking to a Czech officer during a visit to Czech troops near Leamington Spa, Warwickshire

After the end of the Battle of France in June 1940, the Prime Minister, Winston Churchill, advocated the development of a resistance movement in Europe. His aim was two-fold: to develop a spirit of resistance in the Nazi occupied countries, and to develop a fifth column of resistance fighters who would be able to assist in the liberation of their countries when the British returned. To support these aims a method of communication and supply to the resistance needed to be developed. To this purpose a highly secret organisation separate from MI6 was formed which had no official existence. Formed on 22 July 1940 under Hugh Dalton, the Minister of Economic Warfare, it was called the Special Operations Executive (SOE). Known only among the highest levels of the cabinet, extensive efforts were taken to keep its existence secret. The SOE cloaked itself by interacting with other agencies under seemingly unrelated names. Traditional armed service organisations might deal with the Inter-Services Research Bureau, the Joint Technical Board, or the Special Training Schools Headquarters. At the Admiralty the naval service dealt with the NID (Q), at the War Office the MO I(SP), while at the Air Ministry the operative entity was known as the AI IO. Most never gained an insight that these entities were the same organisation, nor did they penetrate the nature and extent of it

To support the movement forming in Europe a clandestine air service was necessary. Foreign Office officials approached the Air Ministry to ask if agents could be parachuted or flown into France and the Low Countries. They received a frosty reception. Air marshal Charles Portal, commander-in-chief of RAF Bomber Command, baulked at using aircraft just to ferry spies. His Air vice-marshal, Arthur Harris, did not want to divert aircraft and pilots needed elsewhere "to carry ragamuffins to distant spots". Others, notably Churchill, disagreed. The SOE got its support and the Special Duties service units were created. Harris was told by the Air Ministry to provide the air services support, which he did, though he continued to argue that it was taking resources away from the main task.

The air units created and the missions they were performing were kept secret. This sometimes proved a challenge. In one instance in 1942 poor weather resulted in a Whitley flight having to return without dropping its agents. On the return trip the plane crashed along the English coast, killing all aboard. Among the dead were five SOE agents dressed as civilians. It was explained to the public that they were members of the press along to observe the results of a bombing raid. When a local newspaper pressed further, asking why so many press members were aboard the flight, the Army Special Investigation Branch made a visit to the paper and the story was suppressed. Said a pilot after the war: "Even when high ranking officers who were not in the know asked about the work we were doing we had to lie like old Harry. It was court martial if we breathed a word about the job. Not even the mechanics knew about the passenger flights". For the special duties aircrews, who they were and what they did remained a secret until the war had been over for over 30 years.

Initially a flight of aircraft was formed on 21 August 1940 by 11 Group Fighter Command and set aside to support the effort. Control was transferred to 3 Group on 2 October 1940. The needs of the SOE grew, as did those of the air units supporting them. Eventually two "Special Duties" squadrons were created by the RAF as a link with the underground movements in the occupied countries. A third was added in 1943 to work in the Mediterranean theater. In the last year of the war a fourth was added for the Far East. The squadrons worked in support of SOE and the SIS, though with SOE organising, arming and supplying a civilian army, it required the lion's share of the air transport services. The peak effort was reached just around the time of the Allied invasion of occupied Europe in June 1944.

== Training ==
The first task of the RAF was to deliver agents to France trained in the selection of fields suitable for their aircraft to land and take off again. These agents had to be fluent in French to blend in. Once the agent was in place and had selected a number of potential locations for landings he was ready to receive an operation.

=== Operator training ===
French nationals trained as agents were presented to the RAF to be specially trained as 'operators', known in French as the chef de terrain. Training initially was done at 'F' section in London at Tempsford's Station 61, the so-called "Joe School." The training was completed at RAF Tempsford, with the aid of the special duties pilots from 161 Squadron. This was done during the dark of the moon, the pilot's off periods. Commented one pilot after the war: "We had to have decent fields, so we brought back men of the resistance movement to teach them the sort of places to select and what to do to help us to land." The operators learned what to look for in selecting a field: a clear path without trees or telephone wires, with at least 600 yards of clearing. The ground had to be firm. They were to avoid mud at all costs.

The agents trained were either of French heritage, were French expatriates living in exile in England, or were resistance members picked up from France and brought back to England for training. Some of them had been pilots in the French Armée de l'Air. Agents were trained at the false airfield at "RAF Somersham" in signaling aircraft in Morse code and in laying out a flare path. Supply drop flare paths were made with 5 flashlights forming an "X". For a Lysander landing the skeleton flare path was made with 3 flashlights that formed an inverted "L".

To avoid problems the RAF strongly preferred to land on fields handled by operators they had trained. If an operator started to pick out less than desirable landing fields he would be recalled to Tempsford for remedial training. Following a mission in April 1942 that almost resulted in an aircraft and pilot being lost on a boggy field the RAF insisted they would only land aircraft on fields handled by an operator that 161 Squadron had trained. If the agent failed the training he would not be allowed to manage landings. Operators who passed their training were said to be qualified to "lay on an operation".

=== Pilot training ===
The special duties squadrons had to recruit and train pilots for their command. Being a secret organisation, recruitment was a problem. Some pilots were drawn to the SD squadrons by personal contacts, others by the pilot's own experience in escaping from the continent. All of them had an "Above Average" pilot rating. Many had also qualified as navigators. Self-reliance in navigation was an important quality for the SD pilots. Many judged it a more essential skill for a successful SD pilot than piloting the aircraft itself. A pilot had to fly in the dark of night over enemy occupied territory, frequently in weather that grounded other squadrons, and navigate by himself to a small dark field in the middle of France. Pilots had to be self-reliant, capable of thinking and acting on their own. Hugh Verity wrote a set of instructions for the Lysander pilots in A Flight of 161 Squadron. These were guides offered from an experienced Lysander pilot to the novitiate, but were more helpful tips rather than a set of hard fast rules. 161 Squadron did not have rigid rules they followed, as conditions and obstacles such as bad weather, low cloud and fog, boggy landing fields, or possible enemy action were too variable. As 161 Squadron commander Charles Pickard often remarked: "There's always bloody something!"

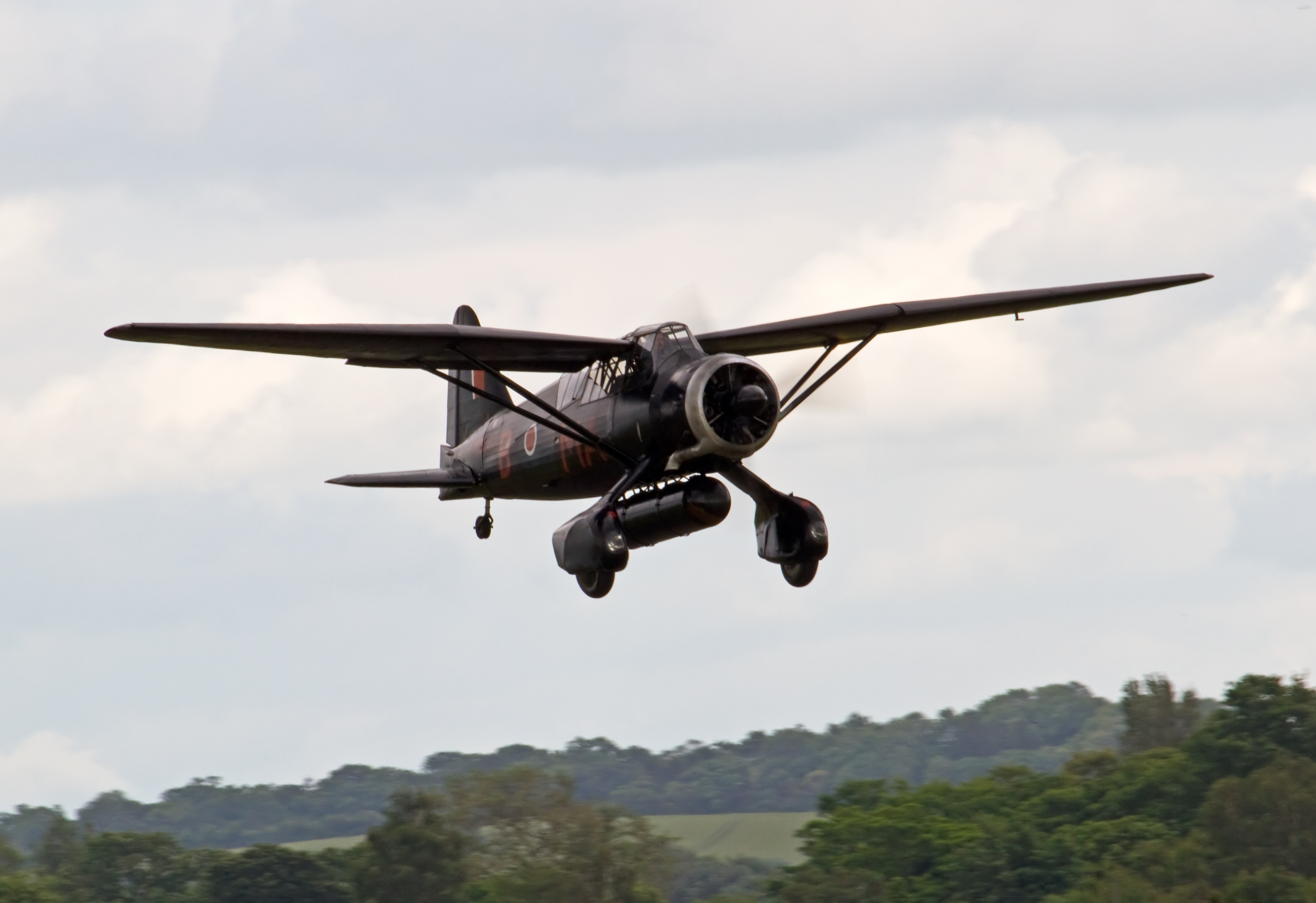
A low flying SD modified Lysander over England

It took about a month for a pilot to complete the training and for the commanding officer to determine if the pilot would be able to do the job. Training required the pilot to be extremely comfortable with the layout of the aircraft's controls. He had to learn how to work out a course to his target and back. The course set was made up of a string of pinpoints, navigational terrain features which were identifiable and whose location was sure. The course was a 50 mi (80 km)-wide corridor designed to avoid German flak emplacements. On his trip the pilot flew from pinpoint to pinpoint, staying in the corridor until he reached the target area. He would practice this by flying by navigation alone over England by day, without making use of the radio to ask for a homing bearing, flying from navigation point to navigation point. The flights would be repeated at night. Next they practised night time landings and take-offs from a grass field. This training was done at "RAF Somersham", a "dummy" airfield near RAF Tempsford initially used as a decoy during the Blitz. It was later put to use by the RAF and the SOE for training of agent operators and Lysander pilots, as the rough field approximated a typical landing ground in occupied France.

The final test for a Lysander pilot was to fly across occupied France through a corridor free of flak to a pinpoint target south of Saumur. The pilot had been told only to look for a light. On arrival, he found a brightly lit rectangle: a prison camp whose illuminated perimeter wire stood out as an unusually distinct landmark. After returning and reporting that he had reached the target, he was declared operational.

== Operations ==
=== Parachute drops of supplies ===
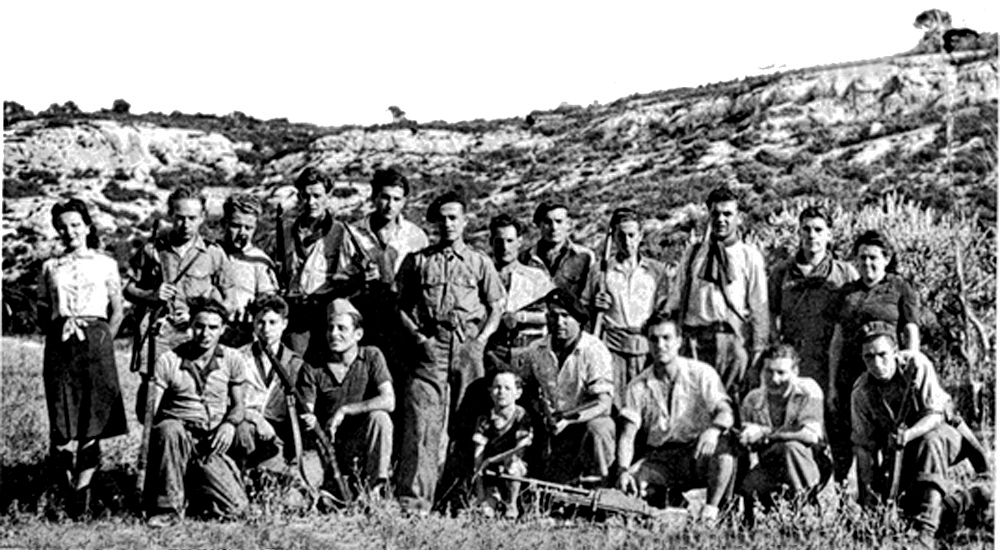
Jean Garcin and some of his maquis resistance fighters in 1944

Supply delivery was the primary undertaking of the Special Duties squadrons. To support the burgeoning resistance forces a great deal of material was needed, and the needs increased as numbers in the resistance increased. In May 1941 an Air Ministry staff officer estimated that to supply 45,000 resistance fighters in the field would require 2,000 sorties a year. Supplies delivered included arms, ammunition, plastic explosives, radio sets, bicycles for transportation, bicycle tires, food, clothing and medical supplies. Specialty supplies included radio crystals, printer's ink, and for the Norwegians, skis and sleds.

The bulk of supplies to the resistance in France were transported to them by 138 Squadron, with the B Flight of 161 Squadron doing agent and supply drops as well. Both squadrons depended on moonlight for visibility over the landing fields and drop zones. To receive the supplies the operator on the ground would wait at a designated field. When the aircraft was heard overhead the operator would flash a prearranged Morse code letter. The supply aircraft would flash a corresponding letter using its "downward identification light". The team on the ground would light the field, using five lights placed in an "X" pattern to mark the drop target. The aircraft came over the field at very low altitude, 400 to 500 feet, and reduced speed to just above stalling to minimize scatter and damage to the cargo. The operator would have arranged means to move the supplies off to places of concealment.

Stores were usually parachuted in using cylindrical containers to protect the loads. C-type metal containers were 6 feet long and could weigh up to 250 pounds. This container could be used to carry longer loads such as rifles. The "H" type had been developed by the Poles. It was the same size overall, but could be broken down into five smaller sections to make it easier to carry away and conceal. Packages delivered, on the other hand, seldom weighed more than 100 pounds. Some materials such as boots and blankets were "free-dropped" by simply throwing them bundled together out of the aircraft, often to the hazard of any receiving committee on the ground. 20% of the drop missions were aborted, either because the reception committee was not there or the weather was too poor to find the drop field. High value items, such as forged documents and money, were often transported in with an agent, often by Lysander.

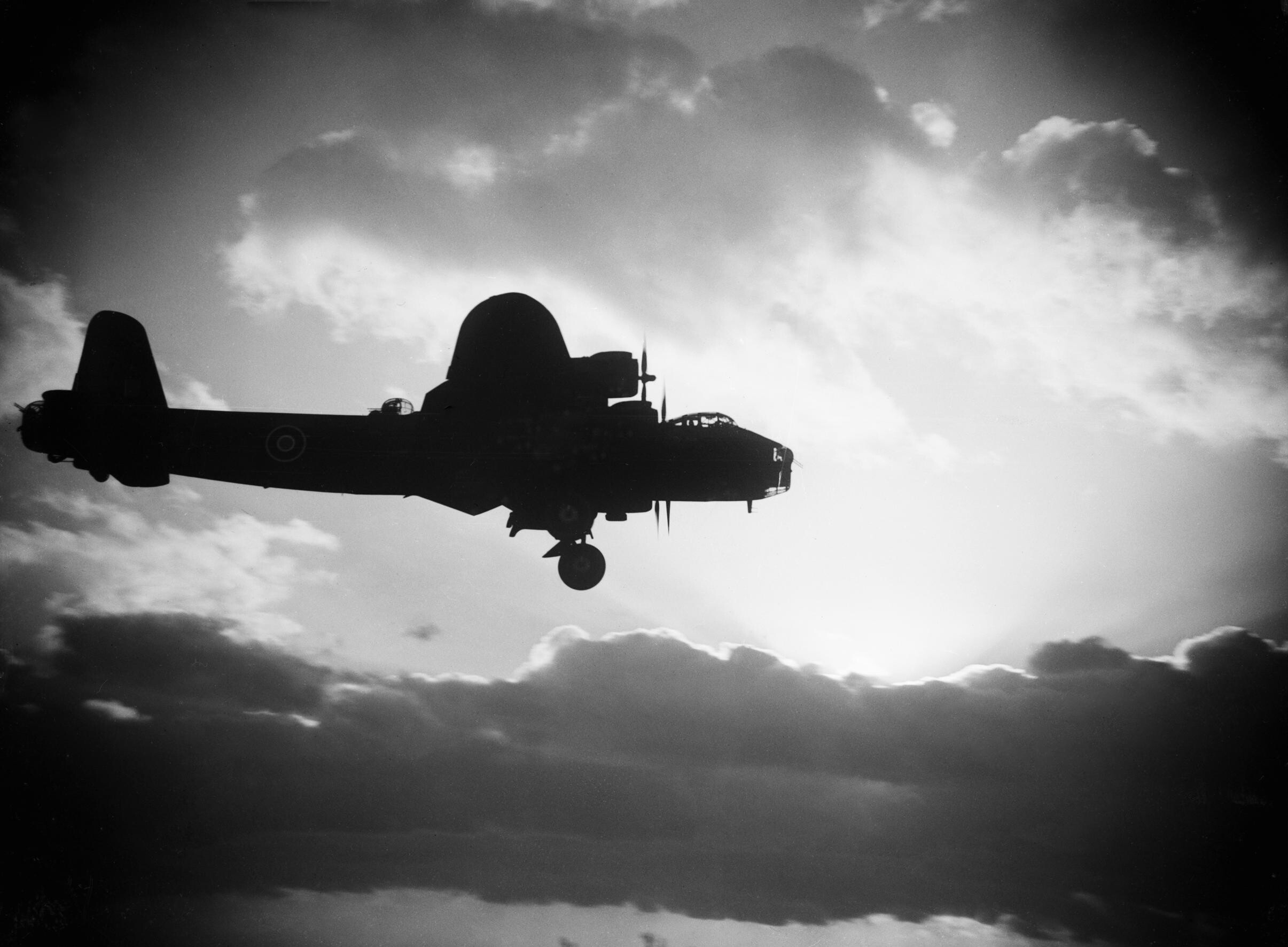
A Stirling at dusk, December 1943

Harris did not approve of the use of aircraft for these purposes, and in particular complained that they did nothing for 2 weeks at a time during the dark period. This was not entirely true, as the long flights of their operations had a high maintenance requirement, and they did perform training work. Nevertheless, it seemed prudent to assist, and during the dark period some of 138s aircraft contributed in the bombing campaign over Germany. With target drop zones as far away as Poland and Yugoslavia, the missions flown tended to expose the crews to a great deal of time over enemy occupied territory. Due to this their first tour was completed with 250 hours of operational flight, if that were accumulated before the 30 sorties that was the normal for marking the completion of a first tour for Bomber Command crews. The needs for supplies increased as the circuits being supported grew larger and the time of the invasion approached. 138 Squadron's lift capacity was improved with the loan of Short Stirling bombers in December 1943. The loan became permanent in 1944 when the Stirlings were retired from Bomber Command and 138 Squadron converted from Halifaxes to Stirlings.

=== Parachute drops of agents ===
The majority of agents arrived in France by parachute drop. This was not a gentle daytime float from altitude. They were dropped at night over a reception field at 500–600 ft (150–180 m), just high enough for the parachute to open a few seconds before the agent hit the ground. Some 1,500 agents were dropped into France, and many of these did several drops. The aircrews generically called the agents "Joes" and for the most part did not get to know them. If the aircraft was a little too low it made for a rough landing, and a number of agents were injured. Over the course of the war six agents were killed from failed drops, the result of either the aircraft being too low or the chute failing to open. Agent drop operations almost always went off during the moon period, though occasionally "blind drops" were completed to empty fields in the dark period. Said 161 Squadron's B Flight commander Bob Hodges

We sometimes dropped agents in the dark period with no moon, and these were often what we call blind drops. There was no reception committee on the ground and this method had security advantages, but there was always the risk of injury in the parachute landings.

=== Pick-up flights ===
The Occupied Zone and Free Zone of France, 1940-1942

Pick-up operations were initially handled by the Lysander flight in 138 Squadron. After the split to form 161 Squadron the pick-ups were handled by 161's A Flight. Each planned pick-up operation was given an operational name, and the name was used until the mission had been completed. If the pick-up failed on the first attempt due to weather, subsequent efforts to make the same pick-up were put on under the same operational name. By 1942 a routine had developed for putting together an operation. A resistance group would request a pick-up, choose a landing ground and provide a detailed description and map reference to London. The field would be photographed by the RAF's Photographic Reconnaissance Unit to allow the pilot to study the appearance of the proposed field. The pilot would then make up a route map to the target field by cutting a map of France into small folding sections that could be easily held in the pilot's hand. The route chosen was made up of a series of navigation pinpoints. The best navigational pinpoints were bodies of water, such as lakes, bends in a river, and so forth. Water reflected silver in the moonlight against the dark gray of the land, and made for the easiest terrain features to identify. (Note: Verity offers this advice in his Pilot Instructions.)

During the flight the pilot would hold his folding map in one hand and the stick in the other. Over the course of the trip the pilot could ensure his progress by going folded section by section, point by point. The river Loire was a frequent guide. At a point along its course just east of Blois the river takes a sharp bend and two small islands are present. This easily identifiable terrain feature became a primary navigational pinpoint for operations deep into France. Upon leaving England a pilot would drop down to 500 ft (150 m) over the channel to get under German radar. Crossing the French coastline was one of the more dangerous aspects of the trip, as German forces and anti-aircraft guns were present over much of the coastline opposite England. Cabourg was the favored spot to cross into the continent, as it avoided heavy anti-aircraft guns to the northeast at Le Havre and German army forces to the southwest at Caen. From Tangmere to Cabourg was about an hour's flight in a Lysander. Flying the single engine airplane over the cold waters of the English Channel at night was a test itself. Mechanical failure and a forced ditching in the sea was unlikely to end well. The ground crews knew this, and their Lysanders never suffered an engine failure. As the pilot approached the French coastline he would climb to 8,000 ft (2,400 m) to get above the light flak found there, then drop down to 2,000 to 1,500 ft (610 to 460 m) while flying across France for ease in reading the landmarks. If the sky was clear some pilots preferred to transit at 7,000 to 8,000 ft (2,100 to 2,400 m) to avoid flak and conserve fuel, but the locations of flak were known, so this was less an issue after the coastline had been crossed. Once across the French coast the pilot would hold his map on his knee and fly the aircraft with his other hand, checking off his pinpoints as he moved inland. When the pilot got close to the target there would be a near pinpoint. Identifying it, he could make a calculation based on course direction and time of flight for when he would be over the field. As the aircraft approached, the field agent laying on the operation would signal a prearranged code letter in Morse.

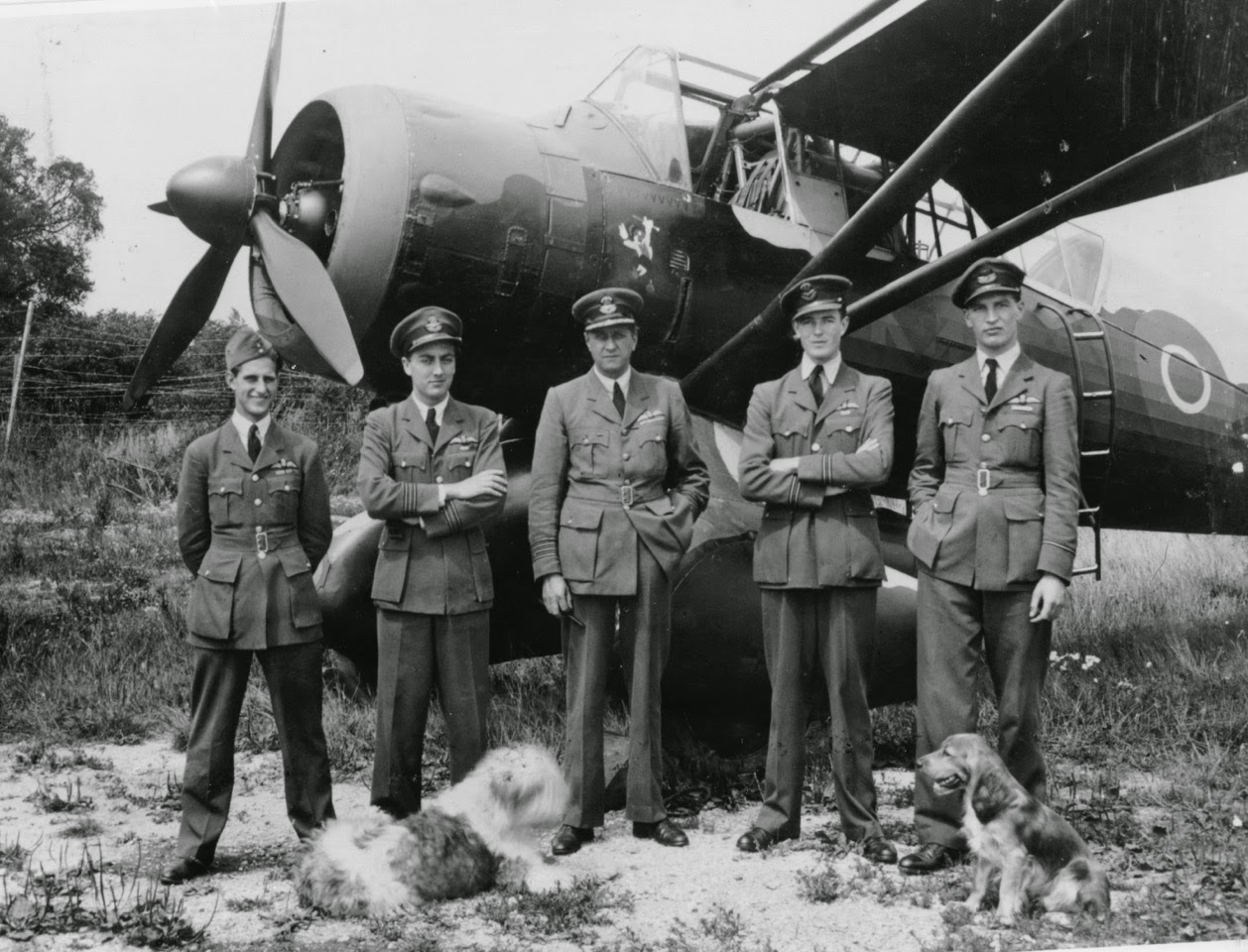
A group of 161 pilots stand before Verity's Lysander in 1943 (Jimmy McCairns, Hugh Verity, Charles Pickard, Peter Vaughan-Fowler, and Bunny Rymills)

Operating his signal key, the pilot would flash back the agreed to Morse letter response via the plane's downward light. With the correct exchange of signals the operator and his men would light the flare path. The flare path was simply three flashlights staked out to poles. The operator and waiting passengers would be to the left of the "A" lamp at the base of the landing ground; 160 yd (150 m) beyond it and into the wind was the "B" light. 50 m (55 yd) to the right of the "B" lamp was the "C" lamp. The three lights formed an inverted "L". With the correct code letters exchanged the pilot would fly a circuit over the field and then bring the aircraft down to land. The Lysander's landing lights would be switched on just before landing so the pilot might be able to see obstructions. The pilot tried to touch down at the “A” lamp, and by applying hard brake usually had the aircraft stopped by the time it reached the B lamp. He would turn around at the "C" lamp, and then taxi back to the "A" lamp for the exchange. The incoming passengers would clamber down the fixed ladder to the ground. The last passenger to disembark would hand off the luggage and take aboard the outgoing luggage before he climbed down the ladder himself. Then the outgoing passengers would climb aboard. The change over of passengers and load was completed in under three minutes. Often the operator would climb up to greet the pilot. There was a quick exchange of greetings and gifts, then full power with brake on until the tail lifted. With that it was off brake and airborne again in less than 150 yd (140 m).

Though a brazenly bold undertaking, on occasion landings were made at abandoned French aerodromes that the Germans were not making use of. (Note: McCairns flew to an unused aerodrome to make a pick-up. Whippy Nesbitt-Dufort made an attempt at one but had to call it off. One mission was flown to "a deserted airfield near Thalamy". Pickard flew his last Hudson mission to a deserted Florac aerodrome (southern France) on 18 April 1943. Fielden returned there in a Hudson in May 1943.) The Lysander pilots faced a number of dangers, including flak, German night fighters, Allied night fighters, the Gestapo, poor weather and mud. Of these, the most dangerous were poor weather and mud caked fields. German flak was concentrated along the coast, over towns and over German operated airfields. However, these locations were known to the pilots, so if a pilot plotted his course carefully and did not stray from it while flying the mission he should be able to avoid most if not all flak. German night fighters posed a threat, and there were interceptions. The night fighters were concentrated to the north over Belgium and in Germany, and presented a threat more to Halifax pilots flying to Poland then to Lysander pilots flying to Vichy France. A number of pilots and their passengers were lost in this way. In the early years Gestapo efforts to capture the fliers resulted a number of close calls. Being caught on the ground and subjected to interrogations by the Gestapo was always on the minds of the pilots as they orbited over a field and touched down. If an aircraft became stuck the plane had to be destroyed, and the pilot had to look for other means to get home. Usually this meant a long trek through the escape lines to southern France, over the Pyrenees and into Spain with hopes of reaching the British consulate and a flight home. When Robin Hooper's Lysander became trapped in mud in mid-November 1943, a Lysander recovery flight was launched during the next moon period to pick him up. This was carried out on 17 December 1943 by Squadron Leader Bob Hodges. Hodges knew the forecast over England for the night was poor, and purposed an early flight to get back and down before the home airfields became shrouded in fog. An hour later thick ground fog resulted in the loss of two Lysanders and three Halifaxes in the worst night of losses in the history of the Special Duties squadrons.

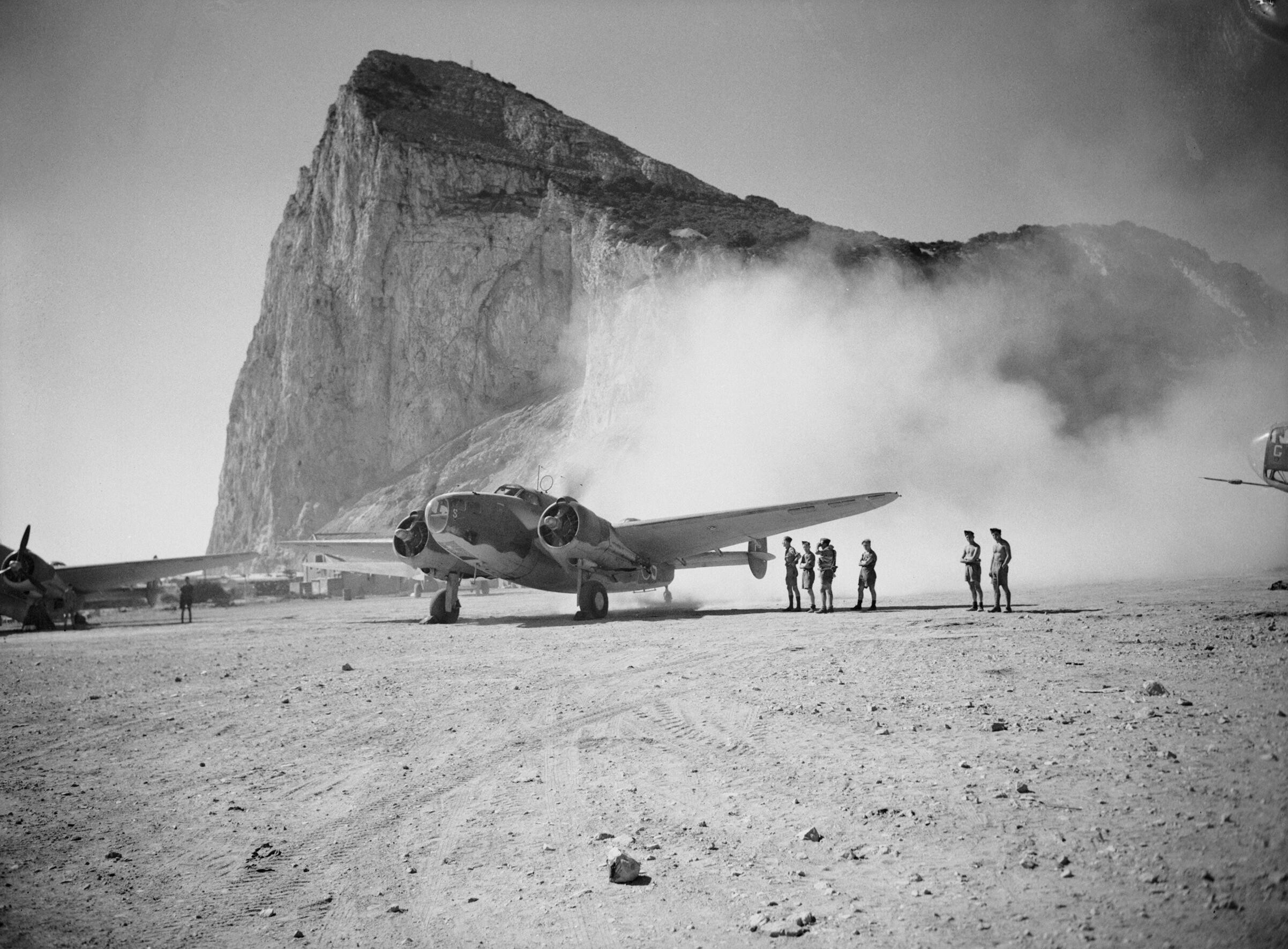
A Hudson at Gibraltar

To minimize the risk of capture while the plane was on the ground the job of dis-embarking and boarding passengers was choreographed and practised, so that the time the Lysander was on the ground was kept to a minimum. The goal was to complete turnover in 3 minutes. Most pilots flew with a pistol as a personal sidearm, though the pistol was rarely put to use. Pilots also carried an escape kit, in case. The worst fear of the pilots was a muddy field that would cause their aircraft to become stuck, trapping them on the ground in occupied France. This occurred to pilots a number of times. Their options were to try to get their aircraft unstuck, or to burn the plane and try to escape out of France on foot. Freeing up a plane stuck on the ground was a battle against time, for the pilot needed to get up in the air and out of France before daylight and the inevitable Luftwaffe morning patrols. If the flight was delayed too long an alternative route home was worked out by RAF Tempsford's CO, Mouse Fielden, who when he found himself delayed in the south of France took his Hudson out over the Mediterranean to the British airfield in Algiers at Maison Blanche. From there on the next day he flew to Gibraltar and then back to England.

Flights at night to make pick-ups have largely been viewed as the more glamorous duty of the Special Duties squadrons, though at the time the pilots were rarely acknowledged publicly. The Lysanders they flew had been relegated to towing targets for firing practice or performing scouting flights as part of air/sea rescue operations. Thus if a pilot was seen by a fellow aviator climbing into a Lysander they tended to get a look of slight regard. Clearly they did not appear to be on the sharp end of the war effort. Regardless of public snubbing, morale among Lysander pilots was high, and they had a great deal of satisfaction for pulling agents out of Europe right under the nose of the Gestapo. After the D-Day landings in June 1944 the favored entry point was changed from Cabourg to south of the Cotentin Peninsula to avoid Allied anti-aircraft fire and night fighters. Poor weather of either cloud or fog were the most prominent reasons for failing to complete a mission. The pilot might carry on and attempt to reach the objective, calculating his position from a last known navigational point. Using the aircraft's speed, time and direction, he might estimate when he would be over the general area of the target field by dead reckoning. However he would still need a break over the target field in order to see the reception committee light and the flare path for the landing.

== Formations ==
=== Flight 419 and Flight 1419 ===
The first RAF special duties formation was Flight 419, officially formed 21 August 1940 and operating out of the fighter base at RAF North Weald. Flight Lt. Wallace Farley was the commanding officer of the flight, which comprised two Lysanders. Prior to Flight Lt. Wallace and immediately before the Flight was officially formed Acting Flight Lt John Coghlan was appointed to command it. He was lost whilst flying an agent into Belgium on the night of the 17/18 August and he was then replaced by Flight Lt Wallace three days later. The first commander of this, as yet, unnamed flight was John Coghlan. By September three Whitleys and another Lysander had been added to the flight. While Flight 419 was working up the first clandestine flight was flown by Wing Commander Andrew Geddes, who took an SIS agent to a field near Tours France on the night of 3 September 1940, flying a Lysander. This Lysander was part of an Army Cooperation unit.

==== First mission ====
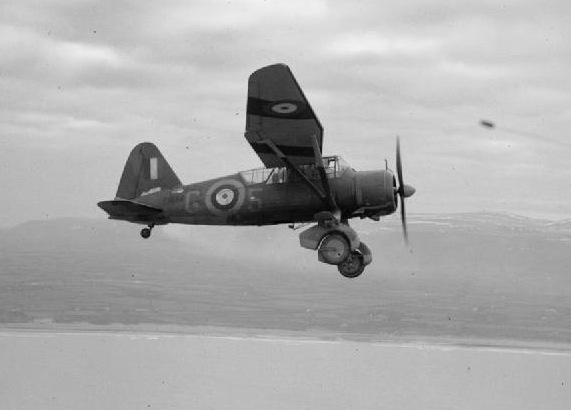
An early Lysander in flight

Flight 419's first mission was undertaken the night of 19/20 October 1940 when Flight Lt. Farley set out to pick-up SIS agent Philip Schneidau. Schneidau had parachuted into France ten days earlier on the night of October 9. Before he left Schneidau and Farley had worked out how he would be retrieved. As no small wireless sets were available at that time, he had brought along 10 messenger pigeons as the means to communicate back to England. The two had worked out a 3 light flare path pattern to guide the Lysander on its landing. The simple flare path remained in use for Lysander landings without modification throughout the rest of the war. Schneidau had also made a number of modifications to the Lysander, including the welding of a ladder to the side of the fuselage to make it easier for him to climb in, which was helpful, and the removal of the aircraft's rear canopy for the same reason, which was not. The plan was for Schneidau to be retrieved on the night of the 19th.

On the night of his planned pick-up, heavy wind and rain resulted in all RAF operations being cancelled. Knowing Schneidau would be waiting for him, Farley convinced his CO to let him give it a try. Though taking off in a storm, the weather cleared some over France. Farley located Schneidau's field, landed and made the pick-up. On the way out a German sentry put a bullet into Farley's airplane, which entered the cockpit, passed between Farley's legs and struck the compass, destroying it.

As the two men began their flight back the storm worked up into a southwesterly gale, pushing them north and east. With rain and wind pouring into the open rear cockpit, the wireless set became inoperable. Schneidau was soon soaked through and became increasingly cold. Making their way north through the storm, the two had no reference points to guide them. They soon had no idea if they had made it over England, were still over the North Sea or had been blown back over northern Germany. The pair flew on through the night, hoping for a break in the sky. Six hours later they were running out of fuel, still with no idea of where they were. At last a break in the cloud gave them a glimpse of a small plateau at the top of the steep cliffs of a rugged coastline. With no other option available, they dropped down to make a landing and crashed through a number of anti-glider posts. They had crashed six miles north of RAF Oban in Scotland, 600 miles north of Farley's home airfield.

The two men were spotted by a pair of Scottish guardsmen, whose English they could not understand. They were brought in to the senior officer at the RAF coastal command base at Oban as suspected spies. The station commander inquired who they were and what they were doing there. Farley limited his answer to his name and service number. Schneidau said they had been doing a special recce over the Atlantic, but he was unable to give his name. Finding these answers entirely unsatisfactory, the base commander confined them. Meanwhile, Farley's commanding officer had been searching for them, looking for signs of a wreck along the cliffs of the coast of England. He was informed that a Lysander had crashed in northern Scotland, but dismissed the wreck as being too far away. When he was told the pilot's name was Farley, he realized his man had made it back. Thus began the covert activities of the RAF Special Duties squadrons.

==== Administration ====
The special duties service required its own administrative support. Ordinary administrative procedures useful in the arming and targeting of large numbers of aircraft for bombing raids as practised by the RAF were unsuitable for the work of secretly moving agents, arms, supplies and special funds by solitary flights to isolated fields in France. The formation was initially under the administrative control of No. 11 Group RAF. In September 419 Flight was bombed out of North Weald and moved to Stradishall. Administrative control switched to 3 Group, which provided administrative support to all Special Duties squadrons until the end of the war. Two Whitleys were added to the flight in September. Many of the early Whitley missions were flown to Poland. In February 1941 Flight 419 had its designation changed to No. 1419 Flight RAF to eliminate the confusion that had developed with No. 419 Squadron RAF. The flight was moved to Newmarket on 22 May 1941, and in September to Stapleford Tawney until October, when it was moved back to Stradishall.

=== No. 138 (Special Duties) Squadron ===
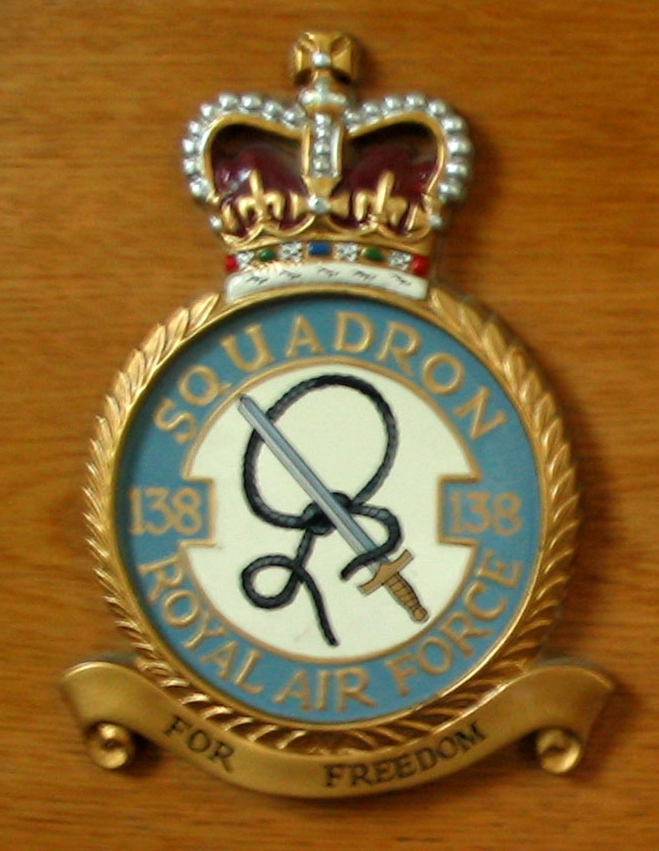
Insignia of 138 Squadron

On 25 August 1941 Flight 1419 was expanded with the addition of 5 Whitleys and became 138 (Special Duties) Squadron. Throughout the conflict 138 Squadron did the bulk of the heavy lifting of supplies and agents to France and the other occupied countries in Europe. The squadron comprised 2 Lysanders, 10 Whitleys, 3 Halifaxes and a Martin Maryland. The Squadron operated during the moon periods, flying to remote fields where they did their drops. They had no special navigational aides. The aircraft observed strict wireless silence over hostile territory, and reached their target fields by navigation alone. The aircraft flew over the continent at about 2,000 feet to navigate to the target field, but would drop down to 400 to 500 feet as the aircraft approached the drop point and reduced air speed to just above stalling to minimize scatter and damage to the cargo. The drops had to be accurate to ensure the waiting resistance agents would be able to get the materials dropped and hide them away.

Agents were dropped at 600 feet, barely enough time for the parachute to open and slow the fall of the agent. If the aircraft was a little too low it made for a very hard landing, and a number of agents were injured from hard landings. The Lysanders did the pick-up operations and made up their own B Flight in 138.

In February 1942 the squadron split, with its Lysanders and a number of its Whitleys and Halifaxes combining with the King's Flight to form 161 Squadron. After the split the majority of supply drops and agent drops were still handled by 138 Squadron. 161 Squadron did all of the pick-ups of personnel, and also would land agents who lacked the training to parachute in or were physically unable to do so. A month later, in March 1942, the squadron was moved to the secret airfield at Tempsford, where it remained until the end of the war. A number of Polish pilots operated in 138 Squadron. In July 1943 the Polish pilots in 138 were formed into their own unit, Flight 301.

By the end of the war 138 Squadron had flown more than 2,500 sorties, dropped 29,000 containers, 10,000 packages and 995 "Joes" into occupied Europe, while losing 70 aircraft. Over half of these missions were in Handley Page Halifax bombers, modified to provide a parachute hatch called the "Joe hole." As the war was coming to a close 138 Squadron was converted into a regular line unit on 9 March 1945. The squadron's insignia was of a sword cutting through a rope bind, with the motto "For Freedom".

=== No. 161 (Special Duties) Squadron ===
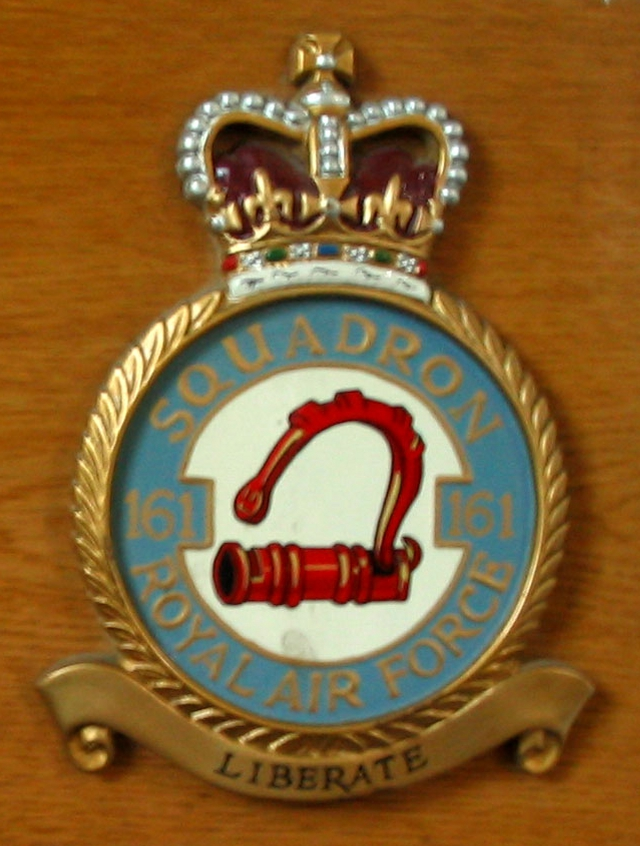
Insignia of 161 Squadron

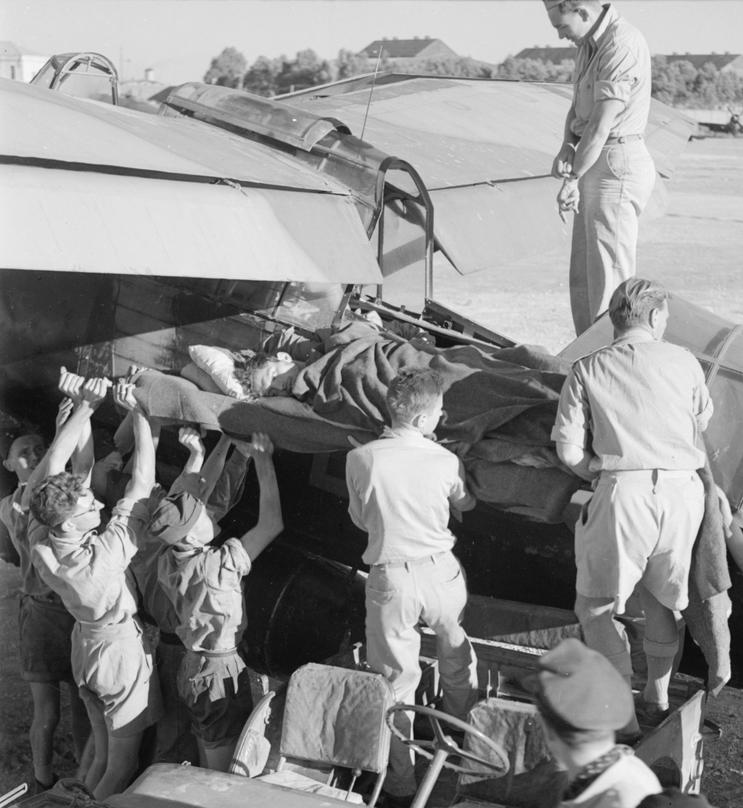
Captain John Giannaris, a Greek speaking US Army officer wounded leading a team of Greek resistance fighters, arrives from the field on a 148 (SD) Lysander. He survived.

161 (Special Duties) Squadron was formed at RAF Newmarket on 15 February 1942 from 138's Lysander flight and a flight of Whitleys and Wellingtons. These were combined with pilots and aircraft from the King's Flight to create the second SD squadron. The unit was commanded by Edward Fielden, an experienced pilot who had been the CO of the King's Flight. He inherited two very experienced officers in Guy Lockhart and “Sticky” Murphy from 138. 161's A Flight was made up of 6 Lysanders, with Guy Lockhart as its commanding officer. A Flight undertook the pick-up operations. The squadron's B Flight flew two-engine Whitleys and Wellingtons, and did agent parachute drops and supply drop missions. In November 1942 the B Flight's Whitleys were replaced with the four-engine Halifax.

The squadron moved to RAF Tempsford in April 1942, which remained its home base for the duration of the war. When on operations during the full moon period the A Flight would move forward to RAF Tangmere. Tangmere is on the coast, 100 miles south of Tempsford. The move extended the reach of A Flight's Lysanders into Europe. 161 Squadron would deliver SOE agents, wireless operators, wireless equipment and weapons to assist the resistance. Out of France they transported French political leaders, leaders of the resistance, and agents whose cover had been blown. Occasionally they gave a lift out to evading Allied airmen. They had the goal of making their pick-up operations as reliable as a London taxi service. The squadron also had the responsibility for operator training. Following a poorly directed and unnecessary pick-up in April 1942 the RAF insisted on tighter control of pick-up operations, and refused to perform pick-ups except with operators that 161's pilots had trained. The squadron's insignia was of a released shackle, with the motto "Liberate".

=== No. 148 (Special Duties) Squadron: Mediterranean ===
In 1943 a special duties squadron was created for operations in the Mediterranean. The unit was formed with the conversion of 148 Squadron to 148 (Special Duties) Squadron. The squadron was sent to Algiers to support an SOE unit, which was known as Interservice Signals Unit 6, codenamed 'Massingham'. The unit's Halifaxes dropped supplies to partisans in southern France, Italy and the Balkans. In February Peter Vaughan-Fowler was selected to command a flight of Lysanders to do agent pick-up operations to Greece, Yugoslavia and southern France. The unit participated in the Warsaw airlift, where it suffered heavy losses. 148 (SD) Squadron continued its work through the end of the war.

=== No. 357 (Special Duties) Squadron: Far East ===
In 1944 No. 357 (Special Duties) Squadron began operations in the Far East, flying Liberators, Dakotas, Lysanders and Catalina Flying Boats in support of SOE's Force 136 in Burma and other resistance groups in Thailand and Malaya. 357 (Special Duties) Squadron dropped more supplies by unit weight in the Far East than any other RAF unit dropped in weight of bombs.

== Airfields ==
=== RAF Tempsford ===
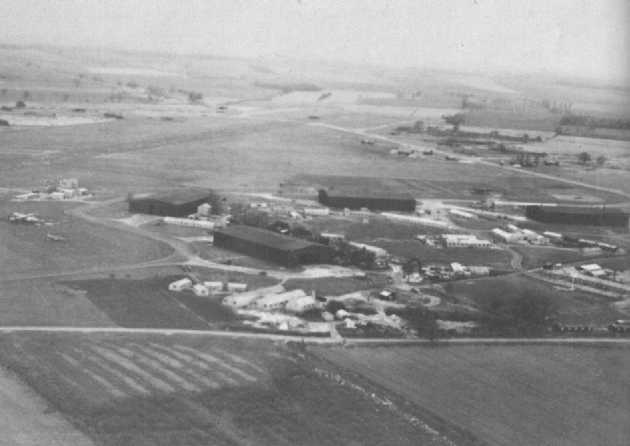
Hangars and temporary huts in the southeast corner of RAF Tempsford, 1943

Tempsford was in a relatively remote part of the Bedfordshire countryside. It was built on the land of the Gibraltar Farm, which was situated across a low bog. The airfield was developed in 1940 under the specifications of an "A" class airfield, though it was kept clandestine. The locals knew there was an RAF station down a little side-road marked “This road is closed to the public”, but they knew little else. Since the flights were all undertaken at night, the local farmers saw very little of the aircraft that operated out of Tempsford. Built over a bog, this became telling later when fog proved a recurring significant hazard to landing aircraft. The airfield lay largely dormant until the arrival of the SD squadrons in 1942. 138 Squadron moved to Tempsford 11 March 1942. 161 Squadron followed 10 April 1942. The first covert supply mission flown from Tempsford was carried out by 138 Squadron in the March moon period to a drop zone in northern France, 18 March 1942.

Underdeveloped, Tempsford was not a typical RAF airfield. It did have the standard three runways laid out at 60 degree angles to each other in a triangular pattern, and a perimeter track which circled the field's dispersals. Hugh Verity, the former commanding officer of 161 Squadron's A Flight, described it as "not much of an RAF station." RAF Tempsford was designed to look like an ordinary working farm. SOE agents were lodged in a local hotel before being brought to Tempsford's farm buildings. No one was allowed to see, let alone speak to, the agents being ferried to France. One of the buildings was brick built, but had wood siding framed around the structure to disguise it. This structure was commonly referred to as the Gibraltar Farm. It was very unusual for any structure to be standing within the perimeter track of an RAF airfield, but at Tempsford the Gibraltar Farm and a number of other farm buildings were located there. After final briefings and checks at the farm, the agents were issued firearms in the barn, and then boarded onto an awaiting aircraft flown by one of a team of pilots.

Though keen to discover the source of the SD flights, the Germans were never able to determine where the Special squadrons were based, though twice a German agent was picked up lurking about near the airfield.

=== RAF Tangmere ===
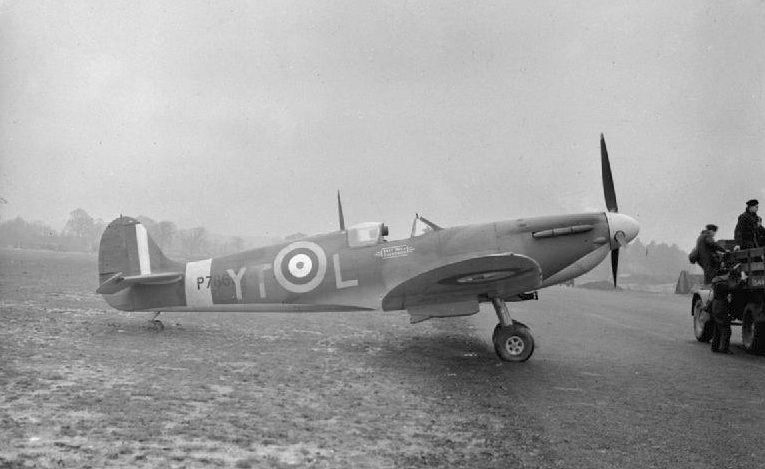
A Spitfire stands amidst the midday rain and fog of RAF Tangmere, winter 1940

RAF Tangmere was 100 miles south of RAF Tempsford, on the south coast of England. It was primarily a fighter squadron base, but during the moon periods the Lysanders and their ground crews would come down to Tangmere. This placed them closer to the target field and allowed the Lysanders to extend their range over France. For much of its wartime life two Spitfire squadrons were based at Tangmere. As such Tangmere airfield attracted the attention of the Luftwaffe. After Flight 419's second successful pick-up operation Gordon Scotter returned to Tangmere to find the airfield under attack. He was obliged to orbit about while the attack was in progress, and received the ire of the base commander when he brought his Lysander in without lights after the German attack was over.

When at Tangmere the Lysanders were parked off by themselves. The pilots were billeted and did their flight planning at a local home known as the Tangmere Cottage. The cottage was partially hidden from view by large hedges that had been allowed to grow up. Located opposite the main entrance to the base, Tangmere Cottage was also used by the SOE to do final checks on the outgoing agents, and to give returning agents a meal prior to taking them to London for debriefing. During the day the Lysander pilots would cross the field and take meals at the normal RAF officer's mess.

The 161 pilots would fly out to Tangmere two weeks at a time during the "moon period", which was a week before and a week after the full moon. The cover story for the Lysanders given to the RAF squadrons stationed at Tangmere was that the planes were used to do "photographic reconnaissance by night, using special flash flares". The torpedo like extra fuel cylinder slung in-between the wheels of the undercarriage was said to contain special nighttime cameras. Jimmy McCairns, a Lysander pilot with 161, had accepted this story without a thought earlier in his career when he was stationed at Tangmere while flying Spitfires with Douglas Bader's 601 Squadron.

Fog over England was a major hazard when attempting to locate and set down on their return flights. More special duties aircrew people died from aircraft accidents due to fog over England than to any other reason. On the night of 16/17 December 1943 poor weather caused five of the Tempsford SD aircraft to be lost. 138 Squadron lost three of its Halifaxes. One was lost over the sea, one crash landed along the coast, and the crew of the third, unable to land their plane, bailed out. On the same night fog claimed two of 161 Squadron's Lysanders. Though Lysander pilots had parachutes, the passengers they were carrying did not. If they were carrying passengers the pilots were committed to trying to land the aircraft. One crashed short of the field while trying to set down at RAF Tangmere. The pilot was trapped in the aircraft when it started to burn, but his two passengers were able to get free and survived. The other had been diverted from Tangmere to nearby RAF Ford, but the pilot had become disoriented in the fog and crashed into a hillside. There were no survivors from this flight.

== Aircraft ==
=== Armstrong Whitworth Whitley ===
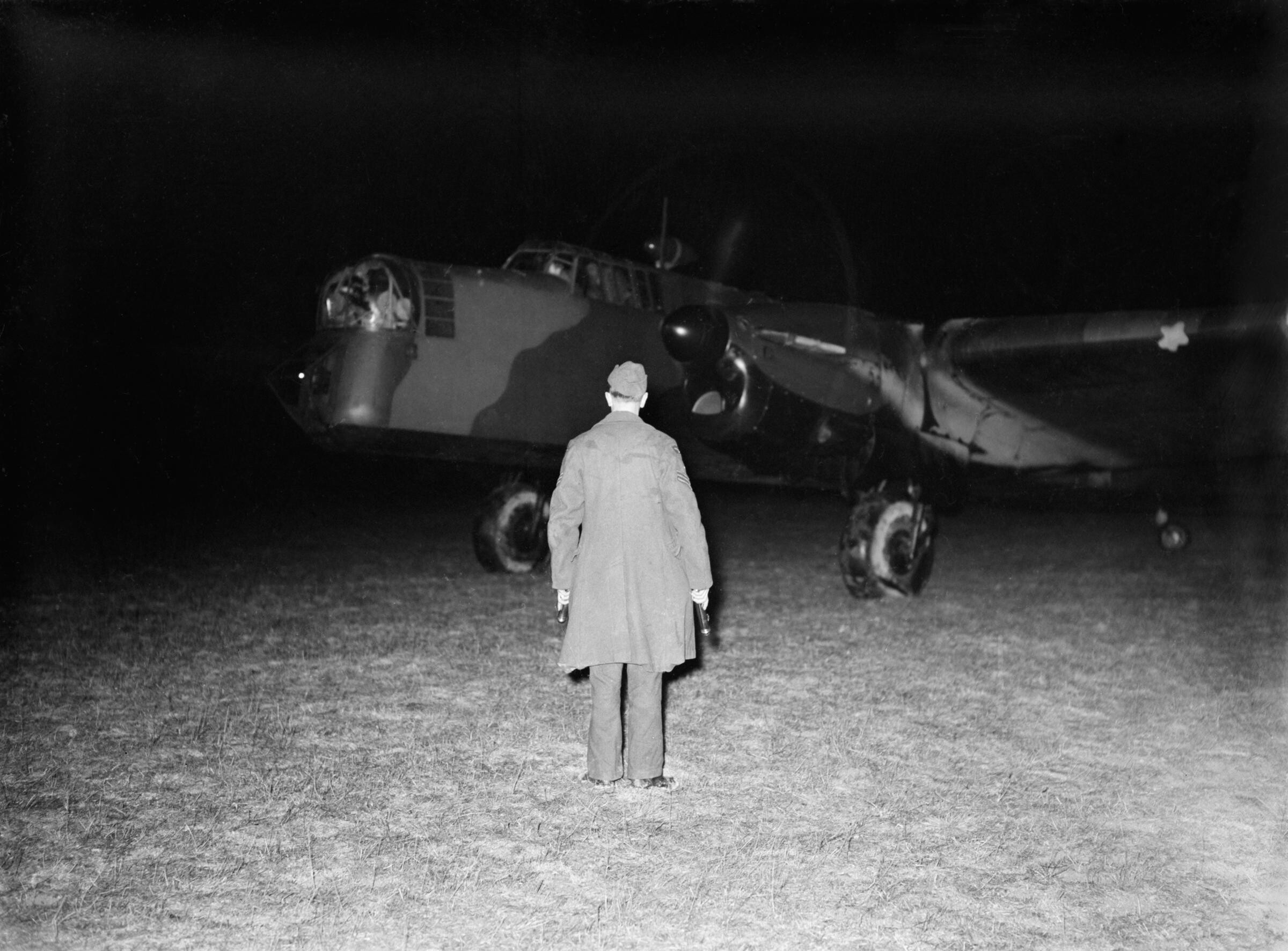
A Whitley warms its engines prior to a mission

The Whitley was the work horse aircraft used on special duties missions for the first two years of their operations. The two-engine bomber was introduced to the service in 1937. It had a crew of five and a lift capacity of 7,000 pounds. From its conception the Whitley was intended for night operations. For special duties work the aircraft was modified by having a drop hatch, or “Joe hole”, cut into the bottom of the fuselage to allow for easy disembarkation. The Whitley was famous for carrying the paratroopers who pulled off the Bruneval raid. Though an older design, over 1,000 Whitleys were produced after the start of the war. Whitleys were used as cargo carriers and agent drop aircraft in 138 Squadron and the B Flight of 161 Squadron. 138 Squadron operated the Whitley until November 1942 when they were replaced by the four-engined Halifax bomber.

=== Westland Lysander ===
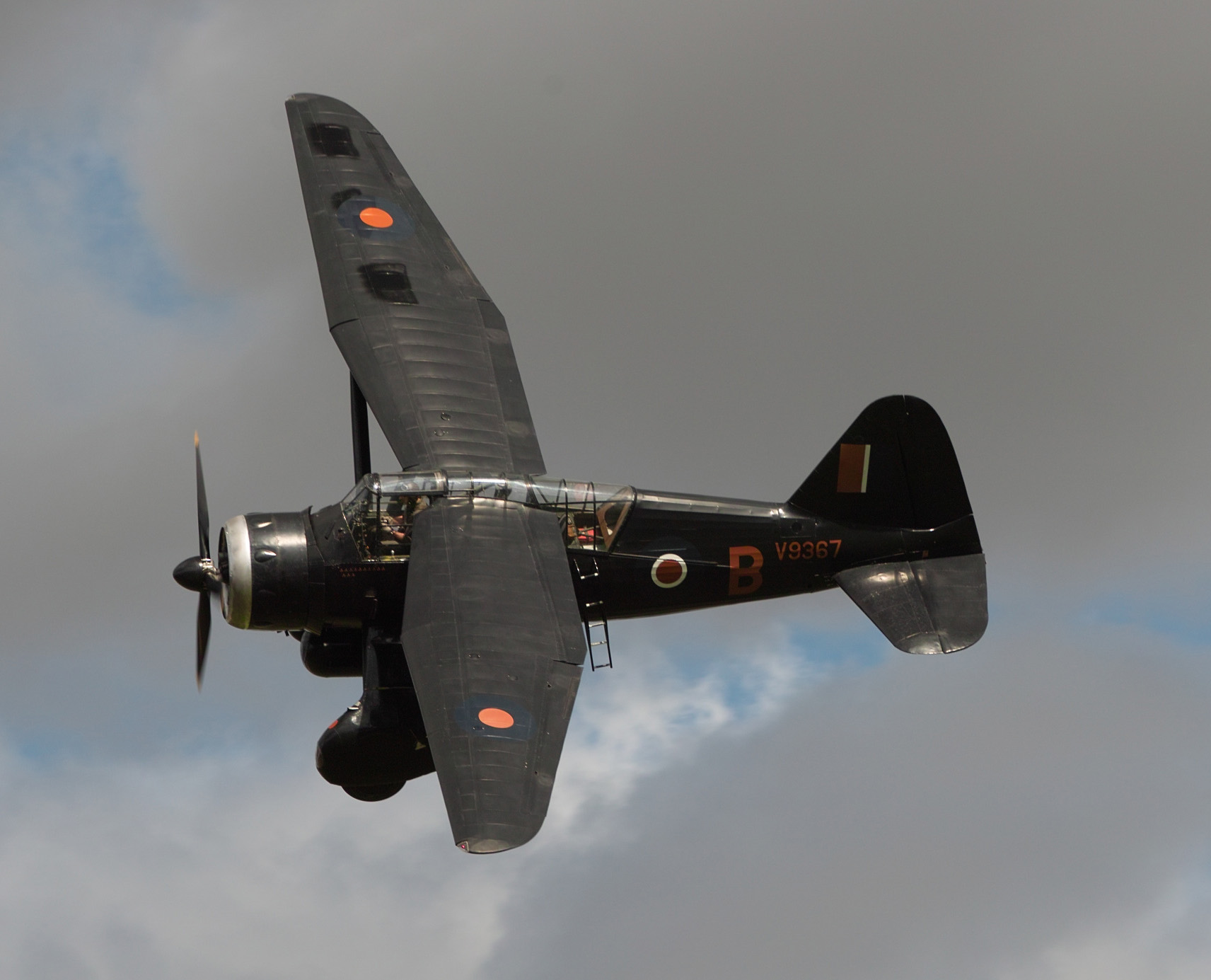
Westland Lysander Mk III (SD)

Throughout the war the Lysander was the principal aircraft used for pick-ups. The Lysander had been developed as an Army co-operation aircraft, intended to act as a spotter aircraft for artillery and to shuttle personnel as a liaison aircraft. In daylight service in France 1940 Lysanders were lost at an alarming rate. Their slow speed resulted in very low survive-ability in contested air space. Of the 178 Lysanders sent to France 118 were destroyed, and the type was soon retired from this role. However, the aircraft's exceptional short-field performance made it the ideal aircraft for covert ops and it was soon put to use in this role. The Lysander was ideal for landing on small, unimproved airstrips behind enemy lines. It was equipped with automatic slats which extended down when the aircraft was at low speeds to increase lift and lower its stall speed.

The aircraft was modified for its SD missions. The small standard bomb racks and forward firing machine guns, mounted to each wheel fairing, were removed. The rear firing machine gun for the observer/spotter was also removed. The aircraft's range was extended by adding a 150-gallon auxiliary fuel tank underneath the fuselage, which increased its round trip range from 600 miles to 1,150 miles. The rather large service radio was replaced with a much smaller one, and a rearward facing bench for 2 passengers was installed in the observer compartment with a stowage locker underneath. At the rear of the aircraft a shelf was built which also served as an additional seat, and a ladder was affixed to the left side of the fuselage. The peak year of activity for the Lysanders was 1943, when the Moon Squadrons made 125 landings in France.

=== Lockheed Hudson ===
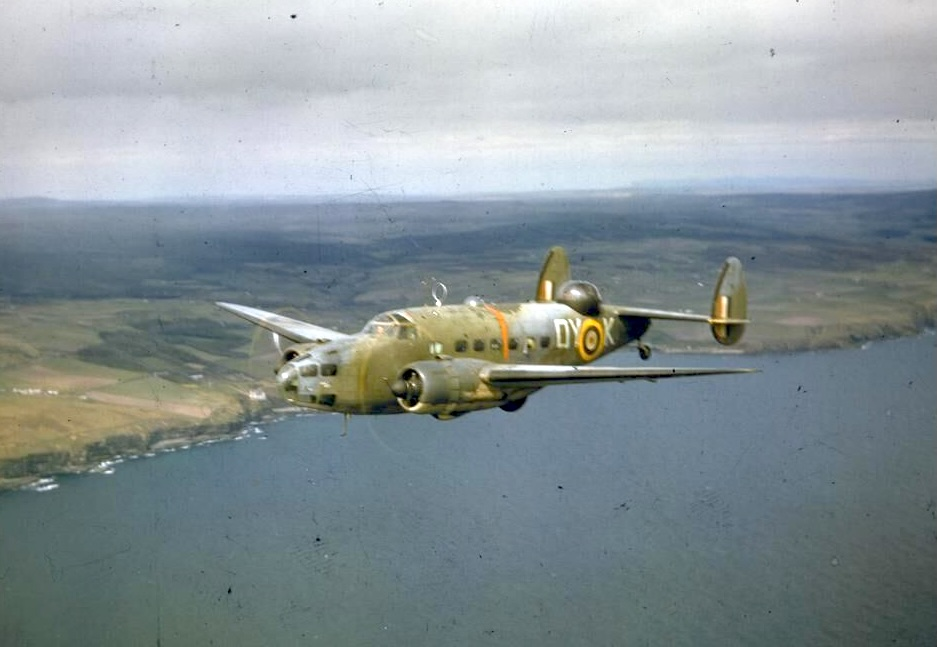
A Hudson in flight

When the number of people needed to be picked up was more than three 161 Squadron would send two Lysanders in missions they called "a double." The two aircraft were to coordinate their landings to minimize time on the ground and the risk of German intervention. This was difficult to do, as an aircraft in the dark of night was very hard to find, and radio transmissions brought their own risks. Consideration was given to making use of a larger aircraft. Sticky Murphy had already done a pick up using an Anson borrowed from a training unit, but the type was deemed underpowered and inappropriate for pick-ups. The squadron also had available a Lockheed Hudson brought over from the King's Flight. This proved to be an effective aircraft. The twin-engined aircraft had a range 200 miles (320 km) greater than the Lysander, and was faster. Its three-man crew included a navigator and a wireless operator, taking the burden of navigation off the shoulders of the pilot. Most importantly, it had the capacity to carry ten passengers, instead of the Lysander's three. On the down side the Hudson's greater weight and higher stall speed required a longer field to land on.

The use of the Hudson for pick-up missions was developed by Charles Pickard and Hugh Verity. By trial flights Pickard learned that the Hudson's stall speed was actually some 20 mph slower than what was stated in the plane's manual. Pickard showed Verity how to land a Hudson short, and together they worked out the operating procedures that enabled this twin-engined aircraft to operate to fields in occupied France. This gave the squadron the ability to carry in and bring out groups of as many as ten people in one mission using a single aircraft. The Hudson was three times the weight of the Lysander, and required three times the length to land. To accommodate this, the flare path was extended to 450 yards by adding two lamps. The 5 lights were spaced out, with the A, B, C and D lamps 150 yards from each other, and with the E lamp 50 yards to the right of D. The first Hudson operation was completed the night of 13/14 February by Wing Commander Pickard, flying five agents into a field near the River Loire.

=== Handley Page Halifax ===
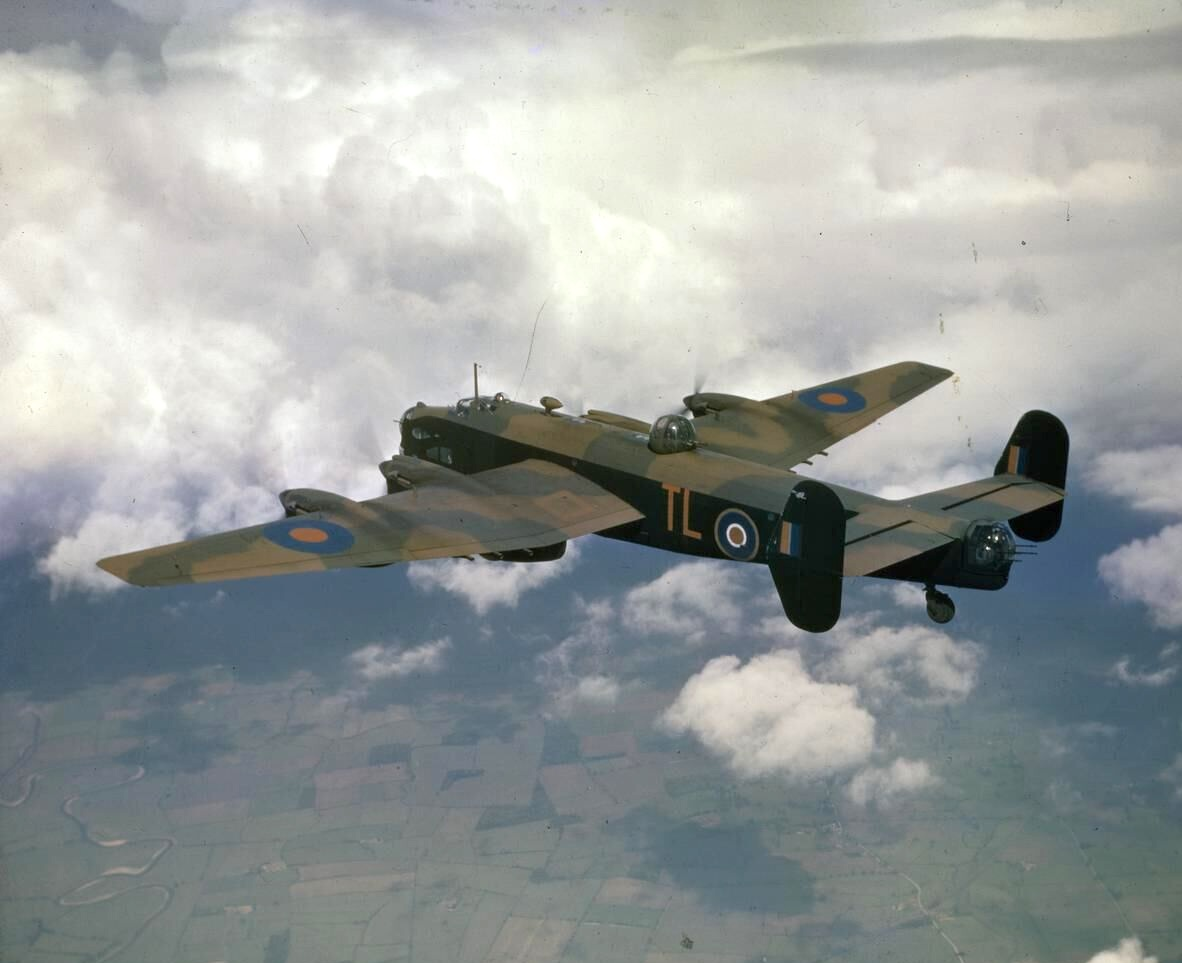
Halifax in daylight flight, 1942

The Halifax was a four engine bomber with a lifting load capacity of 13,000 lb, nearly twice the capacity of the Whitley. The Halifax replaced the Whitley in the special duties squadrons in late 1942. Used for parachuting supplies and agents, the Halifax had a much better range than the Whitley and was at a distinct advantage in long missions to Poland and the Balkans. The SD Halifaxes were modified to carry metal supply containers. The C-type metal containers were 6 feet long and weighed 250 pounds. Halifaxes could carry 15 of the C-type metal containers, whereas the Whitleys they replaced were limited to 12. The Halifax worked as the primary supply transport aircraft of the SD squadrons from late 1942 to mid 1944, when they were superseded by the Stirling.

=== Short Stirling ===
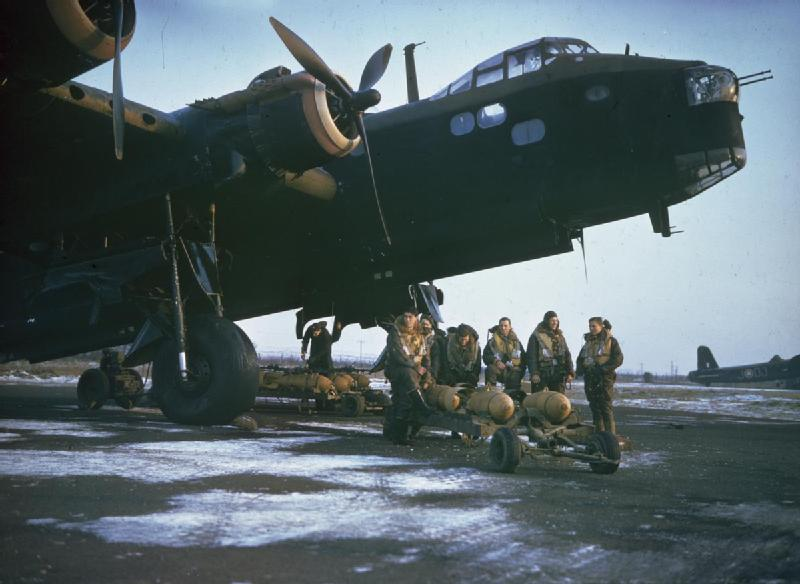
An enormous Stirling is loaded with bombs prior to its use with the SD squadrons

By mid 1943 the Short Stirling became available on loan from Bomber Command for service with the Special Duties squadrons. The Stirling was a large aircraft, designed in the late 1930s as the heavy bomber by which Bomber Command would conduct strategic bombing. From conception it was designed as a 4 engine bomber, and was huge. It had the capacity to lift 14,000 pounds. Though heavy and relatively underpowered, Stirlings had excellent low and medium altitude performance, were extremely manoeuvrable for a large plane and had a range of 3,000 miles. The Stirlings could carry 20 C-type metal supply containers, 33% more than the Halifax. This aircraft became available for full-time use with the special duties squadrons in May 1944 and they began re-equipping with them. By the end of the year it had replaced the Halifax.

=== Douglas Dakota ===
The SOE used the American-supplied Douglas Dakota late in the war. It was often landed in southern France and at airfields in territory held by partisans in the Balkans.

== Summation ==
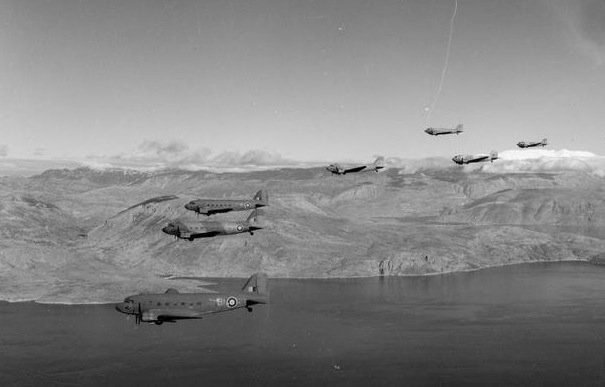
RAF SD Dakotas over the Adriatic

The SD pilots and aircrew received little recognition for the work they did, and certainly not at the time they were doing it. But the men that made up the special duties air units were a breed apart. As pilots they tended to be self-sufficient, able to problem solve and act on their own. Though excellent pilots and natural navigators, Hugh Verity offered that many would not have been as well suited to regular RAF officer duties. The pilots had to possess a certain intangible quality. The life of the special operations airman was that of the lone wolf.

By the end of 1941 138 Squadron had moved 37 agents to France while picking up 5. 55% of their missions failed due to either bad weather or failure to make contact with the reception operator. Over the course of 1942 the two SD squadrons, 138 Squadron and 161 Squadron, had ferried to France 23 tons of supplies and 155 agents, while picking up 19. 1943 saw the SD squadrons fly 625 sorties, deliver 589 tons of supplies and carry 102 agents to France while taking out 223. By the time the SD squadrons disbanded they had flown over 13,500 sorties and brought in over 10,000 tons of supplies, 60% of these supplies delivered after the invasion at Normandy. They had parachuted in 1,800 agents and brought another 324 in by Lysander or Hudson. They had also picked up 593 politicos, French resistance agents, family members, and the odd evading RAF or USAAF airman, and brought them back to England. As for the SOE itself, the organisation was dissolved six months after the end of the war, 15 January 1946.

An example of the effort given by the special duties units is the pick-up operation undertaken the night of 26/27 January 1943. René Massigli was a valued French political leader attempting to reach Charles de Gaulle in England. He had been held up by poor weather since November. It was for this reason that 161 Squadron commander Charles Pickard took up the mission himself. Taking one agent out with him in foul wintry weather, he traveled over a cloud covered France guided largely by dead reckoning and reached the target field area. Pickard was a doggedly determined aviator. Unable to see the reception committee's light, he continued to circle for two hours as his fuel level approached critical for his return flight. Finally a small break in the cloud gave him a glimpse of the signal light. He dropped through the cloud and quickly set down. Gauging his chances, Pickard gambled on a return flight to the nearest British airfield, RAF Predannack. As he made his way back he cleared France and most of the Channel, but as he approached the airfield at 3,000 feet his luck and his fuel ran out. Without power, he brought the Hudson in on a dead-stick landing, delivering his charges safely.

In three weeks Pickard would fly the pick-up operation that would earn him his third DSO. A year after that he died leading the Amien's prison raid. Learning of his death, Massigli offered this tribute to Pickard and the special duties units he was a part of:

"As one of the many Frenchman whom the RAF pilots helped to escape from France in the recent years of affliction, may I be allowed to pay to Group Captain Pickard my tribute of admiration, gratitude and regret?

The time has not yet come when it will be possible to reveal to the full what British airmen did in helping Resisting France. So much courage was demanded of them, so much ability and endurance when, on a moonlit night, they had to discover, somewhere in the French countryside, the field or glade that was ‘Target for tonight’. Among these admirable men, Group Captain Pickard was one of the greatest. Yesterday, as I was reading the thrilling story of the flight to Amiens, where he had a rendezvous with death, I was vividly reminded of the steady bravery, of the indomitable energy, of the boundless devotion to duty of the pilot who, although petrol was running low, tried with so much dogged obstinacy on a certain night of January 1943, to discover the field where he was briefed to drop a Frenchman and pick up another. That night the homeward bound passenger was Pierre Brosselette, who a few months later was to fall into the hands of the Gestapo and commit suicide rather than let out any of the secrets in his possession. Among the brave country folk who had escorted me to a field there was one, probably the best and the youngest, who was to lose his life last August on a maquis battlefield.

The men of the French Resistance will never forget that Group Captain Pickard, after giving them so much help in so many ways, at last gave up his life to rescue some of their fellow fighters."

René Massigli
