= No. 3 Group RAF =

Former Royal Air Force operations group

No. 3 Group
- No. 3 Group badge
- Active: 10 May 1918 – 31 August 1921; 1 April 1923 – 12 April 1926; 1 May 1936 – 1 November 1967; 1 April 2000 – 1 April 2006
- Country: United Kingdom
- Branch: Royal Air Force
- Type: Royal Air Force group
- Role: Strategic and tactical bombing
- Part of: RAF Bomber Command; RAF Strike Command
- Base: RAF Mildenhall (1936–1938)
- Mottos: Dutch: Niet zonder arbyt ("Nothing without Labour")
- Royal Air Force Ensign

Commanders
- Notable commanders: Air Chief Marshal Sir Ralph Alexander Cochrane

Insignia
- Group badge: Three swords in pile, the points upwards, and each enfiled by an astral crown (Note: The crowns represent the three Royal Abbesses of Ely, the three daughters of the Anglo-saxon King Anna of East Anglia of Exning; as most of the group's airfields were located around Ely, this was appropriate. The three swords represent the fighting spirit of the group and the Dutch motto is from the house of Cornelius Vermuyden, who drained the fens around Ely.)

No. 3 Group RAF (3 Gp) of the Royal Air Force was an RAF group first active in 1918, again between 1923 and 1926, then as part of RAF Bomber Command from 1936 to 1967, and recently part of RAF Strike Command from 2000 until it disbanded on 1 April 2006.

== First World War ==
No. 3 Group was first formed on 10 May 1918 as part of South-Eastern Area. No. 13 Group RAF was merged into No. 3 Group on 18 October 1919. Group Captain U J D Bourke took command on 30 November 1919. The Group was disbanded on 31 August 1921.

== 1920s ==
Reformed in 1923, 3 Group was disbanded on 12 April 1926 at RAF Spitalgate by renumbering it No. 23 (Training) Group.

== The 1930s and the Second World War ==
The Group was reformed at Andover, Wiltshire on 1 May 1936, under Air Vice-Marshal Patrick Playfair. Ten months later Group HQ moved to RAF Mildenhall in Suffolk, a direct result of the Air Ministry's decision to form two new bomber groups and reorganise its existing groups. No. 3 Group was initially equipped with the ungainly Vickers Virginia and Handley Page Heyford, which was the RAF's last biplane heavy bomber.

With the arrival of the then revolutionary twin engined Vickers Wellington it was decided that No. 3 Group would be tasked with introducing the type into front line service. The first squadron in Bomber Command to be equipped was No. 99 Squadron RAF based at Mildenhall, on 10 October 1938. Air Commodore A A B Thomson, Playfair's successor, was killed on 8 August 1939 while viewing the bombing up of a Vickers Wellington of No. 115 Squadron RAF. While under the fuselage, he slipped and was struck on the head by the rotating airscrew. Air Vice-Marshal J E A Baldwin took over the Group on 29 August 1939. By September 1939 the entire group (totalling six front line squadrons and two reserve squadrons) was fully equipped with an all-Wellington force totalling over 100 aircraft located at five East Anglian airfields. No. 3 Group continued to be primarily based in East Anglia for the rest of WWII. The Group's first wartime operations were attacks against German warships at Wilhelmshaven and Brunsbüttel.

Group HQ moved to Harraton House, Exning, Suffolk, in March 1940. On 2 April 1940, two squadrons were temporarily transferred to RAF Coastal Command and advanced bases in Northern Scotland, and they had hardly settled in before the Germans invaded Denmark and Norway. The squadrons went into action immediately and on 11/12 April one of them (115 Sqn) became the first RAF unit to bomb deliberately a mainland target (Stavanger Airport, Sola) during the Second World War. In September 1940 No. 3 Group Bomber Command assumed administrative control of No. 419 Flight, the first of the Royal Air Force Special Duties Service units. The group provided administrative support for all the Special Duties squadrons til the end of the war.

In 1942 the Group’s strength was almost halved when 7, 156, and 109 Squadrons were transferred to the newly created No. 8 Group – the Pathfinder Force.

No. 3 Group Headquarters – Harraton House, Exning, Suffolk.

=== Order of Battle, March 1943 ===
March 1943 No. 3 Group
| Squadron | Station | Aircraft |
| 15 Sqn | RAF Bourn | Short Stirling |
| 75 Sqn | RAF Newmarket | Stirling |
| 90 Sqn | RAF Ridgewell | Stirling |
| 115 Sqn | RAF East Wretham | Wellington, Lancaster |
| 138 (Special Duties) Sqn (Note: Special Duties squadrons flew supply and transport missions to enemy occupied Europe) | RAF Tempsford, Bedfordshire | Halifax |
| 149 Sqn | RAF Lakenheath, Suffolk | Stirling |
| 199 Sqn | RAF Lakenheath | Stirling |
| 161 (Special Duties) Sqn | RAF Tempsford | Westland Lysander, Halifax, Lockheed Hudson, Douglas Havoc, Armstrong Whitworth Albemarle, General Aircraft Cygnet |
| 192 (Special Duties) Sqn | RAF Gransden Lodge | Halifax, Wellington Mk.X de Havilland Mosquito, Wellington Mk.IC |
| 214 Sqn | RAF Chedburgh | Stirling |
| 218 Sqn | RAF Downham Market, Norfolk | Stirling |

No. 3 Group controlled the following bases at various times between March 1943 and November 1944:

| No. 31 Base | No. 32 Base | No. 33 Base |
|---|---|---|
| RAF Stradishall (HQ), Suffolk | RAF Mildenhall (HQ) | RAF Waterbeach (HQ) |
| RAF Chedburgh, Suffolk | RAF Birch, Essex | RAF Mepal |
| RAF Feltwell, Norfolk | RAF East Wretham, Norfolk | RAF Waterbeach |
| RAF Waterbeach, Cambridgeshire | RAF Gosfield | RAF Witchford |
| RAF Wratting Common | RAF Lakenheath, Suffolk | |
| RAF Shepherds Grove | RAF Methwold, Norfolk | |
| RAF Birch | RAF Newmarket | |
| RAF Gosfield | RAF Tuddenham | |
| RAF Matching | | |

After the invasion of Normandy, Bomber Command joined in the campaign against German oil targets. Although daylight bombing against targets within Germany itself still incurred too many casualties closer targets could be attacked by day with fighter escorts. 3 Group carried out blind bombing techniques by day using Gee-H.

=== Order of Battle, April 1945 ===
3 Group, April 1945
| 15 Sqn | RAF Bourn | Avro Lancaster Mks. I and III |
| 75 Sqn | RAF Mepal | Lancaster Mks. I and III |
| 90 Sqn | RAF Tuddenham, | Lancaster Mks. I and III |
| 115 Sqn | RAF Witchford | Lancaster Mks. I and III |
| 138 (Special Duties) Sqn (Note: re-equipped with Lancaster replacing Halifax and reassigned to 3 Group in March 1945) | RAF Tuddenham | Lancaster Mks. I and III |
| 149 Sqn | RAF Methwold | Lancaster Mks. I and III |
| 186 Sqn | RAF Stradishall | Lancaster Mks. I and III |
| 195 Sqn | RAF Wratting Common | Lancaster Mks. I and III |
| 218 Sqn | RAF Chedburgh | Lancaster Mks. I and III |
| 514 Sqn | RAF Waterbeach | Lancaster Mks. I, II and III |
| 622 Sqn | RAF Mildenhall | Lancaster Mks. I and III |
| Training units, e.g. No. 1688 Flight | RAF Feltwell | |
| Headquarters | Exning | |

== Post war ==
The Group HQ moved back to Mildenhall in January 1947. In June 1948, No.3 Group consisted of 35, 115, 149, and 207 Squadrons operating Lancasters from RAF Stradishall, Nos 7, 49, 148, and 214 Squadrons operating Lancasters from RAF Upwood, and 15, 44, 90, 138 Squadrons operating Lincolns from RAF Wyton. For a period in the early 1950s several squadrons flew Boeing Washingtons, the British name for Boeing B-29 Superfortresses lent to the UK until the English Electric Canberra could enter service. Most of the Vickers Valiant and Handley Page Victor, squadrons, made operational in the late 1950s, formed part of No. 3 Group. During the Suez Crisis of 1956 Valiants of 138, 148, 207 and 214 Squadrons were deployed to RAF Luqa in Malta and the first Valiant attacks against Egyptian airfields began on 31 October 1956, with limited results due to the lack of experience operating the Valiant.

No. 3 Group was also responsible for the Thor ballistic missile between 1 September 1958 and August 1963, with ten squadrons, including Nos:-

- 77 Headquartered at RAF Feltwell
- 82 Headquartered at RAF Shepherds Grove
- 107 Headquartered at RAF Tuddenham
- 113 Headquartered at RAF Mepal
- 130 Headquartered at RAF Polebrook
- 144 Headquartered at RAF North Luffenham
- 218 Headquartered at RAF Harrington
- 220 Headquartered at RAF North Pickenham
- 223 Headquartered at RAF Folkingham
- 254 Headquartered at RAF Melton Mowbray

each with three missiles, being equipped with the weapon.

During April 1962 the group also controlled:

- RAF Mildenhall
  - No. 3 Group Communications Flight with Avro Anson multi-role aircraft and de Havilland Chipmunk primary trainer aircraft
- RAF Cottesmore
  - 10 Sqn with Handley Page Victor strategic bomber
  - 15 Sqn with Handley Page Victor strategic bomber
- RAF Gaydon
  - No. 232 Operational Conversion Unit RAF - Valiant & Canberra
  - Radar Reconnaissance Flight RAF with Handley Page Victor strategic bomber
- RAF Honington
  - 55 Sqn with Handley Page Victor strategic bomber
  - 57 Sqn with Handley Page Victor strategic bomber
  - 90 Sqn - Valiant
- RAF Marham
  - 49 Sqn - Valiant
  - 148 Sqn - Valiant
  - 207 Sqn - Valiant
  - 214 Sqn - Valiant
- RAF Wittering
  - 7 Sqn - Valiant
  - 138 Sqn - Valiant
  - 139 Sqn with Handley Page Victor strategic bomber
- RAF Wyton
  - 58 Sqn - Canberra
  - 543 Sqn - Valiant

On 1 November 1967 the Group was absorbed by No. 1 (Bomber) Group RAF.

The Group was reformed on 1 April 2000 to control Joint Force Harrier and maritime aircraft transferred from the former No. 11/18 Group RAF. It came under a Royal Navy officer, the Flag Officer Maritime Aviation. Rear Admiral Iain Henderson was the first occupant of the post, who also had the NATO roles of COMAIREASTLANT and COMMARAIRNORTH. AOC 3 Group/FOMA had two RAF subordinates, Air Commodore Harrier (for all the RAF Harriers and FAA Sea Harriers) and Air Commodore Maritime (for the Nimrods and SAR helicopters). After a further reorganisation in 2003-4, the group became known as the Battle Management Group and controlled the Airborne Early Warning aircraft, ground-based radar installations, maritime reconnaissance aircraft and the search and rescue helicopters in the UK. The group was based alongside Strike Command at RAF High Wycombe, Buckinghamshire.

In 2006 the Group consisted of:

3 Gp Headquarters – RAF High Wycombe

- RAF Bentley Priory
- RAF Boulmer
- RAF Fylingdales
- RAF Neatishead
- 5 Sqn, RAF Waddington
- 8 Sqn, RAF Waddington
- 22 Sqn, A Flight & HQ, RMB Chivenor
- 22 Sqn, B Flt, RAF Wattisham
- 22 Sqn, C Flt, RAF Valley
- 23 Sqn, RAF Waddington
- 42(R) Sqn Squadron, RAF Kinloss
- 51 Sqn, RAF Waddington
- 120 Sqn Squadron, RAF Kinloss
- 201 Sqn Squadron, RAF Kinloss
- 202 Sqn, A Flt & HQ, RAF Boulmer
- 202 Sqn, D Flt, RAF Lossiemouth
- 202 Sqn, E Flt, RAF Leconfield
- SARF / 203(R) Sqn Squadron, RAF St. Mawgan (disbanded from April 2009)

As from 1 April 2006, the stations and squadrons which were under the command of 3 Group RAF were brought under the command of No. 2 Group RAF.

== Commanders ==
1919–1921

- 30 November 1919 Group Captain U J D Bourke
- 23 November 1920 Group Captain Arthur Longmore

1923–1926

- 16 April 1923 Air Commodore Tom Webb-Bowen
- 7 March 1924 Air Commodore Lionel Charlton
- 2 January 1925 Air Commodore Robert Gordon
- 1 October 1925 Air Commodore Ian Bonham-Carter

1936–1967

- 1 May 1936 Air Vice-Marshal Patrick Playfair
- 14 February 1938 Air Commodore A A B Thomson (killed on duty 8 August 1939)
- 29 August 1939 Air Vice-Marshal Jack Baldwin
- 14 September 1942 Air Vice-Marshal The Hon Ralph Cochrane
- 27 February 1943 Air Vice-Marshal R Harrison
- 28 February 1946 Air Vice-Marshal A C Collier
- Post vacant
- 9 July 1946 Air Vice-Marshal Robert Foster
- 18 March 1947 Air Vice-Marshal Lawrence Darvall
- 14 December 1948 Air Vice-Marshal Allan Hesketh
- 15 September 1951 Air Vice-Marshal William Brook
- 1 September 1953 Air Vice-Marshal Edmund Hudleston
- 2 February 1956 Air Vice-Marshal Kenneth Cross
- 4 May 1959 Air Vice-Marshal M H Dwyer
- 9 October 1961 Air Vice-Marshal Brian Burnett
- 5 August 1964 Air Vice-Marshal Denis Spotswood
- 26 November 1965 Air Vice-Marshal Denis Smallwood

2000–2006

- 1 April 2000 Rear-Admiral Iain R Henderson (Royal Navy – Fleet Air Arm)
- 24 July 2001 Rear-Admiral Scott Lidbetter (Royal Navy – Fleet Air Arm)
- 7 October 2003 Air Vice-Marshal A D White

== See also ==
- List of Royal Air Force groups
