= No. 138 Squadron RAF =

Defunct flying squadron of the Royal Air Force

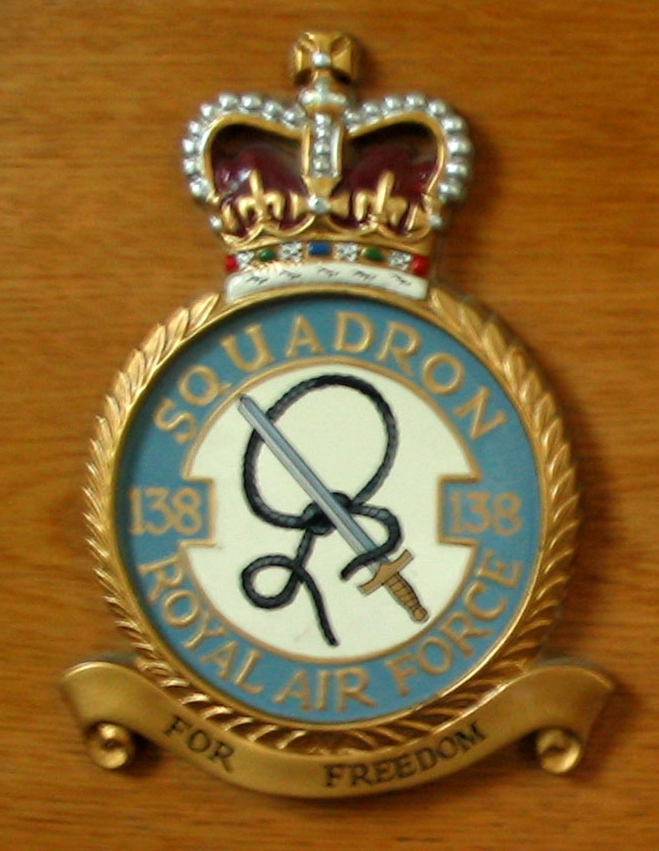
- Squadron badge
- Active: 30 Sep 1918 – 1 Feb 1919; 25 Aug 1941 – 1 Sep 1950; 1 Jan 1955 – 1 Apr 1962
- Country: United Kingdom
- Branch: Royal Air Force
- Role: Fighter; Special Operations; Bomber
- Motto: For Freedom

Insignia
- Squadron Badge heraldry: A sword in bend, the point uppermost, severing a reef knot
- Squadron Codes: NF (Aug 1941 – Mar 1945, Apr 1947 – Sep 1950); AC (Mar 1945 – Apr 1947)

No. 138 Squadron RAF was a squadron of the Royal Air Force that served in a variety of roles during its career, last disbanded in 1962. It was the first 'V-bomber' squadron of the RAF, flying the Vickers Valiant between 1955 and 1962.

== History ==
=== Formation in World War I as fighter squadron ===
No. 138 Squadron RAF was originally to be formed as a fighter unit on 1 May 1918, but formation was suspended until officially formed on 30 September 1918 as a fighter-reconnaissance squadron at Chingford, and was disbanded there on 1 February 1919.

=== Special Duties in World War II ===
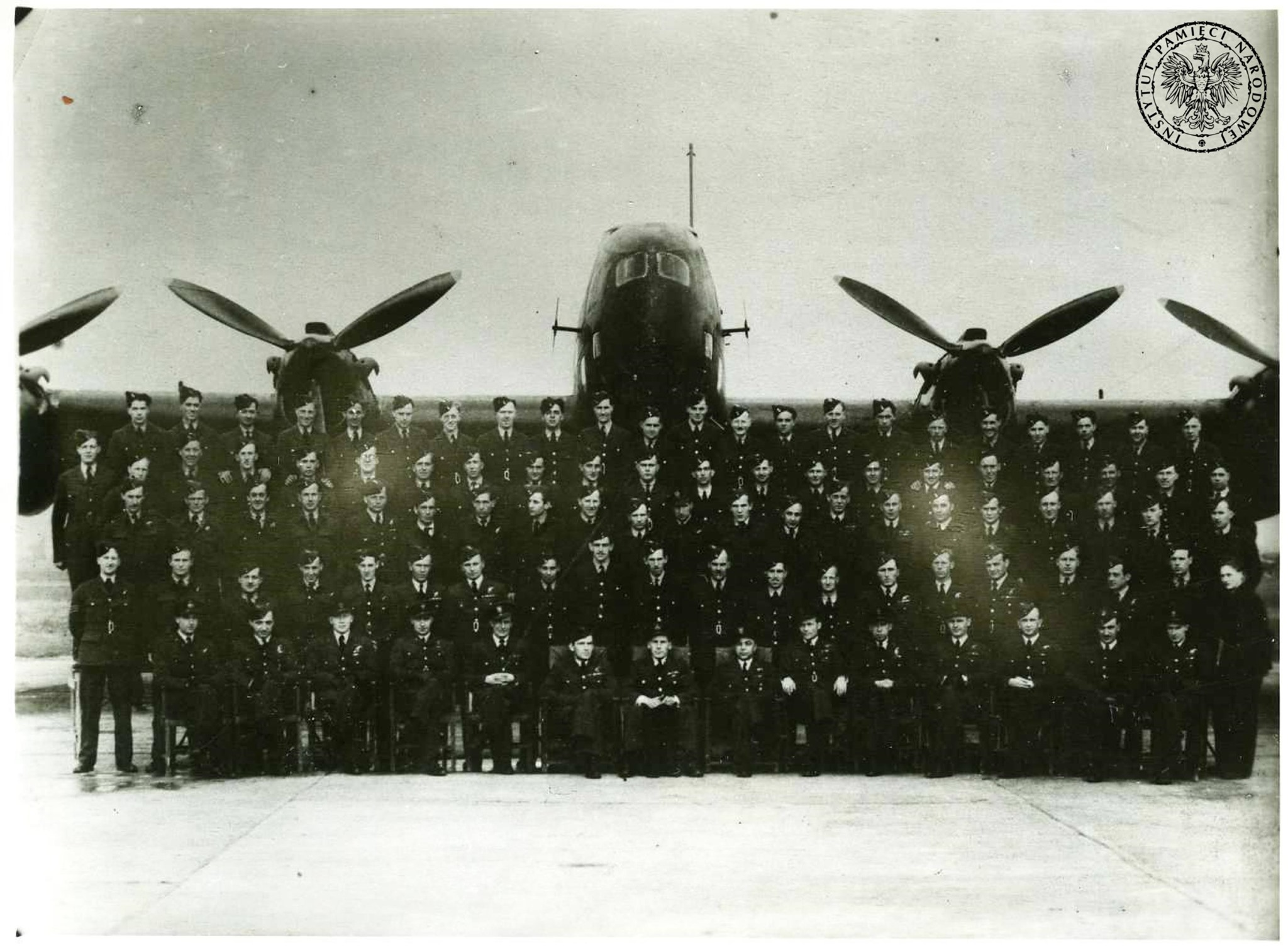
Polish Flight "C", April 1943, Tempsford

During World War II, it was reformed in 1941, from the expansion of No. 1419 Flight, and was the first squadron of the Royal Air Force Special Duty Service. In February 1942 the squadron's Lysander flight and a number of its Whitleys were hived off to make the nucleus of 161 (Special Duty) Squadron. Based initially at RAF Stradishall, in March 1942, 138 Squadron moved to its permanent home at the clandestine airfield at RAF Tempsford. The squadron dropped supplies and agents for the SIS and the SOE to Axis occupied territory. From October 1941 there served several all-Polish volunteer crews. Between 1 April 1943 and November 1943 the squadron included Polish Special Duties Flight, as C Flight. It carried out this role until March 1945 when it was reassigned to Bomber Command, operating under No. 3 Group. It was disbanded on 1 September 1950.

=== V-Bomber squadron post-war ===
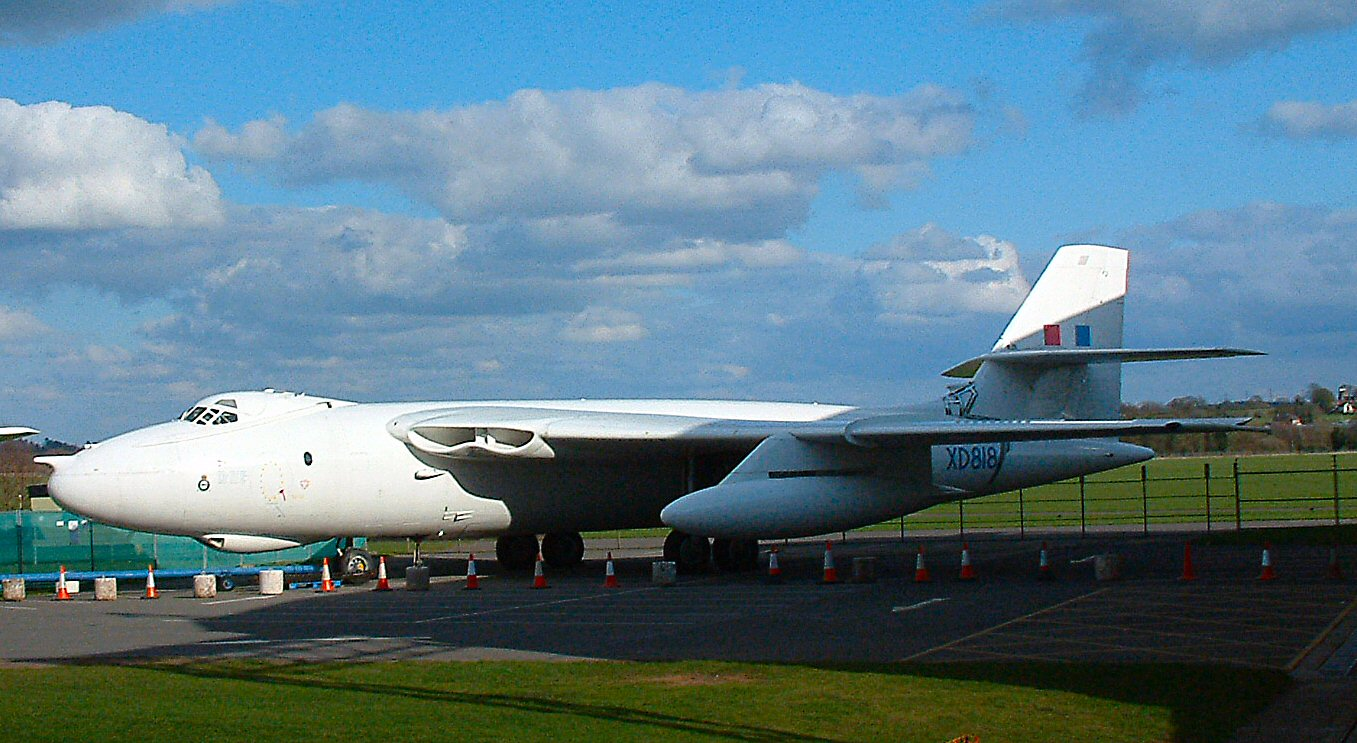
Vickers Valiant B.1 XD818 – photo taken at RAF Museum Cosford, just prior to going on display with two other 'V bombers', the Handley Page Victor and Avro Vulcan in the Cold War Jets Collection

On 1 January 1955 the squadron was reformed as the first squadron to be equipped with the Vickers Valiant strategic nuclear bomber, based at RAF Gaydon and later moving to RAF Wittering. It flew them from Malta during the Suez Crisis of October 1956, and was finally disbanded on 1 April 1962.

== Aircraft operated ==
From	To	Aircraft	Variant
Sep 1918	Feb 1919	Bristol F.2 Fighter	F.2b
Aug 1941	Mar 1942	Westland Lysander	Mk.IIIa
Aug 1941	Nov 1942	Armstrong Whitworth Whitley	Mk.V
Aug 1941	Aug 1944	Handley Page Halifax	Mk.II
Jan 1943	Aug 11 1944	Handley Page Halifax	Mk.V
Aug 28 1944	Mar 1945	Short Stirling	Mk.V
Mar 1945	Sep 1947	Avro Lancaster	Mks.I and III
Sep 1947	Sep 1950	Avro Lincoln	B.2
Feb 1955	Mar 1962	Vickers Valiant	B.1
Mar 1956	May 1961	Vickers Valiant	B(PR).1
Mar 1956	Aug 1961	Vickers Valiant	B(PR)K.1
Jun 1956	Apr 1962	Vickers Valiant	B(K).1

== See also ==
- No. 301 Polish Bomber Squadron
