= RAF Tempsford =

Former RAF airfield in England

RAF Tempsford
- Near Tempsford, Bedfordshire in England
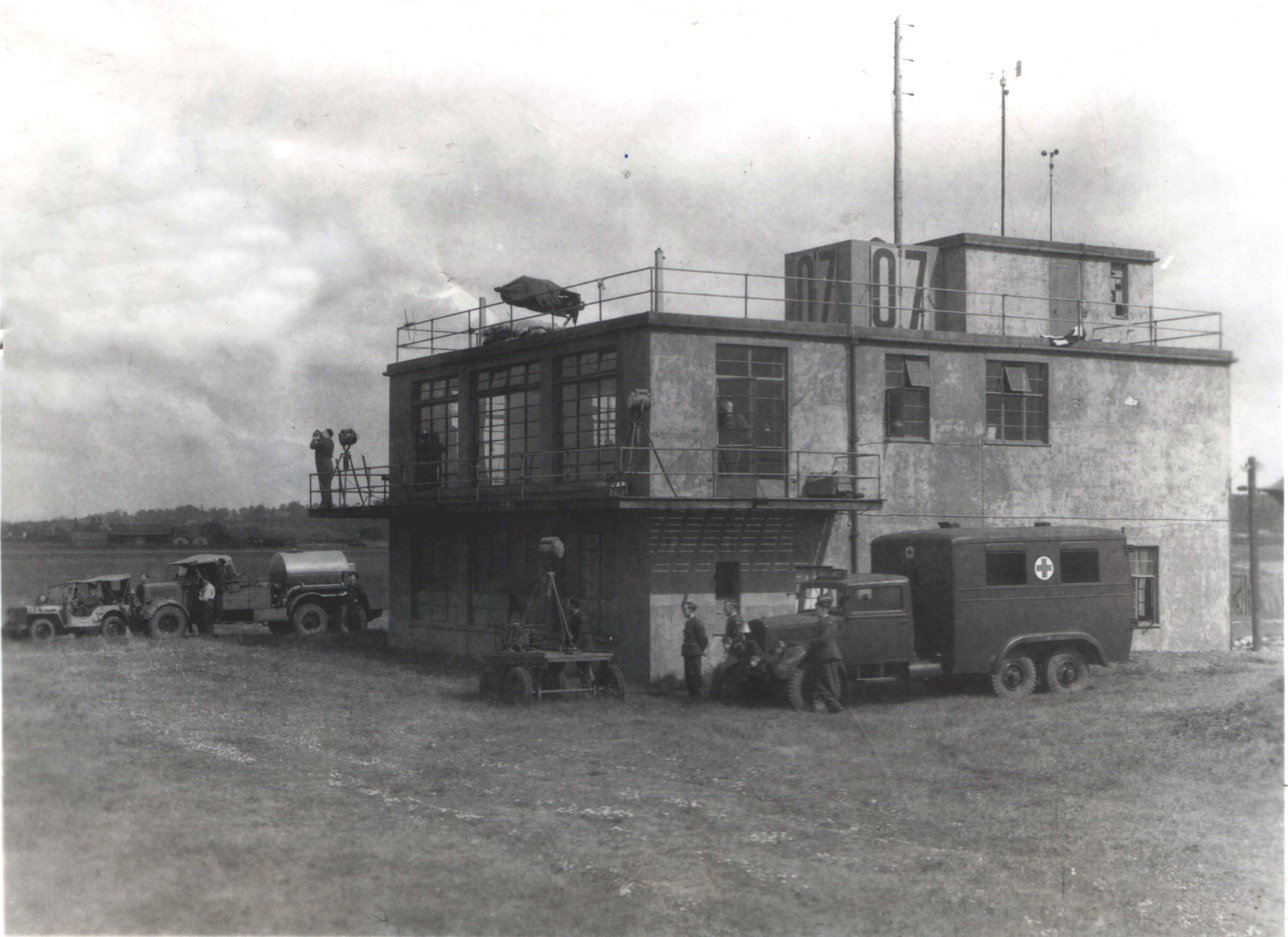
- The Control Tower at Tempsford during the Second World War

Site information
- Type: Royal Air Force station
- Code: TE/TQ
- Owner: Air Ministry
- Operator: Royal Air Force
- Controlled by: RAF Bomber Command

Location
- Shown within Bedfordshire RAF Tempsford (the United Kingdom)
- Coordinates: 52°09′31″N 000°15′49″W

Site history
- Built: 1941
- Built by: John Laing & Son Ltd; Balfour Beatty
- In use: 1941 - February 1963
- Battles/wars: European theatre of World War II

Airfield information
- Elevation: 19 metres (62 ft) AMSL
Runways
Direction	Length and surface
03/21	1,420 metres (4,659 ft) Concrete
06/24	1,400 metres (4,593 ft) Concrete
12/30	1,215 metres (3,986 ft) Concrete

Royal Air Force Tempsford or more simply RAF Tempsford is a former Royal Air Force station located 2.3 miles (3.7 km) north east of Sandy, Bedfordshire, England and 4.4 miles (7.1 km) south of St. Neots, Cambridgeshire, England.

The airfield was home to 138 (Special Duty) Squadron and 161 (Special Duty) Squadron, which dropped supplies and agents into occupied Europe for the Special Operations Executive (SOE). 138 (SD) Squadron handled most of the supply and agent drops, while 161 (SD) Squadron had the Lysander flight, and did the insertion and pick-up operations in occupied Europe.

RAF Tempsford is very close to Little Gransden Airfield and can be clearly seen from flights climbing out from the westerly runway 28. Other active airfields nearby include the former RAF bases at Gransden Lodge and Bourn.

== Units ==
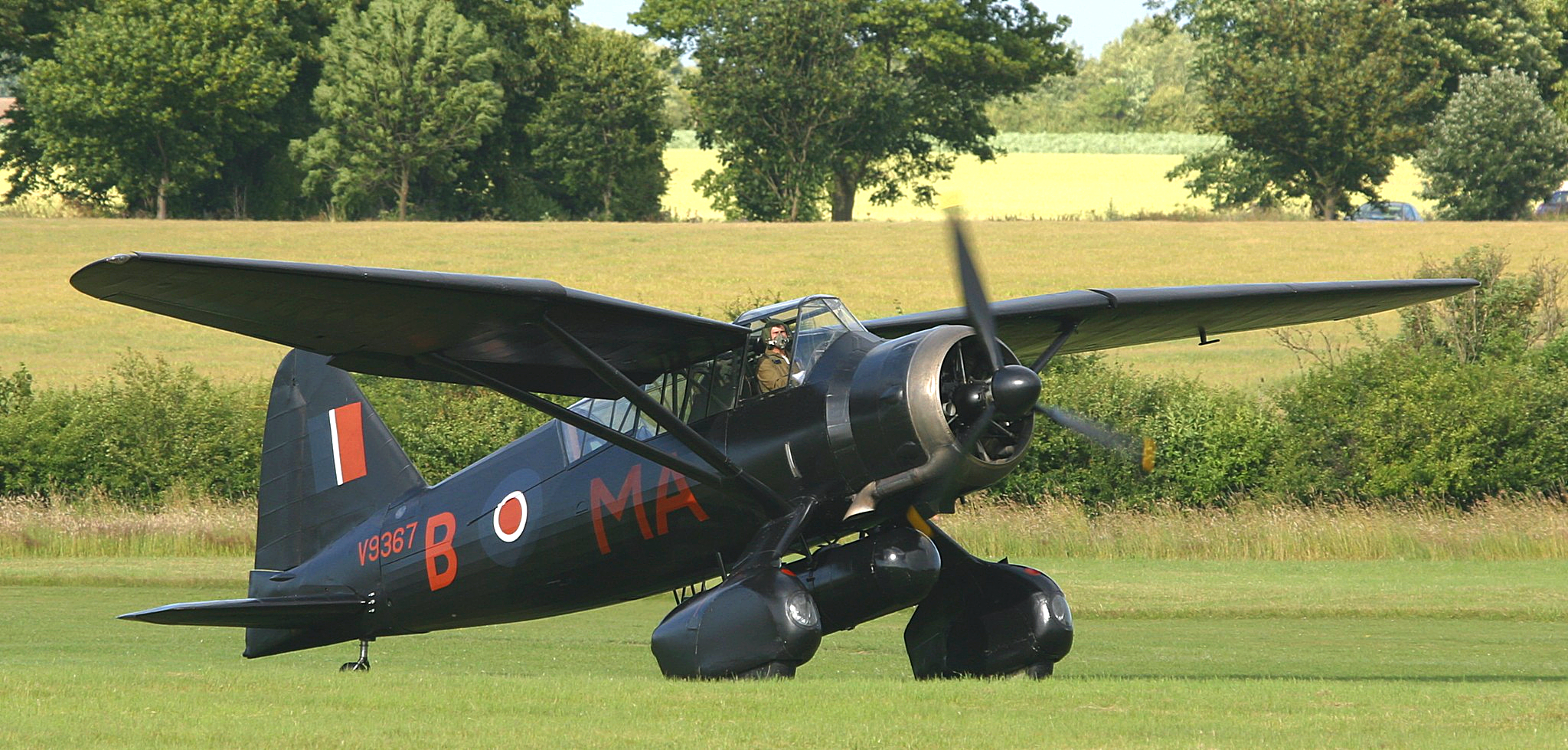
A Westland Lysander of the type that was used to drop and pick up SOE agents from Occupied Europe

- No. 53 Squadron RAF detachment (1946) - Consolidated Liberator VI and VIII
- No. 109 Squadron RAF (1942) - Vickers Wellington I
- No. 138 Squadron RAF (1942-1944) - Handley Page Halifax II and V
- No. 149 Squadron RAF (1943-1944) - Short Stirling III
- No. 161 Squadron RAF (1942-1945) - Westland Lysander IIIA and other types
- No. 426 Squadron RCAF (1945) - Consolidated Liberator VIII
- No. 617 Squadron RAF detachment (1945) - Avro Lancaster I & III
- No. 1 Transport Aircraft Modification Unit
- No. 11 Operational Training Unit RAF
- No. 48 Group Communication Flight RAF
- No. 107 (Special Duties) Wing RAF
- No. 273 Maintenance Unit RAF
- No. 1418 Flight RAF
- No. 1575 (Special Duties) Flight RAF
- No. 1586 (Polish Special Duties) Flight
- No. 2722 Squadron RAF Regiment

== Tempsford now ==
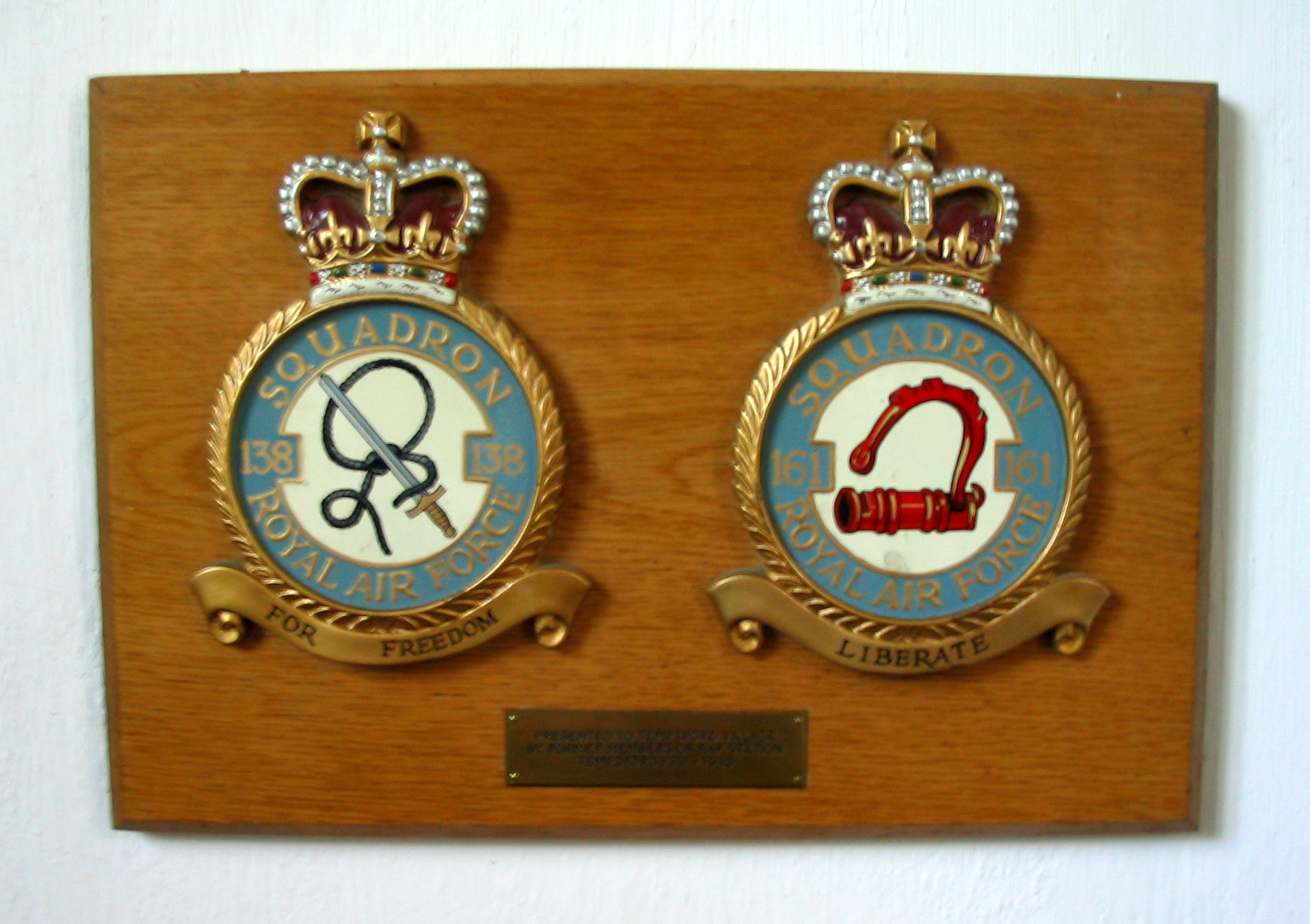
The 138 and 161 Squadron badges on display inside St Peter's Church, Tempsford

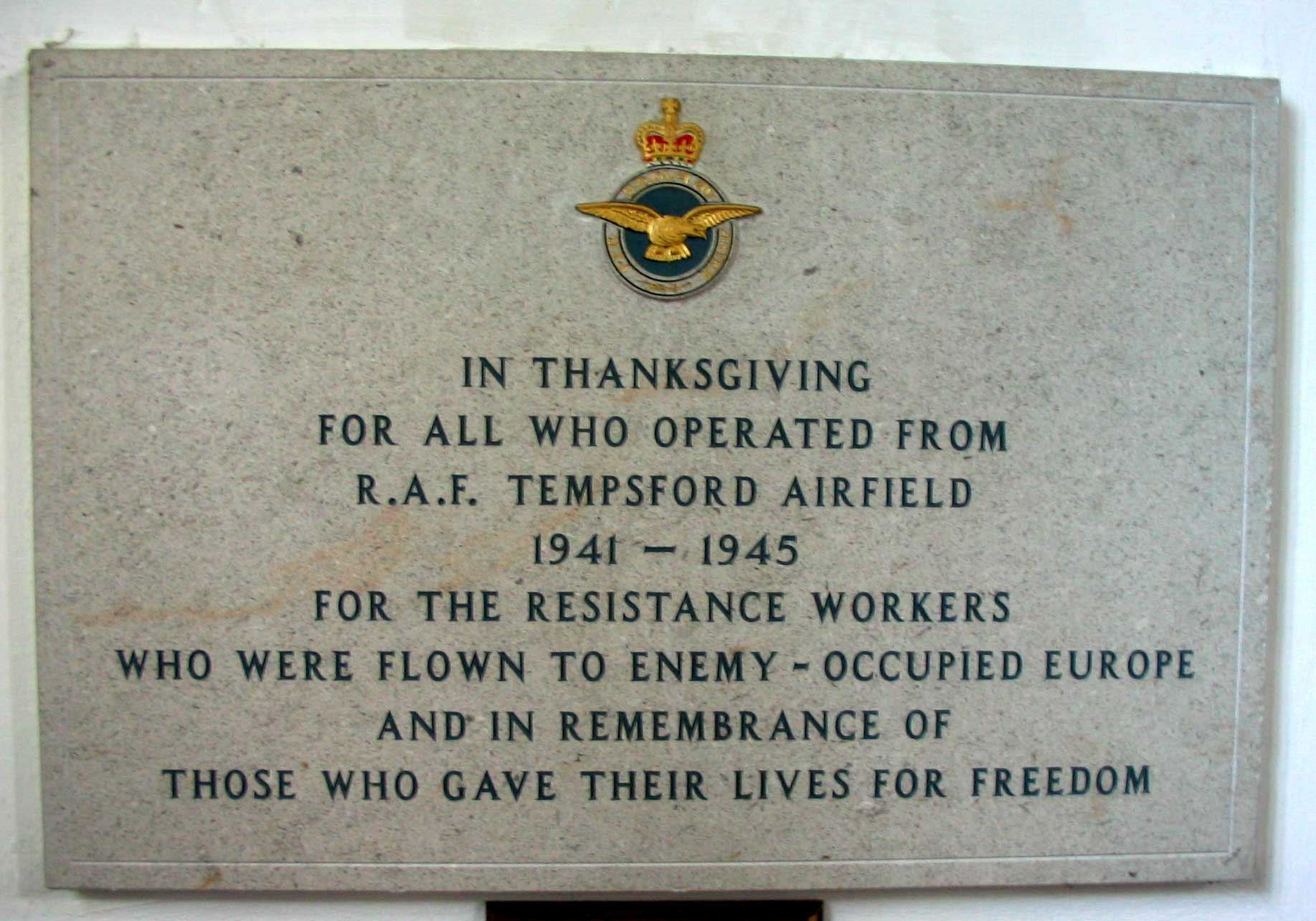
The memorial plaque inside St Peter's Church, Tempsford

By 2002 part of the former Tempsford airfield was a concrete-making facility and some of the main airfield buildings had been turned into various commercial workshops. A nearby public footpath led to the end of a substantially intact runway and then on to Gibraltar Farm, the agents' final dispatch point.

This barn contains several plaques and memorials to the agents, both men and women, who were flown from the airfield, many of whom were later killed after being captured and tortured. A memorial is also to be found in St Peter's Church, in the nearby village of Tempsford, and the Tempsford Memorial is outside the church, commemorating the men and women who served as secret agents in occupied Europe during the Second World War and the RAF aircrew who transported them.

=== People ===
- Andrée Borrel and Lise de Baissac (Odile) were the first female SOE agents to be parachuted into occupied France. They flew out from RAF Tempsford on 24 September 1942.
- Flying Officer Gerald Cruwys was awarded the Croix de Guerre for his work with the French Resistance while at RAF Tempsford.
- Group Captain Edward 'Mouse' Fielden, Station Commander of RAF Tempsford (1942-1944) and a former royal pilot.
- Air Chief Marshal Sir Lewis Macdonald Hodges was the Commander of 161 Squadron from May 1943 to 1944.
- Group Captain Percy Charles Pickard was awarded a second bar to his DSO in March 1943 for his outstanding leadership in command of 161 Squadron.
- Group Captain Hugh Verity, author of We Landed by Moonlight.
- Violette Szabo GC of the SOE flew on her first mission into France from RAF Tempsford.
- Wing Commander F. F. E. Yeo-Thomas, otherwise known as the White Rabbit, was dropped into France on 27 February 1943 having been flown out from RAF Tempsford by Pilot Officer Foster.
