= No. 149 Squadron RAF =

Defunct flying squadron of the Royal Air Force

No. 149 (East India) Squadron RAF
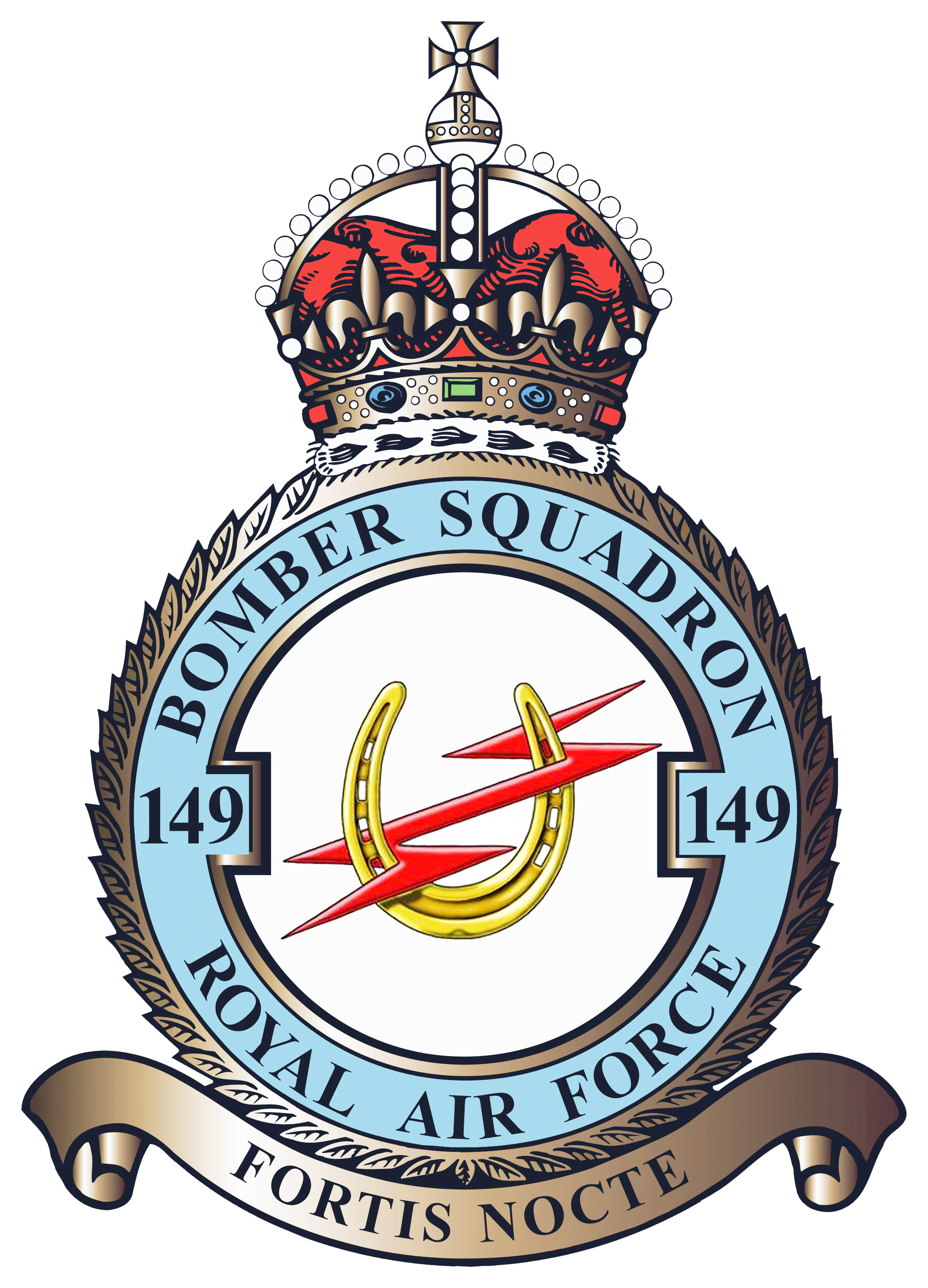
- Squadron badge
- Active: 3 March 1918 – 1 August 1919; 12 April 1937 – 1 March 1950; 14 August 1950 – 31 August 1956
- Country: United Kingdom
- Branch: Royal Air Force
- Type: Bomber
- Role: Night bombing
- Part of: RAF Bomber Command
- Nickname: East India
- Mottos: Latin: Fortis Nocte ("Strong by Night")

Insignia
- Squadron Badge heraldry: A horseshoe and a flash of lightning interlaced
- Squadron Codes: LY (Oct 1938 – Sep 1939); OJ (Sep 1939 – Nov 1949); TK (for 'C' flight) (Feb 1943 – Jun 1945)

No. 149 Squadron RAF was a Royal Air Force Squadron between 1918 and 1956. Formed 1918 in the Royal Flying Corps as a night-bomber unit, it remained in that role for the rest of its existence which spanned three periods between 1918 and 1956.

== History ==
=== World War I ===
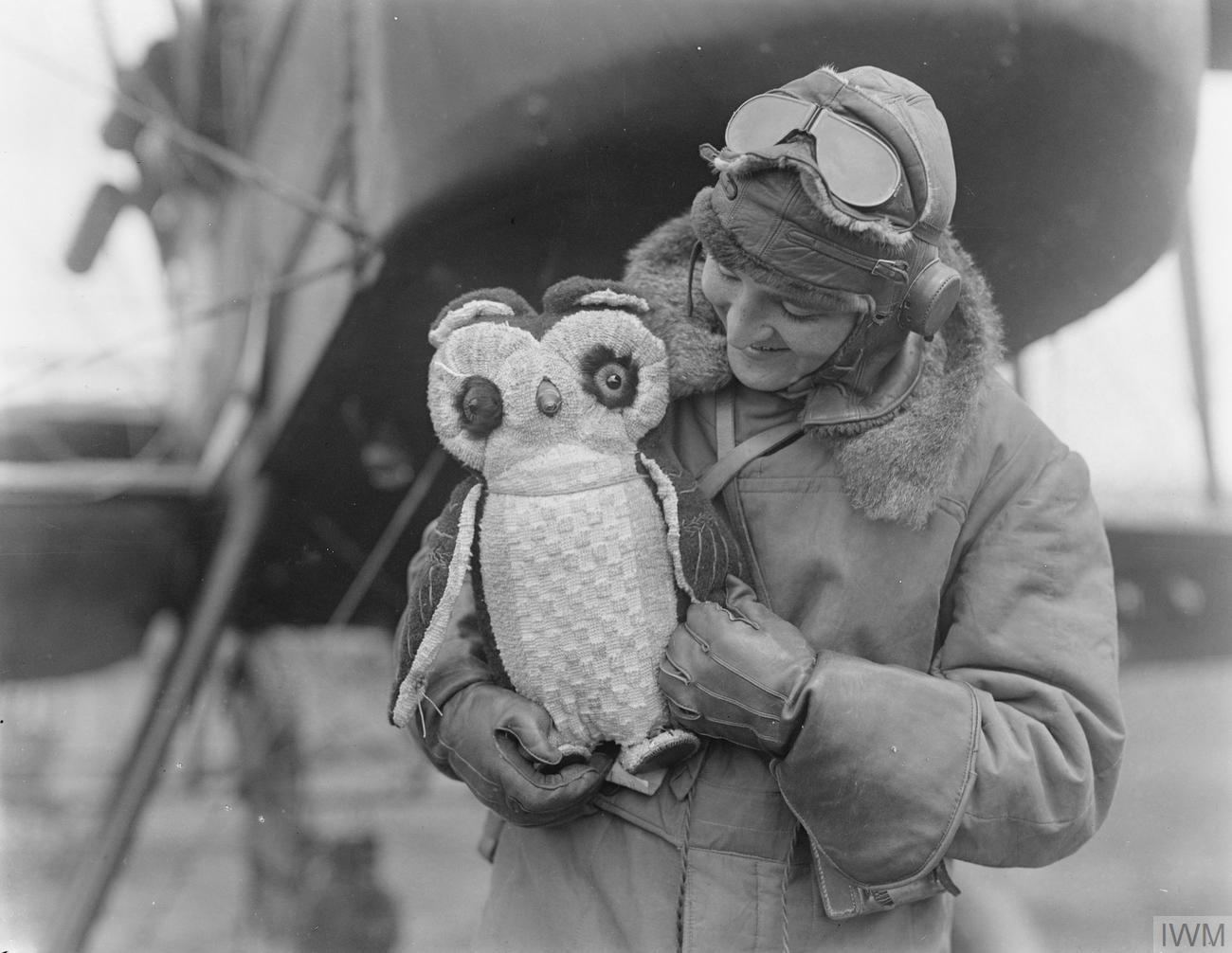
A toy owl mascot of a pilot of No. 149 Night Bombing Squadron. Behind him can be seen the nose of his Royal Aircraft Factory F.E.2b. Aerodrome near St. Omer, 18 July 1918.

Formed on 3 March 1918 at Royal Flying Corps Station Ford, near Yapton, West Sussex, as No. 149 (NB) Squadron RFC, the squadron soon moved to France for night bombing missions above occupied France and Belgium, flying Royal Aircraft Factory F.E.2s. After the war the squadron for three months took part in the occupation force in Germany, being stationed at Bickendorf, moving to Ireland in March 1919 where the squadron was disbanded on 1 August 1919.

=== World War II ===
==== Vickers Wellington ====
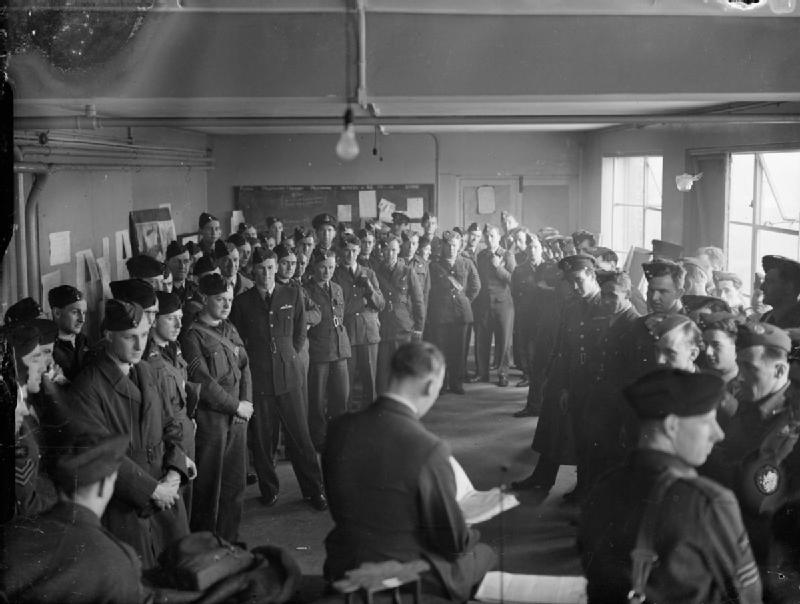
149 Squadron aircrew before being briefed for a raid at RAF Mildenhall

The squadron was reformed from 'B' Flight of No. 99 Squadron RAF on 12 April 1937 under No. 3 Group RAF at RAF Mildenhall, Suffolk where it remained until April 1942. Initially equipped with Heyford biplane bombers, the squadron converted to Vickers Wellingtons in January 1939. On 4 September 1939 L4259 was flown on "Ops Brunsbüttel 4/500 GP", the day after the declaration of war against Germany by Great Britain. (Source Pilot's Logbook).

==== Target for Tonight ====
During the last two weeks of March and the first two weeks of April 1941, Wellingtons and their crews of No. 149 Sqn were used for the making of the film Target for Tonight. Filmed on location at RAF Mildenhall, the Station took the fictitious name of Millerton Aerodrome in order so not to give away valuable operational information to the enemy, and several other aspects were altered involving the day-to-day operations. The film, produced by the Crown Film Unit, focused on the planning and execution of an air raid on Germany, as seen by the crew of Vickers Wellington OJ-F 'F for Freddie'. The exception to this was Percy Pickard who was at that time Squadron Leader with No. 311 (Czechoslovak) Squadron. Pickard played the part of Sqn Ldr Dickson, the captain of 'F for Freddie'.

==== Short Stirling ====
After being re-equipped with the Short Stirling in November 1941, the squadron took part in the first 1,000 bomber raid. The squadron also formed No. 149 Squadron Conversion flight on 21 January 1942 to train new Stirling crews and on 7 October this was formed into 1657 Heavy Conversion Unit together with 7, 101 and 218 Squadron Conversion Flights. In August 1944, the Stirlings gave way to Avro Lancasters, which served the squadron until 1949. At the end of the war no. 149 squadron participated in Operation Manna, to drop food to the starved Dutch population still under German occupation, and Operation Exodus, to return former prisoners of war back to the UK.

=== Post war ===
After the war no. 149 squadron continued to fly with RAF Bomber Command, moving to RAF Tuddenham in April 1946 and then later in November on to RAF Stradishall. In February 1949 the squadron returned to RAF Mildenhall, where the Lancasters were replaced with Avro Lincolns. The squadron remained at Mildenhall until disbanding on 1 March 1950.

Retirement was short though, because on 14 August 1950 the squadron was reformed as the RAF's first Boeing Washington bomber unit, moving to RAF Coningsby in October of that year. The Washingtons were on loan by the RAF from the USAF as an interim nuclear bomber pending the arrival of the RAF's own jet bomber, the Canberra. The squadron reequipped with the Canberra in March 1953 and in August 1954 it relocated to RAF Ahlhorn in West-Germany, where it joined 125 wing of Royal Air Force Germany. The following month it moved again, this time to RAF Gutersloh, where it the unit had its final disbandment two years later on 31 August 1956.

== Aircraft operated ==
Aircraft
From	To	Aircraft	Version(s)
Mar 1918	Aug 1919	Royal Aircraft Factory F.E.2	FE.2b, FE.2d
May 1937	Mar 1939	Handley Page Heyford	I, Ia, II, III
Jan 1939	Dec 1941	Vickers Wellington	I, IA, IC
Nov 1941	Sep 1944	Short Stirling	I, III
Aug 1944	Nov 1949	Avro Lancaster	I, III
Oct 1949	Mar 1950	Avro Lincoln	B.2
Nov 1950	Mar 1953	Boeing Washington	B.1
Apr 1953	Aug 1956	English Electric Canberra	B.2

== See also ==
- List of Royal Air Force aircraft squadrons
