= No. 38 Squadron RAF =

Defunct flying squadron of the Royal Air Force

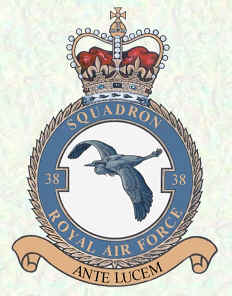
- No. 38 Squadron badge. A heron volant.
- Active: July 1916 – July 1919; September 1935 – March 1967
- Country: United Kingdom
- Branch: Royal Air Force
- Role: Bomber
- Part of: No. 3 Group 1939–1940; No. 205 Group 1940–1942
- Mottos: Latin: Ante lucem ("Before the dawn")
- Battle honours: Home Defence, 1917–1918; Western Front, 1918; Channel & North Sea, 1939; Fortress Europe, 1940; Norway, 1940; France & Low Countries, 1940; Invasion Ports, 1940; Ruhr, 1940; German Ports, 1940; Berlin, 1940; Egypt & Libya, 1940–1942; Malta, 1941; Mediterranean, 1941–1943

Commanders
- Notable commanders: Arthur Harris

No. 38 Squadron of the Royal Air Force was formed in 1916 as a Home Defence and training squadron, before transferring to France in 1918 as a night bomber squadron. Disbanded in 1919, it was reformed in 1935, and was soon equipped with Vickers Wellington bombers, a type that it operated throughout the Second World War. Having operated across the Mediterranean theatre for much of WWII, at the end of hostilities No. 38 Squadron remained in the area, based at Malta, and undertaking maritime reconnaissance and air-sea rescue duties. After operating the Avro Shackleton in these roles for a number of years, the squadron was disbanded in 1967.

== World War I ==
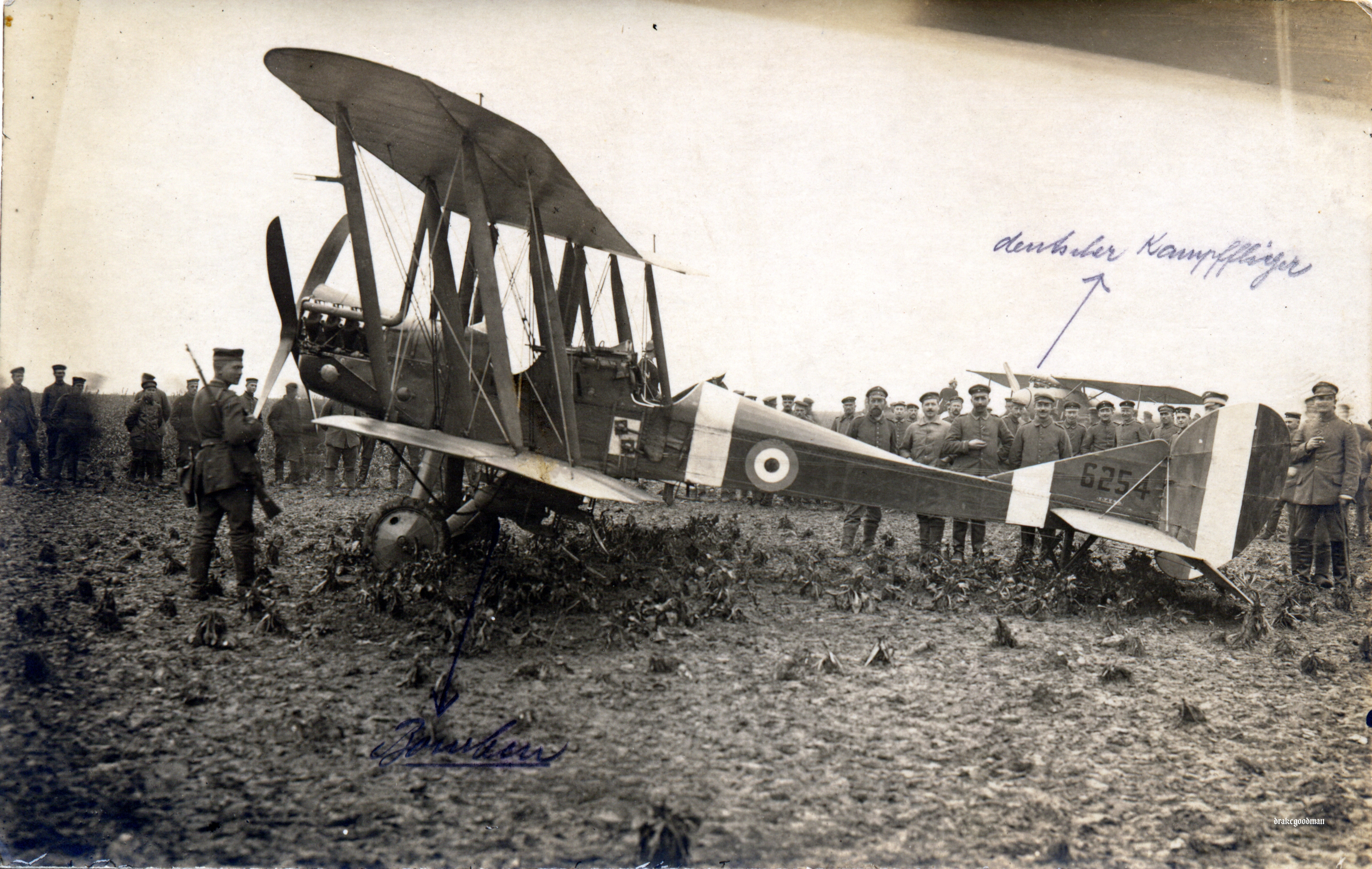
A B.E.2d

No.38 Squadron Royal Flying Corps was originally formed at Thetford in early 1916 and shortly after was re-designated as No.25 (Reserve) training squadron. A new No.38 Squadron was formed at Castle Bromwich in July 1916. It was designated as a Home Defence unit for the West Midlands and equipped with B.E.2c aircraft. In September 1916 the squadron was re-equipped with F.E.2b aircraft and the HQ moved to Melton Mowbray. Operations were undertaken from Stamford, Buckminster and Leadenham involving pilot instruction during the day and air defence against possible attacks from Zeppelins by night. For several months in 1916 the squadron was commanded by Captain A. T. Harris, later to become Air Chief Marshal Arthur Harris, C-in-C, RAF Bomber Command and Marshal of the Royal Air Force.

In May 1918 the squadron with its F.E.2b aircraft was designated as a night bomber squadron and transferred to Dunkirk. In its first raid on 13 June 1918 ten of the squadron's aircraft targeted Ostend docks. Over five months of operations the squadron flew 1,591 hours' made 47 raids, dropping nearly 50 tons of bombs mainly on the German canals, railways, dumps and airfields in Belgium. After returning to England without its aircraft, 38 Squadron was disbanded at RAF Hawkinge on 4 July 1919.

== Reformation ==
In September 1935 the squadron reformed at RAF Mildenhall as a night bomber squadron and was equipped with the Handley Page Heyford. It became one of the first RAF squadrons to re-equip with a monoplane bomber, the Fairey Hendon in November 1936. In 1937 the squadron moved to RAF Marham and in December 1938 received the first of the new Vickers Wellington bombers. It was declared operational on the outbreak of war as a bomber squadron under No. 3 Group. 38 Squadron was one of the few RAF squadrons to use the Wellington from the beginning to the end of the Second World War.

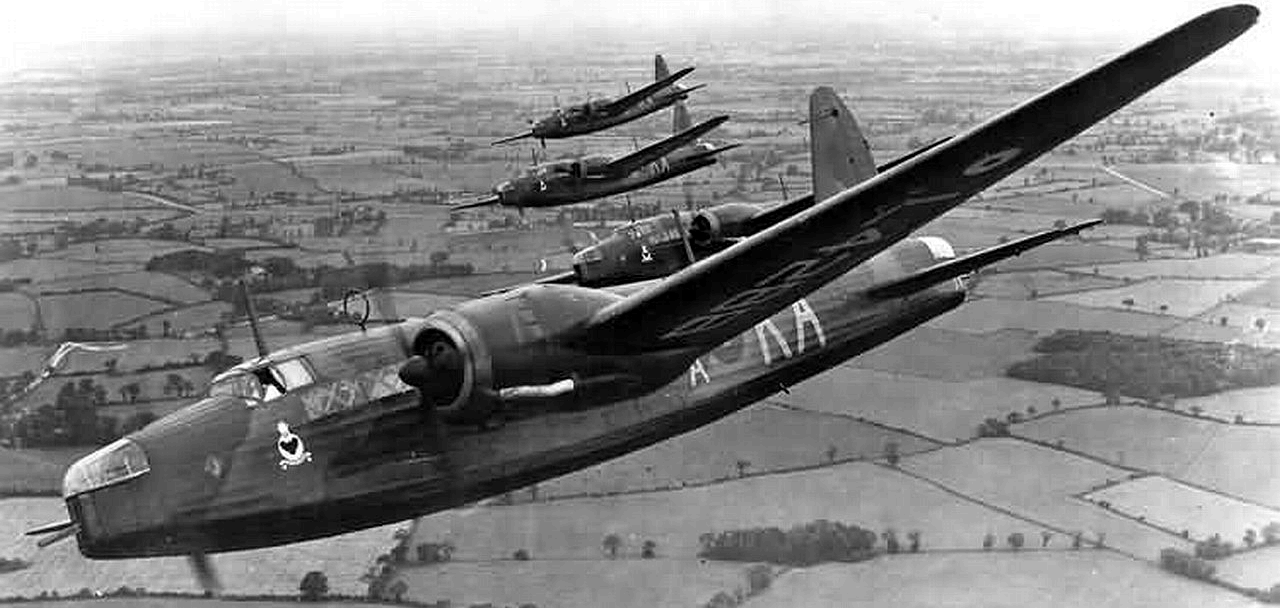

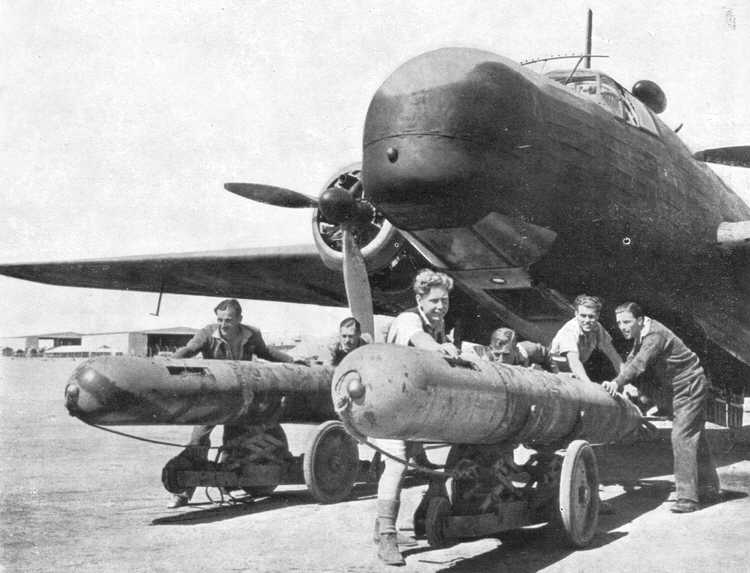

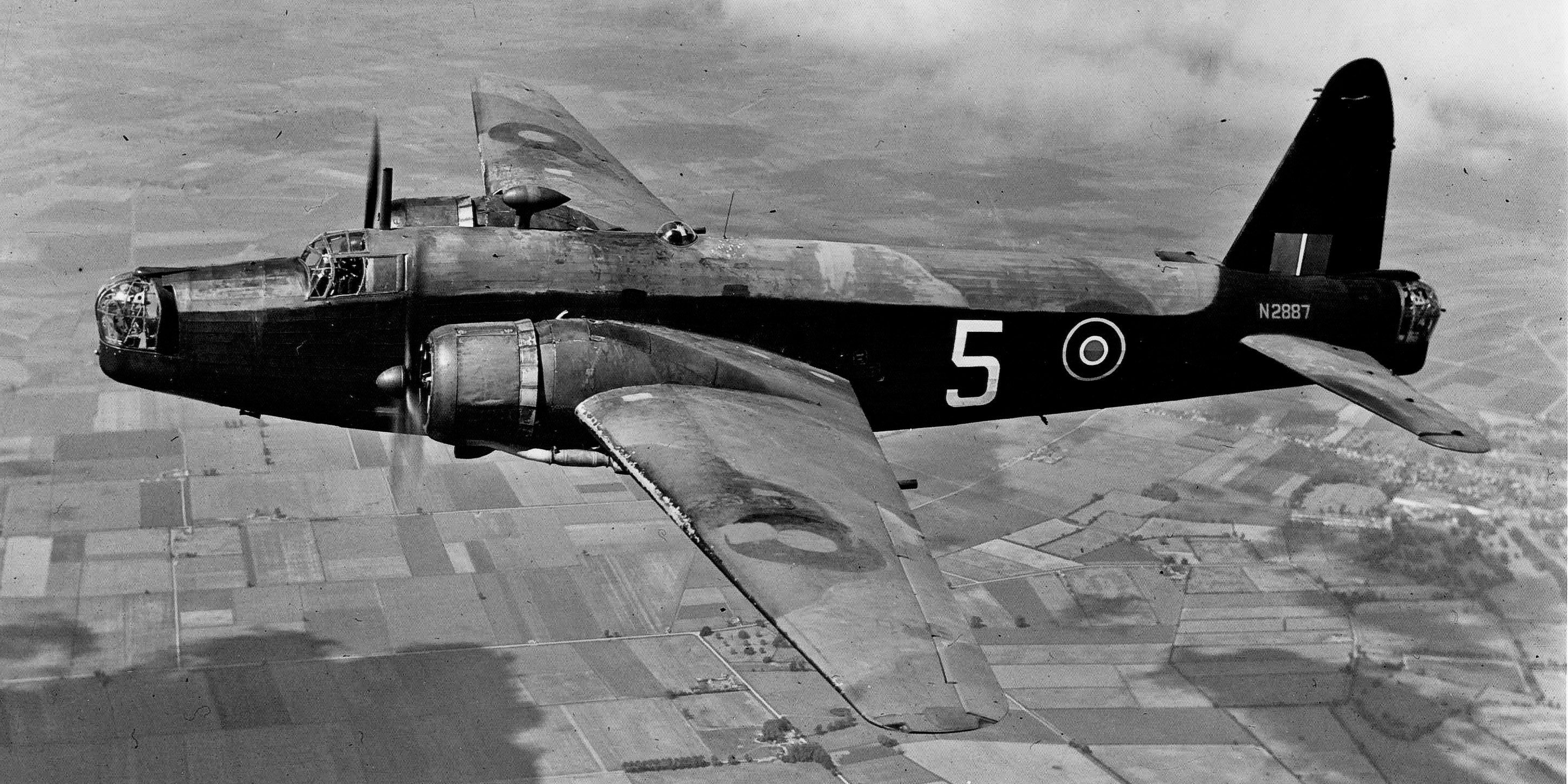

== World War II ==
=== Home service ===
The squadron had a quiet start to the war, flying sorties over the North Sea. It flew its first bombing mission on 3 December 1939, when three of its Wellingtons with aircraft from Nos. 115 and 149 Squadrons made a daylight raid against German warships in the Heligoland area. Although the operation had minimal effect on enemy shipping an enemy fighter was destroyed by rear gunner LAC J. Copley who was subsequently awarded the Distinguished Flying Medal.

On 11 May 1940 the squadron began operations in support of the British Expeditionary Force (BEF). On 30 May 1940 seventeen Wellington Bombers from RAF Marham took off to provide close ground support to the BEF as they withdrew from Dunkirk. Aircraft R 3162 from 38 Squadron was shot down near the town of Veurne (Furnes) in Belgium and the 6-man crew were killed. The co-pilot, Flying Officer Vivian Rosewarne was reported missing, believed killed, on 31 May 1940. His station commander, Group Captain Claude Hilton Keith, found a letter among the missing airman's personal possessions. It had been left open, so that it could be passed by the censor. Group Captain Keith was so moved by the letter that, with the mother's permission, it was anonymously published in The Times on 18 June 1940. It was subsequently published in a small book (An Airman's Letter to His Mother) and reprinted three times. By the end of the year over 500,000 copies had been sold. King George VI wrote personally to the mother. Suggestions that the letter was fictitious and propaganda eventually led to the identification of Flying Officer Rosewarne and his death notice was published on 23 December 1940. In 1941 Michael Powell released a short documentary style British propaganda film of the letter featuring the voice of John Gielgud.

From May 1940 onwards No.38 Squadron continued regular night raids on the Channel ports and the Ruhr and occasionally the squadron flew farther into Germany, reaching as far as Berlin later in the year.

On one raid Squadron Leader Eric Foster, was shot down over the Black Forest on 14/15 June 1940. He escaped German captivity, including in the notorious Spangenberg Castle and Stalag Luft III, seven times, working on several escape tunnels. He was eventually repatriated to the UK by feigning insanity, an act which he felt ashamed about for the rest of his life. On return to the UK he was refused permission to resume flying duties, but went on to be adjutant of RAF Innsworth.

=== Mediterranean theatre ===
In November, No. 38 was withdrawn from operations and despatched to Fayid, Egypt to form a night bomber wing and engage in regular attacks on Italian ports along the North African coast in order to hamper the movement of supplies to the Italian forces in the Western Desert. Further raids took place the Greek islands and Yugoslavia after Germany invaded Greece In January 1942 the squadron became part of No. 201 group engaged in anti-shipping duties and carried out night torpedo attacks on enemy shipping in the Mediterranean from March to October 1942.

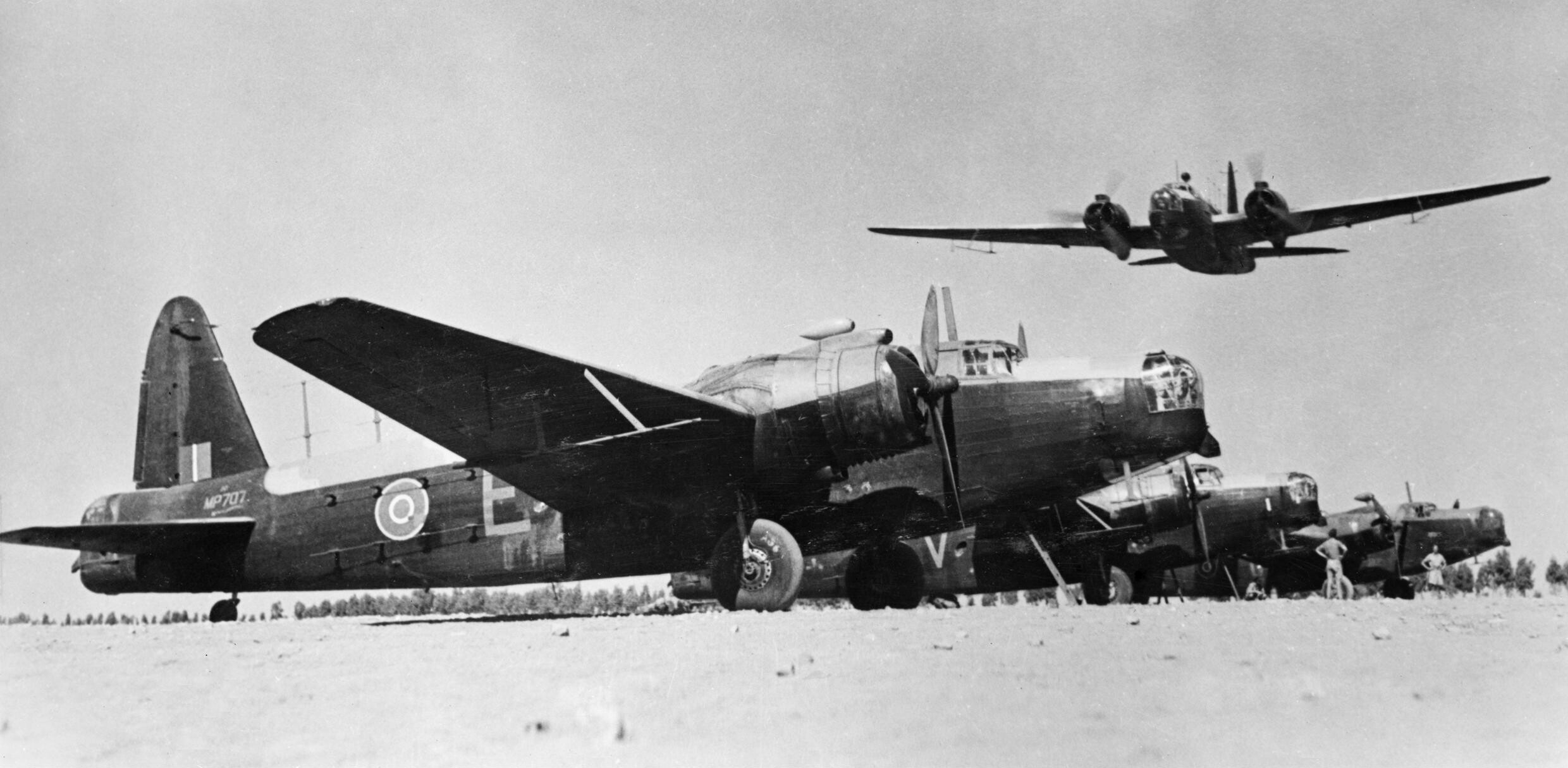
Vickers Wellingtons of No. 38 Squadron lined up at Berka III, Libya

The twin-engined Wellington bomber was still the mainstay of the Middle East night-bomber force. Although slow, unwieldy, and fabric-covered and too vulnerable a target by day, it possessed the necessary long range for night operations. Radar-equipped Wellingtons popularly known as ‘Snoopingtons’ patrolled the shipping lanes throughout the night and using flares to illuminate enemy convoys and directing the strike-Wellingtons, or ‘Torpingtons’ who attacked at sea level. The torpedo had to be released at approximately seventy feet above sea level, and on dark nights pilots sometimes flew into the sea. It was May 1942 when the first successful torpedo attacks were made on a convoy, resulting in two hits and one ship beached. Following the end of Axis resistance in North Africa the squadron focussed on attacking enemy ships and mining along the coasts of Italy and the Balkans.

From January 1943 to December 1944, the squadron was engaged in mine laying, reconnaissance duties and anti-submarine patrols with detachments in Malta, along the Western Desert and in Palestine. No. 38 squadron was equipped with Wellington Mk VIIs with ASV radar (these aircraft became known as 'Goofingtons') and flew hunter-killer teams; the first success in this role occurred on 26 August, when a tanker was found, torpedoed and sunk. On 2 February 1944 Wellington MP582 piloted by Flying Officer Parkes attacked shipping in the Aegean Sea using 4 x500lb bomb one direct hit, ship set on fire.

At the end of 1944, it moved to Greece in a support role for Air operations during the Greek Civil War and then on to southern Italy as part of No. 334 Wing. At first it was used to drop supplies to the Yugoslav Partisans, but in January 1945 the squadron converted to the Wellington XIV and returned to anti-shipping duties, attacking Axis shipping off the coast of northern Italy from then until the end of the war.

== Post World War II ==
In July 1945 No. 38 moved to Malta and became operational with Vickers Warwick on 23 August for maritime reconnaissance and air sea rescue duties. No. 38 then converted to the Avro Lancaster in 1946 and moved to Palestine for eighteen months where they were involved in many long-range patrols over the Mediterranean in support of Royal Navy operations to suppress illegal Jewish immigration to Palestine before returning to Malta. Bill Brooks, founder of Christie's auction house was a pilot in 38 squadron and on 11 May 1947 he was the captain of one of four Lancasters which took 70 suspected Jewish terrorists from Palestine to Nairobi. He was told by his station commander that all log book entries should record "trooping" as the purpose of the trip; his secret orders stated: "Destroy after reading". The squadron continued with reconnaissance and air sea rescue duties, was re-equipped with the Avro Shackleton in 1954 and was based in Malta until 1967. During this time it sent detachments to participate in the Beira patrols during the period of Rhodesian UDI and to the Persian Gulf for an air blockade following the failure of negotiations with regard to the presence of a Saudi Arabian party at Hamasa. No.38 Squadron was disbanded at Hal Far, Malta on 31 March 1967.

The numberplate emerged for the last time as the "shadow" identity of No. 236 Operational Conversion Unit RAF, the conversion unit for the Nimrod maritime patrol aircraft based at RAF St Mawgan in Cornwall. This lasted until the Options for Change review following the Cold War when 236 OCU was disbanded in September 1992 and the Nimrod training role transferred to No. 42 Squadron RAF.

== See also ==
- List of Royal Air Force aircraft squadrons
