= Sherdil =

2019 Pakistani Urdu-language action film

- Theatrical release Poster
- Directed by: Azfar Jafri
- Screenplay by: Nomaan Khan
- Produced by: Nomaan Khan
- Starring: Mikaal Zulfiqar; Armeena Rana Khan; Hassan Niazi; Sabeeka Imam
- Edited by: Rizwan AQ
- Music by: Mustafa Zahid; Soch (Band); Shani Arshad (score)
- Production company: NK Pictures
- Distributed by: ARY Films
- Release date: 22 March 2019
- Country: Pakistan
- Languages: Urdu, English
- Box office: Rs. 12.61 crore (US$450,000)

Sherdil (Urdu: شیر دل "Lionheart") is a 2019 Pakistani aerial combat-war action film produced by NK Pictures. It is written and produced by Nomaan Khan, directed by Azfar Jafri, and stars Mikaal Zulfiqar, Hassan Niazi, Armeena Rana Khan and Sabeeka Imam. The film revolves around Pakistan Air Force. It is the 28th highest-grossing Pakistani film. Sherdil was a commercial success though it received mixed to negative reviews from critics.

== Plot ==
The film opens during the year 1965, where two Pakistani F-86 Sabre fighters are doing a CAP (Combat Air Patrol). Squadron Leader Sikandar and his wingman spot three Indian Folland Gnat fighters flying in Pakistani airspace. The PAF (Pakistan Air Force) planes engage the IAF (Indian Air Force) fighters. Sikandar shoots down 2 Gnats and then has his weapons get jammed. He then heroically gives up his life and crashes his plane into the final enemy jet to save his wingman.

Fast forward to present day, Haris Mustafa (Mikaal Zulfiqar) who is the grandson of Sikandar Mustafa, and his best friend Fawad both dream of becoming fighter pilots. Haris's parents disapprove of his career choice. However, Haris's grandmother, widow of Sikander, is supportive of his ambitions. When Haris is accepted into the PAF academy, his father disowns him. At the academy, Haris and Fawad befriend Harijeet, a Pakistani Sikh. During this time, Haris meets and falls in love with Sabrina (Armeena Khan). Haris is then deployed at the same squadron as his late grandfather, the No. 16 Squadron "Black Panthers".

Two Indian Mirage 2000's enter the Pakistani airspace and Haris and Irfan are scrambled to intercept them in JF-17's. Irfan shoots down one of the Mirages but then has his plane damaged due to the destroyed Mirage's debris and returns to base. Haris then engages in an intense dogfight with the second Mirage, but barely escapes with his life. Haris returns to the base where he learns his grandmother died. Although Haris survived the air encounter, his superiors are disappointed that he almost lost the plane and his life. They reluctantly send him to the International Flight School.

At the flight school, he encounters Flight Lieutenant Arun Veerani, the same Mirage 2000 fighter pilot that he had engaged with earlier. Haris and Arun are initially very hostile to each other, but end up becoming friends.

Haris returns and proposes to Sabrina. She agrees to marry him, but only if he remains with the PAF, as she realizes that she cannot let him give up his dream and passion for serving his country. Their honeymoon is cut short when political tensions once again arise between India and Pakistan, with the Indian armed forces threatening to perform surgical strikes along the Pakistan-controlled Kashmir area. Sabrina is horrified at the risk that Haris's life will be in, but he states that he must do what is required of him, to which she then gives him her full support.

Haris and Irfan are sent on a CAP, when they encounter several Indian Mirage-2000's. One Mirage is shot down and another is damaged and leaves the area. During the ensuing fight, Haris comes face to face with a Mirage flown by Arun. Haris hesitates to shoot Arun due to their friendship, and then hears a distress call from his wingman Irfan, who is now being shot at by another Mirage. Haris spares Arun, telling him to leave the area and flies towards Irfan, but is too late. Irfan is shot down by the Mirage and Haris in turn shoots the Mirage down. Arun then returns who tells Haris that this decision is "out of his hands" and tries to shoot Haris down. Haris comes up behind him, says "Sorry my friend" and shoots Arun's plane down. Upon his return, Haris is greeted by all the PAF ground personnel and his superiors and finds that Irfan has survived as well. To his surprise, his father is there to receive him too and is very proud of the way his son defended his country. Arun is then shown at the end of the film, survived by having ejected and now stranded in Pakistan territory.

== Cast ==
- Mikaal Zulfiqar as Flt Lt Harris Mustafa
- Hassan Niazi as Flt Lt Arun Verani
- Armeena Khan as Sabrina Harris Mustafa
- Sabeeka Imam as Sarah Francis, Arun's fiancée
- Samina Ahmad as Harris's grandmother
- Laila Zuberi as Harris's mother

== Release ==
The film was released on 22 March 2019.

=== Home media ===
The film had a television premier on Eid al-Adha, on 3 August 2020, on ARY Digital.

== Reception ==
=== Box office ===
Sherdil collected around 11.5 million on the first day, adding 17 million and 13 million on Saturday and Sunday, respectively, reaching up to 41.5 million by the end of opening weekend. After 17 days it collected 95.0 million. As of May 2019, the film has collected 115.3 million locally and 19.75 million from overseas for a total of 126.1 million worldwide.

=== Critical response ===
Azfar Jafri of Galaxy Lollywood gave the film 2.5/5 star. While criticizing the poor writing and direction of the film, he praised the visuals and action sequences.

Rahul Aijaz of Express Tribune rated it 1/5 stars and commented "Sherdil simply lacks emotion from beginning to end. You might walk in to the cinema hall excited but you’ll walk out indifferent".

== Soundtrack ==
The music of the film is composed by Soch (band).

Track listing
No.	Title	Singer(s)	Length
1.	"Sanson Ma Baki Ha Dum"	Mustafa Zahid	3.33
2.	"Ho Janiya"	Soch and Sana Zulfiqar	3.10
3.	"kuri Da Jhumka"	Soch	3.07
4.	"Yaro Aaj Raat"	Soch, Seher khan and Umar Imtiaz	2.58
5.	"Haris Theme"	Soch, Rabi Ahmad	0.52
6.	"Arun Theme"	Soch, Rabi Ahmad	1.18
7.	"Tum He Sa Ay Mujahido"	Vital Signs & Soch	4.50

== Sequel ==
On 29 October 2019, Dawn News reported that writer and producer Noman Khan has confirmed a sequel is in the works. According to Khan, the sequel will have an all-new cast.

== See also ==
- Sher Dil (Pakistani film)
- List of Pakistani films of 2019
