= Emaan (TV series) =

- Written by: Zafar Mairaj
- Directed by: Adnan Wai Qureshi
- Starring: Ahsan Khan; Hassan Niazi; Syed Jibran; Munawar Saeed; Anna Liko
- Opening theme: Rahat Fateh Ali Khan
- Country of origin: Pakistan
- Original language: Urdu
- No. of episodes: 18

Production
- Producers: Abdullah Kadwani; Asad Qureshi; Humayun Saeed
- Cinematography: Nadeem Ahmed
- Editor: Asad Ahmed
- Production company: 7th Sky Entertainment

Original release
- Network: Express Entertainment
- Release: May 2012 – September 2012

Emaan is a Pakistani television serial written by Zafar Mairaj, and aired on Express Entertainment in 2012. The leading cast includes Ahsan Khan, Hassan Niazi, Syed Jibran, Munawar Saeed and Ukrainian model and actress Anna Liko in the titular role. The plot revolves around a boy from Karachi who befriends an American girl online, hoping to use the relationship to get a green card.

== Plot ==
A middle-class unemployed Karachi boy, Aazi, befriends an American girl, Kathy, through the internet at the internet cafe of his friend, Sajid. They eventually fall in love, and Kathy decides to come to Pakistan because of her fascination with the Eastern family value system. Aazi, however, sees her as an opportunity to obtain a green card. Sajid helps him in this regard, hoping to shift there once Aazi had gone. Aazi's entire family is excited about Kathy's arrival and lends him a helping hand. His sister-in-law, Bushra, is especially excited and even learns to speak English. However, Aazi's father, Rooh Ullah, is unhappy because Aazi has made changes without consulting him. This leads Rooh Ullah to leave the house and move to retirement home.

Kathy's plan to come to Pakistan is initially cancelled, but she eventually arrives a day later. Upon her arrival, Kathy turns out to be sweet and pleasant toward everyone and surprises the family by speaking Urdu. All the family members, along with Sajid and his wife, Naheed, shower Kathy with affection and give her special treatment.

Despite passing a few days, Kathy mentions nothing about her marriage plan, which makes Aazi worried. He eventually asks her about her decision of the marriage, and Kathy refuses to change her religion, contrary to their previous understanding, saying that she needs some time. Fearing that Aazi might change his religion, Aazi's mother, Razia, brings Rooh Ullah back home. Rooh Ullah returns home and develops a strong bond with Kathy. He makes everyone understand that if Aazi and Kathy are willing to marry while maintaining their respective religions, there is nothing wrong with it, as Islam also permits such a marriage.

Aazi and Sajid's childhood friend and neighbour, Abdus Salam, whom they also called as Molvi as he is an Imam in the neighborhood mosque, becomes involved in a difficult situation when Aazi's former girlfriend, Sumbul, elopes from her home because of Aazi. However, Aazi refuses to accept her. Abdus Salam takes her to the hospital after she becomes unconscious and later takes her to his house because she has nowhere else to go. She introduces her as Noor-ul-Huda, claiming to be a member of a Tablighi Jamaat. Her presence in the neighborhood worries Aazi, as he fears that she might tell Kathy about their past relationship.

Preparations for Aazi and Kathy's wedding begin, and the insolvent Aazi make Kathy pay for the wedding expenses with the help of Sajid and Naheed. When Rooh Ullah learns about this, he forbids Aazi from using Kathy's money and orders him to return it to her. He announces to bear all the wedding expenses because he considers Kathy to be like his own daughter. He takes Bushra and Kathy shopping for Kathy's wedding. On their return, he goes to the mosque to offer his prayer. At the same time, a bomb blast occurs there. Everyone becomes worried about Rooh Ullah and Molvi, who were both in the mosque. Fortunately, both of them are safe. However, Rooh Ullah returns home and reveals that a child died as a result of the attack. Kathy is deeply disturbed by the blast and is unable to sleep that night. She discusses her fears with Rooh Ullah, and decide to postpone the wedding ceremony. Aazi initially hesitates, but eventually agrees when Rooh Ullah explains the situation to him. As the ceremony is postponed, Kathy tells Rooh Ullah that she wants to embrace Islam because she has been inspired by him. Rooh Ullah asks her whether anyone is forcing her to make the decision, but Kathy assures him that she is making the decision wholeheartedly and for herself. The Maiyun and Henna ceremonies begin. During the celebrations, Kathy announces to everyone that she has embraced Islam and has taken the name Emaan. All the guests and neighbors congratulate her.

Meanwhile, Sumbul's frequent visits to Aazi's house during the wedding ceremonies worry him. He plans with Sajid to find a solution to the problem. They pressure Molvi to go to Sumbul's parents and tell them that their daughter is at his home and he had merely given her shelter. However, when Molvi reaches her family, he learns that Sumbul's father died of a brain hemorrhage shortly after she left the house. After the failure of the plan, Sajid and Aazi force Molvi to throw Sumbul out of her house, but he blatantly refuses, saying that although he had previously considered their friendship, they are now crossing all limits by rendering her homeless.

Aazi feels even worse when Emaan tells him that she has decided to stay with his family in Pakistan and will not return to her country. Aazi, who had taken loans to cover the expenses of the marriage, gets into further trouble when he is unable to repay the loans he had taken from Sajid and other people. Sajid's behaviour also changes when he learns that Aazi is unable to repay his loan.

Molvi visits Sumbul's family along with her after she learns about her father's death through a newspaper. However, her brother refuses to accept her, and she and Molvi eventually return. Molvi tells her mother that Sumbul's family has died in an accident and that she will now live with them permanently.

Sajid convinces Aazi that Emaan's behaviour has changed because of his father, who constantly teaches her about religious teachings and values. With hatred for his father in his heart, Aazi pushes him during an argument over his closeness with Emaan. He eventually leaves the house and shifts back to the old house. Bushra and Emaan try to make him realise his mistake, but he does not care, citing his grief of not being able to move to the United States.

After Rooh Ullah leaves for the old house, Emaan also follows him. Rooh Ullah's friend in the old house, Pasha, brings them to his house so that they can live there peacefully. However, Rooh Ullah begins to ignore Emaan so that she will return to the house. She eventually decides to return when Rooh Ullah makes her realise that if Aazi married her out of greed for going to the United States, then she also had her own form of greed, the desire for a family.

Meanwhile, Aazi's fights with the lenders become a routine occurrence. When the lenders begin fighting with him at his door and demanding their money, Raazi throws Aazi out of the house. Emaan returns and learns that he has been thrown out. She calls him, but his mobile phone is stolen at that very moment. When she learns about the loan he had taken, she clears his debts and appeals to him to return through an advertisement in the newspaper. Many days pass, but the police are also unable to find him.

Sumbul's brother comes to Molvi's house to shoot Sumbul in an honour killing attempt, but Molvi saves her. After some time, he wishes to marry Sumbul. Sumbul accepts the proposal when she realises that he genuinely wants her to be his life partner. They eventually get married.

Two weeks later, Sajid receives information and takes the family to the hospital to identify a dead body, but it turns out to be someone else. Sajid and Naheed remark that those who try to fly on someone else's land may end up losing even what they already have. On their return from the hospital, Emaan sees Aazi sitting on the roadside in torn clothes and in a miserable condition. He becomes frightened upon seeing her and begins to run, repeatedly saying that he will not go to America. Rooh Ullah and Raazi arrive there, and Aazi embraces Rooh Ullah's legs while crying.

== Cast ==
- Anna Liko as Kathy/ Emaan
- Ahsan Khan as Aazi Ullah
- Farhan Ally Agha as Raazi Ullah: Aazi's elder brother
- Sabreen Hisbani as Bushra: Raazi's wife
- Munawar Saeed as Rooh Ullah: Aazi and Raazi's father
- Samina Ahmad as Razia, Aazi and Raazi's father
- Hassan Niazi as Sajid: Aazi's best friend and neighbour
- Amna Karim as Naheed, Sajid's wife
- Syed Jibran as Abdus Salam/ "Molvi" as called by his friends: the Imam of the neighborhood mosque and Aazi and Sajid's friend and neighbour
- Zaheen Tahira as Kahir-un-Nisa: Abdus Salam's mother
- Mehak Ali as Sakina: Aazi and Raazi's sister
- Rashid Farooqui as Iqbal: Sakina's husband
- Fazal Hussain as Faisal: Raazi and Bushra's son
- Arisha as Sara: Raazi and Bushra's daughter
- Natasha Ali as Sumbul/ Noorul Huda: Aazi's former girlfriend
- Mustafa Qureshi as Pasha: Rooh Ullah's friend
- Farah Nadir as Najma: Iqbal's second wife
- Fouzia Mushtaq as Sumbul's mother
- Farhad Fareed as Samraiz: Sumbul's brother

== Reception ==
In a review of the first episode published in The Express Tribune, the reviewer Sahar Habib found the episode "well-written" and opined that the episode was "much better than expected" as first episodes can be bit slow. In a review of the second episode, the reviewer noted the "religious aspects subtly woven into the episodes" and further wrote that she was pleasantly surprised by the comedy. While reviewing the episodes 4–6, the reviewer opined, "Sometimes you can get away with an average plot if you have a good script with witty dialogues and good pacing. “Emaan” has all of the above, in addition to the fresh plot."

=== Awards and nominations ===
Year	Award	Category	Nominee	Result	Ref(s)
2013	Pakistan Media Awards	Best Drama Actor	Ahsan Khan	Nominated	
2013	Pakistan Media Awards	Best Drama Supporting Actor	Syed Jibran	Nominated	
