= RAF Buckminster =

Former RAF base in Leicestershire, England

RAF Buckminster ~~RFC Buckminster~~
- Near Buckminster, Leicestershire in England

Site information
- Type: Royal Air Force station
- Owner: Air Ministry (1918–1919); The Air Board (1916–1918)
- Operator: Royal Air Force 1918–1919; Royal Flying Corps (1916–1918)

Location
- Shown within Leicestershire
- Coordinates: 52°48′00″N 000°40′27″W
- Area: 125 acres (51 ha)

Site history
- Built: 1916
- In use: 1916–1919

Airfield information
- Elevation: 146 metres (479 ft) AMSL
Runways
| Direction | Length and surface |
|---|---|
| 00/00 | Grass |

Royal Air Force Buckminster or more simply RAF Buckminster is a former Royal Flying Corps and Royal Air Force station 2.25 miles (3.62 km) west of Colsterworth, Lincolnshire and 9.3 miles (15 km) north-east of Melton Mowbray, Leicestershire, England.

== History ==
The base was active during the First World War, firstly with a flight of No. 38 Squadron RFC initially with the Royal Aircraft Factory B.E.12 between 1 October 1916 and November 1916 before returning on 25 May 1918 with the FE 2B & 2D versions of the Royal Aircraft Factory F.E.2. The squadron had detachments at Leadenham and Stamford Aerodromes until the squadron moved to Cappelle on 31 May 1918 however the squadron depot stayed here at Buckminster until 14 August 1918 when it became No. 90 Squadron RAF. The new 90 Squadron was similar to 38 Squadron since it had detachments at Leadenham and Stamford Aerodromes with the same FE 2B fighters however during September 1918 this changed when the squadron regrouped at Buckminster and was re-equipped with the Avro 504K(NF). The squadron then disbanded on 13 June 1919 here at Buckminster.

The airfield then became home to an Aircraft Acceptance Park which closed in 1919 when the aerodrome was closed.

== Present day ==
There is no sign of the base today, with the site being given back over to agriculture.

== See also ==
- List of former Royal Air Force stations
