= Asad Shan =

Entertainer

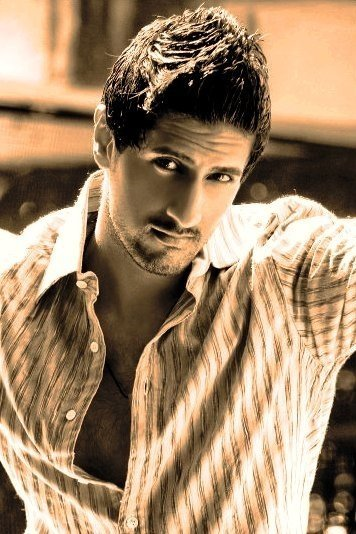
- Asad Shan
- Born: Asad Shan; London, England, UK
- Occupations: Actor, Filmmaker, TV Presenter and Real Estate Investor.
- Years active: 2012–present
- Website: http://www.asadshan.com

Asad Shan is a British actor, fashion model, TV presenter, and producer/director. He was formerly an investment banker, having worked for RBS (ABN AMRO) and HSBC. He was crowned Mr. Asia UK, beating 20 contestants in the process. The film 7 Welcome to London was both his acting and directorial debut. It received critical and commercial acclaim after its UK release and has gone on to become the most successful British-made Hindi language film in the UK.
Shan's other notable appearances include being a veejay for B4U Music, and he is currently on Zee TV's Zing as a host for the weekend film show Brits Bollywood, as well as the daily rude tube show, Grinds My Teeth. Shan has starred in many New York Film Academy productions, and Lee Strasberg Theatre Institute productions of the well-renowned East is East and The Glass Menagerie. He has recently endorsed campaigns for major brands like Sky Digital, HSBC, and most recently One for the Boys, a charity chaired by Samuel L. Jackson.

== Early life ==
Asad was born in London. His grandparents moved to London from Kashmir in the 1940s. He studied at Brentwood School in Essex. He then studied law and management at university. Asad grew up supporting West Ham F.C. and is an avid tennis and football player.

== Career ==
Upon graduating with a degree in law and management, he worked as an investment banker in the city of London for two years in Corporate Broking and ECM. Asad won the Mr. Asia UK competition and inspired by this win, he went to New York to train in method acting at the Lee Strasberg Theatre Institute and in Film Performance at the New York Film Academy. he then moved from the Big Apple to Mumbai, India to begin work in Bollywood.

Within a few months after his move to Mumbai he was seen on the runways at Indian Fashion Week as well as being an ambassador for top fashion labels and eventually became one of the most sought-after veejays for B4U Music. In 2009 he was named the 'Best & Sexiest VJ' at the music channel. He fronted popular shows like "Just Request", "Star Stop", "Flash" and "India's Top Ten".

Eventually seeing an opportunity and growth in the UK market, Asad shifted his base back to London from Bombay where he started a film production company Iconic Productions UK Limited. He worked on the company's debut venture, a Bollywood thriller film titled 7 Welcome to London. He played Jai in the starring role. The film was set in London and had a UK-wide release on 9 March 2012.

In the 2016 film London Life, he played the protagonist Raj. The English film is set in London and is about Indian students who migrate to the UK and the problems they face.

Since 2011, he is UK's most popular & recognised face on Zee TV's music channel Zing as a host for Brits Bollywood and UK's first Asian Rude Tube show " Grinds My Teeth" which has gathered a huge response in the UK Shan has hosted a daily request show Rock The Vibe in the past for Zing.

Asad also dabbled as a creative producer for the Black Arts company in Soho London and has been the creator and host of "The Film Show" on Zing TV from 2015 to 2018, which is an Iconic production, and commissioned by Zee TV.

Asad started filming his first drama serial called "Aabgeenay" written by Qaisra Hayat and directed by Nadeem Siddique. This shoot started in Karachi in 2018 and after 70% of shoot, it was put on hold due to the ceasing of production house.

2023 saw Asad make a special appearance in An Action Hero ( Netflix ) and 2024 saw the release of Tell me about it on Amazon Prime, where Asad plays the lead role. Currently Asad is writing his next directional feature.

2024 saw the release of Asad's next feature role, Tell me about it. This British feature film was set in Bradford. Directed by British Pakistani film director Suman Hanif, it had its grand premiere at the Bradford Science Museum and is streaming on Amazon Prime Video.

== Personal life ==
Asad plays tennis at the UK county level. He loves outdoor sports and is a keen hiker. He loves foreign cinema especially French and South Korean.

== Filmography ==
Year	Film	Role	Production	Director	Notes
2005	The Waiter	Raju	Les Beauchistes/O2 Mobiles	Nilesh Patel	
2005	The Room Mate	Jay	New York Film Academy	Ruchir Garg	
2005	What If	Tom	New York Film Academy	Chung K. Park	
2006	Ya Ali	Self/ Model	Kunika Lal	Kabir Sadanand	Music Video
2008	Never Ending Story	Sunny	Kala Ghoda Film Festival	Ranjeeta Kaur	
2010	Manali Cream	Kal	B3 Productions	Navdeep Khandola	
2012	7 Welcome to London	Jai	Iconic Productions UK Ltd.	Asad Shan	
2017	London Life	Raj	Kaybee Pictures	Naveen Medaram	Post Production
2022	An Action Hero	Imaad	Yellow Colour Films / T series	Anirudh Iyer	Released worldwide / Netflix
2023	Tell me about it	Kidnapper	Pageful Productions	Suman Hanif	Post Production

== Theatre productions ==
Year	Play	Role	Production	Director
2005	The Individual	Ray	CPS Stage London	
2005	Talking With Angels	Jason	CPS Stage London	
2005	The Glass Menagerie	Jim O'Conner	New York Film Academy	
2005	In God We Trust	Joe	NYFC	Lee Strafford
2005	East Is East	Tariq	NYFA Theatre	John Stafford

== Television ==
Year	Title	Role	Production
2005	The Salon	Self/ Mr. Asia UK	Channel 4
2007	BBC Desi DNA	Self	BBC Asia
2008	Brits Abroad	Self	Current TV
2007–08	Express, Star Stop	Vj Asad	B4U Music
2008	GPL	Self	MTV India
2010–2015	Brits Bollywood	Vj Asad	Zing (TV channel)
2013–2014	Grinds My Teeth	Vj Asad	Zing (TV channel)
2015–2016	Zing JukeBox	Vj Asad	Zing (TV channel)
2018	Aabgeenay	Shahzad	GEO TV (TV channel)
2015–2018	The Film Show	Vj Asad	Zing (TV channel)

== Commercials ==
Year	Advertisement	Role	Production
2006	Glow & Lovely Men's Active	Model	Glow & Lovely
2006	Ayurveda Body Butter Cream	Model	Ayurveda
2007	Škoda Octavia	Model	Škoda Octavia
2007	Hero Honda	Model	Hero Honda
2010	LG F1	Man	Th2ng, Nick Meikle
2010	William Hill	Silent Terrace Man	The Bank Film Company, Ian Cassie
2012–present	Sky (UK and Ireland)	Model	Sky (UK and Ireland)
2020	World Remit International	Model	World Remit International
2022	Ford Securialert	Model	Ford Motor Company

== Modelling ==
Year	Designer/Show	Notes
2005–06	London Fashion Week	Ramp Model
2006-08	Wills Lifestyle India Fashion Week	Ramp Model
2006-08	Lakme India Fashion Week	Ramp Model
2007-08	Options	Brand Ambassador
2007–08	Boy London	Brand Ambassador
2007	Matrix Hair Model Fashion Show	Model
2008	Indian Contemporary & Classic Couture	Model
2008	Roberto Cavalli	Model
2008	Kiran Gidwani	Model

== See also ==
- List of British actors
