= No. 90 Squadron RAF =

Defunct flying squadron of the Royal Air Force

- Active: 8 October 1917 - 29 July 1918; 14 August 1918 - 13 June 1919; 15 March 1937 - 6 April 1940; 3 May 1941 - 10 February 1942; 7 November 1942 - 1 September 1950; 4 October 1950 - 1 May 1956; 1 January 1957 – 1 March 1965
- Country: United Kingdom
- Branch: Royal Air Force
- Motto: Latin: Celer ("Swift")

Insignia
- Squadron badge heraldry: A hind salient. The Hind - "representative of vigilance and great speed" - commemorates the fact that, at one time, the squadron was equipped with Hind aircraft.
- Squadron Codes: TW Oct 1938 - Sep 1939; WP May 1941 - Sep 1950, Oct 1950 - Apr 1951; XY Mar 1943 - Oct 1944 carried by 'C' Flt only

No. 90 Squadron RAF (sometimes written as No. XC Squadron) is a squadron of the Royal Air Force.

== History ==
=== World War I ===
No. 90 Squadron was formed as a fighter squadron of the Royal Flying Corps at Shawbury in Shropshire on 8 October 1917, moving to Shotwick in North Wales on 5 December 1917. It was equipped with a variety of types, including the Avro 504, Royal Aircraft Factory F.E.2b, together with a number of Sopwith Pups. The squadron was intended to equip with the new Sopwith Dolphin fighter, and was intended to become operational in France in the spring of 1918, but although it received a few Dolphins in July 1918, it disbanded at Brockworth, Gloucestershire on 3 August 1918 without becoming operational.

The squadron reformed on 14 August 1918 at RAF Buckminster, Leicestershire as a Home Defence squadron equipped with Avro 504Ks with the mission of defending the Midlands against German air attack. Flights of Avro 504s were based at Buckminster, Leadenham and Wittering, and a detachment at Swinstead, but the squadron saw no action, disbanding on 13 June 1919.

=== World War II ===
No. 90 Squadron reformed at RAF Bicester on 15 March 1937 from a flight of 101 Squadron, as a light bomber squadron equipped with Hawker Hind biplanes as its initial equipment. It replaced its Hinds with the more modern Bristol Blenheim twin-engined monoplane from May that year. It replaced its Blenheim Is with Blenheim Mark IVs in early 1939, and on the outbreak of the Second World War, became a training squadron, training Blenheim crews for the rest of Bomber Command. It disbanded on 4 April 1940 when it merged with No. 35 Squadron to become part of No. 17 OTU.

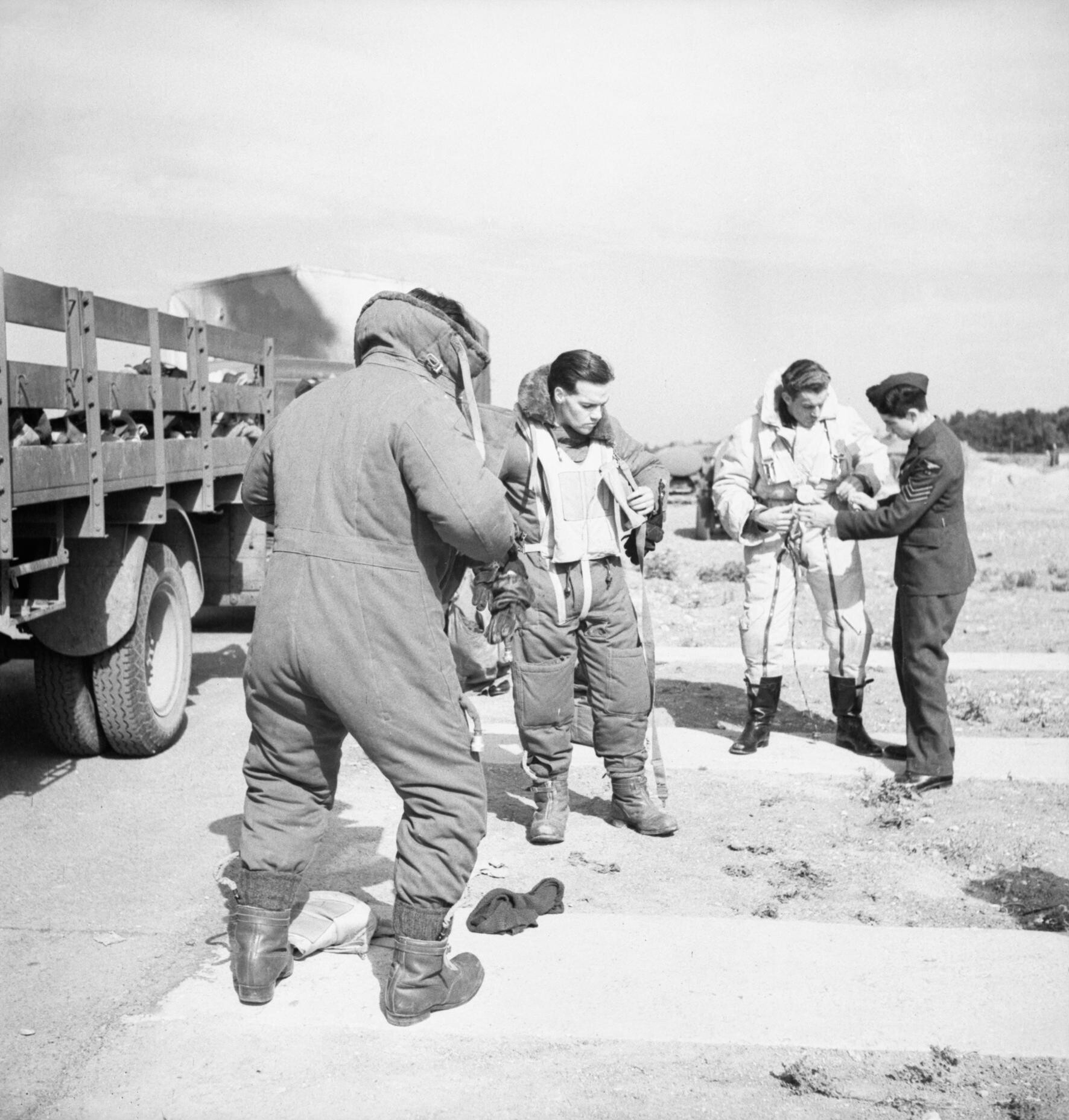
90 Squadron Fortress crew at RAF Polebrook before an attack on the German battleship Gneisenau at Brest, France

The squadron reformed once more at RAF Watton on 7 May 1941 as Bomber Command's only unit equipped with the American Boeing Fortress I four-engined heavy bomber, moving to West Raynham on 15 May. 90 Squadron flew its first operational mission on 8 July 1941, when three Fortresses set off from RAF Polebrook to attack Wilhelmshaven (although only two of them actually managed to bomb the target). The squadron typically flew small formations of Fortresses in high altitude daylight attacks, taking part in a large scale attack on the German battleship Gneisenau at Brest, France on 24 July. Three Fortresses attacked were to attack from 30,000 ft (9,100 m), with the objective of drawing German fighters away from 18 Handley Page Hampdens attacking at lower altitudes. A larger force of 79 Vickers Wellingtons would attack later, while the fighters were meant to be refuelling. The operation did not work as expected, with No. 90 Squadron's Fortresses being unopposed, with the German defenders concentrating on the Hampdens and Wellingtons, shooting down two and ten respectively. Small scale attacks continued, with four Fortresses attacking the German "pocket battleship" Admiral Scheer at Oslo harbour on 8 September, losing two of their number to German fighters. 90 Squadron flew its final operational mission over northern Europe on 25 September 1941. In 51 operational sorties, 25 were abandoned due to faults with the aircraft, with 50 tons of bombs being dropped, of which only about 1 ton hit the intended targets. The Fortress I was unsuitable for the type of very high-altitude operations by small formations on which the RAF used them. Four aircraft were dispatched to Egypt in November for operations in support of the Western Desert Campaign, with the two survivors becoming a detachment of 220 Squadron in December. No. 90 Squadron surrendered its remaining Fortresses to 220 Squadron in February 1942, with the squadron flying a few Blenheims until it disbanded on 14 February 1942.

On 7 November 1942 the Squadron again reformed as a night bomber squadron, part of No. 3 (Bomber) Group, at RAF Bottesford. It was to be equipped with the Short Stirling Mk.I, receiving its first Stirling on 1 December and moving to RAF Ridgewell on 29 December 1942. Its first operational venture were mining sorties on 8 January 1943.

The months following saw the Stirling Mk.III (an improved version) introduced to the Squadron, which moved to RAF Wratting Common on 31 May 1943. As a three-flight unit, the squadron was capable of providing 24 aircraft to the Group's Operational Battle Order, with a further six aircraft held in immediate reserve, and a total of 33 crews. The unit's resources were thrown into the Battle of the Ruhr and sent to many of the German targets that were most heavily defended, including Berlin. The Squadron suffered considerable losses over an eight-month period and found it difficult to maintain reserves of men and machines.

The Stirlings suffered from deficiencies in design, due to restrictions laid down in the original Air Ministry specifications. After suffering heavy proportionate losses by type, their operations were restricted to Special Duties i.e.: Dropping sea mines, low level supply dropping to the Maquis, shorter bombing raids on invasion objectives. The Squadron was active on all these fronts.

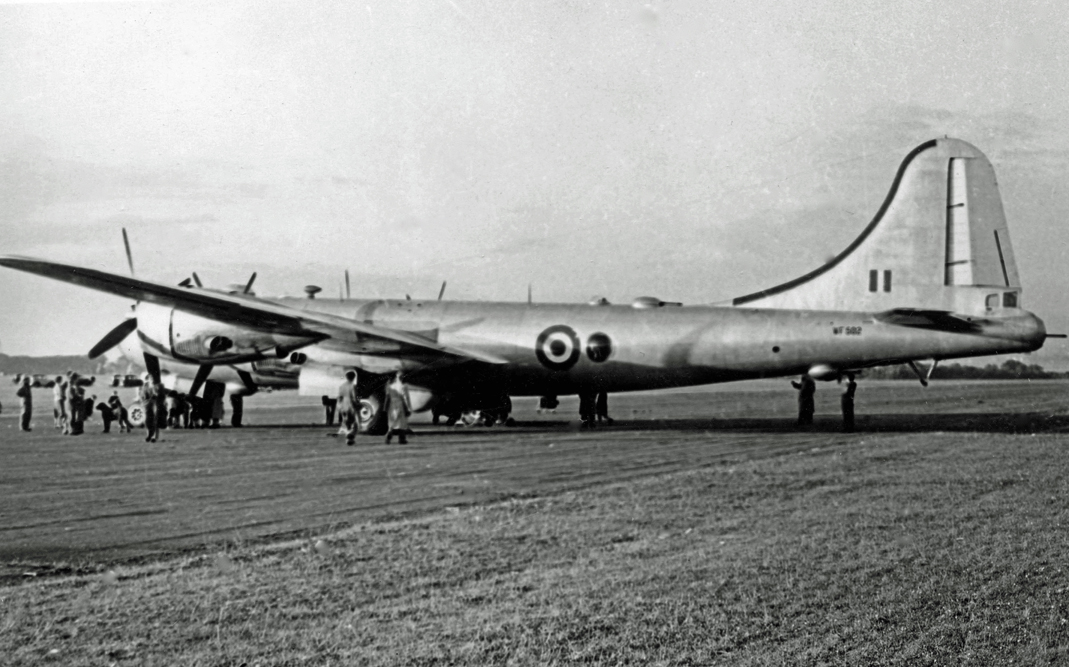
Washington B.1 WF502 of 90 Squadron in September 1952

By June 1944 the Squadron had been declared operational on Lancasters.

The last raid was to Bremen on 22 April 1945. No. 90 Squadron flew 4,613 operational sorties for Bomber Command during the war and lost 86 aircraft.

Several books have been written about 90 Squadron airmen. One was an autobiography by Robert E. Wannop DFC, called 'Chocks Away.' Another was a biography of Wannop's tail gunner (James Cyril McCaffery), called 'Dad's War: The Story of a Courageous Canadian Youth who flew with Bomber Command.' It was written by McCaffery's son, Dan McCaffery. Robert E. Wannop and James McCaffery flew 22 operations together. They arrived at Tuddenham on Christmas Eve 1944 and were still there when the war ended. A third book is an autobiography by Ron James 'I Was One of the Brylcreem Boys'.

=== Postwar ===
The squadron continued to operate the Lancaster in the post-war Bomber Command until May 1947 when the squadron re-equipped with Lincolns. It carried out regular detachments from Wyton to Egypt and Rhodesia before it disbanded on 1 September 1950.

No. 90 Squadron reformed postwar at RAF Marham on 4 October 1950 and was equipped with the B-29 Superfortress, known as the Boeing Washington B.1 in RAF service.

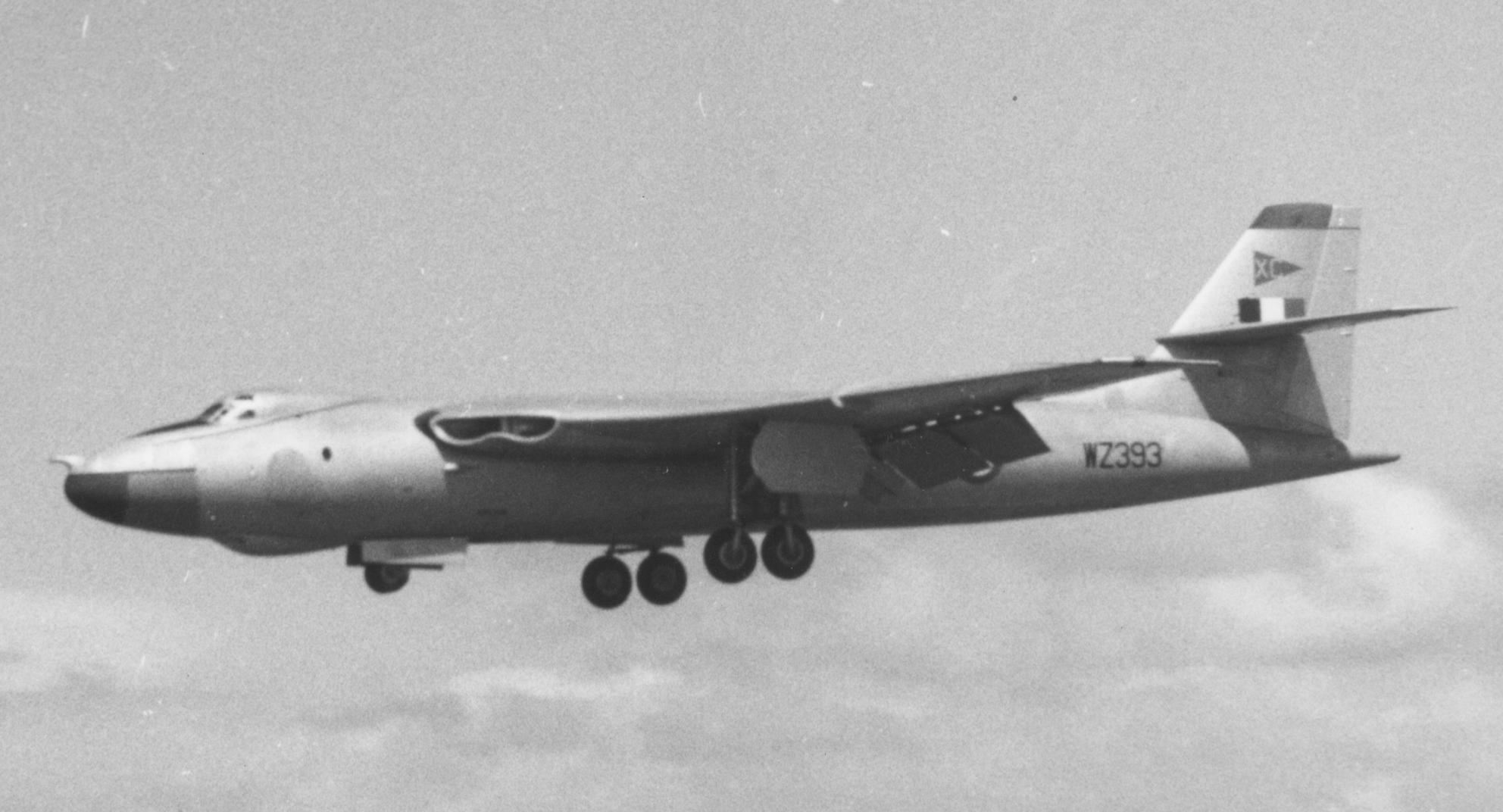
Vickers Valiant B(PR)K.1 of 90 Squadron in 1957 wearing the Squadron's XC symbol in a triangle on its fin

On 8 January 1953 a Washington from the squadron WF502 mysteriously crashed near Llanarmon-yn-Ial in Denbighshire with the loss of all 10 crewmen, it had flown into the ground at night.

In November 1953 the squadron began re-equipping with Canberras. The squadron was disbanded on 1 May 1956.

On 1 January 1957, No. 90 Squadron was reformed at RAF Honington as a V-Bomber squadron, receiving Vickers Valiants from March that year. The squadron started to convert to an in-flight refueling mission in August 1961, becoming a dedicated tanker unit on 1 April 1962 when it officially lost its bomber role. Structural problems with the Valiant fleet caused by metal fatigue resulted in the RAF's Valiant fleet being permanently grounded on 26 January 1965, the squadron finally disbanding on 16 April 1965.
