= Brentwood School, Essex =

Public school in Essex, England

Coordinates: 51°37′13″N 0°18′25″E

Brentwood School

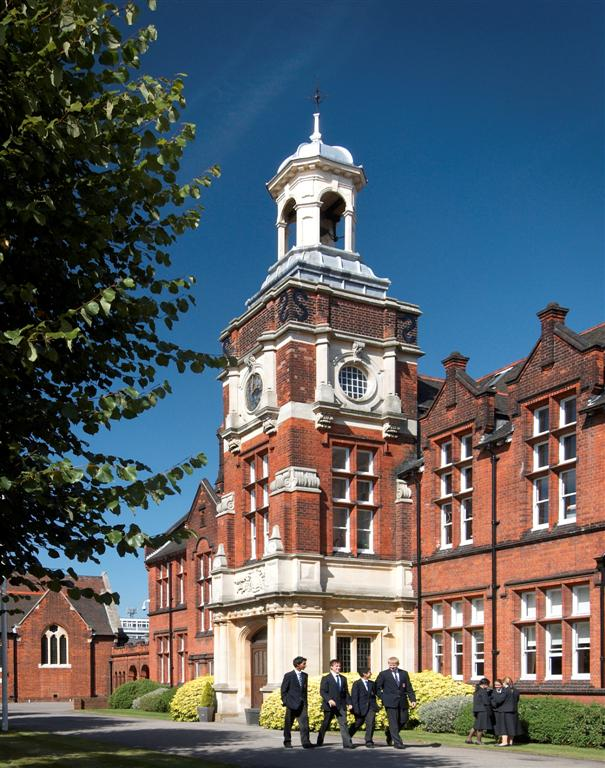

Location
- Middleton Hall Lane; Brentwood, Essex, CM15 8EE; England

Information
- Type: Public School; Independent day and boarding
- Mottoes: Virtue, learning and manners Incipe; Latin: Make a good start
- Religious affiliation: Church of England
- Established: 1557; 469 years ago
- Founder: Sir Antony Browne
- Department for Education URN: 115429 Tables
- Chairman of Governors: Lord Black of Brentwood
- Headmaster: Michael Bond
- Staff: 137
- Gender: Coeducational (Diamond Model)
- Age: 3 to 19
- Enrolment: 1,531
- Capacity: 1570
- Houses: North; South; East; West; Weald; Mill Hill (female boarders); Hough (male boarders)
- Colour: Blue
- Publication: The Brentwoodian (student produced); Brentwood School Times; The Chronicle of the Society of Old Brentwoods
- Alumni: Old Brentwoods
- Campus size: 72 acres (29 ha)
- School years: Preparatory–sixth form
- Website: Official website

Brentwood School is a selective, independent day and boarding school in Brentwood, Essex, England in the public school tradition. The school comprises a preparatory school, senior school and sixth form, as well as boarding provision for both boys and girls. The school is coeducational, and employs the "Diamond Model". The school is a member of the Headmasters' and Headmistresses' Conference, the IAPS, and the AGBIS.

Founded in 1557 and opened in 1558, the school has a Tudor schoolroom, a Victorian chapel and several Grade II listed buildings. Situated on Ingrave Road, astride Middleton Hall Lane and Shenfield Road, the school is set in over 72 acres (29 hectares) of land in the centre of Brentwood. The current headmaster is Michael Bond.

== History ==
=== 16th–18th century ===
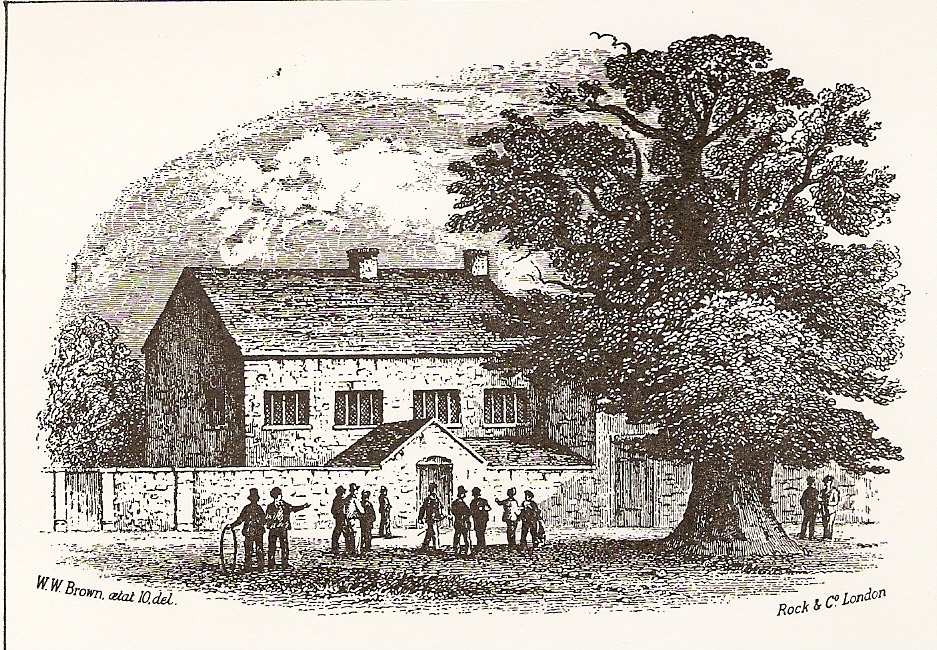
Brentwood School and the Martyr's Elm, 1847

The licence to found the school as The Grammar School of Antony Browne, Serjeant at the Law, in Brentwood was granted by Queen Mary I to Sir Antony (or Anthony) Browne on 5 July 1558. The first schoolmaster, George Otway, was appointed on 28 July 1558.

In 1568, a year after Browne's death, the school moved to a purpose-built schoolroom, which is extant. The commemoration stone was laid by Browne's stepdaughter, Dorothy Huddleston, and her husband Edward, Browne's marriage having been childless.

The school room is beside the site of the execution of nineteen-year-old William Hunter, who was burned at the stake for denying the doctrine of transubstantiation. The Martyr's Elm grew, allegedly, on the spot of his immolation. It was Browne who, as a Justice of the Peace under Queen Mary, had sentenced Hunter. Some believe the school was founded as Browne's penance for Hunter's martyrdom when Queen Elizabeth I came to the throne; however, the school was already in operation under Mary's licence when Elizabeth succeeded.

Although Browne had drawn up statutes for the school, they were never legally adopted and so were re-drawn in 1622 by his descendants and John Donne, Dean of St Paul's.

=== 19th century ===
Brentwood School Combined Cadet Force (CCF) was founded in 1861 and so is one of the earliest CCFs in the country.

=== 20th century ===
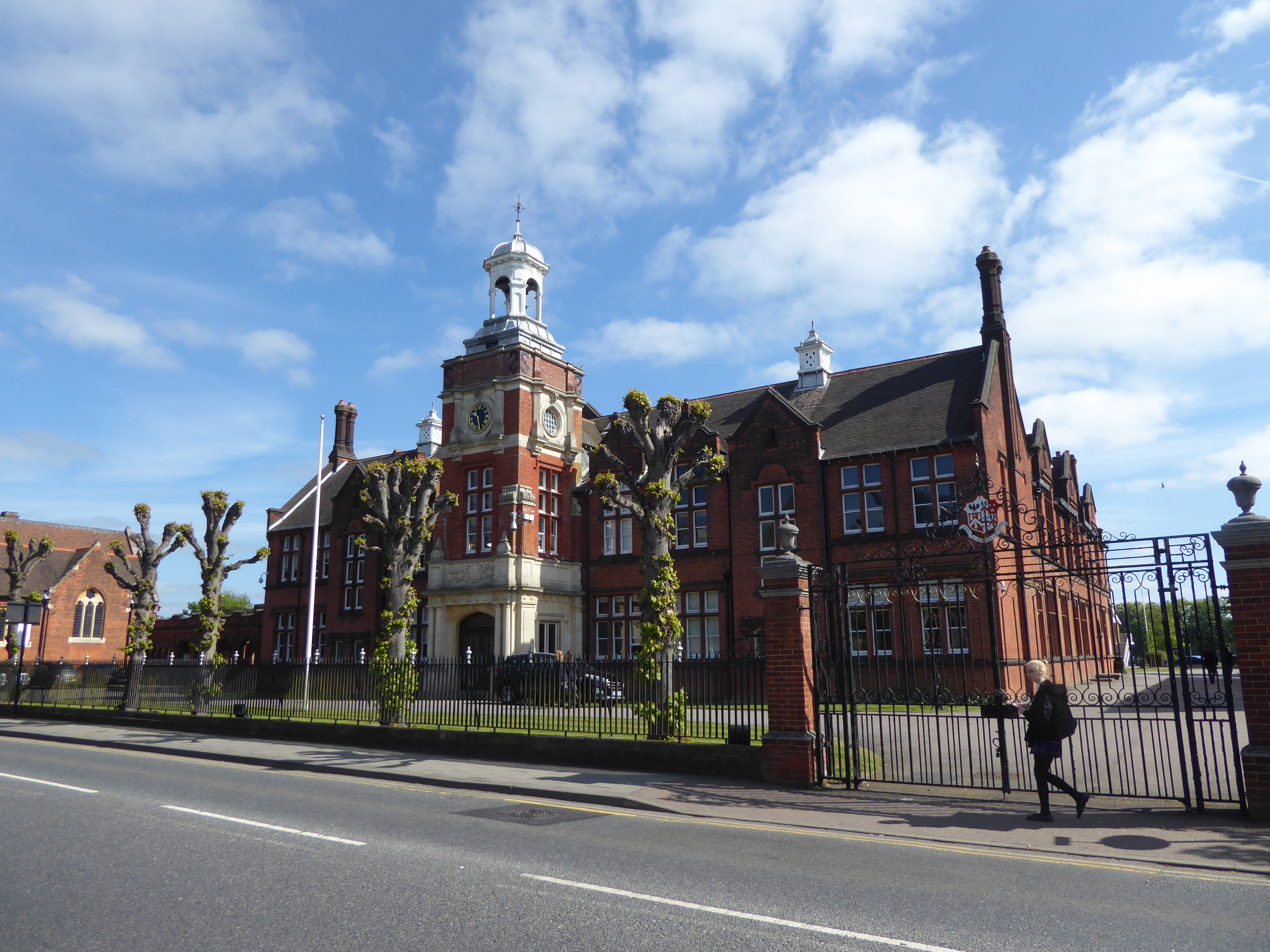

Sixty Old Brentwoods were killed on active service during the First World War and 173 during the Second World War. Their names are listed in the school chapel, and commemorated by the Memorial Hall for the first war and the pavilion for the second. The school was a direct grant grammar school from the 1960s until the abolition of the scheme in 1977.

Brentwood was originally a boys' school, but the Governors made the decision to allow a small number of girls to enter the sixth form in 1974. By the early 1980s there were 23 girls in the sixth form. Initially based in Newnum House, the girls' school opened in 1988, admitting girls from ages 11 to 18.

=== 21st century ===
In 2007, Brentwood School celebrated its 450th anniversary with a commemorative service in St Paul's Cathedral.

The school's Combined Cadet Force (CCF) celebrated its 150th anniversary on 8 October 2011 by holding a special afternoon of events featuring the inspection of a Guard of Honour by Lt General Brown CBE. The Royal British Legion Youth Band of Brentwood played at the start and end of the afternoon.

In 2012, the Earl of Wessex visited the school to open the new sixth form centre, featuring a 400-seat auditorium, named The Wessex Auditorium in his honour.

==== Sexual abuse ====
In 2024, former Director of Music at Brentwood School, David Pickthall (born 28 September 1958), was convicted of a variety of sexual offences against the pupils of Brentwood School, who were aged between 9 and 16 at the time of the abuse. The abuse was committed over a sustained period from 1979 to 2021. He was sentenced on 11 November 2024 at Chelmsford Crown Court to serve a jail sentence of 12 years.

== School arms ==
Coat of arms of Brentwood School, Essex
| Notes Granted 19 July 1957. Escutcheon Gules, a chevron between three lions' gambs erased and a bordure Argent, in the honour point a fleur-de-lys Or, on a chief also Argent an eagle displayed looking to the sinister Sable, beaked and legged and anciently crowned gold (Browne), impaling Quarterly, first and fourth Argent, a chevron Gules between three lions' faces Sable (Farington), second Gules three pierced cinquefoils Argent, (Farington), third Argent a cross engrailed Sable between four torteaux (Clayton); the whole within a bordure Gules. Motto 'Virtue, Learning, Manners' |

The arms of Brentwood School are derived from those of the founder, Sir Antony Browne, and his wife.

As part of the commemoration of the 400th anniversary of the school's founding, a special variant of Sir Antony Browne's Coat of Arms was granted by the Honourable Sir George Rothe Bellew, Garter Principal King of Arms and Sir John Dunamace Heaton-Armstrong, Clarenceux King of Arms on 19 July 1957. A red border was added to the arms to distinguish them as the school's, as opposed to those of Browne.

== The school today ==
=== Academic ===
The school is separated into three sections: the preparatory school (ages 3 to 11), the senior school (ages 11 to 16) and the sixth form (ages 16 to 18). Brentwood operates in a diamond school format, in which the preparatory school and sixth form are co-educational while the senior school teaches boys and girls separately.

Brentwood Preparatory School teaches children aged 3–11, from Nursery through to Year 6. Classes were usually small prior to 2014, with an average size of 20 per class.

The senior school teaches pupils from the age of 11 until the end of GCSE courses at 16+. Many pupils move into the senior school from the preparatory school, but others are drawn from other local primary and preparatory schools; around 1/3 of pupils join the school from the maintained sector. Admission to the senior school is by entrance examination.

The sixth form is for pupils aged 16‑18 who are studying for 'A' levels, the International Baccalaureate and BTec Extended Diploma in Sport or Business. There are currently c.300 pupils in the sixth form.

=== Sport ===
Sports offered include Association football, cricket, fencing, gymnastics, hockey, netball, rifle shooting, Rugby football, squash, swimming and tennis. School teams have met with some success over the years, for example winning the Essex Schools FA Cup three times in four seasons.

In 2008 the school U13 cricket team won the National Schools Cup (Bunbury Cup), to be crowned National Champions, having finished as runners up in 2007.

The school is set in 72 acres (29 ha) of grounds and has two playing-fields; one is situated directly on the school site and another, The Heseltines, adjacent to the school. These contain football, rugby, cricket and hockey pitches, an all-weather AstroTurf pitch, tennis and netball courts, an athletics track and field, and woods used for cross-country runs.

Ex-England test cricketer Geraint Jones is the school's cricket coach.

=== Sir Antony Browne Society (SABS) ===
SABS is a society that focuses on furthering the education of sixth formers through a series of guest speakers and debates. Junior SABS is available for the younger pupils. Regular meetings are held in Old Big School, at which students are able to experience lectures on societal issues or topics to concerning science, the arts and sport, or a members' debate. Old Brentwoods such as Jack Straw and Griff Rhys Jones are regular speakers. Other speakers have been political figures, such as George Galloway, Vicky Pryce, Lord Lilley and the philosopher A. C. Grayling.

=== Royal visits and connections ===
The licence to found the school was granted by Queen Mary to Sir Antony Browne on 5 July 1558. Queen Elizabeth II visited the school in 1957 to open the new science department, now named The Queens Building, the foundation stone of which had been laid by the Lord Lieutenant of Essex, Col. Sir Francis Whitmore. The Earl of Wessex visited the school in 2011 for the opening ceremony of the new sixth form centre and the naming of the Wessex Auditorium, and later to inspect a Combined Cadet Force Guard of Honour. Princess Anne visited the School in November 2012.

=== RIBA Award ===
In 2012, Brentwood School's sixth form centre was winner of the Royal Institute of British Architects (RIBA) East of England Award. The institute described the development as having drawn "inspiration from the existing Victorian vicarage" and that "the new design is expressed in a language that is both contextual and contemporary. The sculpting of the roofs creates non-standard, domestic-scaled classrooms filled with natural light, reminiscent of the gabled roofs of the Victorian vicarage, but with an added measure of playfulness."

== Notable alumni ==
The official alumni logo for the Old Brentwoods community

Old Brentwoods are those who have attended the school (preparatory, senior school or sixth form) for any length of time. The logo used to represent Old Brentwoods and the Society of Old Brentwoods is the wing and claw, derived from the arms of Sir Antony Browne. A crown was added to the logo in 1957 to celebrate The Queen's visit to the school.

The colours of Old Brentwoods are dark blue, light blue and gold. Light blue and dark blue were traditionally featured as stripes on the blazers of Old Brentwoods and are still used today to represent the alumni community. The colours were carried across to the alumni logo, with the addition of gold on the inclusion of the crown in 1957.

=== Old Brentwoods ===
Also see the school's own list of Old Brentwoods.

- David Acfield (born 1947), cricketer and Olympic fencer
- Douglas Adams (1952–2001), author of The Hitchhiker's Guide to the Galaxy
- Keith Allen (born 1953), comedian, actor, singer and writer (father of the singer Lily Allen)
- Peter Allen (born 1946), BBC broadcaster and journalist
- Sir Hardy Amies (1909–2003), Couturier and Dressmaker by Appointment to Her Majesty The Queen
- Peter Barker (born 1983), squash player and influential member of winning English team in European Team Championships 2006
- Charles Bean (1879–1963), historian of Australian Forces in World War I.
- Charlie Bean (born 1953), executive director and Chief Economist of the Bank of England
- Lilian Bennett (1922–2013) businesswoman, and the chairman and chief executive of Manpower UK - attended whilst it was only a boys' school
- Guy Black, Baron Black of Brentwood (born 1964), former Press Secretary to Michael Howard, and Director of PCC
- Norman Burrell (1900–1986), cricketer
- George Cansdale (1909–1993), zoologist and broadcaster
- Patrick Carter, Baron Carter of Coles (born 1946), politician and life peer
- Colonel Sir Neville Chamberlain (1856–1944), army officer, Inspector-General of the Royal Irish Constabulary and inventor of snooker
- Roger Cowley (born 1939), professor of experimental philosophy at the University of Oxford
- Frank Cowper (1849–1930), yachtsman, writer and illustrator
- Sir Robin Day (1923–2000), broadcaster (attended the school 1934–1938)
- George Dobson (born 1997), association footballer currently playing for Championship side Wrexham A.F.C
- Max Dowman (born 2009), association footballer currently playing for Premier League side Arsenal F.C.
- Sir David Eady (born 1943), High Court Judge
- Noel Edmonds (born 1948), disc jockey and broadcaster
- David Eldridge (born 1973), playwright
- Jonn Elledge (born 1980), journalist and author
- Stephen Fleet (1936–2006), Master of Downing College, Cambridge
- Howard Flight (born 1948), Conservative politician
- Sir Roderick Floud (born 1942), academic, vice-president of the European Universities Association
- Fabian Hamilton (born 1955), Labour politician
- Neil Harris (born 1977), association footballer
- Edward "Eddie" Hearn (born 1979), sports promoter
- Keith Hopkins (1934–2004), influential historian and sociologist, Professor of Ancient History at the University of Cambridge
- David Irving (born 1938), writer and Holocaust denier
- Chris Jarvis (born 1969), television presenter
- Paul Neil Milne Johnstone (1952–2004) poet and butt of Douglas Adams' jokes in The Hitchhiker's Guide to the Galaxy
- Nic Jones (born 1947), musician
- Frank Lampard (born 1978), association football player and manager
- Andrew Lansley (born 1956), Conservative politician, former Leader of the House of Commons 2012–2014 and former Secretary of State for Health, current member of the House of Lords
- Elliot Lee (born 1994), association footballer
- Olly Lee (born 1991), association footballer
- Frank Godbould Lee (1903–1971), civil servant and Master of Corpus Christi College, University of Cambridge
- Sir Ralph Murray (1908–1983), diplomat
- Jodie Marsh (born 1978), glamour model
- Ian Martin (born 1948), Special Representative of the Secretary General of the UN & Secretary-General of Amnesty International
- Derek Martinus, TV director
- Jake Maskall (born 1971), actor
- Robert Ogilvie (1853–1938), England international association footballer
- Hal Ozsan (born 1976), actor
- Nigel Paterson (born 1947), guitarist, educator, composer
- Michael Peppiatt (born 1941), writer and art historian
- Eric Peters (born 1969), rugby player
- Ian Pont (born 1961), professional cricketer, international coach and author
- Rishi Patel (born 1998), professional cricketer
- Penny Rimbaud (born Jeremy Ratter 1943), drummer, poet and founder of punk band Crass
- Griff Rhys Jones (born 1953), comedian and actor
- Stewart Robson (born 1964), association footballer
- Sir John Rogers (1928), Air Chief Marshal in the Royal Air Force and member of the FIA World Motor Sport Council
- Vivian Rosewarne (1917 – May 1940) Wellington bomber pilot memorialised in the 1941 film An Airman's Letter to His Mother
- Duncan Sanderson (born 1948), musician
- Sir Nick Scheele (born 1944), former President of the Ford Motor Company
- Daryl Selby (born 1982), professional squash player
- Asad Shan model and actor
- Bob Simpson (1944–2006), BBC journalist
- Sir Peter Stothard (born 1951), former editor of The Times
- Jack Straw (born 1946), Labour politician, Lord High Chancellor of Great Britain 2007–2010
- Charles Thomson (born 1953), founder of the Stuckists art movement
- Michael Francis Tompsett (born 1939), inventor of CCD imagers
- Paul Wickens (born 1956) musician, usually known as "Wix", for many years, Paul McCartney's musical director on tour.
- Teerathep Winothai (born 1985), Thai footballer
- Sir Denis Wright (1911–2005) ambassador and author
- Stephen Yardley (born 1942), actor
