= Shani (1989 film) =

Shaani
- Film poster
- Directed by: Saeed Rizvi
- Produced by: Rafiq Rizvi
- Starring: Babra Sharif; Sherry Malik; Asif Khan; Mohammad Ali
- Music by: Azhar Hussain
- Production company: Novitas
- Distributed by: Evernew Pictures (Pvt) Ltd.
- Release date: 10 March 1989
- Running time: 180 minutes
- Country: Pakistan
- Language: Urdu

Shaani or Shanee is a 1989 Pakistani science fiction film directed by Saeed Rizvi and starring Babra Sharif, Sherry Malik, Asif Khan, and Mohammad Ali. The film is famous for its special effects which were first used in Pakistan.

== Plot ==
Shanee begins with a glowing space ship that arrives in the middle of the forest near a village. A glowing figure appears and follows a terrified Heena (Babra Sharif) to her house where he decides to assume the appearance of a young man (Sherry Malik) he happens to view in a lovingly framed photograph. He is greeted with open arms by the villagers, especially by a blushing Heena and her family. Unknown to the spaceman, he has assumed the appearance of Shanee, the man who Heena was due to marry and who was supposedly brutally murdered by a villainous goon by the name of Shamsher Khan (Asif Khan).

The fake Shanee lands in the thick of it upon his arrival because when he refuses to marry her as everyone expected, she blackmails him and forces him to change his mind. Anyway, all appears hunky dory and Shanee even turns his nose up at going home defying orders from his planet claiming that he has fallen for the ways of the humans! Then one fine day things turn nasty when evil goon Shamsher Khan, king of flesh trade discovers that the thorn he thought he had extracted once and for all has resurfaced to threaten him once again.

While trying to fight for the man whose identity he took on, due to the feeling of obligation he falls in love with Heena. The alien who landed on Earth came in search of a planet where his people are able to survive but after falling in love, will he be able to return to his people and his land after the hate against humanity that they have seen?

== Cast ==
- Babra Sharif as Heena
- Sherry Malik as Shaani
- Mohammad Ali
- Asif Khan
- Saeed Rizvi
- Sabiha Khanum
- Nayyar Sultana
- Agha Talish
- Tamanna
- Rizwan Wasti
- Munaza Sheikh
- Baby Tina

== Awards ==
The film won four Nigar Awards in 1989. The film also does not have any songs which according to director Saeed Rizvi, increased his belief in special effects.
