= Munaza Sheikh =

Pakistani film actress

- منزہ شیخ
- Occupation: Film actress
- Years active: 1986 - 1993
- Awards: Nigar Award (1990)

Munaza Sheikh is a Pakistani former film actress. She is known for her supporting roles in the movies Deewani Disco Di (1989), Shani (1989), Sher Dil (1990), and Zid (1991). In 1990, she won the best supporting actress Nigar Award.

== Career ==
Sheikh started her film career in 1986 in the Urdu film Miss Bangkok, directed by Iqbal Akhtar. In 1989, she was paired with Ismael Shah in a lead role in Ejaz Hussain's Punjabi movie Dewani Disco Di. Her last film Ruqqa was released in 1993.

== Filmography ==
- Miss Bangkok (1986)
- Dewani Disco Di (1989)
- Shani (1989)
- Jangloos (1990)
- Sher Dil (1990)
- Sholay ee Sholay (1990)
- Aalmi Jasoos (1991)
- Zid (1991)
- Billu Badshah (1991)
- Shera Pandi (1992)
- Koday Shah (1992)
- Ruqqa (1993)

== Awards ==
| Year | Award | Category | Result | Film | Ref. |
|---|---|---|---|---|---|
| 1990 | Nigar Award | Best Supporting Actress | Won | Sher Dil | |
