= Dushman (TV series) =

Pakistani television series, 2022–2023

- Original title: دشمن
- Written by: Ali Moeen
- Directed by: Abdullah Badini
- Starring: Nadia Afgan; Saman Ansari; Feroza Muhammad; Naila Jaffri; Sabeeka Imam; Hassan Niazi; Hadi bin Arshad
- Country of origin: Pakistan
- Original language: Urdu
- No. of episodes: 32

Production
- Producer: Zeeshan Ahmed
- Cinematography: Sarfaraz Ahmed
- Production company: Mont Blanc Entertainment

Original release
- Network: PTV Home
- Release: 26 May 2022 – 23 January 2023

Dushman (transl. Enemy) is a 2022 Pakistani drama television series first broadcast on PTV Home as a part of night primetime programming. It is written by Ali Moeen, directed by Abdullah Badini, and produced by Zeeshan Ahmed under the Mont Blanc Entertainment banner. The series has an ensemble cast of Nadia Afgan, Saman Ansari, Feroza Muhammad, Nayyar Ejaz, Hassan Niazi, Sabeeka Imam, Ayub Khoso and Naila Jaffri in her last on-screen appearance.

== Plot ==
There is a generation of adversity between the states of Rajkot and Malikgar. In this bloodshed game, all the male heirs have been murdered and then the feuding matriarchs fight for revenge. Waris and Sassi, the children of these matriarchs fall for each other and marry secretly. However, when Mai Lali of Rajkot learns of this, she murders Waris. Waris's pregnant wife and Mai's daughter, Sassi seeks shelter with the Maliks as she wants to hand over her unborn child to the family of her late spouse. Enraged by her brother's murder, Sohni returns from abroad and sets a trap for the last heir of the enemies, Mai Laali's son Zain.

== Cast ==
- Nadia Afgan as Malkani Bibi
- Saman Ansari as Mai Laali
- Naila Jaffri as Durri
- Sabeeka Imam as Sassi
- Hassan Niazi as Waris
- Nayyar Ejaz as Ranjha
- Ayub Khoso as Billa "Munshi"
- Mohsin Gillani as Malhar
- Hadi Bin Arshad as Zain
- Feroza Mohammad as Sohni

== Production ==
The project was first announced by Afgan in an interview where she revealed that one of her upcoming series is titled Dushman which is directed by Abdullah Badini and written by Ali Moeen, and she will play the role of Malkani Bibi, a powerful Saraiki head of the clan. The role was earlier offered to Shagufta Ijaz and Sania Saeed, who both rejected it. The principal photography started in Bahawalpur in 2020. In a conservation with DAWN Images, Afgan told that the series is developed by Fawad Chaudhry, who worked hard for the PTV's revival. An accident on the set led to the death of the series' cinematographer Sarfaraz Ahmed. It marked actress Naila Jaffri's last on-screen appearance before her death due to Ovarian cancer in July 2021. According to Mohammad, the series took 3 years to complete.

== Reception ==
The acting performances of the actors was especially praised by the critics. Youlin Magazine praised the Moeen's writing and performances of the actors, except of Ansari. The reviewer criticised her nasal voice and her badly delivered dialogues.
