= Sabeeka Imam =

British-Pakistani actress and model

Sabeeka
- Born: 20/08/1986; London, United Kingdom
- Occupations: Model, actress
- Years active: 2014 – present

Sabeeka Imam is a British-Pakistani actress and model. She has established a career in modeling and walked the ramp for several designers. Imam appeared in Vikas Bahl's comedy-drama film Queen in 2013. She went on to play the romantic interest of the lead male character in the commercially successful Urdu action films Jalaibee (2016) and Sherdil (2019).

== Personal life ==
Imam was born to Pakistani parents in London. In 2018, she started dating Hasnain Lehri. They ended their relationship in 2020 to which Imam said, "It has been a long time since we both realized that our paths are destined to be separate".

== Filmography ==
Year	Title	Role	Language	Ref(s)
Film
2014	Queen	Roxette / Rukhsar	Hindi	
2015	Welcome to London	Simran	Urdu/ English	
2015	Jalaibee	Eman	Urdu	
2019	Sherdil	Sarah Francis	Urdu	
Television
2016	Laaj	Alisha	Urdu	
2016	Muntazir	Kiran	Urdu	
2022	Dushman	Sassi	Urdu	
Music video
2014	"Roiyaan"	Farhan Saeed	Punjabi	
2018	"Hum Donu"	Strings	Urdu	
2020	"Nai Jeena"	Sibtain Khalid	Urdu	
2020	"Bhanwaray"	Goher Mumtaz	Urdu	

== Awards and nominations ==
Year	Awards	Category	Result
2015	Hum Award	Best Model Female	Won
