= Lilian Bennett =

Lilian Margery Bennett OBE (née Barnett, 1922–2013), was a British businesswoman, and the chairman and chief executive of Manpower UK from 1990 to 1998. According to The Times, she had an important role in the growth of the use of temporary staff in business.

== Early life ==
She was born Lilian Margery Barnett on 22 August 1922 at 8 Dunsmure Road, Stamford Hill, London, the eldest of four daughters of Maurice Sidney Barnett, a schoolmaster, and his wife, Sophia Barnett, née Levy. Her mother's father was the Rev Jacob Baer Levy, a United Synagogue minister.

She was educated at West Ham secondary school, Brentwood School (although it was a boys' school), and in 1941, won a scholarship to study medicine at London's Royal Free Hospital, but did not take her place, as she started a business career instead.

== Career ==
In 1942, she started work in Dunstable, Bedfordshire, for a plastic aircraft component manufacturer, Thermo-Plastics Ltd, as an office junior, rising to sales and marketing manager in 1945, and sales director in 1957.

In 1968, she joined Manpower, as the marketing director of its UK operations. She became general manager of operations, and then a main board director in the early 1970s, with "responsibility for strategic planning and business development". In 1990, she became chairman and chief executive of Manpower UK in 1990, and retired in 1998.

== Honours ==
She was appointed OBE in 1993 for "services to employment".

== Personal life ==
On 2 November 1952, she married Ronald Bennett (1925–1974), a businessman and photographer, and they had one son.

== Later life ==
Bennett died on 12 August 2013 at her home in Wimbledon, London, and was survived by her son.
