= Saeed Rizvi =

Pakistani film director (born 1954)

- Born: 8 March 1954 (age 72); Bombay, British India
- Occupations: Cinematographer, film director and film producer
- Relatives: Rafique Rizvi (father) (also a film director)
- Awards: Nigar Award in 1989

Saeed Rizvi (Urdu: سعید رضوی) is a Pakistani film director.

== Early life and education ==
Saeed Rizvi was born on 27 October 1954 in Bombay, British India into the family of another Indian and Pakistani film director Rafique Rizvi. His family migrated to Lahore, Pakistan a couple years after the independence of Pakistan in 1947. His family later moved to Karachi and Saeed Rizvi graduated from the University of Karachi.

== Career ==
He started his professional career as a cameraman in 1973. He learned visual effects, animation and graphics.

== The movie industry and the government ==
Rizvi would like the government to play a more optimistic role in the movie industry. He exclusively blames General Zia ul Haq for the destruction of the movie industry in Pakistan because of his outlook towards it. Rizvi attempted to open the lines of communication between himself and the General to try and discuss the movie industry as well as art. However, the General refused to meet with him and his workforce to discuss the matter. The bitter reality of the banks in Pakistan is that they are not lenient towards approving loans for the producers and directors of the industry; this fact is rather disappointing for him.

== Interview ==
Pakistan Film Producers Association said President General Pervez Musharraf approved a request to delete the words `Indian artiste' and `Indian director' from censorship guidelines that had prevented the release of films featuring Indian actors and directors.

"An appeal was made to President Musharraf and the president has omitted this clause," Rizvi told the Associated Press of Pakistan by telephone from the Pakistani city of Karachi.

The distributor of the 1984 romance Sohni Mahiwal an Indo-Russian joint production, approached Musharraf for the waiver. On Friday, the censor board took out the reference to Indians in its rules, Rizvi said.

Authorities in Pakistan could not immediately be reached to confirm the statement.

Top Indian filmmaker Mahesh Bhatt, who has in recent years led the way in hiring Pakistani actors, singers and composers in his films, welcomed the move. Bhatt has, for years, planned to shoot a film in Pakistan, but has not received permission.

"It is a major shift. This will see an upsurge in co-productions. We could now see Pakistani films with Indian actors," Bhatt told AP from Bombay, where India's film industry is based. "Pakistan's film industry is on its last legs and they are looking for a life support system. It is quite courageous of them to come to terms with the reality."

Even during the ban, and despite a half-century of bitter rivalry between the two countries, Indian films are hugely popular in Pakistan. Illicit copies are easy to find.

"Pakistanis are crazy about Indian films," said Rizvi. "This will give a new life to the Pakistani film industry. If we are allowed to make joint ventures, we will get a new market."

Pakistani producers have worked secretly in India for years, getting around a government ban by purportedly going to visit family and friends but getting films edited and music composed in Bombay.

"We have all been doing work in India. But … I don't want this to be a secret," Rizvi said. "I want the governments to allow this so that we can do it openly."

Pakistani cultural products are legal in India, and Pakistan's poetry, songs and television dramas are widely popular there. Several Pakistani poets and singers are superstars in India.

Bhatt said lifting the ban will help further ease tensions between India and Pakistan.

"These small baby steps are an indication that the process is heading slowly and certainly in the right direction," he said. "But we are far, far away from home. All concerned people who want the South Asian region to be safe and prosperous need to keep pushing."

== Controversies ==
Pakistan Film Producers Association Chairman Saeed Rizvi has accused Luqman, the producer and director of ‘Pehla Pehla Pyaar,’ of failing to pay Technicolor.

Luqman has denied the charges and, in turn, pointed the finger at the Thai lab for failing to meet a previous commitment.

A letter from Technicolor stated that Mubashir Luqman Films owed them $80,000 and threatened legal action if the amount remained unpaid. The lab also mentioned that they still have the film's negatives in storage and they will start charging storage fees.

Luqman responded by saying he was willing to clear up any misunderstandings, if the lab contacted him.

== Filmography ==
- Shaani (1989) (a science fiction movie)
- Sarkata Insaan (1994)
- Tilismi Jazeera (1996)
- Dil Bhi Tera Hum Bhi Teray (1999)

== Awards and recognition ==
- Nigar Award for Best Director for film Shaani (1989).
