= Welcome to London =

7 Welcome to London
- Theatrical Poster
- Directed by: Asad Shan
- Written by: Manju Iyer; Asad Shan
- Produced by: Iconic Productions Uk Ltd
- Starring: Sabeeka Imam; Asad Shan; Aliakbar Campwala
- Edited by: Leo Ferreira, Israr Azam
- Music by: Blair Mowat
- Distributed by: GEO Films
- Release date: 30 January 2015
- Running time: 109 minutes
- Countries: United Kingdom; Pakistan
- Languages: Urdu; English

7 Welcome to London is a British romantic thriller produced, written, directed and starring Asad Shan. Set and filmed in the United Kingdom, the film tells the story of Jai, a young Punjabi man from Delhi who leaves his debt-ridden family in India to fulfill his dream of a brighter future. With luck on his side and a budding romance on the undergrounds of London city, Jai is on his way up until things start to take an unfortunate turn. The film combines elements of crime, drama and romance.

Welcome to London had its official trailer viewing at the Cannes Film Festival. The London-based film had a successful UK wide release . It has received critical acclaim after its UK release and has gone on to become the most successful British Hindi language film in the UK. The film is slated for release in the Pakistan on 30 January 2015.

The film has received widespread support from the Bollywood fraternity with actors such as Shahrukh Khan lending advice to the actor, director and filmmaker Asad Shan's debut venture. Bafta and Oscar-winning editor Chris Dickens served as the creative consultant for the film and has seamlessly blended Bollywood with international film stylistics and techniques. It has been described "Karan Johar meets Guy Ritchie" by director Asad Shan.

== Plot ==
Twenty-five-year-old Jai, portrayed by Asad Shan, an impoverished life in Delhi with his humble Punjabi family who he constantly struggles to support. He migrates to London on a three-month tourist visa to fulfill his dream and earn a decent living as an illegal immigrant, leaving his family burdened with a loan. London is his most beautiful dream. Soon he finds a best friend Goldie (Aliakbar Campwala) on a council estate and find love on the London underground in the form of Simran (Sabeeka Imam) who is Shahrukh Khan's biggest fan. One phone call changes his life and he becomes trapped in a dark and dangerous situation leading to an edgy, exciting, fast-paced thriller where each man is on his own and its a jungle law.

== Cast ==
- Asad Shan as Jai
- Sabeeka Imam as Simran
- Aseem Tiwari as Jason
- Aliakbar Campwala as Goldie
- Javed Khan as Mani
- Sandeep Garcha as Geet
- Patrick Moorhouse as Rich Old Man
- Timur Ahmet as Twins Gangster
- Tim Hibberd as Tony
- Tom Bonington as Shaky Eight
- Dave Reeve as Ringmaster
- Rob Thorne as Big Man 1
- Daniel Jordan as Erratic Jew

== Soundtrack ==
The soundtrack of the film was released in various formats. The music is conducted by Blair Mowat with contributions from various artists including Pakistani sensations - Access Band, Falak Shabir and Zuj Jibran to name a few.

Track #	Song	Singer(s)
1	Tera Saath Ho	Falak Shabir
2	Paas Akay	Sohail Haider
3	Yaadan	Access Band
4	Mera Mann	Falak Shabir
5	Bayrukhi	Zuj Jibran
6	Rog	Falak Shabir
7	Hum Adhoray	Zuj Jibran
8	Rog Remix	Falak Shabir
9	Yaadan Remix	Access Band feat. DJ Kumash, DJ Jay & DJ Jez Pereira
10	Paas Akay Remix	Sohail Haider
