= Air operations during the Greek Civil War =

Air operations during the Greek Civil War involved primarily the air forces of the United Kingdom, South Africa, and the government of Greece against ground elements of the ELAS and other anti-government forces.

== Arrival of the Royal Air Force ==
The arrival of British forces to Greece in September 1944 brought with it the Royal Air Force. The airfield at Araxos became the first foothold, being captured on 23 September 1944 and many airfields around it were secured within a month, including Megara taken by parachute landings of 4 Para. Near Athens, Kalamaki ultimately became the center of RAF activity, renamed Hassani on 1 December 1944, as home for No. 337 Wing RAF, under which operated a number of squadrons:

- No. 32 Squadron RAF with the Supermarine Spitfire V
- No. 94 Squadron RAF with the Supermarine Spitfire V
- No. 108 Squadron RAF with the Bristol Beaufighter VI
- No. 216 Squadron RAF with the Douglas Dakota IV
- No. 221 Squadron RAF with the Vickers Wellington XIII

These were bolstered by the arrival in November 1944 of No. 335 Squadron RHAF and No. 336 Squadron RHAF. Both of these were Greek manned units within the RAF and would become the first operational units of the Royal Hellenic Air Force. Both flew the Spitfire Vb fighter.

Sedes was opened with the liberation of northern Greece and became the new home for No. 32 Sqn.

On 2 December 1944, tensions over the role of the EAM and ELAS parties in post-war government resulted in demonstration during which British forces opened fire, killing ten civilians. The response was attacks on police stations and thus RAF units began operations against ELAS and EAM targets, mostly around Athens. No. 73 Sqn, along with the newly arrived No. 94 Squadron RAF, used their Spitfires on strafing runs and light bombing was undertaken by No. 108 Sqn. Additional options were gained when a flight of Beaufighters of No. 39 Squadron RAF were attached to No. 108 Sqn., armed with RP-3 rockets. These were considered very effective and over the span of two weeks 105 targets (55 buildings, 19 command posts, 10 supply dumps, 2 radio stations, 12 transportation, and 7 artillery) were struck by these aircraft. The regular aircraft of No. 108 flew 265 sorties during December. The heavy bombers of No. 221 Sqn were primarily used in supply flights to the Sedes facility as well as various leaflet and illumination missions. Two actual bombing raids were carried out (both at night). The Greek Spitfire squadrons did not participate in the attacks, although the newly formed No. 13 Squadron RHAF did assist in leaflet operations.

The RAF suffered a major blow with the attack by ELAS troops on their facility at Kifisia, which was home to Allied Headquarters Greece, on 19 December 1944. The No. 2933 Squadron RAF Regiment defended strongly but was ultimately overrun with the capture of many British prisoners. No. 221 Sqn. conducted supply drops to these personnel during their march north. By 7 January 1945, Athens was secured, and a ceasefire negotiated on 11 January. While some fighting continued, British fighter squadrons were withdrawn by summer 1945. Hassani continued to be a hub of RAF operations however the arrival of No. 252 Wing RAF with three Douglas Boston V equipped units, No. 13 Squadron RAF, No. 18 Squadron RAF, and No. 55 Squadron RAF.

== Formation of the Royal Hellenic Air Force ==
1946 saw the official transfer of Greek manned RAF squadrons into the Royal Hellenic Air Force. In addition to the aforementioned Nos. 13, 335, and 336 Sqns., these also included the No. 355 Squadron RHAF with a variety of transport types, including the C-47, Avro Anson, and Wellington and the 345, 346, and 347 Flights using the Auster AOP and other utility aircraft for liaison.

Meanwhile, government opposition was on the rise and the formation of the Democratic Army of Greece led to the loss of control of much of rural Greece. The Greek National Army responded with Operation Terminus, but this was a failure. March 1948 saw the RHAF enter the action with attacks on landing strips set up by Communist forces to receive aid from Albania and Yugoslavia. Involvement by the United States led to the launch of Operation Dawn in April 1948, and this was supported by RHAF units with a total of 641 sorties with the loss of one Spitfire plus damage to ten more. Dakotas were utilized for leaflet and supply operations. The operation was successful but the withdrawal to northern border regions limited RHAF effectiveness due to a five-mile stop line to avoid an international incident.

== Offensive support by the RHAF ==
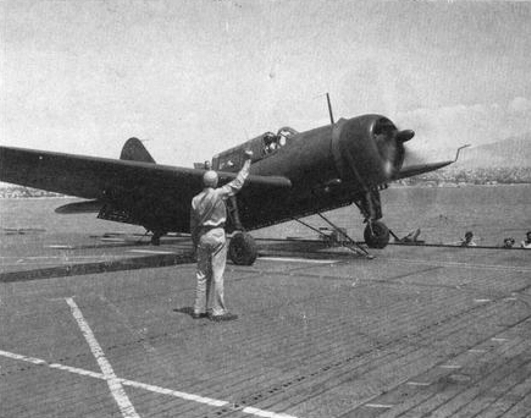
A Curtiss SB2C is launched from USS Sicily off Piraeus, in August 1949.

Operation Coronis was launched in July 1948 against enemy forces in the Grammos Mountains with the support of Nos. 335 and 336 Sqns. operating from Yannina and Kozani. Additional aircraft included AT-6 Texan and Auster aircraft. Ultimate results were a draw as anti-government forces withdrew across the border to Albania. No. 337 Squadron RHAF had been formed with Spitfire IX aircraft, giving the RHAF three Spitfire units. For heavier bombing, Dakotas were jury-rigged with racks for bombs up to 500 lb each. RAF deHavilland Mosquito photo reconnaissance aircraft were reportedly used in the affair. RHAF flew 3,474 sorties during the operation, suffering one lost Spitfire plus a further 22 damaged.

Operations in September 1948 centered on the Vitsi Mountains area, and were supported again by the RHAF. They were marked by better cooperation with GNA units and the first use of napalm, although this was not used heavily. These operations lasted through the end of the year, bringing the grand total of sorties for 1948 to 8,907 combat and 9,891 transport, with the loss of twelve airmen. A major attack at Florina by guerrilla forces was defeated with significant air support by the RHAF.

August 1949 marked the final series of operations against the guerrilla forces, and again the RHAF played a large role in supporting government forces. In particular, during the final portion of the month, No. 336 Sqn. began employing its newly acquired Curtiss SB2C Helldiver aircraft, of which 40 had been acquired from the United States Navy. This operation resulted in the final destruction of opposition military resistance and resulted in a final ceasefire being signed. During August 826 sorties had been flown dropping 288 tons of bombs and firing 1935 rockets. Napalm was used again, with 114 such strikes being made.

== Aircraft of the Greek Civil War ==
- Airspeed Oxford: A small number of these utility aircraft were used by the RHAF for liaison and transport.
- Auster: A ubiquitous light plane of the period, the RHAF used the Auster as an observation and liaison aircraft and for numerous light duties. Most were A.O.P. 6 models.
- Avro Anson: Some of these utility aircraft were employed by the RHAF from the force's formation through the end of the civil war.
- Bristol Beaufighter: A heavier ground-attack aircraft, the Beaufighter Mark VIF (and some Mark VIII) was used by No. 108 Sqn. during the early RAF involvement in Greece. These were replaced by later model Mark X Beaufighters of No. 252 Sqn. later, although they were not heavily used by that point. The Beaufighters armed with rockets were particularly effective as an early support aircraft in operations during 1945. The Beaufighter ended its role with the withdrawal of No. 252 Sqn. in 1946.
- Curtiss SB2C Helldiver: Forty eight planes were acquired by the RHAF in spring 1949 from the United States Navy. Forty two dive bombers were used in operations and they proved to be the best strike aircraft of the RHAF and played an important role in the final stages of the civil war.
- de Havilland Mosquito: Only a few of these aircraft were utilized by RAF units in Greece, with a small number of Mark XXVI aircraft employed by No. 55 Sqn. After the withdrawal of RAF units, however, it was reported that Mosquitoes of No. 13 Sqn. conducted reconnaissance during 1948 on behalf of the Greek government.
- Douglas Boston: This light bomber was the backbone of the RAF units which maintained a presence in Greece from the end of active operations in 1945 to the withdrawal of the RAF in 1946.
- Douglas C-47 Skytrain and Dakota: Primary transport of the Allies in the later half of World War II, the Dakota accompanied the RAF to Greece and was heavily used to supply British forces there. Dakotas comprised the only South African Air Force aircraft to be operated there. Many were transferred to the RHAF, as were a number of C-47s from US stocks. Some were outfitted with crude bomb racks for use on heavier raids.
- Hawker Hurricane: A single unit of Hurricane Mark IV aircraft, No. 6 Sqn., deployed with the first RAF units, but was withdrawn before taking a role in the conflict.
- Martin Baltimore: A small number of these light bombers were acquired by the RHAF from the RAF and employed by No. 13 Sqn. in general support duties.
- Messerschmitt Bf 109: A small number of these German fighters were captured during the German withdrawal and operated with some success in a support role with No. 335 Sqn.
- North American T-6 Texan and Harvard: Large numbers of these useful aircraft were operated by the RHAF during the civil war. Most were AT-6 versions from the United States, although a number of the Harvard model from the RAF were acquired as well. They were useful as liaison, observation, and light strike aircraft and were a critical part of the effectiveness of other Greek strike aircraft during the operations in 1948.
- Supermarine Spitfire: Backbone of both the RAF and RHAF during their operations in the war, the Spitfire was operated in both Mark V and Mark IX versions for most of the conflict. The RHAF did begin receiving some Mark XVI models later in the conflict, while the RAF had operated a number of the Mark XI for photo-reconnaissance. Heavily used for strafing and later for napalm strikes, the Spitfire lacked range and ammunition in the strike role. Additionally, it proved more vulnerable to ground fire than the other types operated by the RHAF.
- Supermarine Walrus: A single unit of these amphibian aircraft was deployed for mine-spotting duties in the Adriatic.
- Vickers Wellington: Past its primary life as a bomber, Wellingtons of the RAF Coastal Command were deployed to Greece to assist RAF forces there. They carried out a number of support tasks, including leaflet and bombing missions. Originally the Mark XIII was used, although some Mark XIV also arrived. A small number found their way into the Greek inventory.

== Air units of the Greek Civil War ==
=== Royal Air Force ===
The Royal Air Force maintained a sizable presence in Greece from the liberation of Greece in September 1944 through the creation of the RHAF in 1946.

- No. 6 Squadron RAF: Arriving with the first RAF units in October 1944, No. 6 was the only Hurricane squadron in Greece, but was withdrawn during November 1944.
- No. 13 Squadron RAF: Along with No. 18 Sqn., operated Boston V light bombers from Hassani from September 1945 to April 1946.
- No. 18 Squadron RAF: Part of the relief forces to replace withdrawn RAF units, No. 18 was in Greece from September 1945 to March 1946 with Boston V light bombers.
- No. 32 Squadron RAF: Originally at Araxos and Hassani, and later based from Sedes, No. 32 was a primary RAF fighter squadron from its arrival in September 1944 to its departure in February 1945, during which it used the Spitfire VC.
- No. 38 Squadron RAF: Only deployed for a short period between October and November 1944, No. 38 operated Wellingtons for support duties.
- No. 39 Squadron RAF: Not deploying in full, No. 39 dispatched a flight of six Beaufighter VIF to assist No. 108 Sqn during December 1944. They were particularly effective due to their rocket armament.
- No. 55 Squadron RAF: A third Boston V light bomber squadron deployed to Greece in September 1945, No. 55 remained until November 1946, and also used the Mosquito XXVI.
- No. 73 Squadron RAF: Deployed in December 1944 and taking a sizeable role in the fighting around Athens, No. 73 used the Spitfire LF.IX and was withdrawn in January 1945.
- No. 94 Squadron RAF: Arriving in October 1944 and flying mainly from Hassani, No. 94 operated heavily in support of British operations around Athens in 1944, being withdrawn in April 1945. The unit used the Spitfire VB and VC.
- No. 108 Squadron RAF: Equipped with the Beaufighter VIF, No. 108 provided the backbone for RAF strike forces during its tenure, lasting from October 1944 through January 1945.
- No. 216 Squadron RAF: One of the busier units in Greece, the only Dakota equipped RAF unit operated in Greece from October 1944 through March 1946 performing primarily transport duties.
- No. 221 Squadron RAF: A Coastal Command unit equipped with Wellington XIII aircraft, No. 221 was part of the early RAF contingent in Greece and operated in a variety of support roles through its departure in April 1945.
- No. 252 Squadron RAF: No. 252 was equipped with more modern Beaufighter X aircraft, It arrived in October 1944and was among the last RAF forces withdrawn in December 1946.
- No. 624 Squadron RAF: An amphibian patrol and transport unit deployed for mine spotting in the Aegean from February to April 1945.
- No. 680 Squadron RAF: Deployed during January and February 1945, No. 680 employed Spitfire XI aircraft for photographic reconnaissance.

=== South African Air Force ===
The South African Air Force had a limited deployment to Greece which was withdrawn shortly before the end of World War II.

- No. 40 Squadron SAAF: This fighter reconnaissance unit detached four pilots (Lieut. H.H. Davison, Lieut. R.T. Joyner, Lieut. N.K. McCallum, and Lieut. A.C. Villiers) to Balkan Air Force on 9 December 1944, flying Spitfire V's on loan from No. 318 (Polish) Squadron. All four machines were lost making wheels-up landings on Zakynthos whilst crossing to Greece in stormy weather, but the pilots survived. Flying Spitfire V's assigned to a grounded Greek-manned squadron, the detachment operated out of Hassani from 13 December 1945 to 5 February 1945 under the direct control of Balkan Air Force.
- No. 44 Squadron SAAF: The only full squadron of the SAAF to deploy to Greece, No. 44 was a transport unit with Dakota IV aircraft operating out of Hassani from December 1944 to March 1945.

=== Royal Hellenic Air Force ===
The Royal Hellenic Air Force was formed from Greek units of the RAF in 1946 and by the end of that year had assumed sole duties from the RAF for the country.

- No. 13 Squadron RHAF: Based in Hassani from November 1944 through October 1946, it operated the Baltimore and Wellington on general support and reconnaissance duties.
- No. 335 Squadron RHAF: Originally an RAF unit with Spitfire VB fighters, it operated from Hassani from November 1944, although it was excluded from combat operations during through 1945. In May 1945 it replaced the role of the withdrawn No. 94 Sqn. as an operational fighter squadron. The squadron later acquired redeployed Bf 109 G-6s, Mark IX and XVI aircraft.
- No. 336 Squadron RHAF: Originally an RAF unit with Spitfire VB fighters and sister unit to No. 335, it served a training role as well until the withdrawal of No. 94 Sqn., which it replaced alongside No. 335. The squadron became the sole RHAF operator of the Curtiss SB2C-5 Helldiver when acquired in 1948.
- No. 337 Squadron RHAF: Formed as the third fighter squadron of the RHAF in July 1947, No. 337 was equipped with Spitfire IX (and later XVI) fighters and operated them through the end of the war.
- No. 355 Squadron RHAF: Originally an RAF unit with Anson and Wellington aircraft, No. 355 was the primary logistical squadron of the RHAF, adding C-47 aircraft as well. While most missions were support, some bombing missions were undertaken with modified aircraft.

== See also ==
- Greek Civil War
