= Hassan Niazi (actor) =

Pakistani film and television actor (born 1980)

- Born: Hassan Niazi; 3 February 1980 (age 46); Lahore, Punjab, Pakistan
- Occupation: Actor
- Years active: 2007–present

Hassan Niazi (Urdu: حسن نیازی; born 3 February 1980) is a Pakistani film and television actor.

== Early life ==
Niazi was born on 3 February 1980 in Lahore, Pakistan. He belongs to a Pashtun (Niazi) family of doctors and army officers.

== Career ==
Niazi's debut was a short role as Irfan in Fever in 2007, and subsequently acted in Ramchand Pakistani and Maalik.

In 2019, he played Arun Verani in the 2019 action film Sherdil.

== Filmography ==
=== Films ===
Year	Film	Role	Note
2008	Ramchand Pakistani	Deepak	Film debut
2016	Maalik	Chief minister	Negative role; main antagonist
2019	Sherdil	Arun Verani	Negative role; main antagonist

=== Television serials ===
Year	Drama	Role	Network	Note
2008	Sipahi Maqbool Hussain	Maqbool Hussain	PTV Home	Leading role
2009	Ishq Ki Inteha	Shehzad	Geo Entertainment	Leading role
2009	Azar Ki Ayegi Baraat	Azar Chaudhary	Geo Entertainment	Leading role
2010	Gumshuda		PTV Home	Supporting role
2010	Dolly Ki Ayegi Baraat	Azar Chaudhary	Geo Entertainment	Supporting role
2012	Nikhar Gaye Gulab Sarai		Hum TV	Supporting role
2012	Ek Tamana Lahasil Si	Ali	Hum TV	Supporting role
2012	Love Ki Kichdi	Hasaan	ARY Digital	Supporting role
2012	Meri Behen Meri Dewarani		ARY Digital	Supporting role
2013	Ek Nazer Meri Taraf		Geo Entertainment	Supporting role
2013	Talkhiyan	Baloo	Express Entertainment	Supporting role
2013	Kankar	Adnan	Hum TV	Supporting role
2014	Kisey Apna Kahain		Hum TV	Supporting role
2014	Mere Meherban	Ayaan	Hum TV	Supporting role
2014	Rasam	Shehzad	Geo Entertainment	Supporting role
2014	Na Katro Pankh Mere	Rehan	ARY Digital	Supporting role
2015	Tum Mere Pass Raho	Tariq	Hum TV	Supporting role
2015	Anaya Tumhari Hui	Sheharyaar	Geo Entertainment	Leading role
2016	Muntazir	Bilal	Play Entertainment	Leading role
2017	Sun Yara	Mustafa Khan	ARY Digital	Supporting role
2017	Seeta Bagri	Akash Chopra	TV One	Leading role
2017	Pinjra	Jahanzaib Mazari	A-Plus Entertainment	Supporting role
2020-2021	Aulaad	Khurram	ARY Digital	Leading role
2021	Sila-e-Mohabbat	Anwar	Hum TV	Supporting role
2021	Mein Hari Piya	Waqar	ARY Digital	Supporting role
2022	Pyar Deewangi Hai	Iqbal	ARY Digital	Supporting role
2022	Dushman	Waris	PTV Home	Leading role
2023	Dagh e Dil		Hum TV	Supporting role
2023	Jhok Sarkar		Hum TV	Supporting role
2024	Duniyapur	Nawab Farhad	Green Entertainment	Supporting role
2024	Faraar	Malik Jabbar	Green Entertainment	Supporting role
2025	Ishq Di Chashni	Ramzan Butt	Green Entertainment	Supporting role
2025	Sher	Wajahat	ARY Digital	Supporting role
2025	Main Zameen Tu Aasmaan	Sufiyan Sultan	Green Entertainment	Supporting role
