= Sher Dil (Pakistani film) =

1990 film

- Directed by: Hasan Askari; Shahid Khuram (dialogue)
- Written by: Rasheed Sajid
- Produced by: Haji Faqueer Mohammad; Rasheed Sajid
- Starring: Sultan Rahi; Mustafa Qureshi; Gori; Munaza Sheikh; Ali Abbas; Shahida Mini; Adeeb; Humayun Qureshi; Shahida Mini; Bahar Begum; Rashid Mehmood; Altaf Khan; Shakeel
- Cinematography: Irshad Ahmad
- Edited by: Z. A Zulfi
- Music by: Wajahat Attre
- Production companies: Pak Nishan Films; Shah Noor Studio; International Studio, (Karachi).
- Release date: 21 December 1990 (Pakistan)
- Running time: 160 minutes
- Country: Pakistan
- Language: Punjabi

Sher Dil (Urdu/Punjabi: شیر دل "Lionheart") is a 1990 Pakistani action film, directed by Hasan Askari and produced by Rasheed Sajid. The film stars Sultan Rahi, Gori, Adeeb and Mustafa Qureshi.

== Cast ==
- Sultan Rahi - Noori
- Mustafa Qureshi - (police officer) Ikram Ullah Khan Niazi
- Gori - (love interest of Noori)
- Ali Abbas - Haidari
- Shahida Mini
- Munaza Sheikh (sister) Noori
- Haq Nawaz
- Rashid Mehmood - Master Ji
- Humayun Qureshi - Jemy
- Altaf Khan - Jageerdar
- Adeeb
- Bahar
- Akhtar Shad
- Zahir Shah
- Sher Khan
- Raseela

== Music ==
The music of the film is by Wajahat Attre. The lyrics are penned by Waris Ludhianvi and performed by singers Noor Jehan and Humaira Channa.

No.	Title	Artist(s)	Length
1.	"Pyar Karo Pyar De Nal"	Humaira Channa	4:00
2.	"Yaari Laani Ay Te Pakki Pakki La"	Noor Jehan	4:15
3.	"Kuj Such Me Zalma"	Noor Jehan	3:59
4.	"Sham Deewani Jawani Mastani"	Humaira Channa	4:51
5.	"Har Weley Aya Kar Yaar"	Noor Jehan	5:35
