= Claude Hilton Keith =

British-Canadian aviator

- Born: 21 October 1890; Qu'Appelle, Saskatchewan, Canada
- Died: 18 November 1946 (aged 56); Surrey, England
- Military career
- Allegiance: United Kingdom
- Branch: Royal Naval Air Service (1915–18); Royal Air Force (1918–43)
- Service years: 1915–1943
- Rank: Group Captain
- Commands: RAF Central Gunnery School; Picton Gunnery School; President Aircrew Selection Board; RAF Marham; RAF Worthy Down; No. 6 Squadron RAF
- Conflicts: First World War; Second World War

Group Captain Claude Hilton Keith (21 October 1890 – 18 November 1946) was a British-Canadian aviator who was an early pioneer of air gunnery, playing a central role in the preparation of the Royal Air Force (RAF) for the Second World War. His work as Assistant Director of Armament Research and Development with responsibility for armament led to the establishment of the "Air Fighting Committee" in 1934. His career ended prematurely after championing the rights of RAF personnel posted in Canada.

== Early life ==
Claude H. Keith was born in Qu'Appelle, Saskatchewan, Canada in 1890 to English parents Hilton Keith and Ellen Mary Katharine Rogers. He was baptised in Cornwall in 1891 and was living with his grandparents in 1901 in London. His father was an Indian Agent in the Touchwood Hills. He trained as an electrical engineer with Marconi's Wireless Telegraph Company, and was present at Dover in 1909 as Bleriot landed after completing the first air crossing of the English Channel. In 1910 he travelled to Fiji to establish three new radio stations. In 1912 he made his first flight with Hubert Spencer in a dual control box kite.

== Military career ==
Keith joined the Royal Naval Air Service in 1915 and qualified on seaplanes in 1916. As a probationary flight officer he was charged with "endangering one of His Majesty's aircraft" by looping the loop and a year later was teaching this as part of basic training. He became a Seaplane Group Navigational Officer, and after the RNAS was amalgamated with the Royal Flying Corps in 1918, was commissioned in the RAF and became a specialist in navigation and armament at the School of Naval Co-operation and Aerial Navigation where he drafted the syllabus for the RAF's first Long Range Navigation course before taking it himself. He was subsequently attached to No. 230 Squadron in 1922 as a flight lieutenant.

=== Interwar years ===
Keith was appointed chief instructor of the first Royal Air Force armament school at Eastchurch in 1925. In 1926 he was assigned to No. 70 Squadron in Iraq flying Vickers Vernon and Vickers Victoria bomber/transport aircraft. Since 1919 the RAF had been engaged in first large scale attempt at colonial control through air power. Lord Trenchard promised that the RAF could control Iraq with air squadrons and a few armoured car squadrons, supported by locally recruited troops led by a few British troops, at a fraction of the cost of a large army garrison. Throughout the 1920s and 1930s, the RAF was used to quell minor rebellions and tribal banditry by swiftly punishing the culprits from the air. In 1927 he was part of an RAF team on the Trans Oman Expedition aimed at securing air routes which were viewed as vital in securing communication and control over British Empire territories.

As squadron leader Keith commanded No. 6 (Army Co-operation) Squadron equipped with Bristol F.2 Fighter's between 1928 and 1930 operating in Northern Iraq. During this time his emphasis on gunnery skills led to the first ever 100% of bullets on target being achieved by Flying Officer C.H. Evans, with 11 of 12 pilots in his squadron becoming 'Hundred-Percenters' and receiving a letter of congratulations from Lord Trenchard, the Chief of the Air Staff. The squadron was briefly assigned to Egypt to quell riots between the Arab and Jewish communities in Palestine.

==== Aircraft armament ====
From 1930 to 1933 Keith was in charge of the design of all bombs at the Woolwich Arsenal. In September 1933 Wing Commander C. H. Keith joined the Air Ministry as an Assistant Director of Armament Research and Development with responsibility for armament. His role in the arming of the RAF over the next three years led to key decisions that were critical for the success of the RAF in the battle of Britain. In July 1934 after meetings with Air Commodore Arthur Tedder he organised an informal conference to consider air gunnery which led to the formation of the 'Air Fighting Committee' on which Keith served till 1936. Keith and his team presented their work showing that future aircraft should carry eight machine guns capable of firing at least 1,000 rounds per minute. Both the number of guns and the rate of fire was seen as revolutionary at a time when many officers thought four guns were adequate and Air Marshal Brooke-Popham is famously quoted as saying "I think eight guns is going a bit far With the support of Air Marshall Arthur Tedder the decision was made. Further input from Keith and his team led to the decision to replace the English Vickers machine gun with the more reliable American Browning machine guns and to adapt these to RAF use. The Browning became the main armament for Supermarine Spitfires and Hawker Hurricanes in the Battle of Britain. Having used slow motion film to record the penetration of bombs it was Keith who arranged the first such evaluation of machine guns. He was also actively engaged in the development and trials of suitable ammunition. These guns used the same bullets as a rifle and the need for a more powerful weapon had long been recognised.

Keith played a key role in the decision to introduce the French designed Hispano 20 mm cannon after a visit to France in 1936. The Hispano cannon was then made under license in Britain and was first used in 1940. Early trials in Hurricanes and Spitfires found that the gun could jam during combat but after modifications it became standard armament in later fighters. The Hispano proved to be a good 'tank buster' and allowed Spitfires and Hurricanes to make effective attacks on ground targets and enemy shipping becoming one of the most used aircraft guns of the 20th Century.

Keith also played a part in the introduction of the Frazer-Nash power-driven gun turret securing the first order of 64 turrets for the RAF. This invention was of immense value as the Second World War approached and fitted with up to four .303 Browning machine guns was standard equipment in British bombers. He developed the training strategy of attaching a light to the guns and instructing the trainee gunner to follow an independent light shone against a wall.

Keith commanded RAF Worthy Down from September 1936. In 1937 he was promoted to Group Captain and published The Flying Years about his early career and his experiences in Iraq. He was subsequently appointed as the RAF member to the Ordnance Board at Woolwich.

=== Second World War ===
In 1939 Keith was Commander of RAF Marham heavy bomber station and aircraft under his command were some of the first to launch raids against Germany. In 1940 he found "An Airman's Letter to His Mother" written by the young pilot of a Vickers Wellington bomber supporting the evacuation of the BEF at Dunkirk to be sent to his mother in the event of his death. Group Captain Keith was so moved by the letter that, with the mother's permission, it was anonymously published in The Times on 18 June 1940. Published as a small book, it went on to sell over 500,000 copies in the first year and was then made into a short propaganda film.

Keith served a short period as President of the Aircrew Selection Board before he was appointed the first Commanding Officers of Picton Gunnery School, Canada, in April 1941. This was part of the Commonwealth Air Training Plan providing Canadian and RAF personnel with training bases away from the dangers and restrictions of training in wartime Britain. Unlike the members of the RAF, Royal Canadian Air Force personnel paid the lower Canadian rate of tax and none at all if they flew more than average time each year. This with other " hardships", produced "bitterness" and "dissatisfaction" among the RAF personnel serving in Canada. Keith presented a list of "20 points of hardships" which he felt "should be removed but got no support. He managed to get six of the twenty points cleared up, but then he was recalled to England in April 1942 despite the Canadian Chief of Air Staff requesting that he be allowed to remain.

Keith was assigned to command the RAF Central Gunnery School at RAF Sutton Bridge, but after a short period of sickness and a recommendation from the medical officer that he should serve in the south of England he was listed as "supernumerary". In the Houses of Parliament on 3 February 1943 Tom Driberg, MP, asked why Keith had been recalled and why it was proposed to retire him, saying; "Is it not a fact that this officer was brought back from Canada after serving eight months, although it had been laid down that he should serve not less than 18 months, and that he was given the highest tributes, officially and unofficially, for his efficiency?" The Secretary of State for Air replied that a policy had been in place since "the summer of 1941, under which senior officers must give way to younger men when circumstances so require" and deplored that individual officers were named. Tom Driberg responded by saying "Is it not more deplorable that they should be treated unjustly?" Keith reports first hearing of this after receiving a copy of Hansard in the post. Within a few months he was retired and subsequently took a post with the BBC as an announcer. His insistence that hardships for RAF staff in Canada be removed led to two meetings of the Air Council and to a final concession of all the "20 points of hardships" he had raised.

"I Hold My Aim" is the motto of the Air Gunnery School and the title of Keith's book published in 1946, it gives a fascinating glimpse into the work of a man who, perhaps more than any other individual can be said to have 'put the fire in the Spitfire'. He writes:

"I ran my Station commands as a dictator – a benevolent one, I hope – and I built the efficiency of my units through the happy, hard work of my airmen. They knew I should bite them when they deserved it, and fight like hell for them when they merited it. I have always refused to be a 'Yes Man' when it affected my doing what I thought to be right for those under me. That is probably why I am in plain clothes, as I write this book."

Sidelined from the official history except for a footnote as the Commanding Officer of an anonymous young pilot Group Captain Keith died in 1946 in Surrey. He was survived by his wife, Mary Gwendoline (née Dunkerley).
