= Leadenham Aerodrome =

Military airfield in Lincolnshire, England in WWI

Leadenham Aerodrome RAF Leadenham
- Leadenham, Lincolnshire

Site information
- Type: Aerodrome
- Owner: Air Ministry
- Controlled by: Royal Flying Corps; Royal Air Force

Location
- Location in Lincolnshire
- Coordinates: 53.057°N 0.568°W

Site history
- Built: 1916
- In use: 1916-1919
- Battles/wars: First World War

Leadenham Aerodrome was a Royal Flying Corps First World War airfield at Leadenham, Lincolnshire, England. It became RAF Leadenham in April 1918 until it closed in 1919.

== History ==
In 1916 an 86-acre landing field was established to the east of Leadenham village for the use of detachments of 38 Squadron of the Royal Flying Corps. The squadron was equipped with Royal Aircraft Factory F.E.2 biplane fighters which were used to defend against Zeppelin attacks. These detachments continued until May 1918 when the squadron moved to France. In August 1918 No. 90 Squadron RAF was based with a detachment of Avro 504K night fighters. By 1918 the airfield had two sheds to protect the Avros and hutted accommodation for 51 airmen. The squadron was disbanded in June 1919 and the airfield was closed.

== Units and aircraft ==
- No. 38 Squadron RFC (1916–1918) detachments from Melton Mowbray Aerodrome with Royal Aircraft Factory B.E.2 and Royal Aircraft Factory F.E.2s.
- No. 90 Squadron RAF (1918–1919) detachment from Buckminster Aerodrome with Avro 504K night fighters.
