= Wilhelm Mayer (fighter pilot) =

German military aviator (1917–1945)

- Born: 5 December 1917; Fürth
- Died: 4 January 1945 (aged 27) near Lohnerbruch
- Cause of death: Killed in action
- Military career
- Allegiance: Nazi Germany
- Branch: Luftwaffe
- Service years: ?–1945
- Rank: Leutnant (second lieutenant)
- Unit: JG 26
- Conflicts: See battles World War II: Operation Donnerkeil; Dieppe Raid; Defense of the Reich; Operation Market Garden
- Awards: Knight's Cross of the Iron Cross

Wilhelm Mayer (5 December 1917 – 4 January 1945) was a German Luftwaffe military aviator and fighter ace during World War II. He is credited with 27 aerial victories, claimed over the Western Front and in Defense of the Reich in 124 combat missions.

Born in Fürth, Mayer grew up in the Weimar Republic and Nazi Germany. He joined the military service in the Luftwaffe and was trained as a fighter pilot. Following flight training, he was posted to Jagdgeschwader 26 "Schlageter" (JG 26—26th Fighter Wing) in January 1942. Flying with this wing, Mayer claimed his first aerial victory on 31 July 1942, which was not confirmed. His first confirmed victory was filed on 14 March 1943 over a Royal Air Force fighter aircraft. In October 1944, he became the acting commander of 8. Staffel (8th squadron) of JG 26. On 4 January 1945, Mayer was shot down by Supermarine Spitfires near Emsland, Germany. He was posthumously awarded the Knight's Cross of the Iron Cross on 12 March 1945.

== Career ==
Mayer was born on 5 December 1917 in Fürth, at the time in Kingdom of Bavaria as part of the German Empire. World War II in Europe began on Friday 1 September 1939 when German forces invaded Poland. In January 1942, Mayer was transferred from the Ergänzungs-Jagdgruppe West, a supplementary training unit for fighter pilots destined to fight on the Western Front, to 6. Staffel of Jagdgeschwader 26 "Schlageter" (JG 26—26th Fighter Wing), a squadron of the II. Gruppe. Mayer made four touch-and-go flights on the Focke-Wulf Fw 190 on 26 January, his first on the Fw 190. At the time, II. Gruppe was based at Abbeville-Drucat Airfield and commanded by Hauptmann Joachim Müncheberg while 6. Staffel was headed by Oberleutnant Otto Behrens.

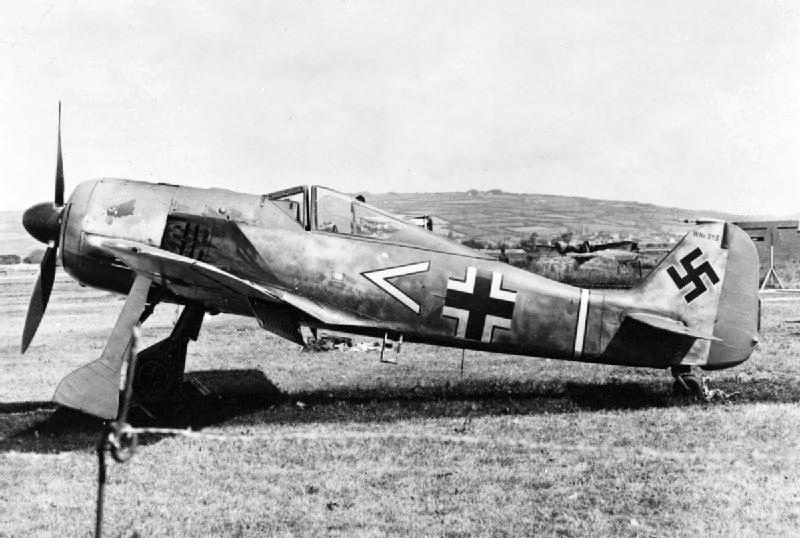
A Focke-Wulf Fw 190 fighter similar to those flown by Mayer.

On 12 February, Mayer participated in Operation Donnerkeil, flying on two combat missions with II. Gruppe, without claiming an aerial victory. The objective of this operation was to give the German battleships Scharnhorst and Gneisenau and the heavy cruiser Prinz Eugen fighter protection in the breakout from Brest to Germany. The Channel Dash operation (11–13 February 1942) by the Kriegsmarine was codenamed Operation Cerberus by the Germans. In support of this, the Luftwaffe, formulated an air superiority plan dubbed Operation Donnerkeil for the protection of the three German capital ships.

Mayer's Fw 190 A-2 (Werknummer 5393—factory number) suffered engine failure on 15 July resulting in a forced landing at Abbeville-Drucat Airfield. He claimed his first aerial victory on 31 July 1942 in defense of a Royal Air Force (RAF) "Circus" mission flown by twelve Douglas Boston bombers supported by the North Weald Wing. "Circus" No. 201 had targeted the airfield at Drucat and withdrew over the Somme Estuary when they were intercepted by II. Gruppe fighters. In this encounter, Mayer claimed a Supermarine Spitfire fighter, from either No. 121 or No. 332 Squadron, shot down over the English Channel. This claim was not confirmed. In late August, Mayer filed claims for two further Spitfires shot down, both were also not confirmed. Depending on source, the first was either claimed on 26 or 27 August over the Somme Estuary. The second, on 28 August, was over a Royal Canadian Air Force (RCAF) Spitfire from No. 401 Squadron. On 6 September, the United States Army Air Forces (USAAF) targeted the airfield at Wizernes with a small formation of Boeing B-17 Flying Fortress bombers. Mayer claimed a B-17 shot down at 18:45 which was not confirmed again.

Mayer first confirmed claim was on 14 March 1943. The RAF conducted a "Rodeo" fighter sweep by the Biggin Hill Wing to Le Touquet. II. Gruppe, under command of Hauptmann Wilhelm-Ferdinand Galland, intercepted the RAF fighters and claimed five aerial victories including a Spitfire shot down by Mayer over the Somme Estuary. On 4 April, Western Allies aerial forces attacked the Renault factory near Paris. Defending against this attack, Mayer claimed yet another unconfirmed aerial victory. The claim was made over a Spitfire presumably shot down 25 km (16 mi) northwest of Dieppe.

=== Defense of the Reich ===
On 29 April 1943, the USAAF flew its largest mission to date, sweeping the Dutch coast from Ostend to Woensdrecht. Led by Major Josef Priller, 6. and 8. Staffel intercepted Republic P-47 Thunderbolt fighters off the coast. During the encounter, Mayer shot down a P-47 fighter from the 56th Fighter Group 30 km (19 mi) north of Ostend. On 13 June, Mayer shot down a P-47 from the 78th Fighter Group 40–50 km (25–31 mi) north-northwest of Dunkirk. That day, the VIII Bomber Command flew a mission to Kiel and Bremen.

Combat box of a 12-plane B-17 squadron. Three such boxes completed a 36-plane group box.: 1. Lead Element; 2. High Element; 3. Low Element; 4. Low Low Element

He was credited with his first aerial victory over a heavy bomber in Defense of the Reich on 22 June during the Battle of the Ruhr. The claim was made over a B-17 bomber from the 381st Bombardment Group or 384th Bombardment Group as a Herausschuss (separation shot) near Antwerp. A Herausschuss was a severely damaged heavy bomber forced to separate from its combat box which normally was counted as an aerial victory. On 30 July 1943, Mayer was wounded and made a forced landing northeast of Emmerich in his Fw 190 A-5 (Werknummer 57222) following combat with a B-17 bomber. On 3 September, Mayer was credited with another Herausschuss over a B-17 bomber near Melun on its mission to bomb Paris. The B-17 belonged to either the 381st Bombardment Group or the 384th Bombardment Group. Shortly after, he claimed a P-47 from the 56th Fighter Group shot down near Creil. This claim was not confirmed.

On 18 February 1944, the RAF flew Operation Jericho, a low-level bombing raid, on the Amiens Prison in German-occupied France. The objective of the raid was to free French Resistance and political prisoners. The attack force of nineteen de Havilland Mosquito bombers was escorted by eight Hawker Typhoon fighters from No. 174 Squadron. At 11:35, Luftwaffe fighters were scrambled from Grévillers. Following the bomb run by the Mosquitos, the commanding officer of the operation, Group Captain Percy Charles Pickard of the No. 140 Wing, circled the target to assess the result of the operation. Pickard was attacked by Mayer and shot down at 12:05, killing him and his navigator Flight Lieutenant John Alan Broadley. Mayer was transferred on 31 March, becoming a flight instructor. During his tour as an instructor, he was awarded the German Cross in Gold (Deutsches Kreuz in Gold) for 15 aerial victories on 16 April. Mayer returned to II. Gruppe in August and was assigned to 5. Staffel.

Mayer claimed his first aerial victory following his tour as an instructor on 18 August during the Battle of the Falaise Pocket. A pocket had been formed around Falaise, Calvados, in which the German Army Group B, with the 7th Army and the Fifth Panzer Army (formerly Panzergruppe West) were encircled by the Western Allies following the Normandy landings on 6 June. Flying multiple missions in support of the encircled German forces, Mayer shot down a North American P-51 Mustang from the No. 315 Polish Fighter Squadron and a P-47 fighter near Beauvais. On 25 August, the day Paris was liberated, the USAAF Ninth Air Force attempted to eliminate the remaining German fighter forces in France. Defending against this attack, Mayer shot down a 354th Fighter Group P-51 near Saint-Quentin.

On 17 September 1944, Allied forces launched Operation Market Garden, the operation to secure a bridgehead over the River Rhine. Two days later, II. Jagdkorps dispatched 148 fighters to the combat area. Mayer was credited with shooting down two P-51 fighters near Nijmegen that day, taking his total to 20 aerial victories. On 23 September, the Allies flew resupplies to the combat area around Arnhem. The transport aircraft were protected by 519 fighters from the VIII Fighter Command and 40 Lockheed P-38 Lightning fighters from the Ninth Air Force. German fighters dispatched by Luftflotte Reich never reached the transports. Over Goch, II. Gruppe intercepted a flight P-51 fighters from the 352nd Fighter Group. For the loss of one of their own, II. Gruppe shot down four P-51 fighters, including one by Mayer. On 27 September, Mayer shot down a RCAF No. 412 Squadron Spitfire over the airfield at Kirchhellen. This is last known aerial victory claimed by a pilot of JG 26 to have been fully confirmed by the Ministry of Aviation (Reichsluftfahrtministerium).

=== Squadron leader and death ===
On 22 October, the Staffelkapitän (squadron leader) of 8. Staffel, Oberleutnant Karl-Wilhelm Hofmann, was injured in a ground accident. Although he continued flying combat missions, temporarily, command of his 8. Staffel was passed on to Mayer as Staffelführer (acting squadron leader). Mayer claimed his last two aerial victories on 19 November in combat with the RCAF No. 412 Squadron. Spitfires from No. 412 Squadron were attacking a bridge at Veen in the Netherlands when they came under attack by Fw 190s from II. Gruppe. In this encounter, Mayer claimed two Spitfires shot down north of Kirchhellen.

Mayer was killed in action on 4 January 1945. Officially a member of 5. Staffel, Mayer led a flight from 8. Staffel on mission from the airfield at Nordhorn. Shortly after takeoff, the flight came under attack by Spitfires from the RCAF No. 442 Squadron. In this encounter, Mayer was shot down in his Fw 190 D-9 (Werknummer 500052) near Lohnerbruch. Mayer's inseparable friend Heinz-Gerhard Vogt, commander of 5. Staffel, was killed in action ten days later. Posthumously, he was awarded the Knight's Cross of the Iron Cross (Ritterkreuz des Eisernen Kreuzes) on 12 March 1945.

== Summary of career ==
=== Aerial victory claims ===
According to Obermaier, Mayer was credited with 27 aerial victories, claimed over the Western Front and in Defense of the Reich, in 124 combat missions. Mathews and Foreman, authors of Luftwaffe Aces: Biographies and Victory Claims, researched the German Federal Archives and found records for 27 aerial victory claims, plus thirteen further unconfirmed claims, all of which were recorded on the Western Front.

Victory claims were logged to a map-reference (PQ = Planquadrat), for example "PQ 05 Ost TE-1". The Luftwaffe grid map (Jägermeldenetz) covered all of Europe, western Russia and North Africa and was composed of rectangles measuring 15 minutes of latitude by 30 minutes of longitude, an area of about 360 square miles (930 km^{2}). These sectors were then subdivided into 36 smaller units to give a location area 3 km × 4 km (1.9 mi × 2.5 mi) in size.

Chronicle of aerial victories
This and the – (dash) indicates unconfirmed aerial victory claims for which Mayer did not receive credit. This along with the * (asterisk) indicates an Herausschuss (separation shot)—a severely damaged heavy bomber forced to separate from his combat box which was counted as an aerial victory. This and the ? (question mark) indicates information discrepancies listed by Prien, Stemmer, Rodeike, Bock, Mathews and Foreman.
Claim	Date	Time	Type	Location	Claim	Date	Time	Type	Location
– 6. Staffel of Jagdgeschwader 26 "Schlageter" – On the Western Front — 1 January – 31 December 1942
—	31 July 1942	15:20	Spitfire	mid-English Channel	—	28 August 1942	14:45	Spitfire	Amiens
—	27 August 1942? (Note: According to Caldwell, Mathews and Foreman claimed on 26 August 1942.)	16:00	Spitfire	Somme Estuary	—	6 September 1942	18:45	B-17	
– 6. Staffel of Jagdgeschwader 26 "Schlageter" – On the Western Front — 1 January – 31 December 1943
1	14 March 1943	17:57	Spitfire	5 km (3.1 mi) west of Étaples; Somme Estuary	— (Note: This unconfirmed claim is not listed by Prien, Stemmer, Rodeike and Bock.)	27 August 1943	20:00	Spitfire	Lens-Béthune-Arras
—	4 April 1943	15:00	Spitfire	25 km (16 mi) northwest of Dieppe	—	2 September 1943	20:30	P-47	Lille-Merville
2	29 April 1943	13:32? (Note: According to Mathews and Foreman claimed at 13:33.)	P-47	30 km (19 mi) north of Ostend	5	3 September 1943	10:00? (Note: According to Caldwell claimed at 09:57.)	B-17*	Melun
3	13 June 1943	14:54	P-47	40 km (25 mi) north-northwest of Dunkirk	—	3 September 1943	10:00	P-47	vicinity of Creil
4	22 June 1943	09:16	B-17*	Antwerp	6	6 September 1943	12:10? (Note: According to Caldwell claimed at 12:08.)	B-17*	20 km (12 mi) west-northwest of Cormeilles; Chalens
—	26 June 1943	19:00	P-47	20–30 km (12–19 mi) northwest of Dieppe					
– 7. Staffel of Jagdgeschwader 26 "Schlageter" – On the Western Front — 1 January – 31 December 1943
7	28 December 1943	16:07	Spitfire	Brailly-Cornehotte	9	30 December 1943	15:40	B-17	22 km (14 mi) northwest of Arras
8	30 December 1943	13:30	P-47? (Note: According to Mathews and Foreman claimed as a Consolidated B-24 Liberator.)	4 km (2.5 mi) north of Soissons					
– 6. Staffel of Jagdgeschwader 26 "Schlageter" – On the Western Front — 1 January – 31 December 1944
10	14 January 1944	11:58	B-26	15 km (9.3 mi) west-northwest of Étaples	—	14 February 1944	16:30? (Note: According to Mathews and Foreman claimed at 16:40.)	Spitfire	Étaples-Berck
— (Note: This unconfirmed claim is not listed by Mathews and Foreman.)	28 January 1944	15:40	Spitfire	vicinity of Grévillers	13	18 February 1944	12:05	Mosquito	northeast of Amiens
11	29 January 1944	12:40	P-47	10 km (6.2 mi) east of Bapaume	—	18 February 1944	12:15	Mosquito	vicinity of Amiens
—	29 January 1944	13:20	B-17	Bertincourt, 10 km (6.2 mi) east of Bapaume	—	22 February 1944	15:45	P-47	vicinity of St Trond
—	30 January 1944	13:15	P-47	vicinity of Geldern	14	24 February 1944	15:50	B-17	12 km (7.5 mi) south of Amiens
12	11 February 1944	13:45	P-38	Vitry-en-Artois	15	2 March 1944	13:30	B-17	24 km (15 mi) northeast of Abbeville
– 5. Staffel of Jagdgeschwader 26 "Schlageter" – On the Western Front — 1 January – 31 December 1944
16	18 August 1944	08:25	P-51	PQ 05 Ost TE-1, Beauvais	22	27 September 1944	17:22	Spitfire	PQ 05 Ost KO-6, Kirchhellen
17	18 August 1944	13:29	P-47	PQ 05 Ost TE-6, Beauvais	23	7 October 1944	16:30	Spitfire	PQ 05 Ost JM-2/5, Nijmegen
18	25 August 1944	19:05	P-51	PQ 05 Ost RG-8, Saint-Quentin	24	7 October 1944	16:32	Spitfire	PQ 05 Ost JM-2/5, Nijmegen
19	19 September 1944	18:02	P-51	PQ 05 Ost JN-5, Nijmegen	25	16 October 1944	14:10	Auster	PQ 05 Ost NN-7/8, Düren
20	19 September 1944	18:04	P-51	PQ 05 Ost JN-5, Nijmegen	26	19 November 1944	14:06	Spitfire	PQ 05 Ost KO-3, north of Kirchhellen
21	23 September 1944	17:34	P-51	PQ 05 Ost KN, Goch	27	19 November 1944	14:08	Spitfire	PQ 05 Ost KO-3, north of Kirchhellen

=== Awards ===
- Iron Cross (1939) 2nd and 1st Class
- Honor Goblet of the Luftwaffe on 8 May 1944 as Feldwebel and pilot (Note: According to Obermaier on 31 March 1944.)
- German Cross in Gold on 16 April 1944 as Feldwebel in the 7./Jagdgeschwader 26
- Knight's Cross of the Iron Cross on 12 March 1945 as Leutnant and Staffelführer of the 5./Jagdgeschwader 26 "Schlageter"
