= 1945 New Year Honours (New Zealand) =

Annual awards for New Zealanders

The 1945 New Year Honours in New Zealand were appointments by King George VI to various orders and honours in recognition of war service by New Zealanders. The awards celebrated the passing of 1944 and the beginning of 1945, and were announced on 1 January 1945. No civilian awards were made.

The recipients of honours are displayed here as they were styled before their new honour.

== Order of the Bath ==
=== Companion (CB) ===
Military division, additional

- Captain (Commodore Second Class) Sir Atwell Henry Lake Bt OBE – Royal Navy (Retired); of Wellington.

== Order of the British Empire ==
=== Commander (CBE) ===
Military division, additional

- Group Captain Denis Hensley Fulton Barnett DFC – Reserve of Air Force Officers; formerly of Dunedin.
- Group Captain Keith Logan Caldwell MC DFC – Royal New Zealand Air Force; of Cambridge.
- Colonel Bertram Sibbald Finn DSO – New Zealand Dental Corps; of Auckland.
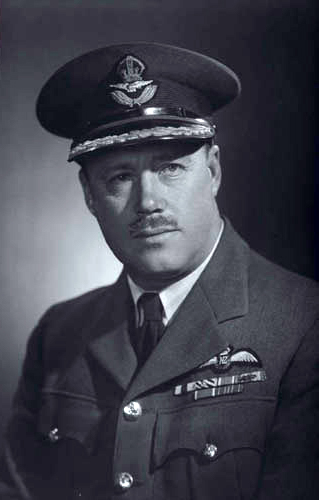
Keith Caldwell

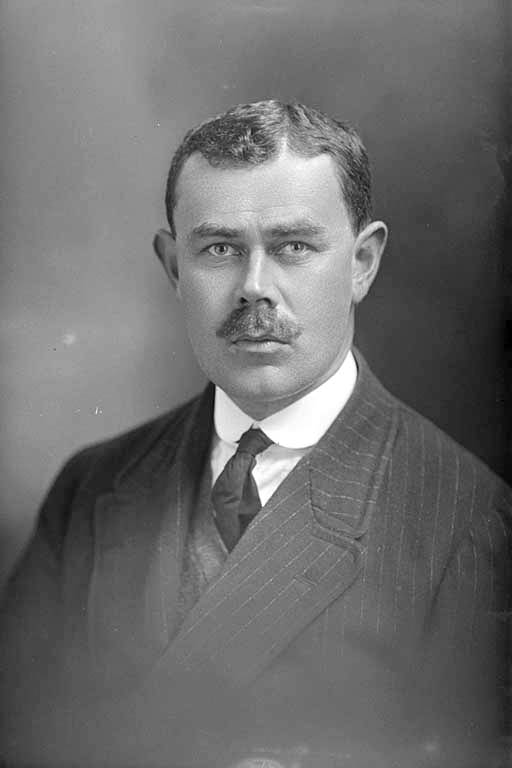
Bertram Finn

=== Officer (OBE) ===
Military division, additional

- Squadron Leader Hugh Tempello Grigg – Royal New Zealand Air Force; of Wellington.
- Major Alfred Lorimer Hogg – New Zealand Military Forces; of Dunedin.
- Lieutenant-Colonel (temporary Colonel) Frank Leslie Hunt – New Zealand Staff Corps; of Wellington.
- Acting Squadron Leader Samuel Jackson Madill DFC – Royal New Zealand Air Force; of Auckland.
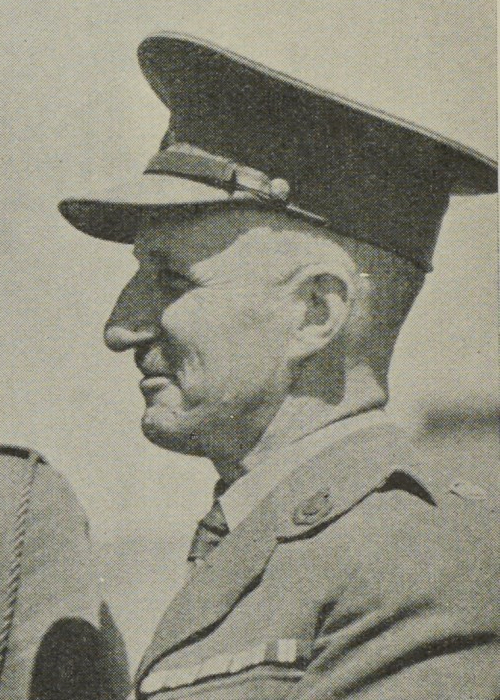
Frank Hunt

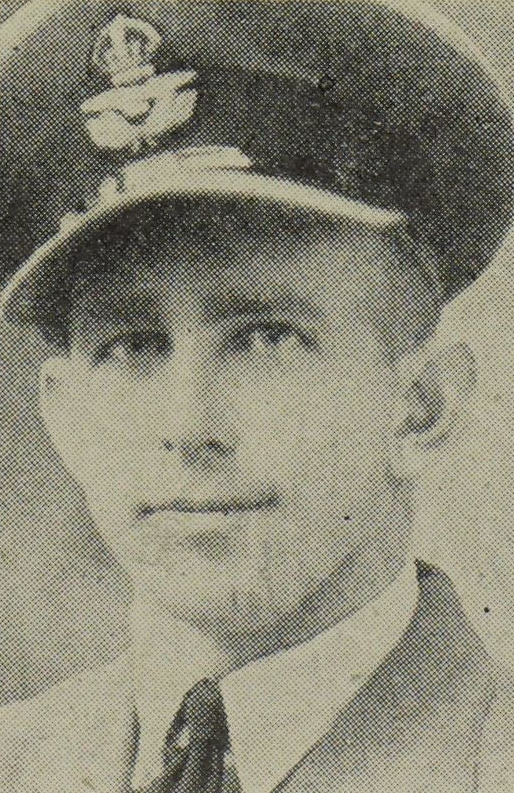
Samuel Madill

=== Member (MBE) ===
Military division, additional

- Captain Kenneth Godfrey Chamberlain – New Zealand Military Forces; of Palmerston North.
- Warrant Officer Aubert William Arthur Crook – Royal New Zealand Air Force; of Auckland.
- Captain Wilfred Laughton Free DCM – New Zealand Military Forces; of Masterton.
- Warrant Officer Robert James Eaglesham Hetrick – Royal New Zealand Air Force; of Christchurch.
- Flying Officer John Pearce Horsley – Royal New Zealand Air Force; of Auckland.
- Captain Lawrence Patrick Kavanagh – New Zealand Military Forces; of Auckland.
- Captain and Quartermaster Harold George Salt – Royal New Zealand Artillery; of Auckland.
- Captain Edward William Desmond Unwin – New Zealand Military Forces; of Timaru.
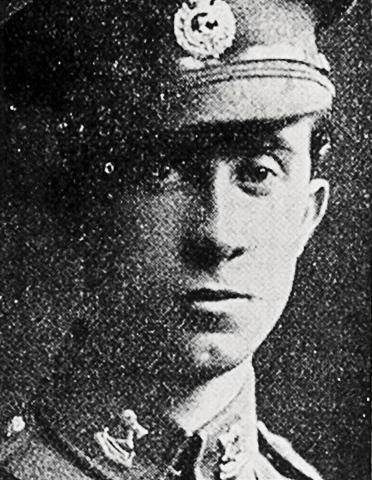
Lawrence Patrick Kavanagh

== British Empire Medal (BEM) ==
Military division

- Staff Sergeant Ethel Mary Burnett – New Zealand Women's Army Auxiliary Corps; of Wellington.
- Petty Officer Edward Clark – Royal New Zealand Navy; of Auckland.
- Staff Sergeant (temporary Warrant Officer Class I) Reginald Wanford Collins – New Zealand Military Forces; of Trentham.
- Flight Sergeant Henry Benjamin Green MM – Royal New Zealand Air Force; of Gisborne.
- Flight Sergeant Mervyn Toyne Bernard Harris – Royal New Zealand Air Force; of Auckland.
- Sergeant Douglas Haigh McGowan – Royal New Zealand Air Force; of Nelson.
- Aircraftman 1st Class Gordon Stewart Parsonson – Royal New Zealand Air Force; of Nelson.
- Temporary Sergeant Matthew John Paterson – New Zealand Military Forces; of Kopu.
- Staff Sergeant Alan George Reynolds – New Zealand Military Forces; of New Plymouth.

== Royal Red Cross ==
=== Associate (ARRC) ===
- Sister Zona May Haworth – New Zealand Army Nursing Service; of Wanganui.

== Air Force Cross (AFC) ==
- Flight Lieutenant William Good Weir Burgess – Royal New Zealand Air Force; of Wellington.
- Flight Lieutenant Reginald William Horace Carter – Reserve of Air Force Officers; of Feilding.
- Acting Flight Lieutenant Cecil Haliday Fox – Royal New Zealand Air Force; of Ngahere.
- Warrant Officer George Francis – Royal New Zealand Air Force; of Hamilton.
- Acting Squadron Leader Douglas Alexander Greig – Royal New Zealand Air Force; of Auckland.
- Acting Wing Commander Robert George Linklater – Royal New Zealand Air Force; of Feilding.
- Flight Lieutenant Donald Malcolm Mackenzie – Royal New Zealand Air Force; of Hamilton.
- Squadron Leader Richard James Robert Haldane Makgill – Royal New Zealand Air Force; of Nelson.
- Flight Lieutenant Horace Alexander Nash – Royal New Zealand Air Force; of Auckland.
- Acting Flight Lieutenant James Frederick Taylor – Royal New Zealand Air Force; of Auckland.
- Acting Squadron Leader Thomas Drummond Webster – Royal New Zealand Air Force; of New Plymouth.
- Warrant Officer Leonard Cecil Sadler – Royal New Zealand Air Force; of Christchurch.
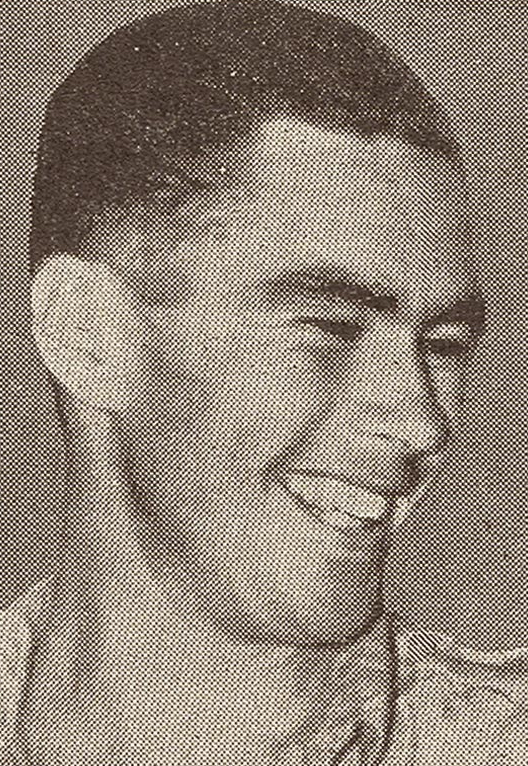
Douglas Greig

== Air Force Medal (AFM) ==
- Sergeant Frederick Walter Mayer – Royal New Zealand Air Force; of Auckland.

== King's Commendation for Valuable Service in the Air ==
- Acting Wing Commander Peter Alister Matheson – Royal New Zealand Air Force; of Middlemarch.
- Acting Wing Commander Ian Reid Salmond – Royal New Zealand Air Force; of Wellington.
- Squadron Leader Kenneth Blackwood Robinson – Royal New Zealand Air Force; of Auckland.
- Flight Lieutenant William Robert Esquilant – Royal New Zealand Air Force; of Dunedin.
- Acting Flight Lieutenant Erle Clyde Robson – Royal New ZeaJand Air Force; of Hokitika.
- Flying Officer Clifford David Lett – Royal New Zealand Air Force; of Levin.
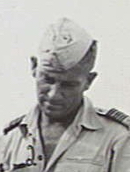
Peter Matheson

== Mention in despatches ==
- Flying Officer John Darral Ackerman – Royal New Zealand Air Force; of Masterton.
- Flying Officer Raymond Jack Nelson Archibald – Royal New Zealand Air Force; of Christchurch.
- Flying Officer John Stanley Asher – Royal New Zealand Air Force; of Dunedin.
- Acting Wing Commander Reginald William Baker DFC – Royal New Zealand Air Force; of Dunedin.
- Acting Flight Lieutenant Kenneth Henry Becroft – Royal New Zealand Air Force; of Helensville.
- Flying Officer Leonard Dalziell Bell – Royal New Zealand Air Force; of Palmerston North.
- Pilot Officer Percy Warwick Blundell – Royal New Zealand Air Force; of Wellington.
- Flying Officer James Reynolds Bowen – Royal New Zealand Air Force; of Auckland.
- Sergeant James Leonard Brash – Royal New Zealand Air Force; of Auckland.
- Flying Officer William Morton Bullen – Royal New Zealand Air Force; of Christchurch.
- Acting Squadron Leader Frederick William Campbell – Royal New Zealand Air Force; of Western Australia.
- Pilot Officer Percy Francis Carter – Royal New Zealand Air Force; of Fairlie.
- Acting Squadron Leader Edmund Douglas Crossley – Royal New Zealand Air Force; of Wellington.
- Flight Lieutenant Patrick Thomas Curran – Royal New Zealand Air Force; of Wellington.
- Warrant Officer Francis Herbert Dix – Royal New Zealand Air Force; of Auckland.
- Warrant Officer John William Gillgreen – Royal New Zealand Air Force; of Auckland.
- Flight Lieutenant Paul Stanley Green – Royal New Zealand Air Force; of Hamilton.
- Flight Sergeant Cecil Roy Griffin – Royal New Zealand Air Force; of Matamata.
- Squadron Leader Hilton Rex Hall – Royal New Zealand Air Force; of Wellington.
- Warrant Officer Robert Blakemand Hemmings – Royal New Zealand Air Force; of Invercargill.
- Pilot Officer James Scott Henderson – Royal New Zealand Air Force; of Invercargill.
- Aircraftman 1st Class Ellis Aubrey Henrickson – Royal New Zealand Air Force; of Auckland.
- Flying Officer Bernard Lewis Hoskin – Royal New Zealand Air Force; of Auckland.
- Sergeant Arthur Francis Hough – Royal New Zealand Air Force; of Lower Hutt.
- Pilot Officer Vernon Roy Jackson – Royal New Zealand Air Force; of Invercargill.
- Flight Lieutenant Clive Fowler Jacobson – Royal New Zealand Air Force; of Wellington. (Note: Missing)
- Flying Officer Walter James Jennings – Royal New Zealand Air Force; of Shannon
- Acting Flight Lieutenant Raymond Kassler – Royal New Zealand Air Force; of Napier.
- Flight Lieutenant Charles Wynne Brunsdon Kelly DSO DFC – Royal New Zealand Air Force; of Christchurch.
- Flying Officer Albert Edgar Larcombe – Royal New Zealand Air Force; of Onerahi.
- Flying Officer Lawrence Montague Layzell – Royal New Zealand Air Force; of Napier.
- Flying Officer Sydney Harold Manning – Royal New Zealand Air Force; of Christchurch.
- Pilot Officer James Alfred McBride – Royal New Zealand Air Force; of Wellington.
- Flying Officer Kenneth William Roland McMillan – Royal New Zealand Air Force; of Auckland.
- Warrant Officer Arthur Dudley Morris – Royal New Zealand Air Force; of Wanganui.
- Corporal Raynor James Murray – Royal New Zealand Air Force; of Manurewa.
- Sergeant Murray Adamson Nagel – Royal New Zealand Air Force; of Wanganui.
- Leading Aircraftman David Erik Ohms – Royal New Zealand Air Force; of Auckland.
- Corporal Michael William Organ – Royal New Zealand Air Force; of Westport.
- Acting Squadron Leader Douglas Haig Palmer – Royal New Zealand Air Force; of Wellington.
- Flying Officer William John Polson – Royal New Zealand Air Force; of Fordell.
- Acting Squadron Leader Brian Roy Quinlan DFC – Royal New Zealand Air Force; of Elgin, Canterbury.
- Flight Lieutenant Lionel Recklaw Renolds – Royal New Zealand Air Force; of Waipukurau.
- Acting Group Captain Desmond James Scott DSO OBE DFC – Royal New Zealand Air Force; of Hokitika.
- Flying Officer John Hancock Scott – Royal New Zealand Air Force; of Invercargill.
- Flight Lieutenant Gordon Bailie Sloane – Royal New Zealand Air Force; of Oamaru.
- Warrant Officer James Robinson Smith – Royal New Zealand Air Force; of Wellington.
- Flying Officer Maxwell Nicholas Sparks – Royal New Zealand Air Force; of Auckland.
- Flight Lieutenant Maurice Spinley DFM – Royal New Zealand Air Force; of Wellington.
- Acting Flight Lieutenant James Frederick Taylor – Royal New Zealand Air Force; of Auckland.
- Flight Lieutenant Royd Asquith Wadham – Royal New Zealand Air Force; of Auckland.
- Flying Officer Robert James Wallace – Royal New Zealand Air Force; of Wellington.
- Acting Wing Commander Jack Edmund Watts – Royal New Zealand Air Force; of Marton.
- Acting Wing Commander Ronald Graham Watts – Royal New Zealand Air Force; of Auckland.
- Flying Officer James George Wilson – Royal New Zealand Air Force; of Timaru.
- Sergeant Edwin Worsdale – Royal New Zealand Air Force; of Wellington.
- Flight Lieutenant Hugh James Wright – Royal New Zealand Air Force; of Masterton.
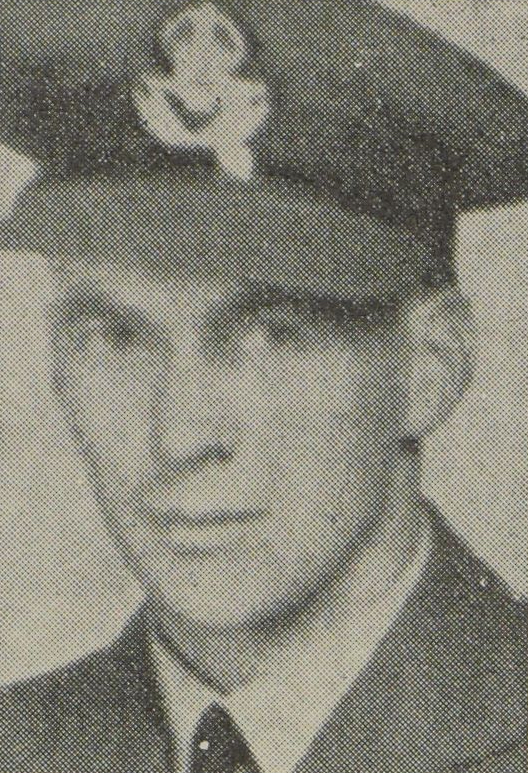
Reg Baker

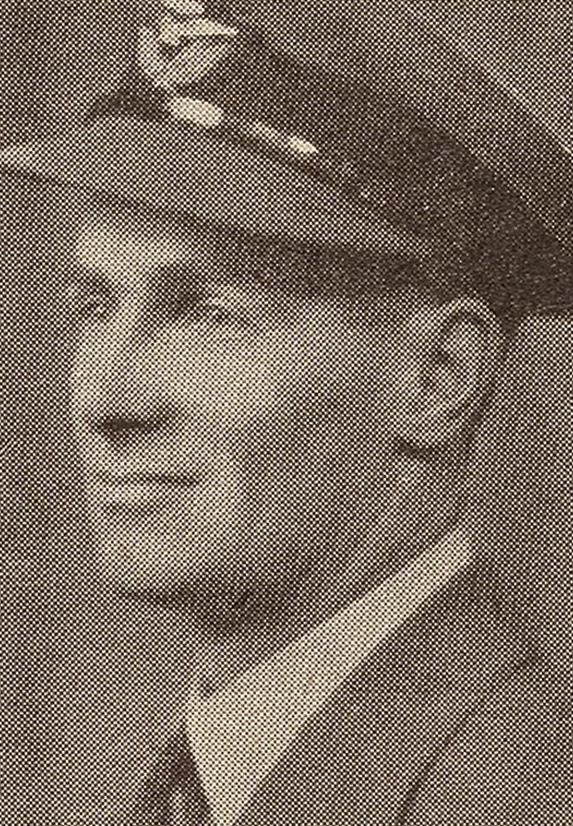
Kenneth Becroft

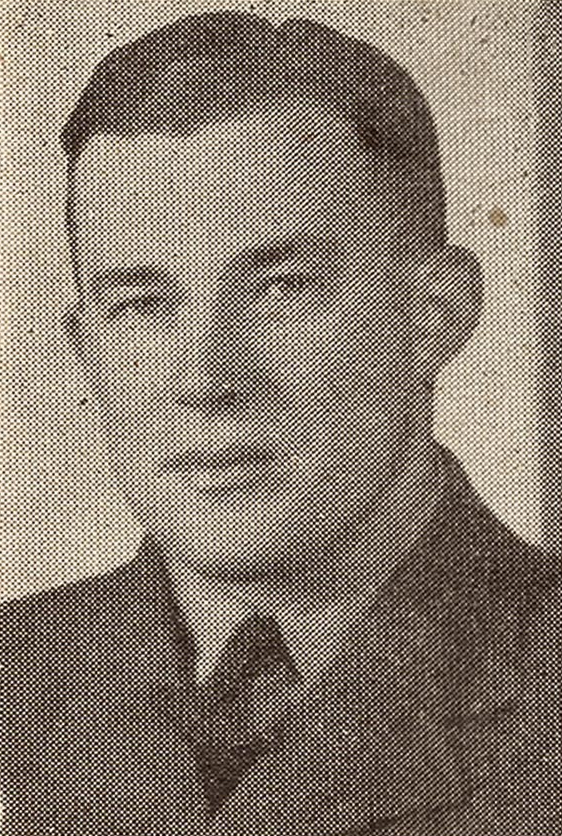
Hilton Hall

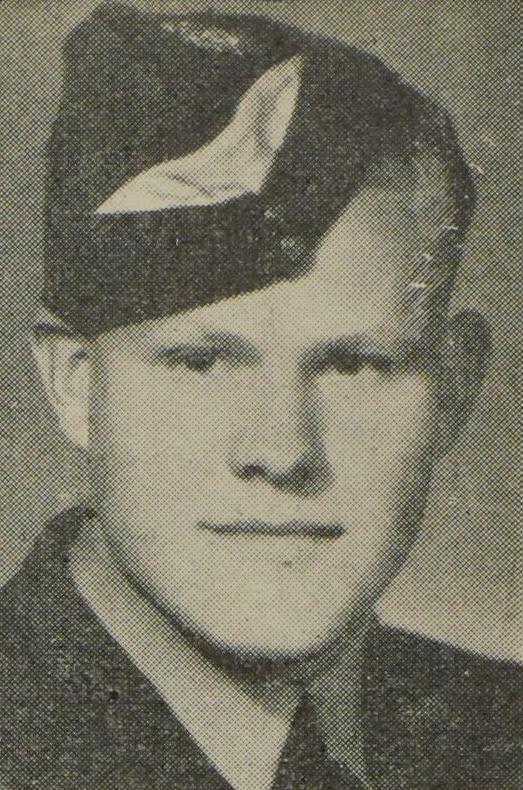
Charles Kelly

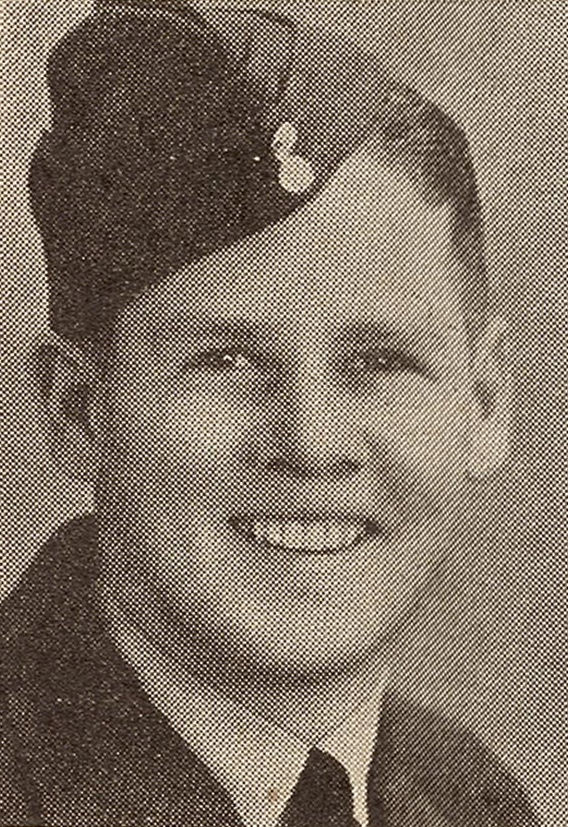
Brian Quinlan

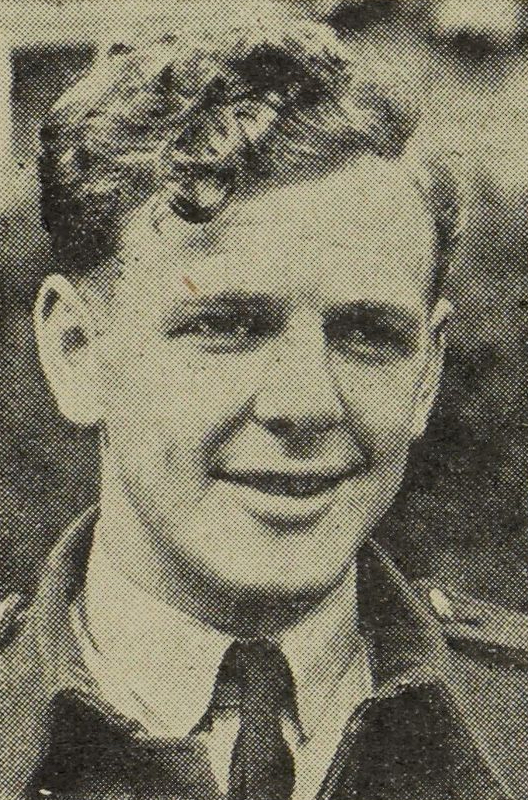
Desmond Scott

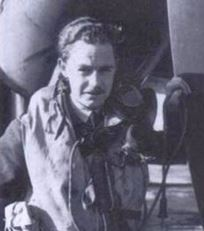
Maxwell Sparks
