= Karl-Wilhelm Hofmann =

German fighter ace and Knight's Cross recipient

- Born: 24 March 1921; Reichelsheim, Germany
- Died: 26 March 1945 (aged 24); Bissel, Germany
- Cause of death: Killed in action
- Military career
- Allegiance: Nazi Germany
- Branch: Luftwaffe
- Service years: ?–1945
- Rank: Oberleutnant (first lieutenant)
- Unit: JG 26
- Commands: 8./JG 26, 5./JG 26
- Conflicts: See battles World War II: Eastern Front; Western Front; Defense of the Reich; Operation Overlord; Battle of Arnhem; Operation Bodenplatte
- Awards: Knight's Cross of the Iron Cross

Karl-Wilhelm Hofmann (24 March 1921 – 26 March 1945) was a German Luftwaffe military aviator and fighter ace during World War II who is credited with 44 aerial victories, which were achieved during 260 combat missions. All but one of his victories were claimed over the Western Front and in Defence of the Reich.

Born in Reichelsheim, Hofmann grew up in the Weimar Republic and then in Nazi Germany. He joined the military service in the Luftwaffe and was trained as a fighter pilot. After his flight training, he was posted to Jagdgeschwader 26 "Schlageter" (JG 26—26th Fighter Wing) in June 1942. Flying with this wing, Hofmann claimed his first aerial victory on 11 October 1942 on the Western Front over a Royal Air Force fighter aircraft. In early 1943, elements of JG 26 were moved to the Eastern Front where Hofmann claimed one Soviet aircraft destroyed. His unit redeployed to the Western Front in June 1943. In February 1944, he was appointed squadron leader of 8. Staffel (8th squadron) of JG 26 and was awarded the Knight's Cross of the Iron Cross on 24 October 1944 for 40 aerial victories claimed. In January 1945, he was transferred to take command of 5. Staffel of JG 26. On 26 March 1945, Hofmann was killed in action by friendly fire.

== Early life ==
Hofmann was born on 24 March 1921 in Reichelsheim, in the People's State of Hesse.

== World War II ==
World War II in Europe began on Friday 1 September 1939 when German forces invaded Poland. On 11 June 1942, Hofman was transferred from the Ergänzungs-Jagdgruppe West, a supplementary training unit for fighter pilots destined to fight on the Western Front, to 1. Staffel of Jagdgeschwader 26 "Schlageter" (JG 26—26th Fighter Wing), a squadron of the I. Gruppe. At the time, I. Gruppe was commanded by Hauptmann Johannes Seifert while 1. Staffel was headed by Oberleutnant Josef Haiböck. The Gruppe was equipped with the Focke-Wulf Fw 190 A series and based at Saint-Omer-Arques, fighting the Royal Air Force (RAF). On 11 October, the RAF Fighter Command targeted Saint-Omer with multiple "Rodeos". In defense of this attack, Hofmann claimed his first aerial victory, a No. 64 Squadron Supermarine Spitfire fighter shot down 5 kilometres (3.1 miles) west of Cassel. On 9 December, he made a forced landing 5 km (3.1 mi) north of Watten in his Fw 190 A-4 (Werknummer 5617—factory number) due to engine failure. He sustained severe injuries and was hospitalized for many months.

=== Eastern Front ===
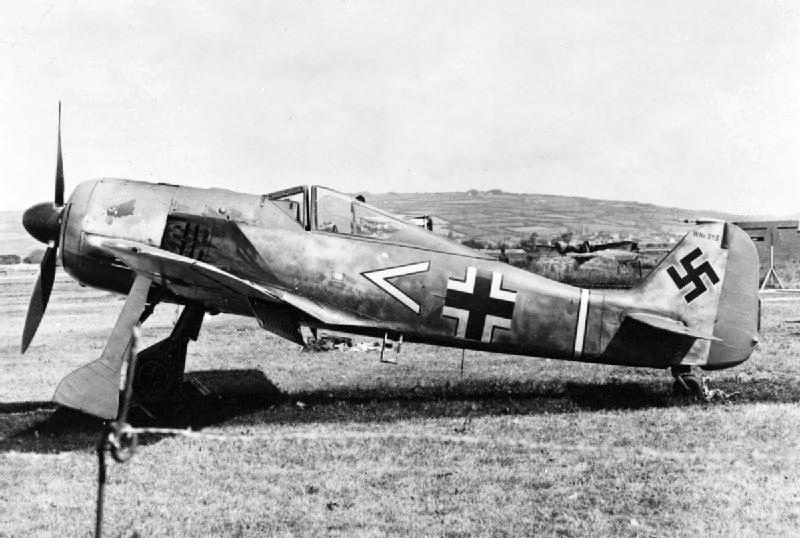
A Focke-Wulf Fw 190 fighter similar to those flown by Hofmann.

Following a lengthy period of convalescence, Hofmann returned to 1. Staffel on 31 March 1943. I. Gruppe of JG 26 had been ordered to the Eastern Front in late January 1943 as part of the plan to exchange JG 26 with Jagdgeschwader 54 (JG 54—54th Fighter Wing). At the time of Hofmann's return to his unit, the Gruppe was based at Dno and fighting in the vicinity of Demyansk in support of the 16th Army and 18th Army. He claimed his only aerial victory on the Eastern Front on 14 May when he shot down a Lavochkin-Gorbunov-Gudkov LaGG-3 fighter in combat east of Bryansk. In late May, Major Seifert was replaced by Major Fritz Losigkeit as commander of I. Gruppe. On 6 June, the Gruppe started relocating back to the Western Front, at first to Warsaw, and then to Brandenburg-Briest and Rheine. Before, the relocation was completed, Losigkeit was replaced by Hauptmann Karl Borris as Gruppenkommandeur of I. Gruppe.

=== Western Front ===
The Gruppe arrived in France on 10 June and was based at an airfield at Poix-de-Picardie. Hofmann was transferred from 1. Staffel to 10. Staffel on 28 September. Commander of 10. Staffel was Hauptmann Rudolf Leuschel, the Staffel was renamed on 1 October and from then on was known as 8. Staffel and a squadron of III. Gruppe commanded by Major Klaus Mietusch. On 18 October, the United States Army Air Forces (USAAF) targeted Düren, but the attacking bombers were recalled over the North Sea due to bad weather. The attack force was accompanied by numerous Lockheed P-38 Lightning, Republic P-47 Thunderbolt and Spitfire fighters which had the mission to clear the coastal area of Luftwaffe fighters. III. Gruppe encountered the Spitfires from No. 132 Squadron near Béthune. In this encounter, Hofmann claimed a Spitfire shot down near Ardes.

On 4 January 1944, the USAAF Eighth and Ninth Air Force, together with the RAF Second Tactical Air Force, attacked multiple V-1 flying bomb sites as well as Luftwaffe airfields in Germany and German-occupied territory. In support of this mission, two Spitfires from No. 501 Squadron were on a reconnaissance mission, photographing the target at Ligescourt. Hofmann shot down one of the Spitfires which crashed near Rue. Three days later, the USAAF Eighth Air Force bombed the IG Farben chemical plant at Ludwigshafen. In defense of this attack, Hofmann claimed his first heavy bomber destroyed, a Boeing B-17 Flying Fortress shot down 8 km (5.0 mi) east of La Calique, located east of Boulogne-sur-Mer. On 11 January, Hofmann was credited with a endgültige Vernichtung (final destruction), a coup de grâce inflicted on an already damaged heavy bomber. While, the 2nd Air Division and most of the 3rd Air Division were recalled due to worsening weather conditions, the 1st Air Division successfully bombed the Focke Wulf factory at Oschersleben. The USAAF lost 42 B-17 bombers that day, including the B-17 destroyed by Hofmann 4 km (2.5 mi) northwest of Rheine. On 28 January 1944, Hofmann shot down a RAF No. 2 Squadron P-51 tactical reconnaissance aircraft near Abbeville. The next day, he claimed his third heavy bomber destroyed, a B-17 bomber shot down north of Lutrebois. That day, the USAAF had attacked targets in the greater Frankfurt area. On 12 April, Hofmann claimed his fifth heavy bomber destroyed when he shot down a B-24.

=== Squadron leader ===
On 25 February 1944, the Staffelkapitän of 8. Staffel, Hauptmann Rudolf Leuschel, was killed in action. The following day, Hofmann succeeded Leuschel as commander of 8. Staffel. On 8 June, two days after the Normandy landings, he claimed three USAAF fighters shot down in combat in the vicinity of Caen. Hofmann received the German Cross in Gold (Deutsches Kreuz in Gold) on 22 July. (Note: According to Mathews and Foreman on 23 July.) At the time, he was credited with 26 aerial victories, 13 of which following the Normandy invasion. On 21 September, during the Battle of Arnhem, Hofmann shot down an unarmed Douglas C-47 Skytrain transport aircraft on a mission to drop reinforcements for the British 1st Airborne Division.

On 21 October, Hofmann, who was flying a Fw 190 A-9, was slightly wounded in combat with a P-38 from the 474th Fighter Group south of Viersen. The next day, he was again injured in ground accident while examining a removed aerial machine gun. The bolt closed unexpectedly, striking him in the left eye. He retained sight but lost the ability to focus. Refusing hospitalization, he continued flying combat missions wearing an eyepatch. Temporarily, command of his 8. Staffel was passed on to Leutnant Wilhelm Mayer. Hofmann received the Knight's Cross of the Iron Cross (Ritterkreuz des Eisernen Kreuzes) two days later.

Oberleutnant Heinz-Gerhard Vogt, the Staffelkapitän of 5. Staffel, was killed in action 14 January 1945. The next day, Hofmann was transferred to the II. Gruppe, at the time under the command of Major Anton Hackl, to take command of 5. Staffel while officially retaining command of his 8. Staffel until 15 February. Hofmann claimed his 44th and last aerial victory on 26 March 1945. His opponent was Warrant Officer C. A. Ligtenstein flying a Hawker Tempest from No. 33 Squadron. Ligtenstein safely bailed out following combat southeast of Münster. Shortly later, Hofmann was also shot down in his Fw 190 D-9, presumably by a Luftwaffe pilot from I. Gruppe. He managed to bail out, the altitude was too low for his parachute to fully deploy and he fell to his death. His body was recovered on 2 April near Haselünne. Oberfähnrich Erich Schneider was charged with shooting Hofmann down and tried at the headquarters of the 14th Air Division, but was acquitted. Hofmann was succeeded by Oberleutnant Alfred Heckmann as commander of 5. Staffel.

== Summary of career ==
=== Aerial victory claims ===
Mathews and Foreman, authors of Luftwaffe Aces — Biographies and Victory Claims, researched the German Federal Archives and found records for 44 aerial victories claimed 260 combat missions. This figure includes one aerial victories on the Eastern Front and 43 over the Western Allies, including six four-engined bombers.

Victory claims were logged to a map-reference (PQ = Planquadrat), for example "PQ 35 Ost 44184". The Luftwaffe grid map (Jägermeldenetz) covered all of Europe, western Russia and North Africa and was composed of rectangles measuring 15 minutes of latitude by 30 minutes of longitude, an area of about 360 square miles (930 km^{2}). These sectors were then subdivided into 36 smaller units to give a location area 3 km × 4 km (1.9 mi × 2.5 mi) in size.

Chronicle of aerial victories
This along with the * (asterisk) indicates an Herausschuss (separation shot)—a severely damaged heavy bomber forced to separate from his combat box which was counted as an aerial victory. This along with the & (ampersand) indicates a endgültige Vernichtung (final destruction)—a coup de grâce inflicted on an already damaged heavy bomber. This and the ? (question mark) indicates information discrepancies listed by Prien, Stemmer, Rodeike, Bock, Mathews and Foreman.
Claim	Date	Time	Type	Location	Claim	Date	Time	Type	Location
– 1. Staffel of Jagdgeschwader 26 "Schlageter" – On the Western Front — 11 June – 9 December 1942
1	11 October 1942	15:40	Spitfire	5 km (3.1 mi) west of Cassel					
– 1. Staffel of Jagdgeschwader 26 "Schlageter" – On the Eastern Front — 31 March – 7 June 1943
2	14 May 1943	07:00	LaGG-3? (Note: According to Mathews and Foreman claimed as a Lavochkin La-5.)	PQ 35 Ost 44184					
– 8. Staffel of Jagdgeschwader 26 "Schlageter" – Western Front and Defense of the Reich — 10 June 1943 – 31 December 1944
3	18 October 1943	14:20	Spitfire	vicinity of Ardres	22	24 June 1944	07:22	P-51	25 km (16 mi) west-southwest of Dreux
4	4 January 1944	16:10	Spitfire	near Rue; Hesdin	23	24 June 1944	21:32	P-47	west of Dreux
5	7 January 1944	13:50? (Note: According to Mathews and Foreman claimed at 13:45.)	B-17	8 km (5.0 mi) east of La Calique east of Boulogne-sur-Mer	24	25 June 1944	15:30	P-38	west of Rouen
6	11 January 1944	13:18	B-17&	4 km (2.5 mi) northwest of Rheine	25	29 June 1944	08:48	Spitfire	10 km (6.2 mi) southwest of Lisieux
7	28 January 1944	13:53	P-51	between Abbeville and Berck	26	10 July 1944	11:35	Spitfire	northeast of Caen
8	29 January 1944	13:30	B-17	2 km (1.2 mi) north of Lutrebois	27	15 August 1944	12:34	P-47	Versailles
9	8 March 1944	14:20	P-51	17 km (11 mi) west of Torgau	28	17 August 1944	16:22	Spitfire	northwest of Rouen
10	15 March 1944	12:15	B-24	northwest of Gevelsberg	29	18 August 1944	08:22	P-51	Beauvais
11	12 April 1944	13:40	B-24	52 km (32 mi) east of Charleville	30	20 August 1944	16:02	P-47	northwest of Paris
12	13 April 1944	13:44	P-47	vicinity of Trier	31	20 August 1944	20:03	P-47	west of Rouen
13	9 May 1944	09:40? (Note: According to Mathews and Foreman claimed at 09:45.)	P-51	13 km (8.1 mi) west-northwest of Turnhout south of Malmedy	32	23 August 1944	13:46	Spitfire	northeast of Paris
14	8 June 1944	06:05	P-51	northwest of Caen	33	25 August 1944	13:53	P-38	west of Beauvais
15	8 June 1944	16:50	P-47	20 km (12 mi) southeast of Caen	34	25 August 1944	19:00	P-51	north of Soissons
16	8 June 1944	17:05	P-47	west of Rouen	35	25 August 1944	19:04	P-51	north of Soissons
17	10 June 1944	14:28	P-47	northwest of Lisieux	36	28 August 1944	12:10	Auster	Melun
18	12 June 1944	06:25	P-47	40 km (25 mi) southeast of Rouen	37	17 September 1944	14:40	P-51	Emmerich
19	17 June 1944	13:35	P-47	Saint-Lô	38	21 September 1944	17:20	C-47	Deelen
20	22 June 1944	19:10	B-24*	southeast of Paris	39	21 September 1944	17:33	P-47	Zwolle
21	23 June 1944	13:08	P-51	northeast of Caen	40	2 October 1944	12:10? (Note: According to Mathews and Foreman claimed at 12:15.)	Spitfire	Kleve-Nijmegen
– 5. Staffel of Jagdgeschwader 26 "Schlageter" – Defense of the Reich — 15 February – 26 March 1945
41	28 February 1945	12:23	P-47	vicinity of München Gladbach	43	1 March 1945	09:36	P-47	vicinity of München Gladbach
42	1 March 1945	09:32	Auster	vicinity of München Gladbach	44	26 March 1945	15:32	Tempest	southwest of Münster

=== Awards ===
- Iron Cross (1939) 2nd and 1st Class
- German Cross in Gold on 23 July 1944 as Leutnant in the 8./Jagdgeschwader 26
- Knight's Cross of the Iron Cross on 24 October 1944 as Oberleutnant of the Reserves and pilot in the 8./Jagdgeschwader 26 "Schlageter" (Note: According to Scherzer as Staffelkapitän in the II./Jagdgeschwader 26.)
