= Operation Jericho =

WWII bombing to save French Resistance fighters

- Part of Second World War
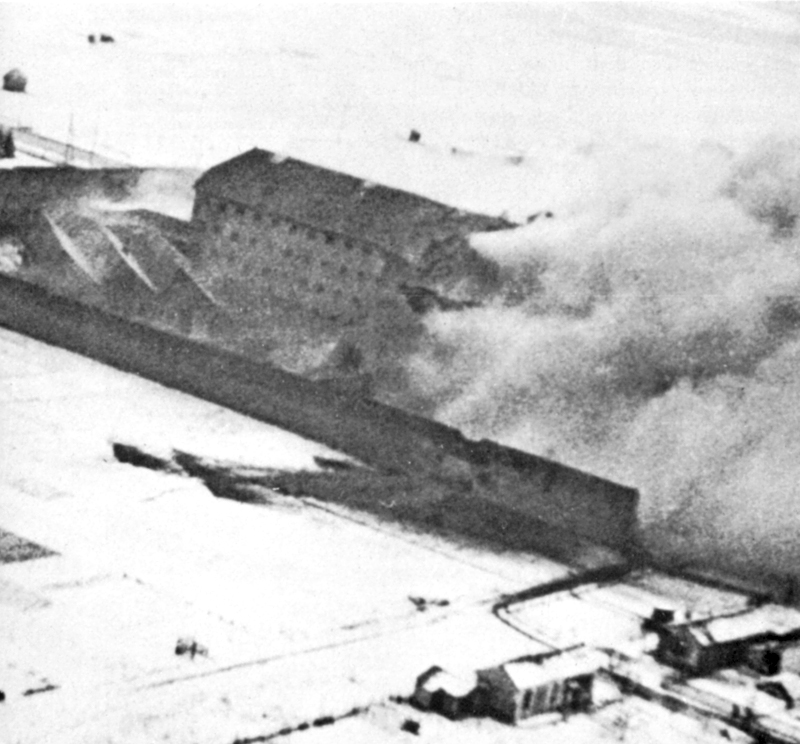
- Dust and smoke from Amiens prison during the raid
Date	18 February 1944
Location	Amiens, German-occupied France 49°54′31″N 02°19′28″E
Result	Resistance and other prisoners escaped

Belligerents
(United Kingdom) Royal Air Force; Royal New Zealand Air Force; (Australia) Royal Australian Air Force; (Free France) French Resistance	Gestapo; (Nazi Germany) Luftwaffe

Strength
9 bombers, 12 fighters	Anti-aircraft guns; 2 Fw 190 fighters

Casualties and losses
Aircrew: 4 killed, 2 POW; inmates: 37 killed escaping; Aircraft: 2 Mosquitos; 2 Typhoons	50 killed
- Amiens, a city and commune in northern France

Operation Jericho (Ramrod 564) took place on 18 February 1944 during the Second World War. Allied aircraft bombed Amiens Prison in German-occupied France at very low altitude to blow holes in the prison walls, kill German guards and use shock waves to spring open cell doors. The French Resistance was waiting on the outside to rescue prisoners and spirit them away. (Note: The eponym is an event in the Book of Joshua of bible when the Wall of Jericho apparently fell down by miracle.)

Mosquito fighter-bombers breached the walls, prison buildings and destroyed the guards' barracks. Of the 832 prisoners, 102 were killed by the bombing, 74 were wounded and 258 escaped, including 79 Resistance members and political prisoners; two-thirds of the escapees were recaptured.

Two Mosquitos and a Typhoon fighter escort were shot down and another Typhoon was lost at sea. The raid is notable for the precision and daring of the attack, which was filmed by a camera on one of the Mosquitos. There is debate as to who requested the attack and whether it was necessary.

== Background ==
=== French resistance ===
During 1943 Allied and German interest in the Pas de Calais increased; the Allies wanted information about the Atlantic Wall defences against an invasion, to keep as much of the Westheer as possible away from Normandy and operations Bodyline and Crossbow against V-weapons sites appearing in the region. (Note: Channel Coast, Dunkirk, Calais, Boulogne, Abbeville, Beauvais, Lille, Arras, Cambrai, St Quentin, Soissons, Rheims, Somme, Ardennes and Marne.) The Germans wanted to keep preparations for the Allied invasion and the V-1 flying bomb reprisal offensive as secret as possible. Oberst Hermann Giskes was head of Abwehr (German military intelligence) in the Low Countries, Belgium and Northern France and controller of the Englandspiel (1942–1944) counter-intelligence operation. Lucien Pieri, a shopkeeper in Amiens, had run a profitable sideline as a Gestapo informer since 1941 and by 1943 had a network of informers which penetrated many of the resistance (La Résistance) networks in northern France. The Gestapo and Abwehr were able to expose many French, British and US espionage and sabotage networks in northern and north-west France.

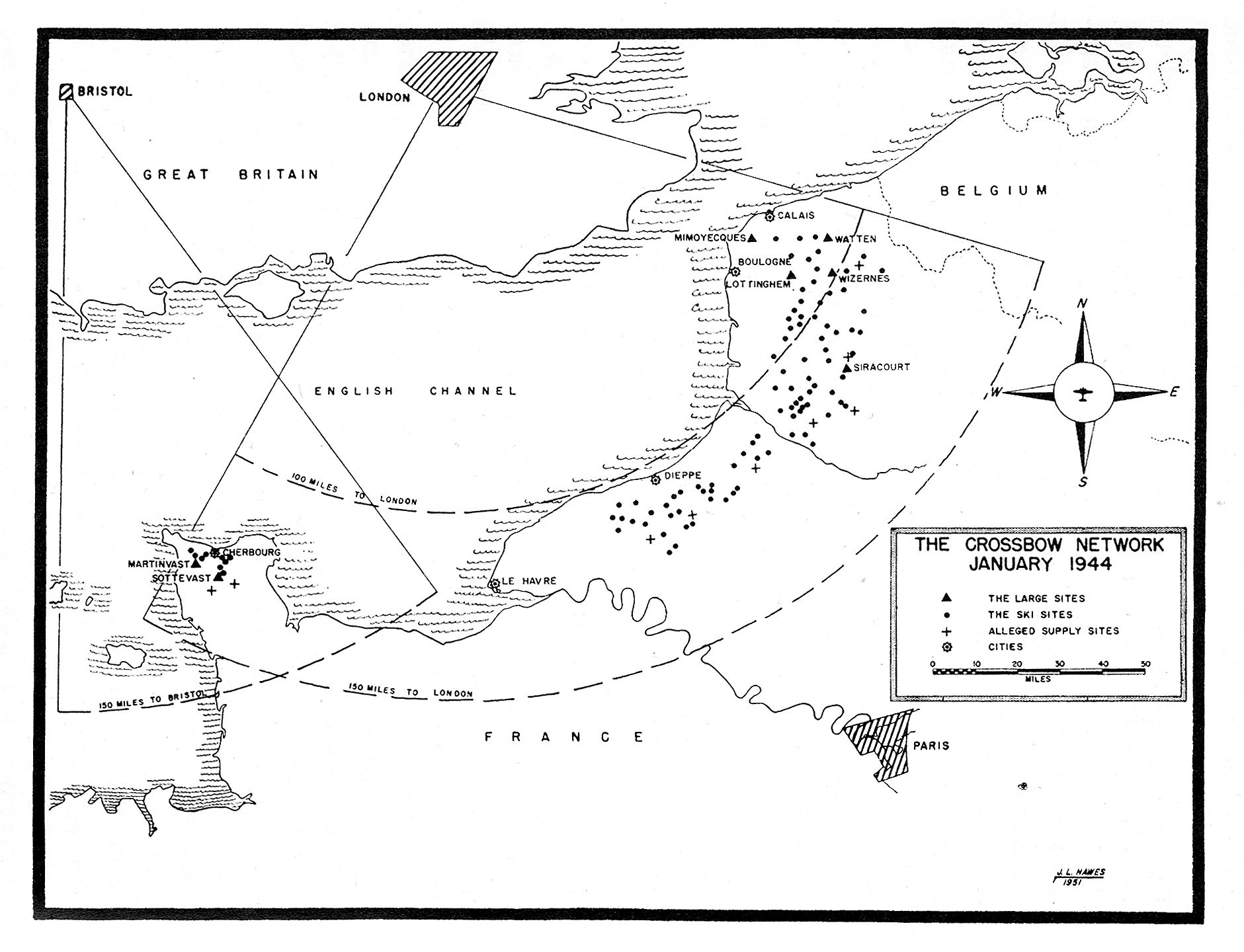
Contemporary map showing V-1 launch sites, 1944

In late October 1943, the capture of the résistant Roland Farjon, a senior figure in Organisation civile et militaire (OCM), began a period of mass arrests of résistants from OCM, which claimed a membership of 100,000 men and women, including about 12,000 in A region (Amiens), Alliance, Sosies and other groups ready for an expected Allied invasion. Prisoners of the Gestapo winter offensive of 1943–1944, taken around Amiens were imprisoned at the local prison where, in December 1943, twelve résistants were shot. On 14 February 1944, Raymond Vivant, the sous-préfet of Abbeville and the last OCM leader to remain at liberty was arrested. Earlier in the war, Vivant had established an information-gathering system in which people gleaned information on the defences of the Channel coast and passed it to village mayors, who delivered it to Vivant for onward transmission to London by wireless. With the loss of so many resistance leaders, Vivant had come to know far too much about the invasion and how the resistance was expected to support it, which included a plan to reorganise the resistance and to expand it tenfold. The loss of Vivant brought OCM and other networks to the brink of collapse.

News that Raymond Vivant had been captured was smuggled out of Amiens prison and transmitted to England. The US Office of Strategic Services (OSS) and the Secret Intelligence Service (MI6) feared the Germans might uncover his identity and extract information from him; the damage to Allied plans would be incalculable. News also arrived that two American spies and a British agent were in Amiens prison, two of them apparently recent arrivals in France. A request for a rescue attempt was made by William J. Donovan, the head of OSS to Stewart Menzies, the head of MI6, which was passed on to the War Cabinet. The Gaullist Bureau Central de Renseignements et d'Action (BCRA) in London was asked for all its information on Amiens prison and the escape and evasion specialists of MI9 and MISX, the US equivalent, began collecting information for a breakout attempt. At all costs, London and Washington wanted Raymond Vivant freed or killed in the attempt.

=== Amiens prison ===
Maurice Holville obtained a permit to deliver parcels to the prison, to draw sketches of the interior layout of the prison and to study the rhythms and routines of guards, to go with the blueprints stolen from the town archives. Another member of the resistance studied the outer walls while seemingly kissing his girlfriend but the resistance failed to discover the true thickness of the outer wall or that its stone blocks were not mortared. The information revealed by the espionage was recorded and the papers were cut in two. One set of halves was retained by a senior member of the Sosie group and the other set was given to "Serge" to deliver onwards. An armed raid was feasible, as had been attempted at St Quentin prison recently, although this had been bloodily repulsed and security increased in other prisons. "Serge" was arrested by the Milice with his half of the documents on him and shot; the Gestapo reinforced the guards at Amiens prison with 80 troops and set up a permanently manned machine-gun post in the courtyard, which made a ground attack suicidal.

Reconnaissance photographs of the prison showed that Building A, the main prison building, was cruciform and 425 ft (130 m) long along the north side, 410 ft (120 m) on the south side, parallel to the main road, 325 ft (99 m) on the east side and 315 ft (96 m) long on the west side. The building was 49 ft (15 m) high at the eaves and the ridge of the roof was 62 ft (19 m) up; no machine-gun posts could be seen near the prison. The grounds of the prison were enclosed by a wall 11 ft (3.4 m) high with fenced courtyards to segregate prisoners while exercising. Intelligence reports put the German guards' quarters on the short sides of the cruciform, drawn in a sketch received from the Resistance. The guards' mess was in the quarters at one end and the guard room in the other. The guards had lunch at noon and many of the prisoners had their midday meal at the same time in the central hall of the prison. Beyond the grounds and 80 yd (73 m) to the north was a trench near a road junction. Building B in the photographs appeared to be a small estate of semi-detached two-storey houses with gabled roofs, thought to be private dwellings; building C was marked as Hospice St Victor. The attackers would have to breach the prison walls and hit each end of the main building to blow open the gable ends. The shock of the explosions should spring open cell doors without destroying the building and massacring the prisoners.

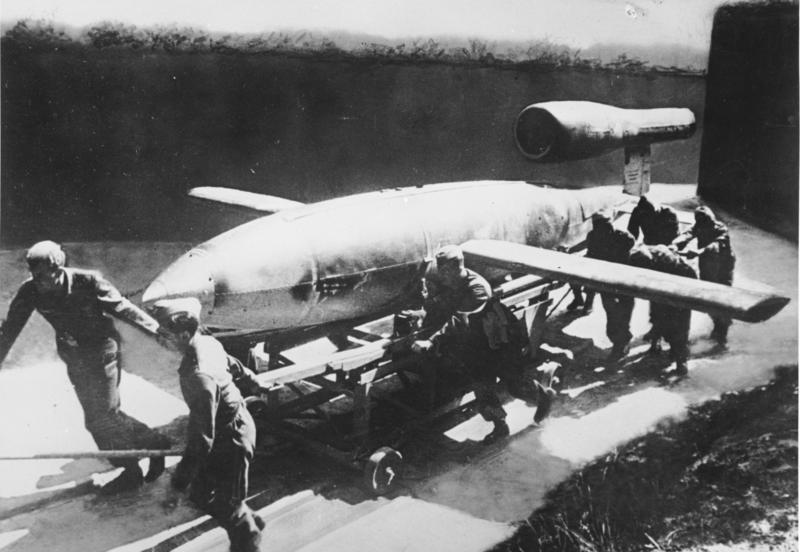
German troops moving a V-1 flying bomb

A rescue attempt of some nature was considered essential to reassure the resistance prisoners that they had not been abandoned, to reinforce the survivors of the recent round-ups with escapees and to recruit ordinary criminal prisoners. The mother of two resistance prisoners got herself arrested and was able to pass on instructions for prisoners to lie down if aircraft appeared overhead and be ready for a breakout attempt. The Resistance estimated that around 700 inmates were in the prison but got the number of "politicals" wrong; such prisoners were usually accommodated in the German section of the prison, where about 100 men and women were being held. Normal prisoners were held in the criminal sections, in such overcrowded conditions that in some cells, eight prisoners at a time lay down to sleep and the rest stood until it was their turn. The Germans put some of the "politicals" in with the normal criminals because of the lack of room and some criminals were really "politicals" arrested for criminal offences who had remained incognito. The Gestapo and the Milice habitually detained people in the prison for weeks before informing the French judicial authorities, which also created misleading statistics; the internal prisoner count on 18 February was 832, including 180 held in the German section. Three British, an American and a Belgian agent were held in solitary, with three Americans captured in civilian clothes, who had claimed to be shot-down aircrew and been imprisoned as suspected agents, rather than prisoners of war. On 19 February, 26 men and three women imprisoned with the criminals and several inmates from the German section were due to be shot by firing squad on the orders of the Amiens Tribunal.

== Prelude ==
=== Ground plan ===
Somme river valley and hinterland, Amiens off-centre

At noon for the week before the raid, the Resistance had about 100 confederates outside the prison and about 16 prisoners in the know, ready for an escape attempt; twelve look-outs were placed in houses near the prison and several fluent German speakers were dressed in SS uniforms with markings recognisable to Resistance personnel. Leading up to the midday deadline, ten gazogene lorries and several cars happened to be in the area, some parked and others passing through; bicycles and velocycles were stashed in houses and shops. The Resistance had several teams hidden nearby armed with Sten submachine-guns, pistols and hand grenades, ready to rush through the prison walls as inmates ran out.

Arms and ammunition had been parachuted to the Resistance to arm escapers. Male and female clothing was collected and an interpreter purloined blank ID cards, passes and official stamps. The Resistance fabricated false identities for escapers; safe houses were prepared in Amiens and far beyond in towns like Arras and Abbeville. A French prison warder sympathetic to the Resistance agreed to sound out other warders and a criminal prisoner had drawn a picture of a master key, made a copy and arranged with a guard to try it out, covered in candle black for minor adjustments, then duplicated. As a precaution, the prisoner was also asked to break into the administration offices before escaping to destroy the prisoners' records.

=== Air plan ===
RAF bases and Mosquito route to Amiens

Operation Jericho (Ramrod 564), was allocated to 140 Wing, RAF 2nd Tactical Air Force. Eighteen de Havilland Mosquito FB Mk VIs, six from No. 487 Squadron RNZAF (Wing Commander Irving "Black" Smith), six of No. 464 Squadron RAAF (Wing Commander Bob Iredale), both being Article XV squadrons. Six Mosquitos of 21 Squadron (Wing Commander Ivor G. E. "Daddy" Dale) were to follow up in case the raid failed and bomb the prison, killing the prisoners. (Note: Born in 1905, Wing Commander Dale was given the nickname 'Daddy' as a nod to his seniority. Pickard chose 487 Squadron to lead the attack as a show of confidence, after a recent incident where he had reprimanded them. The unit was criticised for indiscipline following a fatal accident that occurred when a 487 pilot playing at aerobatics over the base crashed his aircraft into a building. He and his navigator were killed, along with four WAAF parachute packers. Pickard chose the second and third waves by tossing a coin.) A photographic reconnaissance (PR) Mosquito was laid on for the Royal Air Force Film Production Unit (FPU), to film the raid. The raid was provisionally set for 17 February; the Mosquitos were to arrive over the prison at noon sharp, to catch the guards at lunch for the second wave to bomb them. The plan was divulged to the Resistance for them to tip off the underground in the prison and to arrange for accomplices to be waiting outside.

Air Vice-Marshal Basil Embry, the officer commanding 2 Group, intended to lead the raid but was overruled and forced to stand down because he was involved in the planning of the Invasion of Normandy. Group Captain Charles Pickard, the CO of No. 140 Wing assumed command of the mission. (Note: William Sugden, a flight commander in 464 Squadron wrote later, "Anyone meeting Charles Pickard for the first time, as I did in July 1943, could hardly fail to be impressed, very tall, 6 feet 3 inches, blond, debonair, with an easy-going casual manner, plus three DSOs, a DFC, etc., a distinctive loping walk and invariably accompanied by his Old English sheep-dog, Ming. Most of us knew him by name since he had starred in the film "Target for Tonight", flying a Wellington, 'F for Freddie'. We had heard about some of his 'cloak and dagger' operations, flown to the Continent from RAF Tempsford, dropping and picking up agents by moonlight in Lysanders and the longer-range missions in Hudsons; we were familiar, too, with his ditching in the North Sea and the dropping of paratroops at Bruneval. We knew he would not be a chairborne CO, not many were in 2 Group as Embry insisted on almost everyone seeing a bit of the war, even the doctors and padres were encouraged to have a go!) Each Mosquito squadron was to have an escort of one Hawker Typhoon squadron, 174 Squadron and 245 Squadron from RAF Westhampnett and a squadron provided by Air Defence of Great Britain (the part of Fighter command not transferred to the 2nd Tactical Air Force) from RAF Manston. A plaster of paris model of the prison was built, based on photographs and other details sent from France, a common practice in RAF planning. The model showed the prison as it would look at a distance of 4 mi (6.4 km) at a height of 1,500 ft (460 m); attacking at such low altitude needed careful timing to avoid collisions. (Note: Peacetime wedding cake decorators were found to be adept at model building.) Bomb load for the Mosquitos was two 500 lb (230 kg) Semi-armour piercing (SAP) bombs for the outer walls and two 500 lb (230 kg) Medium Capacity (MC) for the inner walls, all fuzed for 11 seconds' delay. (Note: Medium Capacity bombs had an explosive content of at least 40 per cent of the nominal weight and were superior to the General Purpose bombs used earlier in the war, having greater blast effect and being robust enough to penetrate structures before exploding. Semi-armour piercing bombs had thicker cases for better penetration at the expense of explosive capacity. Care had to be taken with SAP bombs because they could penetrate walls instead of lodging in them and could bounce off hard objects into the path of the next bomber.) The first section of three aircraft from 487 Squadron were to attack the eastern wall at 12:00 at low altitude, using the main road as a guide onto the target, the second three to make a north–south attack on the northern wall once the first bombs had exploded. The first section of 464 Squadron RAAF would attack the south–eastern end of the main building three minutes later and the second section would attack the north–western end.

Amiens and Luftwaffe fighter bases (in black)

The two sections of 21 Squadron, in reserve, were ordered to attack the prison ten minutes later, one from the east and one from the north, if the attack had failed to bomb the prison and kill the occupants; if not needed, Pickard would transmit "Red, Daddy, Red" for the 21 Squadron Mosquitos to bring their bombs home. The weather worsened after 10 February, with low cloud and snow across Europe; Hunsdon was covered by deep snow, under thick cloud and blizzards. On 16 February stringent security precautions were imposed and the camp was sealed. Security operatives were based in the camp and others mingled with the public in pubs and cafés, eavesdropped on telephone calls and censored the post. A navigator, somewhat unwisely, called his girlfriend and mentioned "special circumstances", which led to all the aircrew being berated by Pickard for complacency. Thick cloud and blizzards persisted on 17 February and forced a postponement; revised weather forecasts usually arrived in the afternoon; apart from a risk of icing, these suggested that the weather over France might have improved by the next day.

=== Briefing ===
On 18 February, the nineteen picked crews awoke to find RAF Hunsdon still covered with snow under low cloud and blizzards but it was impossible to wait any longer. A more favourable weather forecast led to a decision to risk the operation and the 18 Mosquito bombers and the PR Mosquito "O-Orange" were prepared. The aircrews were woken at 06:00 to the sound of Merlin engines being tested; briefing was at 08:00 and each man was subjected to an identity check as he entered the briefing room. A large box on a table contained a model of the target. Pickard, Embry and the wing navigation officer, Edward (Ted) Sismore entered the room. Pickard spoke first, explaining the unusual nature of Ramrod 564.

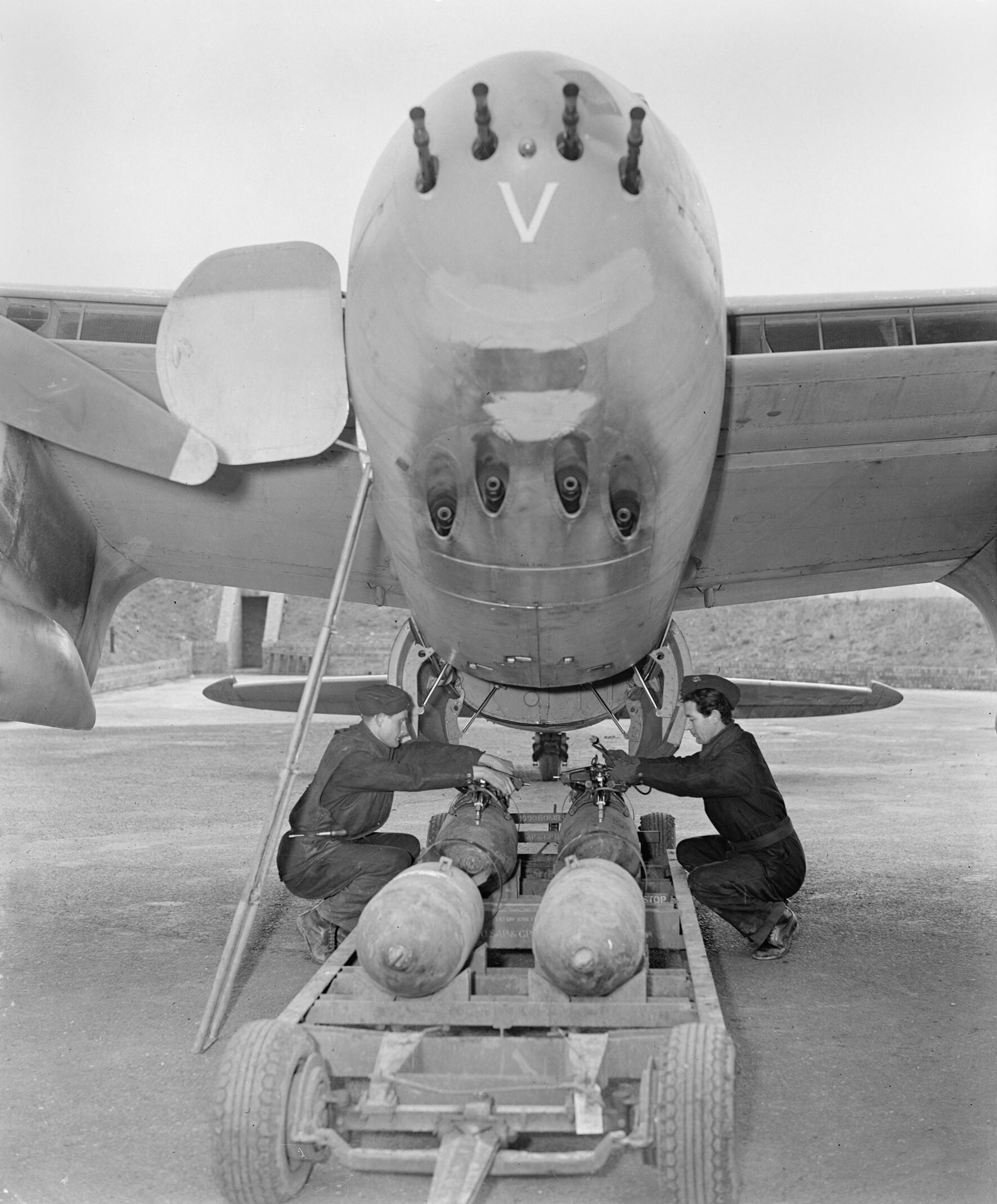
Four 500-lb MC bombs being loaded into a Mosquito FB.VI of 464 Squadron, RAF Hunsdon

We heard the details of this mission with considerable emotion....After four years of war just doing everything possible to destroy life, here we were going to use our skill to save it. It was a grand feeling and every pilot left the briefing room prepared to fly into the walls rather than fail to breach them. There was nothing particularly unusual in it as an operational sortie but because of this life-saving aspect it was to be one of the great moments in our lives.

— Wing Commander Smith

The crews took their time to study the route and the model of the prison; by mid-morning the preparations were complete and the Mosquitos were lined up in their take-off order; few of the crews had flown before in such weather. Pickard, in "F-Freddie", was to bring up the rear of the second wave to assess the damage and to call on 21 Squadron if need be. If Pickard was unable to send the signal ("Red, Daddy, Red Daddy") the crew of "O-Orange", the FPU Mosquito, would broadcast it instead. Rendezvous with the Typhoons was at Littlehampton. The two Typhoon squadrons at RAF Westhampnett were briefed in a rush at 10:55 and began their take-offs at 11:10 without long-range tanks. At RAF Manston, the weather was so bad that the ADGB station commander refused to allow take-offs. Several 198 Squadron Typhoons were sent instead but did not reach Amiens until all but the FPU Mosquito had left for home.

== Attack ==
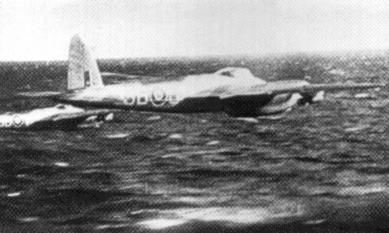
Mosquitos SB-U and SB-V of 464 Squadron crossing the Channel towards Amiens.

The Mosquitos took off in turn, disappearing into mist and driving snow, Smith leading the way with the six 487 Squadron Mosquitos.

The 18 aircraft took off quickly, one after another, at about 11 in the morning - we were going to hit the gaol when the guards were at lunch. By the time I got to 100 feet I could not see a thing except that grey soupy mist and snow and rain beating against the Perspex window. There was no hope of either getting into formation or staying in it and I headed straight for the Channel coast. Two miles out from the coast the weather was beautifully clear and it was only a matter of minutes before we were over France.

— Pilot Officer Maxwell Sparks, 487 Squadron

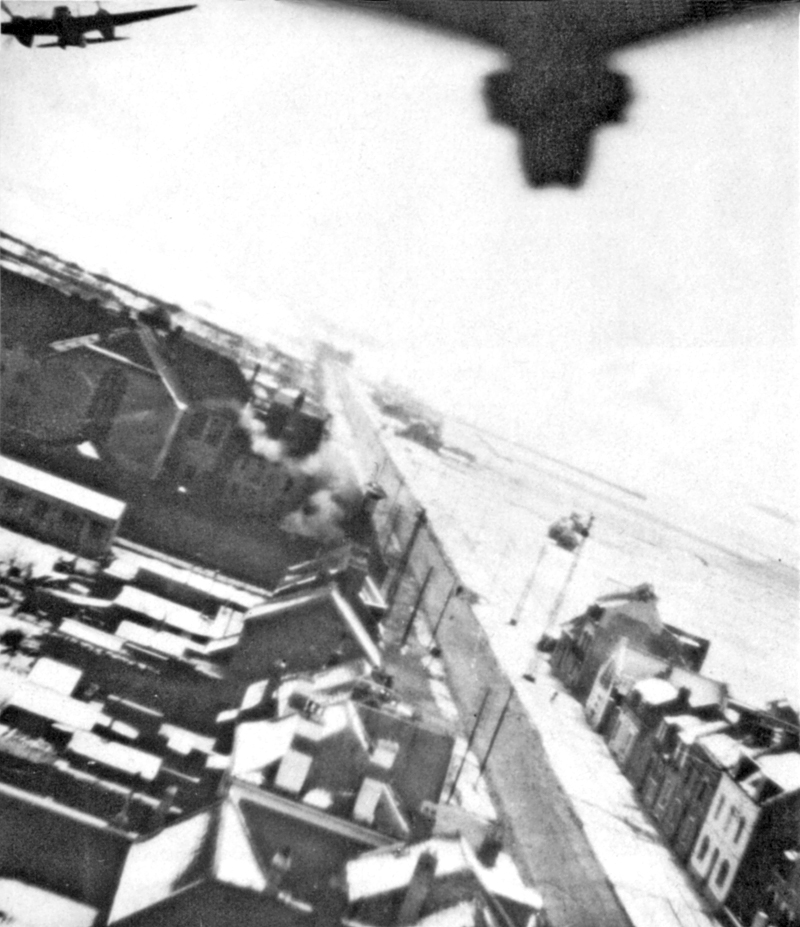
487 Squadron Mosquitos over Amiens Prison as their bombs explode, showing the snow-covered buildings and landscape. (Note: Taken from Mosquito SB-F (F-Freddie, W/Cdr Bob Iredale and F/Lt J. L. McCaul). The aircraft following is MM402 SB-A (A-Apple, S/Ldr W. R. C. Sugden and F/O A. N. Bridges).)

The weather over RAF Westhampnett was slightly better than at Manston and eight Typhoons of 174 Squadron took off, followed by eight from 245 Squadron. The rendezvous at Littlehampton failed in the severe weather but over the Channel, 174 Squadron met four Mosquitos of the second wave, which were joined by another four half way across the Channel. The Typhoons of 245 Squadron found another three Mosquitos, the last of the third wave, two Mosquitoes each from 464 and 21 squadrons having flown into snow clouds and returned to base.

Flight Lieutenant Hanafin in EG-Q suffered an engine fire on the way to the target and feathered the propeller which put the fire out. Hanafin managed to keep up with the formation for some time but eventually dropped back and restarted the faulty engine to catch up. The engine caught fire again and Hanafin had to jettison his bombs and turn back about 10 nmi (12 mi; 19 km) short of the prison. EG-Q was hit twice by FlaK wounding Hanafin in the neck and paralysing his right side; he was in such pain that the navigator gave him a morphine injection. Hanafin flew back through the snowstorm and managed to land EG-Q at an airfield in Sussex. The remaining Mosquitos flew on and saw Fw 190s taxiing at Glisy airfield, not far from Amiens.

Those Typhoons that found Mosquitos continued to the target and flew in a defensive circle beneath the clouds at about 1,000 ft (300 m). Fw 190s hid in the cloud, dived on the attackers and zoomed back into the cloud.

I shall never forget that road – long and straight, and covered with snow. It was lined with tall poplars, and we were flying so low that I had to keep my aircraft tilted at an angle to avoid hitting the tops of the trees with my wing .... The poplars suddenly petered out, and there, a mile ahead, was the goal. It looked just like the model, and within a few seconds we were almost on top of it ....

— 487 Squadron pilot

At 12:01 the Mosquitos reached the target, three of the 487 Squadron aircraft aiming at the eastern and northern walls of the prison. The 464 Squadron Mosquitos were too close behind and had to circle while the first bombs detonated in the outer walls. The eastern wall appeared un-breached at 12:06, when two aircraft from 464 Squadron attacked it from an altitude of 50 ft (15 m) with eight 500 lb (230 kg) bombs, but observers did not see any damage to the prison. Simultaneously, two Mosquitos from 464 Squadron bombed the main building from 100 feet (30 m), also with eight 500 lb (230 kg) bombs. A hit on the guardhouse killed or disabled the occupants and a number of prisoners were killed or wounded, while many were able to escape. Pickard, circling at 500 ft (150 m), saw prisoners escape and signaled the 21 Squadron Mosquitos to return to base. As the Mosquitos turned for home, Fw 190s of 7./Jagdgeschwader 26 (JG 26) attacked them and were engaged by the Typhoon escorts. When about 4 mi (6.4 km) north of Amiens, Flying Officer J. E. Renaud, at low altitude in his 174 Squadron Typhoon, heard a loud bang; the engine stopped and he crash-landed at Poulainville and was taken prisoner.

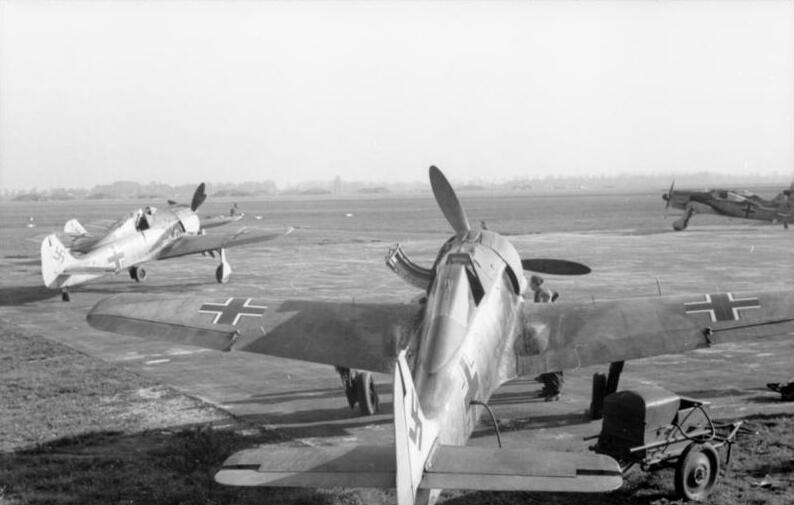
Fw 190 A-0s or A-1s in France

Renaud thought that he had been hit by German anti-aircraft guns (FlaK) but Leutnant Waldemar Radener, the pilot of an Fw 190, had managed to get behind Renaud and shoot him down, his twelfth victory. Squadron Leader A. I. McRitchie, the pilot of Mosquito SB-T, was hit by FlaK near Albert and crash-landed; McRitchie was injured in the crash and found that the navigator, Flight Lieutenant R. W. Sampson, was dead. Close to Amiens, Mosquito EG-T of 487 Squadron was hit by FlaK wounding the pilot, Flying Officer M. N. Sparks, and damaging the port engine; Sparks feathered the propeller and managed to reach England, landing on one engine at RAF Ford. Pickard lingered too long over the target and as he turned for home his Mosquito was attacked by the Fw 190 of Feldwebel Wilhelm Mayer, who shot the tail off the Mosquito; Pickard and his navigator, Flight Lieutenant John Broadley were killed in the crash at St Gratien, 8 mi (13 km) north of Amiens.

About ten minutes later, Mayer damaged a 487 Squadron Mosquito, claiming a probable. As the FPU Mosquito made three photographic runs over the prison before turning for England, the two 174 Squadron Typhoon escorts kept watch. On the return journey, Flying Officer "Junior" Markby, in Typhoon XP-A, on the starboard side of the Mosquito, came in for a close-up. Markby said afterwards that he was relieved that the Mosquito was better equipped to navigate through the bad weather as the two Typhoons were running low on fuel.

=== 21 February ===
On 21 February, four Typhoons of 247 Squadron covered two PR Mosquitos sent to photograph the prison. The aircraft were met by intense FlaK as they crossed the coast, the worst yet encountered by 247 Squadron. Flight Lieutenant C. E. Brayshaw, the commander of A flight was hit and turned back with a damaged engine but parts of the empennage (tail) detached and the Typhoon dived from 700 ft (210 m) into the sea off Cabourg, killing him; two Typhoons were damaged and one pilot wounded.

== Aftermath ==
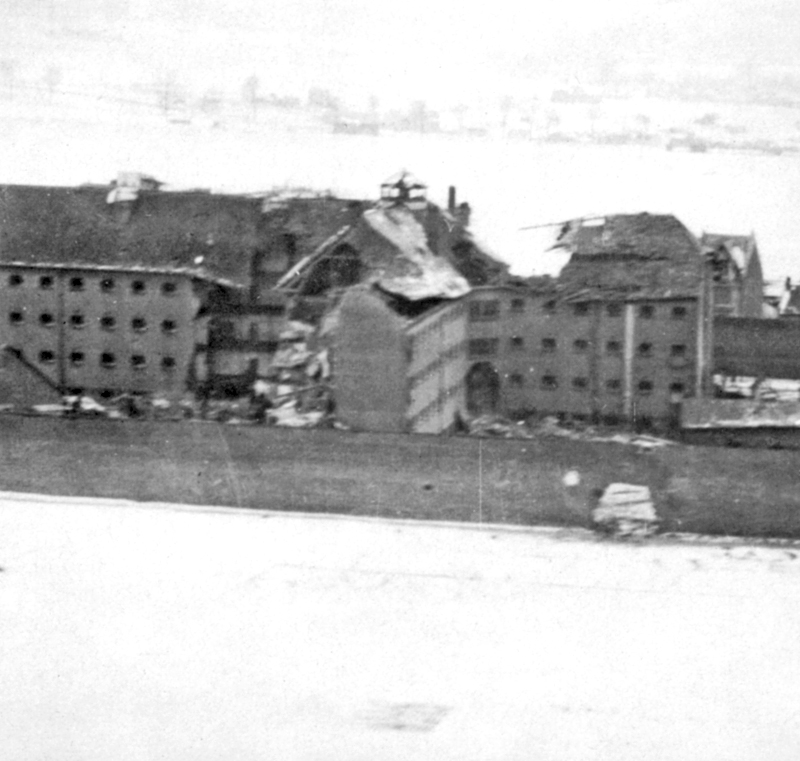
A photo taken two days later shows damage to prison including a hole in the perimeter wall (right-of-centre).

Of the 832 prisoners at the gaol, 255 men escaped, including half of those due to be shot; many escapees were shot by guards as they ran from the prison and 182 were recaptured soon afterwards. Resistance prisoners who made good their escapes were later able to expose over sixty Gestapo agents and informers, severely affecting the German counter-intelligence effort. Ordinary prisoners, not recaptured or giving themselves up, were informally amnestied by the French police and left alone. Pickard and Broadley were reported missing and everyone at RAF Hunsdon was told to keep quiet in case they had survived "but it was not long before we heard news that he [Pickard] was dead" (Flight Lieutenant Les Bulmer, 21 Squadron). It was not until September 1944 that it was announced formally that Pickard and Broadley had been killed in action. In March 1944, Ponchardier signalled,

I thank you in the name of our comrades for the bombardment of the gaol. We were not able to save all. Thanks to the admirable precision of the attack the first bomb blew in nearly all the doors and 150 prisoners escaped with the help of the civilian population. Of these, twelve were to have been shot on 19 February. In addition, 37 prisoners were killed; some of them by German machine-guns. Fifty Germans were also killed.

=== Controversy ===
The circumstances involving the request and the true purpose of the mission are still secret. While it has been purported that the request came from the French Resistance, which had members in the prison scheduled to be executed, a post-war investigation by the RAF revealed that Resistance leaders were not aware of the raid until the RAF requested a description of the prison. The bombing enabled 258 prisoners to escape; several German guards were killed along with 102 prisoners, and many escapees were later recaptured. A (Most Secret) letter of March 1944 for Menzies, thanked the RAF for the raid. When the head of the SOE French section, Maurice Buckmaster, was confronted with the letter, signed by "C", he stated that he had never seen it and that he had not requested the raid and did not know who had. A 2011 BBC television documentary on Operation Jericho speculated the raid may have been intended to divert the attention of German military intelligence from Normandy, where the Allied invasion of France took place on 6 June.

== Memorials ==
A plaque at the prison is dedicated to those who died in the attack and a general airfield memorial is at Hunsdon Airfield, the Mosquito base. On the 60th anniversary in 2004, a Spitfire performed a flypast, as none of the surviving Mosquitos were airworthy.

== Aircraft involved ==
=== de Havilland Mosquito ===
de Havilland Mosquitos in Operation Jericho | Take off 10:51 (Note: Details from Fishman (1983) unless specified.)
Aircraft	Pilot	Navigator	Squadron	Notes
EG-R (LR333)	W/C I. S. Smith, DFC	Flt Lt P. E. Barns, DFC	487 RNZAF	Returned
EG-H (HX856)	FS S. Jennings	WO J. M. Nichols	487	Returned
EG-T (HX982)	Plt Offr Maxwell Sparks; RNZAF	Plt Offr A. C. Dunlop	487	Hit by FlaK; wheel collapsed on landing at base
EG-C (HX909)	Plt Offr M. L. S. Darrall; RNZAF	Plt Offr F. S. Stevenson; RNZAF	487	Returned
EG-J (HX974)	P/O D. R. Fowler	W/O F. A. Wilkins	487	Returned
EG-Q (HX855)	F/Lt B. D. Hanafin	P/O C. F. Redgrave	487	Turned back
SB-F (LR334)	Wg Cdr Robert Iredale; RAAF	Flt Lt J. L. McCaul	464 RAAF	Landed 13:00
SB-A (MM402)	Sqn Ldr W. R. C. Sugden	Fg Offr A. N. Bridges	464	Landed 13:00
SB-U (MM410)	F/O K. L. Monaghan	F/O A. W. Dean	464	Landed 12:50
SB-V (MM403)	F/Lt T. McPhee; RNZAF	F/Lt G. W. Atkins	464	Landed 12:50
SB-T (MM404)	S/Ldr A. I. McRitchie RNZAF	F/Lt R. Sampson; RNZAF	464	Shot down by FlaK near Amiens; pilot POW, navigator killed.
EG-F (HX922)	Gp Capt Percy Pickard	Flt Lt John Broadley	464 RAAF (aircraft from 487 Sqn)	Shot down by Wilhelm Mayer; buried at Amiens
O-Orange (DZ414)	Flt Lt A. Wickam	P/O L. Howard	FPU	Returned
YH-U (LR403)	Wg Cdr I. G. Dale	F/O E. Gabites	21 RAF	Called off
YH-J (MM398)	F/Lt M. J. Benn	F/O N. A. Roe	21	Called off
YH-C (HX930)	F/Lt A. E. C. Wheeler	F/O N. M. Redington	21	Called off
YH-D (LR385)	F/Lt D. A. Taylor	S/Ldr P. Livry	21	Called off
YH-P (LR348)	F/Lt E. E. Hogan	F/Sgt D. A. S. Crowfoot	21	Turned back
YH-F (LR388)	F/Sgt A. Steadman	P/O E. J. Reynolds	21	Turned back

=== Hawker Typhoons ===
Hawker Typhoons in Operation Jericho
Aircraft	Pilot	Sqn	Notes
JR133	F/O J. E. Reynaud	174 RAF	Shot down by Fw 190 north of Amiens, taken prisoner
JP793	F/Sgt H. S. Brown	174	Last seen entering a snowstorm 20 nmi (37 km; 23 mi) SSE of Beachy Head
JR310	F/Lt F. A. Grantham	174	Landed 12:50
JP541	F/Sgt F. E. Wheeler	174	Landed 12:50
JP671	F/Lt G. I. Mallett	174	Landed 12:50
JP308	F/O W. C. Vatcher	174	Landed 12:50
JR303	P/O W. D. Burton	174	Landed 12:50
XP-A (JP535)	F/O H. V. Markby	174	Landed 12:50
	F/Lt R. Dall	198 RAF	Bad weather at RAF Manston; landed at RAF Tangmere at 12:50
	F/Lt J. Scambler	198	Bad weather at Manston; landed Tangmere 12:50
	F/Lt R. Roper	198	Bad weather at Manston; landed Tangmere 12:50
	F/O R. Armstrong	198	Separated from main formation in snowstorm; landed at base, 11:30
	F/Lt Raymond Lallemant	198	Separated from main formation in snowstorm; landed at base, 11:15
	F/Lt J. Niblett	198	Separated from main formation in snowstorm; landed at base, 11:15

== See also ==
- Aarhus Air Raid, attack on Gestapo headquarters in Aarhus, Denmark
- Operation Carthage, attack on Gestapo headquarters in Copenhagen, Denmark
- Oslo Mosquito Raid (1942), attack on Gestapo headquarters in Oslo, Norway
