= Alfred Heckmann =

German flying ace (1914–1993)

- Born: 25 June 1914; Bochum-Langendreer, Germany
- Died: 27 July 1993 (aged 79); Brakel, Germany
- Military career
- Allegiance: Nazi Germany
- Branch: Luftwaffe
- Service years: 1939–1945
- Rank: Oberleutnant (first lieutenant)
- Nickname: Fred
- Units: JG 3, JG 26, JV 44
- Conflicts: World War II: Battle of France; Battle of Britain; Operation Barbarossa; Siege of Malta; Operation Bodenplatte
- Awards: Knight's Cross of the Iron Cross

Alfred Heckmann (25 June 1914 – 27 July 1993) was a Luftwaffe flying ace of World War II. A flying ace or fighter ace is a military aviator credited with shooting down five or more enemy aircraft during aerial combat. He was also a recipient of the Knight's Cross of the Iron Cross (German: Ritterkreuz des Eisernen Kreuzes). The Knight's Cross of the Iron Cross, and its variants were the highest awards in the military and paramilitary forces of Nazi Germany during World War II.

== Career ==
Heckmann was born 25 June 1914 at Bochum-Langendreer in the Province of Westphalia, a province of the Kingdom of Prussia within the German Empire. In early 1939 he joined the military service in the Luftwaffe and following fighter pilot training, (Note: Flight training in the Luftwaffe progressed through the levels A1, A2 and B1, B2, referred to as A/B flight training. A training included theoretical and practical training in aerobatics, navigation, long-distance flights and dead-stick landings. The B courses included high-altitude flights, instrument flights, night landings and training to handle the aircraft in difficult situations.) Heckmann was posted to 5. Staffel (5th squadron) of Jagdgeschwader 3 "Udet" (JG 3—3rd Fighter Wing) with the rank of Unteroffizier (a junior non-commissioned officer) in February 1940.

He claimed his first victory in June 1940, when he shot down a French Morane MS 406 fighter over Abbeville. He added two Supermarine Spitfires during the Battle of Britain.

=== War against the Soviet Union ===
In preparation for Operation Barbarossa, the German invasion of the Soviet Union, II. Gruppe headed further east on 18 June. Following a stopover at Kraków, the unit was moved to Hostynne. At the start of the campaign, JG 3 under the command of Major (Major) Günther Lützow was subordinated to the 5th Air Corps, under the command of General der Flieger (General of the Aviators) Robert Ritter von Greim, itself part of Luftflotte 4 (4th Air Fleet), under the command of Generaloberst (Colonel General) Alexander Löhr. These air elements supported Generalfeldmarschall (Field Marshal) Gerd von Rundstedt's Army Group South, with the objective of capturing Ukraine and its capital Kiev. At 17:00 on 21 June 1941, the 5th Air Corps, based at Lipsko, briefed the various unit commanders of the upcoming attack. (Note: All times used in this section are Central European Time unless otherwise noted.) That evening, Gruppenkommandeur (group commander) of II. Gruppe Lothar Keller informed his subordinates of the attack.

The II. Gruppe of JG 3 (II./JG 3—2nd group of the 3rd fighter wing) was relocated to Sicily in January 1942, and Heckmann flew over Malta without claiming any aerial victories. II./JG 3 returned to the Eastern Front in June 1942. In July Oberfeldwebel Heckmann claimed 17 Soviet aircraft, including four Douglas Boston bombers shot down on 10 July. He was awarded the Knight's Cross of the Iron Cross in September 1942.

=== With Jagdgeschwader 26 ===
In October 1942, Heckmann was transferred to 1. Staffel of Jagdgeschwader 26 "Schlageter" (1./JG 26—1st squadron of the 26th fighter wing) on the Channel front.

In January 1943, the Luftwaffe planned to move JG 26 to the Eastern Front. The idea was to exchange JG 26 with Jagdgeschwader 54 (JG 54—54th Fighter Wing) which supported Army Group North. The style of combat between the two fronts was quite different and overall the experiment was not a success; I. Gruppe of JG 26 was the only Gruppe of JG 26 to serve in Russia. On 21 January, I. Gruppe left France and arrived in Heiligenbeil, present-day Mamonovo, on 27 January. There, the Gruppe received factory-new Fw 190 A-5 and A-4 aircraft. On 31 January, I. Gruppe moved to Riga and two days later to an airfield named Rielbitzi at Lake Ilmen.

In the 14 weeks the Gruppe was based in Russia Oberfeldwebel Heckmann claimed four victories; all Il-2 Stormovik's.

On 28 February 1943, Heckmann was transferred to Ergänzungs-Jagdgruppe Ost (Supplementary Fighter Group, East), a specialized training unit for new fighter pilots destined for the Eastern Front. He returned to JG 26 on 31 July. Heck claimed his first aerial victory in defense of the Reich over the United States Army Air Forces (USAAF) VIII Bomber Command, later renamed to Eighth Air Force, on 14 October, during the second Schweinfurt raid also called "Black Thursday". That day, Heckmann was credited with the destruction of a Boeing B-17 Flying Fortress heavy bomber.

=== Squadron leader ===
He returned to 1./JG 26 in July. On 23 January 1944, Heckamm was appointed Staffelkapitän (squadron leader) of 3. Staffel of JG 26. He succeeded Leutnant Herfried Kloimüller who had briefly led the Staffel after its former commander, Oberleutnant Heinrich Jessen, had been killed in a flying accident on 10 January. On 21 September, I./JG 26 attacked a formation of RAF C-47 Douglas Dakota transports over 's-Hertogenbosch en route to supply the Allied aerial landings at Arnhem. Heckmann claimed four shot down.

On 1 January 1945, Heckmann led 23 Focke-Wulf Fw 190 D-9s of 3./JG 26 in Operation Bodenplatte, the attack on the Allied airfields in the Netherlands and Belgium.

On 26 March 1945, Oberleutnant Karl-Wilhelm Hofmann, the Staffelkapitän of 5. Staffel of JG 26 was killed in action. In consequence, Heckmann was transferred, taking command of 5. Staffel on 29 March. Command of his former 3. Staffel was passed on to Oberleutnant Hans Dortenmann. On 14 April, Heckmann received orders from Generalleutnant Adolf Galland and transferred to Jagdverband 44 at Munich-Riem. Command of 5. Staffel of JG 26 was passed on to Leutnant Peter Crump.

== Later life ==
Heckmann died on 27 July 1993 at the age of 79 in Brakel, Germany.

== Summary of career ==
=== Aerial victory claims ===
According to US historian David T. Zabecki, Heckmann was credited with 71 aerial victories. Spick also lists him 71 aerial victories, 54 on the Eastern Front and 17 over the Western Allies, including three four-engined heavy bombers, claimed in approximately 600 combat missions. Mathews and Foreman, authors of Luftwaffe Aces — Biographies and Victory Claims, researched the German Federal Archives and found documentation for 69 aerial victory claims, plus one further unconfirmed claims This number includes fifteen on the Western Front, including three four-engined heavy bombers, and 54 on the Eastern Front.

Victory claims were logged to a map-reference (PQ = Planquadrat), for example "PQ 08453". The Luftwaffe grid map (Jägermeldenetz) covered all of Europe, western Russia and North Africa and was composed of rectangles measuring 15 minutes of latitude by 30 minutes of longitude, an area of about 360 square miles (930 km^{2}). These sectors were then subdivided into 36 smaller units to give a location area 3 km × 4 km (1.9 mi × 2.5 mi) in size.

Chronicle of aerial victories
This and the ? (question mark) indicates information discrepancies listed by Prien, Stemmer, Rodeike, Bock, Mathews and Foreman.
– 5. Staffel of Jagdgeschwader 3 – Battle of France — 19 May – 25 June 1940
1	6 June 1940	11:10	M.S.406	Abbeville					
– 5. Staffel of Jagdgeschwader 3 – Action at the Channel and over England — 26 June 1940 – 8 June 1941
2	16 August 1940	13:20	Spitfire	Ashford	3	20 September 1940	12:20	Spitfire	south of London
– 5. Steffel of Jagdgeschwader 3 – Operation Barbarossa – 22 June – 1 November 1941
3? (Note: This claim is not listed by Mathews and Foreman.)	22 June 1941	07:45	I-153		16	26 July 1941	17:23	SB-3	
5	23 June 1941	04:50	I-16		17	26 July 1941	17:28	SB-3	
6	26 June 1941	08:10	DB-3		18	3 September 1941	07:00	I-26 (Yak-1)	
7	26 June 1941	08:30	DB-3		19	12 September 1941	10:00	I-26 (Yak-1)	
8	27 June 1941	08:05? (Note: According to Mathews and Foreman claimed at 08:10 over a Curtiss P-40 Warhawk.)	I-15?		20	12 September 1941	14:50	I-26 (Yak-1)	
9	30 June 1941	14:30	I-16		21	13 September 1941	06:55	V-11 (Il-2)	
10	2 July 1941	16:25	R-5		22	13 September 1941	06:57	V-11 (Il-2)	
11	2 July 1941	16:30	R-5		23	13 September 1941	07:03	R-5	
12	5 July 1941	13:10	SB-2		24	24 September 1941	08:30	I-153	
13	5 July 1941	16:20	DB-3		25	5 3 October 1941	09:55	Pe-2	
14	10 July 1941	17:20	one-engine aircraft	west of Kolontschina	26	17 October 1941	09:12	I-17 (MiG-1)	
15	10 July 1941	17:30	one-engine aircraft? (Note: According to Mathews and Foreman claimed over a Polikarpov I-16.)	west of Kolontschina	27	18 October 1941	14:50	I-61 (MiG-3)	
– 5. Steffel of Jagdgeschwader 3 "Udet" – Eastern Front – 26 April – October 1942
28	10 June 1942	13:10	Il-2		41	20 July 1942	11:58	MiG-1	PQ 08453
29	1 July 1942	13:11	Il-2		42	22 July 1942	16:15	LaGG-3	PQ 29362
30	4 July 1942	03:40	MiG-1	Ustia	43	26 July 1942	11:25	Yak-1	south of Kalach
31	4 July 1942	03:41	MiG-1	Malyschewo	44	26 July 1942	11:26	Yak-1	south of Kalach
32	4 July 1942	03:43	MiG-1	Malyschewo	45	26 July 1942	11:29	Yak-1	south of Kalach
33	9 July 1942	13:15	Yak-1		46	6 August 1942	06:50	LaGG-3	PQ 39682; 45 km (28 mi) east-southeast of Kletskaya
34	9 July 1942	13:16	Yak-1		47	7 August 1942	17:46	Pe-2	PQ 49556
35	10 July 1942	04:30	Boston	north of Voronezh	48	16 August 1942	04:30	LaGG-3	PQ 4034
36	10 July 1942	04:31	Boston	north of Voronezh	49	18 August 1942	06:45	I-16	PQ 30132
37	10 July 1942	04:33	Boston	north of Voronezh	50	18 August 1942	06:50	I-16	PQ 30251
38	10 July 1942	04:34	Boston	north of Voronezh	51	23 September 1942	07:25	LaGG-3	PQ 47331 northeast of Agaimon
39	13 July 1942	08:25	Yak-1		52	4 October 1942	13:50	LaGG-3	PQ 38574
40	13 July 1942	08:28	Yak-1		53	4 October 1942	13:55	LaGG-3	PQ 38721
– 1. Steffel of Jagdgeschwader 26 "Schlageter" – Eastern Front – February 1943
54	16 February 1943	14:53	Il-2	PQ 35 Ost 18423	56	18 February 1943	11:02	Il-2	PQ 35 Ost 28311
55	16 February 1943	15:25	Il-2	PQ 35 Ost 28142	57	18 February 1943	11:04	Il-2	PQ 35 Ost 28351
– 1. Staffel of Jagdgeschwader 26 "Schlageter" – On the Western Front — October – 31 December 1943
58	14 October 1943	13:40? (Note: According to Mathews and Foreman claimed at 13:50.)	B-17	PQ 05 Ost S/EN-7; Waldenrath					
– 1. Staffel of Jagdgeschwader 26 "Schlageter" – On the Western Front — 1–21 January 1944
59	11 January 1944	13:25	B-17	Nordhorn-Zuiderzee					
– 3. Staffel of Jagdgeschwader 26 "Schlageter" – On the Western Front — 22 January 1944 – 28 March 1945
60	4 February 1944	14:30	B-17	10 km (6.2 mi) east-southeast of Rotterdam	66	21 September 1944	17:17	DC-3	PQ 05 Ost JL/JM; Nijmegen
61	8 February 1944	12:45	P-51	PQ 05 Ost QJ-8/1 south of Maubeuge	67	21 September 1944	17:18	DC-3	PQ 05 Ost JL/JM; Nijmegen
62	6 March 1944	14:47	P-47	PQ 05 Ost GO-5/3; Almelo	68	21 September 1944	17:19	DC-3	's-Hertogenbosch west of Arnhem
63	15 August 1944	12:28	P-51	PQ 04 Ost N/BC-3southeast of Dreux	69	21 September 1944	17:20	DC-3	's-Hertogenbosch west of Arnhem
64	22 August 1944	12:35	Auster	PQ 04 Ost N/DU-8 northwest of Paris	70	23 September 1944	16:50	P-51	Goch
65	17 September 1944	17:51	Spitfire	PQ 05 Ost JN-7; Nijmegen	71	25 February 1945	08:25	P-47	southeast of Cologne

=== Awards ===
- Iron Cross (1939) 2nd and 1st Class
- Honor Goblet of the Luftwaffe (11 August 1941)
- German Cross in Gold on 9 April 1942 as Oberfeldwebel in the 5./Jagdgeschwader 3
- Knight's Cross of the Iron Cross on 19 September 1942 as Oberfeldwebel and pilot in the 4./Jagdgeschwader 3 "Udet" (Note: According to Scherzer as pilot in the 5./Jagdgeschwader 3 "Udet".)
