= Maxwell Nicholas Sparks =

Pilot of New Zealand Air Force

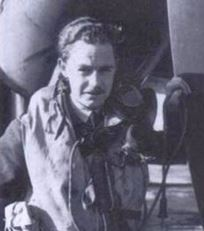
- A young Pilot Officer Maxwell Nicholas Sparks, standing with his hand on (probably) the propeller of his Mosquito FBVI, serial HX982 (coded EG-T)
- Born: 30 December 1920; Auckland, New Zealand
- Died: 13 June 2013 (aged 92); John Radcliffe Hospital, Oxford, UK
- Burial place: Kingsdown Crematorium, Swindon, UK
- Military career
- Allegiance: New Zealand
- Branch: Royal New Zealand Air Force and Royal Air Force
- Service years: 1941–~1965
- Rank: Flight Lieutenant
- Nickname: Maxie
- Unit: No. 487 Squadron RNZAF
- Conflicts: Operation Jericho
- Awards: Air Force Cross (United Kingdom)

Maxwell Nicholas Sparks AFC (30 December 1920 – 13 June 2013) was a former officer and pilot in the Royal New Zealand Air Force and Royal Air Force.

== Early life ==
Maxwell Nicholas Sparks was born in Auckland on 30 December 1920. He was an assistant chemist when he joined the Royal New Zealand Air Force in July 1941.

== Second World War ==
Sparks gained his pilot's wings later in the year and was subsequently posted to the United Kingdom to serve with the Royal Air Force. In September 1942 he joined the newly formed No. 487 Squadron, which was mostly composed of New Zealand flying personnel.

He piloted the DeHavilland Mosquito DH.98 reg. HX982 (EG-T) from RAF Hunsdon, Hertfordshire, with his navigator Pilot Officer Arthur Cecil Dunlop during the Operation Jericho raid on Amiens prison on 18 February 1944. The aircraft was damaged by flak and suffered a collapsed undercarriage on landing. The crew were uninjured.

He was released from the RNZAF in June 1945.

== Postwar career ==
In 1947 Sparks enlisted in the RAF. He served in Transport Command and was later posted to No. 233 Operational Conversion Unit as a staff officer. He served with No. 194 Squadron in British Malaya, and with Air Search Rescue squadrons. Sparks received the Air Force Cross in the 1961 New Year Honours. and the Queen's Commendation for Valuable Service in the Air in the 1965 Birthday Honours. He ended his service in the RAF in November 1967 as a flight lieutenant.

== Later life ==
In 2011, Maxwell Sparks was interviewed by the BBC's Martin Shaw at The Swan Inn at Swinbrook in Oxfordshire. He was asked about his role in the 'daring raid' on Amiens prison in 1944 (Operation Jericho). The interview is available to watch on the BBC website.

Flt Lt Sparks spent the final years of his life at his home in Carterton near RAF Brize Norton with his wife Pauline. They had a daughter, Nicola, who died some time before Maxwell's death in June 2013. His wife, Pauline, was still alive in 2015.
