= No. 140 Expeditionary Air Wing =

No. 140 Expeditionary Air Wing RAF Previous units: No. 140 Expeditionary Air Wing (Fighter) RAF No. 140 (Bomber) Wing RAF No. 140 Airfield Headquarters RAF
- Active: 1 April 2006 - 12 May 1944 - 14 November 1947
- Country: United Kingdom
- Branch: Royal Air Force
- Type: Expeditionary Air Wing
- Size: Wing
- Garrison/HQ: RAF Lossiemouth

Aircraft flown
- Bomber: Lockheed Ventura de Havilland Mosquito FB.VI
- Fighter: Eurofighter Typhoon FGR4

No. 140 Expeditionary Air Wing is a deployable Expeditionary Air Wing of the Royal Air Force based at RAF Lossiemouth, Moray, Scotland, UK.

The current wing was established on 1 April 2006 the wing has history dating back to May 1944:

== Second World War ==
No. 140 Airfield Headquarters RAF

The wing was originally No. 140 Airfield Headquarters RAF.

No. 140 (Bomber) Wing RAF

No. 140 Wing RAF was a formation of the Royal Air Force during the Second World War. It comprised No. 21 Squadron RAF, No. 464 Squadron RAAF and No. 487 Squadron RNZAF. It carried out many notable low-level bombing operations, including Operation Jericho (Amiens prison) and Operation Carthage in Copenhagen.

No. 464 and No. 487 Squadrons were Article XV Squadrons, i.e. they were Commonwealth squadrons which operated under the operational control of the Royal Air Force, which also was responsible e.g. for their pay.

== Deployments ==
- Deployed to Ämari Air Base, Estonia from April to September 2023 for Operation Azotize with Typhoon FGR4 of No. 9 Squadron
- Deployed to the 22nd Air Base, Poland between March and August 2025 for Operation Chessman with Typhoon FGR4 of No. II (AC) Squadron
