= Pathfinder (RAF) =

RAF target-marking squadrons in World War II

No. 8 (Pathfinder Force) Group
- Active: 15 August 1942 – 1945
- Country: United Kingdom
- Branch: Royal Air Force
- Size: Group
- Part of: RAF Bomber Command
- Group Headquarters: RAF Wyton
- Motto: "We guide to strike"

Commanders
- Notable commanders: Don Bennett

Insignia
- Group badge heraldry: A flaming arrow in front of an eight-pointed star

The Pathfinders were target-marking squadrons in RAF Bomber Command during World War II. They located and marked targets with flares, at which a main bomber force could aim, increasing the accuracy of their bombing. The Pathfinders were normally the first to receive new blind-bombing aids such as Gee, Oboe and the H2S radar.

The early Pathfinder Force (PFF) squadrons were expanded to become a group, No. 8 (Pathfinder Force) Group, in January 1943. The initial Pathfinder Force was five squadrons, whilst No 8 Group ultimately grew to a strength of 19 squadrons. Whereas the majority of Pathfinder squadrons and personnel were from the Royal Air Force, the group also included No 405 Squadron of the Royal Canadian Air Force as well as many individual airmen from the air forces of other Commonwealth countries.

== History ==
=== Background ===
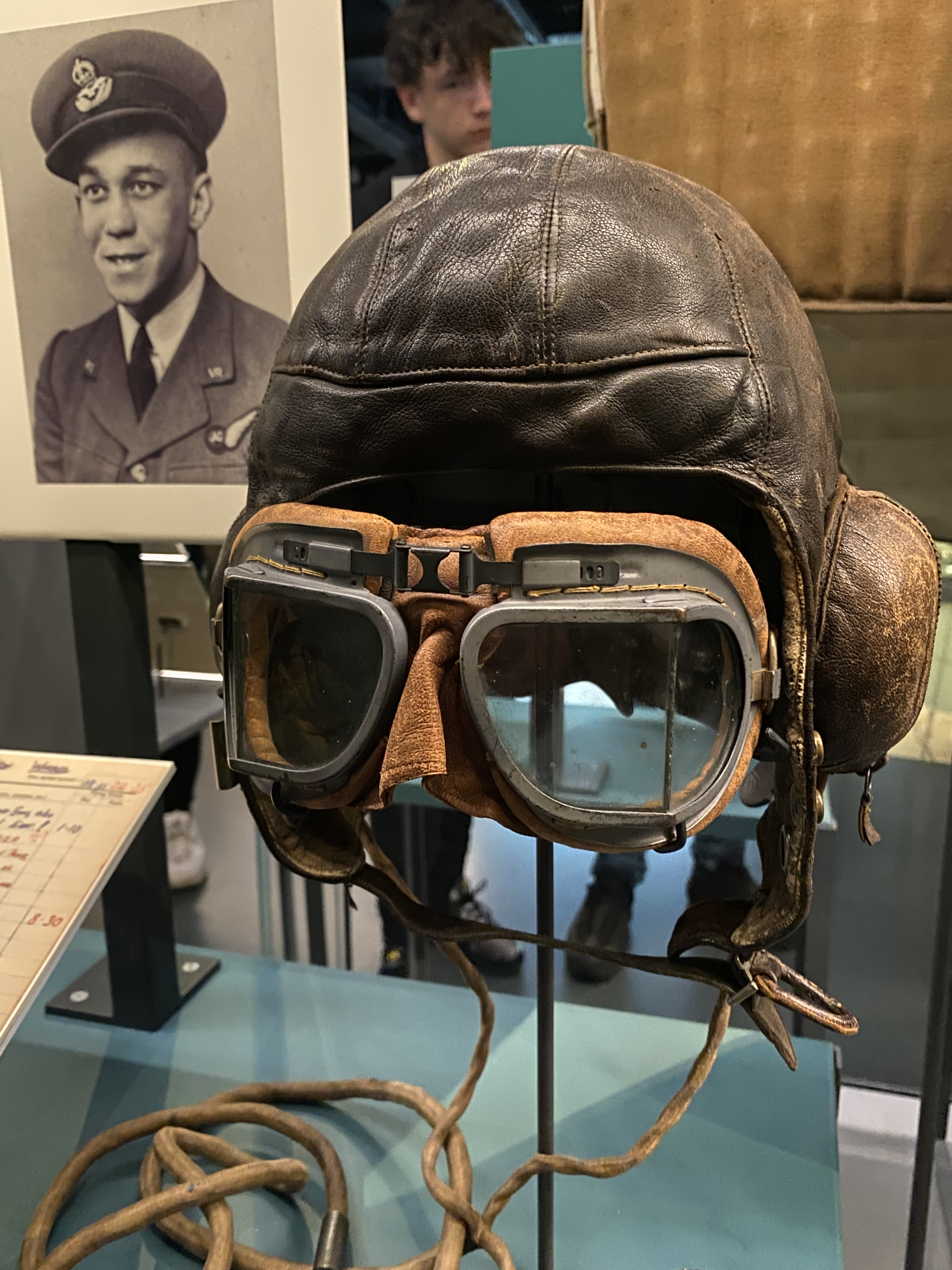
Imperial War Museum exhibit showcasing objects belonging to RAF pilot Billy Strachan, who served the pathfinders of the 156 Squadron

At the start of the Second World War in September 1939 the doctrine of RAF Bomber Command was based on tight formations of heavily armed bombers attacking during daylight and fending off attacks by fighters with their guns. In early missions over France and the Low Countries there was no clear outcome regarding the success of the bombers' guns: the Luftwaffe lacked widespread radar so their interception efforts were disorganised. On 18 December 1939 a raid by three squadrons of Vickers Wellington against ships in the Heligoland Bight was detected on an experimental Freya radar long before it reached the target area. The British bomber force was met by German fighters that shot down 10 of the 22 bombers, with another two crashing in the sea and three more written off on landing. The Luftwaffe lost only two fighters in return.

Although the causes for this disaster were debated it became clear that bomber forces could not defend themselves. Either bombing raids needed to have fighter escort, which was difficult given the limited range of the fighters, or attacks had to be made at night when the opponent's fighters could not see them. In the era before the widespread use of radar and the techniques needed to guide fighters to their targets with radar, night bombing would render the bombers vulnerable only if they were picked up by searchlights, a relatively rare occurrence. Offsetting the advantages of night bombing was the understanding that identifying the targets and attacking them accurately would be much more difficult. This meant a night bomber force was useful only against very large targets such as cities and was one of the reasons daylight bombing was considered.

The Germans had also studied this problem and had invested considerable effort in radio navigation techniques to address it, demonstrating a standard of bombing accuracy during the night raids that daylight forces found difficult. The RAF lacked similar navigation systems, having ignored their development for a number of years and relied almost entirely on dead reckoning and optical instruments such as the Course Setting Bomb Sight. In limited visibility or when the target did not have a clearly distinguishing landmark, accurate bombing was very difficult. Bomber Command pressed ahead with a night bombing campaign starting in 1940. Bomber crews reported good results, turning for home if they lost their way or could not find the target because of the weather and pressing on only if they felt confident they could identify the target with certainty. However it was not long before reports started reaching the UK from observers on the ground that the bombers were never even heard over the targets let alone dropping their bombs nearby. At first these reports were dismissed but as other branches of the UK armed forces complained a report was commissioned.

The result was the Butt Report of 18 August 1941, which noted that by the time the aircraft reached the Ruhr only one in 10 ever flew within 5 miles (8 km) of its target. Half of all the bombs carried into combat and dropped—many returned—fell in open country. Only one per cent of all the bombs were even in the vicinity of the target. Clearly something had to be done to address this or, as the other forces suggested, the strategic campaign should simply be dropped. Around this time Frederick Lindemann wrote an infamous report on dehousing, suggesting that the bomber force be directed against German urban areas, destroying as many houses as possible and thus rendering the German workforce unable to work well. Accepting the recommendations of Lindemann's report after intense debate, the British began planning a major offensive starting in the spring of 1942 with the aim of destroying German cities. By 1940 the British had started development of a number of night navigation aids and were already testing the Gee hyperbolic navigation system on operations. These would be available in quantity in early 1942, just as the heavy bombers, the Avro Lancaster and Handley Page Halifax, would be arriving in quantity. These technological developments dovetailed with the policy changes influenced by Lindemann's report.

=== Formation ===
Faced with the same navigation problems as the RAF, the Luftwaffe had developed radio aids that were widely used during their bombing campaign, the Blitz of 1940–1941. Lacking enough equipment to install in all their aircraft, an experimental group, Kampfgruppe 100 (KGr 100), was given all available receivers and trained extensively on their use. KGr 100 would fly over their target using these systems and drop flares, at which the following aircraft would then aim their bombs. On rare occasions KGr 100 was used as a pure bombing force, demonstrating the ability to drop bombs within 150 yards (140 m) of their targets in any weather. The KGr 100 unit itself would, in mid-December 1941, be renamed I.Gruppe/Kampfgeschwader 100, as the basis for a new Luftwaffe bomber wing or Kampfgeschwader (battle formation) that bore the same unit number.

The British, who had developed similar navigation aids, faced the same problem of quantity. Bomber Command expected to have only 300 Gee sets available by January 1942, all of them hand-built. Mass-produced models were not expected until May. As it turned out, both predictions proved optimistic. An obvious solution to Bomber Command's problems would be simply to copy the German technique of placing all available sets in a lead force. This was first proposed by Group Captain Sydney Bufton. Bomber Command's commander-in-chief Arthur "Bomber" Harris argued against the idea, with the backing of the majority of his Group commanders. His view was that an elite group would breed rivalry and envy and have an adverse effect on morale. Adding fuel to his argument was his dislike for Bufton. His idea for improving accuracy was to hold competitions within groups to deliver improved bombing. In rebuttal, Sir Henry Tizard, adviser and one of the chief scientists supporting the war effort, responded, "I do not think the formation of a first XV at rugby union makes little boys play any less enthusiastically."

Studying the German results, notably reports by R. V. Jones, the Air Ministry decided that the technique was sound and they overrode Harris' objections and forced the issue. Harris responded by suggesting the pathfinders be distributed among the squadrons but again his objections were overruled, since it would not produce the desired result of having the targets clearly marked in advance of the arrival of the main force. A specialist force was formed in August 1942 by transferring existing squadrons from the Bomber Command groups to make up the Path Finder Force (PFF).

The PFF began with five squadrons: one from each of the operational Bomber Command Groups, 1 Group contributed No. 156 Squadron RAF (equipped with the Wellington medium bomber), 2 Group No. 109 Squadron RAF—then "special duties"—(Wellingtons and Mosquitoes), 3 Group No. 7 Squadron RAF (Short Stirling heavy bombers), 4 Group No. 35 Squadron RAF (Halifax) and 5 Group No. 83 Squadron RAF (Lancaster). The PFF was commanded by Australian officer Air Vice-Marshal Don Bennett, who was to be the youngest officer promoted to RAF Air Vice Marshal, at the age of 33, in 1943. Bennett was not the Air Ministry's first choice: Harris opposed the first choice, Basil Embry, the leader of 2 Group. The squadrons were located on adjacent airfields within 3 Group at Oakington, Graveley, Wyton and Warboys with a headquarters at RAF Wyton; 3 Group was responsible for the Force administratively though it was under the direct command of Harris.

=== Early action ===
The PFF was first put into action on the night of 18/19 August 1942, when 118 Bomber Command aircraft attacked Flensburg. PFF bombers were the first 31 aircraft of the raid, including Stirlings, Halifaxes, Lancasters and Wellingtons – from 7, 35, 83 and 156 squadrons. Flensburg, on an inlet of the Baltic, was in theory an easy target for the PFF on their first operation but the winds shifted and the bomber force drifted north of the target to a part of Denmark where the coast also had many inlets. Sixteen PFF crews claimed to have marked the target area and 78 Main Force crews claimed to have bombed it. Reports from Flensburg stated that the town had not been hit but a Danish report showed that the towns of Sønderborg and Abenra and a large area of Denmark up to 25 miles (40 km) north of Flensburg were hit by scattered bombing. 26 houses were destroyed and 660 were damaged but only four Danish people were injured. The raid was a dismal failure, much to the delight of both Harris and other detractors of the strategic force as a whole.

The PFF's second mission was against Frankfurt on the night of 24/25 August. The group once again had great difficulty identifying its target in cloudy conditions and most of the bombs fell in open country north and west of the city. Local reports stated that some bombs fell in the city, causing 17 large and 53 small fires and moderate property damage. Five people were killed, including two anti-aircraft gunners, and 95 people were injured. The outlying villages of Schwalbach and Eschborn were heavily bombed. Six Lancasters, five Wellingtons, four Stirlings and one Halifax were lost, 7.1 per cent of the force. Five Pathfinder aircraft, including that of the commanding officer of 7 Squadron, were among the losses.

The PFF finally proved itself on the night of 27/28 August 1942 against Kassel. There was little cloud over the city and the Pathfinders were able to illuminate the area well. Widespread damage was caused, particularly in the south-western parts of the city. Kassel reported that 144 buildings were destroyed and 317 seriously damaged. Several military establishments were hit and 28 soldiers were killed, more than the civilian toll of 15, with 187 civilians and 64 soldiers injured. Among the buildings severely damaged were all three of the factories of the Henschel aircraft company. Of the 306 aircraft attacking the target, 31 were lost, 10.1 per cent of the force.

The next night the PFF operated against Nuremberg as part of a force of 159 aircraft. Crews were ordered to attack Nuremberg at low altitude and the PFF used new target illuminators adapted from 250-pound (110 kg) bomb casings. Photographs showed that these were placed with great accuracy and the crews of the Main Force claimed to have carried out a good attack. A report from Nuremberg stated that some bombs were dropped as far away as the town of Erlangen, nearly 10 miles (16 km) to the north, and four people were killed there. In Nuremberg, the number of bombs recorded would indicate that approximately 50 aircraft hit the town. 137 people were killed, 126 civilians and 11 foreigners. 23 bombers were shot down, 14.5 per cent of the force. Most of these were Wellingtons, which lost 34 per cent of their number.

On 1/2 September 1942 the PFF illuminated Saarbrücken as part of a 231-aircraft force, but post-raid analysis showed this to be Saarlouis, 13 miles (21 km) to the north and situated on a similar bend in the river. The next night a force of 200 bombers was led by accurate marking in Karlsruhe, and the raid was considered a great success, with an estimated 200 fires seen burning. Reconnaissance photographs showed much residential and some industrial damage. A very short report from Karlsruhe says only that 73 people were killed and that three public buildings in the city centre were hit.

=== Improved technique ===
As the PFF gained experience new problems appeared. Many bombers in the Main Force lost their way to the target and either bombed randomly or turned for home. Another problem was that the illuminators would go out before the raid was complete, leaving the following aircraft to bomb on visible fires, if there were any. This led to the problem of "creepback", when the newly arriving bombers would drop their bombs on the near side of the fire so they could turn for home earlier. This led to subsequent bombs slowly walking backward along the attack vector, away from the target.

To address these problems the PFF adopted new techniques. Their force was split into three groups for each raid. The 'illuminators' would drop white target illuminators at points along the attack vector, allowing aircraft to follow these markers over long distances and thus avoid getting lost en route. The 'visual markers' would drop coloured target indicators on the target, but only if they were sure it had been identified. Finally the 'backers-up' or 'fire starters' used the visual markers' flares as the aim point for their own incendiary bombs to light fires in the proper location, which would burn longer than the flares.

The new technique was first employed on 4/5 September 1942 on a raid of 251 aircraft against Bremen. The weather was clear and the PFF marked the target correctly, with the majority of the following Main Force finding the target and bombing it. The post-raid analysis showed that 460 houses had been destroyed, 1,361 seriously damaged and 7,592 lightly damaged. Added to this list were hundreds of light and medium industrial buildings, including the Weser aircraft works and the Atlas shipyard and associated warehouses. The raid was a complete success.

Another improvement was the introduction of larger bomb casings for the target indicators, starting with the 'Pink Pansy' in an adapted 4,000-pound (1,800 kg) casing. Using these for the first time on the night of 10/11 September 479 aircraft attacked Düsseldorf and caused enormous damage. In addition to thousands of houses destroyed or heavily damaged, 39 industrial firms in Düsseldorf and 13 in Neuss were damaged so much that all production ceased, and 19,427 people were bombed out.

=== German counterefforts ===
The Germans were well aware of the RAF's target marking and quickly deduced the basic strategy was a copy of their own from 1940/41. German intelligence reports from later in the war show a wealth of information on the PFF. On the night of 15/16 October 1942 on a raid by 289 aircraft against Cologne, the Germans lit a decoy target indicator that deceived the majority of the Main Force's bombs. Only one 4,000-pound (1,800 kg), three smaller General Purpose and 210 incendiary bombs hit the city out of a force of almost 70,000 bombs in total.

Follow-up efforts during October and November were mostly small raids, including a number against cities in Italy. Weather and operational problems meant that raids during this period were limited and of greatly varied results.

=== New systems, increasing tempo ===
On 20/21 December 1942 Harry Emlyn Bufton personally led a force of six de Havilland Mosquitos on a raid against a power station at Lutterade, a small town in the Netherlands. Led entirely by the new Oboe navigation system, several bombs fell within 2 kilometres (1.2 mi) of the target. The test was considered a success. A follow-up under more realistic conditions was carried out on the night of 31 December 1942/1 January 1943 against Düsseldorf, with two Mosquitos leading a force of eight Lancasters. Only one of the Oboes worked but that was enough for the following heavies to bomb on and hit a number of industrial buildings. Another mission by three Mosquitos attacked the German night-fighter control room at Florennes airfield in Belgium, but there was complete cloud cover and the results were not known. It was clear by this point, after less than six months, that the PFF concept was a great advance.

Picked crews from the bomber groups were allowed to transfer and the PFF soon expanded into a completely new Group—designated No 8 Group (PFF)—in January 1943. In April 1943 the group's strength was increased by two squadrons, with No 405 (RCAF) Squadron, flying Halifaxes, and No 97 Squadron, flying Lancasters. In June the Pathfinders gained two more squadrons—No 105 and 139 Squadrons—both of which were flying Mosquitos from RAF Marham. Later in the month Pathfinder HQ moved from RAF Wyton to Castle Hill House in Huntingdon. When new aircraft such as the de Havilland Mosquito became available, the PFF got the first examples and then equipped them with ever more sophisticated electronic equipment, such as Oboe, the radio navigation and bombing aid.

By January the pace of Bomber Command missions had dramatically increased, with major raids being carried out almost every night. On 11/12 February 1943 against Wilhelmshaven, the PFF used their H2S radar for the first time, dropping parachute flares above the heavy cloud cover in a technique known as 'sky marking'. The follow-up force observed an incredible event, a huge explosion seen through the complete cloud cover that lingered for 10 minutes. It was later learned this was the explosion of the naval ammunition depot at Mariensiel, which destroyed 120 acres (49 hectares). Mission size continued to grow throughout, and although many missions continued to mark the wrong targets or fail for other reasons the damage caused continued to increase. On one particularly successful raid against Essen on 5/6 March 1943 160 acres (65 ha) of land were destroyed, with 53 separate buildings within the Krupp factories hit by bombs.

=== Master bomber ===
On the night of 20/21 June 1943 another change in technique was tested by 60 Lancasters (mostly from 5 Group) against Zeppelin works at Friedrichshafen, which were believed to be making radar. In this raid one of the Lancasters was equipped with new high-frequency radio equipment that allowed it to communicate with the other bombers in the attack force. (Note: In the operation against the German dams of May 1943, Guy Gibson had directed the individual bombing runs against the Möhne then Eder dams.) The follow-up force consisted of several groups, including PFF aircraft, who marked the target based on radio instructions from what would become known as 'the Master Bomber'. Another group of aircraft were to attempt a new technique, bombing at a specific time after passing a ground feature, in this case the shores of Lake Constance. Nearly 10 per cent of the bombs hit the factory in what was considered a great success.

A combination of these techniques was first used on a large raid to great success on the night of 17/18 August 1943 in Operation Hydra against German rocket research at Peenemünde. A master bomber led 596 aircraft to a series of target indicators dropped at several locations around the target area. By dropping different-coloured indicators and calling aircraft to attack each one in turn, the entire area was heavily bombed. The aircraft from No 5 Group used their time-from-landmark technique again. The estimate has appeared in many sources that this raid set back the V-2 experimental programme by at least two months and reduced the scale of the eventual rocket attack. The V-2 team had to move their testing facilities hastily elsewhere. The Master Bomber became a common feature of large raids.

The United States Army Air Forces operated a similar force within the Eighth Air Force for 'blind-bombing' through overcast on daylight missions using H2X radar-equipped bombers, for which it also used the terms Pathfinder, PFF and master bomber.

=== Rivalry in Bomber Command ===
Although the AOCs of the Groups had been mixed in their enthusiasm for the Pathfinder Force, they generally supported it. AVM Roderic Carr (4 Group) was opposed to its creation but had identified Bennett (10 Squadron was in his group) as the sort of person suitable for the job and passed over a squadron of Halifax heavy bombers. AVM Coryton had been a greater opponent but supplied a squadron of the new Avro Lancasters. There was rivalry between 8 Group and 5 Group, driven by the rivalry between Bennett and the commander of 5 Group, Sir Ralph Cochrane. Through the CO of 617 Squadron Leonard Cheshire, Cochrane was an advocate of precision low-level marking and lobbied to be allowed to prove the theory and for 5 Group to attempt targets and techniques that 8 Group would not.

Cheshire marked targets using the fast Mosquito bomber, then later a Mustang fighter bomber. 617 Squadron achieved high levels of accuracy using the Stabilizing Automatic Bomb Sight; with the necessary accuracy of only 94 yards (86 m) at the V weapon launch site at Abbeville. 5 Group also invented various techniques, such as the "5 Group corkscrew" to evade enemy fighters, and the "quick landing system".

=== Light Night Striking Force ===
The Light Night Striking Force (LNSF) was a development of the Pathfinder Force's use of the fast and long-ranged Mosquito bomber, which could carry a sizeable bomb load. Under 8 Group, the number of Mosquito squadrons was built up and used for harassing raids on Germany. To the two (Oboe-equipped) Mosquito squadrons already in the Pathfinder Force, 139 Squadron was added in June 1943, which Bennett intended to use for diversionary raids to draw the German night fighters away from the main force. In February 1944 a raid made entirely by Mosquitos was mounted against Düsseldorf. It was formed of the usual marker aircraft from 105 Squadron and 692 Squadron Mosquitos, each carrying a 4,000-pound (1,800 kg) "cookie" and backup aircraft with 500-pound (230 kg) delayed action bombs. (Note: The Mosquito was able to carry these bombs all the way to Berlin, and regularly did.) With Harris' support, Bennett formed more Mosquito squadrons to expand the LNSF, giving him nine bomber squadrons, as well as the Oboe-equipped markers and 8 Group's meteorological Mosquitos. The LNSF achieved 27,239 sorties, their best month being March 1945 with nearly 3,000 sorties. The LNSF suffered the loss of just under 200 aircraft on operations or "damaged beyond repair". The Pathfinder Force flew a total of 50,490 sorties against some 3,440 targets and at least 3,727 members were killed on operations.

== Tactics ==
The proportion of Pathfinder aircraft to Main Force bombers could vary according to the difficulty and location of the target; 1 to 15 was common, though it could be as low as 1 to 3. By the start of 1944, the bulk of Bomber Command was bombing within 3 miles (4.8 km) of the PFF indicators, an appreciable improvement in accuracy since 1942. The success or failure of a raid now largely depended on the Pathfinders' marker placement and the success of further correction marking.

=== Individual tasks ===
PFF crews found themselves given ever increasingly sophisticated and complex jobs that were constantly modified and developed tactically during the bombing campaign from 1943 until the end of the war. Some of the more usual tasks were as:

"Finders"; these were 8 Group aircraft tasked with dropping sticks of illuminating flares, firstly at critical points along the bombing route to aid navigation and keep the bomber stream compact and then across the approximate target area. If conditions were cloudy then these were dropped "blind" using H2S navigational radar.

"Illuminators"; were PFF aircraft flying in front of the main force who would drop markers or target indicators (TIs) onto the designated 'aiming point' already illuminated by the "Finders". Again, if conditions were cloudy H2S navigational radar was used. These TIs were designed to burn with various and varying colours to prevent the German defenses lighting decoy fires. Various TI's were dubbed "Pink Pansies", "Red Spots", and "Smoke Puffs". "Illuminators" could include Mosquitoes equipped with "Oboe" if the target was within the range of this bombing aid.

"Markers"; would then drop incendiaries onto the TIs just prior to the Main Force arrival. Further "Markers" called "Backers-Up" or "Supporters" would be distributed at points within the main bomber stream to remark or reinforce the original TIs as required.

As the war wore on, the role of "Master Bomber" was introduced. This was an idea that had been used by Guy Gibson in the Dam Busters raid. Bennett wanted to lead raids but was denied operational flying as Harris was not prepared to risk losing him. The appointed Pathfinder (usually an experienced senior officer) circled the target, broadcasting radio instructions to both Pathfinders and Main Force aircraft, correcting aiming points and generally co-ordinating the attack. In September 1944, Gibson himself died in a Mosquito after performing as "master bomber" for a raid on Germany.

=== Types of marking ===
Three types of target marking were developed by the Pathfinders. These were known by the codenames Parramatta, Wanganui and Newhaven – the names coming from locations in Australia, New Zealand and the UK which had links with Pathfinder staff. If the Oboe system was used to determine the release point then the word "Musical" was used as a prefix, e.g. "Musical Parramatta".

Parramatta
Parramatta used navigation aids such as H2S radar or Oboe radio signals to drop the markers.

Newhaven
Newhaven used illumination flares dropped above the target area to light it up sufficiently for a visual marking by the Pathfinder aircraft.

Wanganui
Wanganui was used when the target was obscured by cloud, industrial haze, or a smoke screen. Oboe or H2S was used to release the markers over the unseen target. The target indicators used were on parachutes to give an aiming point that could be seen by the main force. This was also known as "sky marking".

In all cases, further target Indicators would be dropped in the course of the raid to reinforce the marking and to compensate for earlier TIs either burning out or being extinguished by the bombing.

=== Equipment ===
For marking the Pathfinders used a number of special "Target Indicator" (TI) markers and bombs. These ejected coloured flares or illuminated the target.

- Candle Aircraft, TI, Bomb, Type H

the candle was the basic indicator. About 2 feet (0.61 m) long and about 2 inches (51 mm) in diameter, it sequentially ejected flare pellets that burned for 15 seconds each. The type H was filled with alternately coloured pellets (red/yellow or red/green or yellow/green), and illuminated for about 5 1/2 minutes in total

Candles and other pyrotechnics were used as the fillings for the various Target Indicator bombs.

- No. 1 Mk 1 TI Bomb
- No. 7 Mk 1 Multi-flash Bomb
- No. 8 Mk 1 Spotfire Bomb

== Squadrons and stations ==
Between 1942 and 1945

- No. 7 Squadron RAF – Stirling, then Lancaster
- No. 35 Squadron RAF – Halifax, then Lancaster
- No. 83 Squadron RAF – Lancaster
- No. 97 Squadron RAF – Lancaster
- No. 105 Squadron RAF – Mosquito
- No. 109 Squadron RAF – Wellington, then Mosquito – Oboe
- No. 128 Squadron RAF – Mosquito formed 1944
- No. 139 Squadron RAF – Mosquito
- No. 142 Squadron RAF – Mosquito formed 1944
- No. 156 Squadron RAF – Wellington, then Lancaster
- No. 162 Squadron RAF – Mosquito formed 1944
- No. 163 Squadron RAF – Mosquito formed 1945
- No. 405 Squadron RCAF – Halifax, then Lancaster
- No. 571 Squadron RAF – Mosquito formed 1944
- No. 582 Squadron RAF – Lancaster formed 1944
- No. 608 Squadron RAF – Mosquito formed 1944
- No. 627 Squadron RAF – Mosquito formed 1943
- No. 635 Squadron RAF – Lancaster formed 1944
- No. 692 Squadron RAF – Mosquito formed 1944

83, 97 and 627 Squadrons passed to 5 Group in April 1944

Stations

- RAF Bourn
- RAF Downham Market
- RAF Graveley
- RAF Gransden Lodge
- RAF Little Staughton
- RAF Marham
- RAF Oakington
- RAF Upwood
- RAF Warboys
- RAF Wyton

== See also ==
- List of Royal Air Force groups
- RAF Bomber Command Aircrew of World War II
- Pathfinder March, an annual 46-mile (74-kilometre) long-distance walk around the County of Cambridgeshire, England, to perpetuate the memory of No. 8 (Pathfinder Force) Group
- Pathfinders, a British series of 13 episodes concerning the fictitious 192 Pathfinder squadron in the Second World War
