= Ian Bazalgette =

Recipient of the Victoria Cross

- Born: 19 October 1918; Calgary, Alberta, Canada
- Died: 4 August 1944 (aged 25); Senantes, France
- Burial place: Église Saint-Martin, Senantes
- Military career
- Allegiance: United Kingdom
- Branch: British Army (1940–1941); Royal Air Force (1941–1944)
- Service years: 1940–1944
- Rank: Squadron Leader
- Units: No. 115 Squadron RAF; No. 635 Squadron RAF
- Conflicts: Second World War: European air campaign †; Battle of the Ruhr; Battle of Berlin
- Awards: Victoria Cross; Distinguished Flying Cross

Squadron Leader Ian Willoughby Bazalgette VC DFC (19 October 1918 – 4 August 1944) was a Canadian-British pilot in the Royal Air Force during the Second World War. On 4 August 1944, while piloting an Avro Lancaster in a pathfinder role, Bazalgette and crew flew to Trossy St. Maximin in France to mark a V-1 flying bomb storage cave. Bazalgette's Lancaster was severely damaged by flak prior to arrival at the target and quickly set on fire. Despite the condition of his aircraft, Bazalgette continued to the target and accurately dropped his markers. After completing the task, Bazalgette ordered his crew to bail out, however, two members of the crew were wounded and unable to jump. Rather than saving himself and leaving the two men to die, Bazalgette attempted to land the burning plane to save his two crew members. Bazalgette landed the plane, but it exploded almost immediately upon alighting, killing all three airmen. For his actions, Bazalgette was posthumously awarded the Victoria Cross.

== Early years ==
Ian Willoughby Bazalgette was born in Calgary, Alberta, Canada on 19 October 1918 to parents of English and Irish background, Charles Ian Bazalgette (1888–1956) and Marion Edith, née Bunn (1891–1977). His great-grandfather was the civil engineer Sir Joseph Bazalgette. Bazalgette was always known as "Will" in his family, to distinguish him from his father, who was known as "Ian". Bazalgette began his schooling at the Toronto Balmy Beach School, but his family returned to England in 1927. He grew up in New Malden, England and attended Rokeby School in Wimbledon (1927–1932) and then Beverley Boys Secondary School as well as receiving private tutelage. In his childhood he suffered from poor health, and at 13 was diagnosed with clinical tuberculosis, which required four months of treatment at the Royal Sea-Bathing Hospital, Margate, in 1931.

== Second World War ==
When the Second World War broke out, Bazalgette enlisted in the Royal Artillery, being commissioned as a second lieutenant in 1940. After serving in the Searchlight Section as an instructor, he transferred to the Royal Air Force Volunteer Reserve. He soloed within a week of beginning his flight training at RAF Cranwell and swiftly completed his ab initio flying by 24 January 1942, given the rank of pilot officer. His first posting was to No. 25 Operational Training Unit (OTU) but by 16 September 1942, he had joined an operational bomber squadron, No. 115 Squadron RAF at RAF Mildenhall, Suffolk. Flying the venerable Vickers Wellington bomber, "Baz" was sent out initially on "gardening" sorties, laying mines in the North Sea. After 13 operations, Bazalgette and his squadron transitioned to the Avro Lancaster, completing their training in March 1943.

After completing 10 more operations successfully on raids against heavily defended targets, including Berlin, Essen, Kiel and St. Nazaire, and surviving some harrowing escapes including a crash landing, Bazalgette was awarded the Distinguished Flying Cross (DFC) on 29 May 1943. The award noted his "great courage and determination in the face of the enemy".

With the end of his tour of 28 operations, Bazalgette was posted as an instructor and Flight Commander to No. 20 OTU in Lossiemouth, Scotland, before he was "recruited" for the Pathfinders. He transferred in April 1944 to No. 635 Squadron RAF, part of No. 8 (Pathfinder Force) Group, based at RAF Downham Market in Norfolk.

When his conversion training was completed, 25-year-old "Baz" flew as an acting squadron leader, taking part in a number of operations during and after the D-Day campaign. As the assigned Master Bomber, Bazalgette's 58th and final operation was the bombing of V-1 rocket storage caves at Trossy St. Maximin.

== Final operation ==
On 4 August 1944 at Trossy St. Maximin, France, Squadron Leader Bazalgette's Lancaster III ND811 of No. 635 Squadron RAF was among a formation tasked to mark German positions for the main bomber force. When near the target, his bomber came under severe anti-aircraft fire from the ground, putting both starboard engines out of action and causing a serious fire. As the deputy 'master bomber' had already been shot down, the success of the attack depended on Squadron Leader Bazalgette, and despite the damage to his aircraft, he pressed on to the target, marking and bombing it accurately. After the bombs had been dropped the Lancaster dived, practically out of control. Bazalgette regained control, but the port inner engine failed and the starboard mainplane was on fire.

Bazalgette ordered the members of his crew who were able to (F/L Charles Godfrey DFC, Sgt George Turner, F/O Douglas Cameron DFM, and F/L Geoffrey Goddard) to bail out. He then attempted to bring the burning aircraft to safety by attempting to land the crippled plane near Senantes (Oise). But it exploded, killing him and the remaining two wounded crew members, F/L Ivan Hibbert DFC and F/S Vernon Leeder. A memorial to Bazalgette, Hibbert, and Leeder can be seen along the road beside the farm where he landed the plane. 49.495556°N 1.834167°E.

Coincidentally, Flying Officer Cameron had also been a member of Flight Sergeant Ron Middleton's crew when the Australian was awarded a posthumous Victoria Cross.

Bazalgette's grave is at Senantes Churchyard, 13 miles northwest of Beauvais, France. His Victoria Cross is displayed at the Royal Air Force Museum in Hendon, England.

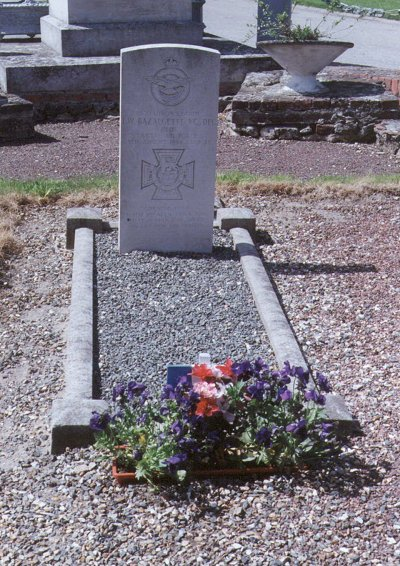
Gravesite

Bazalgette Gardens in New Malden, Surrey, where he had attended Beverley Boys School, was named in his honour during the early 1950s. A school in Calgary, Ian Bazalgette Junior High School, is also named after him.

== Bazalgette Memorial Lancaster ==
At the Nanton Lancaster Society Air Museum, now the Bomber Command Museum of Canada (located in Nanton, Alberta, south of his hometown Calgary), an Avro Lancaster, FM159, after a lengthy period of reconstruction and repair, was painted in the colours and markings of Bazalgette's aircraft. A dedication ceremony was held in 1990. Group Captain T.G. 'Hamish' Mahaddie, who had honored Bazalgette's request to be transferred into the Pathfinders, came from England to speak at the ceremony. Ethel Broderick, Bazalgette's sister, unveiled a plaque and the markings of the Bazalgette aircraft (F2-T) were unveiled by two of Bazalgette's crew members, Chuck Godfrey and George Turner.
