= No. 8 Group RAF =

Royal Air Force group during WWII

No. 8 (PFF) Group RAF No. 8 (Bomber) Group RAF No. 8 (Training) Group RAF
- Royal Air Force Ensign
- Active: 1 April 1918 - 15 May 1919; 1 September 1941 - 28 January 1942; 13 January 1943 – 15 December 1945
- Country: United Kingdom
- Branch: Royal Air Force
- Type: Royal Air Force group
- Role: Pathfinder Force
- Part of: RAF Bomber Command
- Group Headquarters: Brampton Grange (September 1941 - January 1942); RAF Wyton (January 1943 - May 1943); Castle Hill House, Huntingdon (May 1943 - December 1945)
- Motto: We Guide to strike

Commanders
- Notable commanders: Air Vice Marshal Don Bennett CB, CBE, DSO

Insignia
- Group badge: A Mullet of eight points surmounted by an arrow enflamed, point downwards, in bend sinister (Note: The star and eight points represent the number 8 group and the astro-navigation undertaken by its crews. The flaming arrow was meant to demonstrate their Pathfinding role)

No. 8 Group RAF (8 Gp) was a Royal Air Force group which existed during the final year of the First World War and during the Second World War.

== First World War ==
No. 8 Group was formed in April 1918 as a training unit and designated 8 Group (Training). It remained in this function throughout the rest of the war and was disbanded in May 1919.

== Second World War ==
=== First formation ===
The Group was re-established as No 8 (Bomber) Group on 1 September 1941 only to be disbanded around five months later on 28 January 1942.

=== Reformation of Group 8 ===
8 Group was re-constituted when Bomber Command's Pathfinder Force was renamed No. 8 (Pathfinder Force) Group on 8 January 1943. The group consisted of specialist squadrons that marked targets for the main attacks of Bomber Command aircraft. The Force, which had been formed in August 1942 with five squadrons from the existing Bomber Command Groups, flew a mix of Short Stirling, Handley Page Halifax, and Avro Lancaster, all four-engined heavy bomber aircraft, along with Vickers Wellington, a twin-engined, long-range medium bomber aircraft. When new aircraft, such as the de Havilland Mosquito, a twin-engined, multirole combat aircraft became available, 8 Group got the first ones. Its aircraft used navigation aids such as Gee, H2S and Oboe to find the targets of attack more accurately than the main force on its own could. Initially formed of five squadrons, 8 Group ultimately grew to a strength of 19 squadrons.

No. 8 Group was also responsible for the Light Night Striking Force, equipped with Mosquito bombers and used for harassing raids on Germany. It was disbanded on 15 December 1945, though its badge and motto ("We Guide to Strike") were subsequently authorized on 11 March 1953. While the majority of Pathfinder squadrons and personnel were from the Royal Air Force, the group also included many from the air forces of other Commonwealth countries. The PFF flew a total of 50,490 individual sorties against some 3,440 targets. The cost in human lives was grievous. At least 3,727 members were killed on operations and 675 aircraft lost.

== Structure ==
February 1943

- No. 7 Squadron RAF at RAF Oakington with the Short Stirling I
- No. 35 Squadron RAF at RAF Graveley with the Handley Page Halifax II
- No. 83 Squadron RAF at RAF Wyton with the Avro Lancaster I, III
- No. 109 Squadron RAF at RAF Wyton with the de Havilland Mosquito IV
- No. 156 Squadron RAF at RAF Warboys with the Vickers Wellington III & Avro Lancaster I, III

February 1944

- No. 7 Squadron RAF at RAF Oakington with the Avro Lancaster I, III
- No. 35 Squadron RAF at RAF Graveley with the Handley Page Halifax III
- No. 83 Squadron RAF at RAF Wyton with the Avro Lancaster I, III
- No. 105 Squadron RAF at RAF Marham with the de Havilland Mosquito IV, IX
- No. 109 Squadron RAF at RAF Marham with the de Havilland Mosquito IV, IX
- No. 139 Squadron RAF at RAF Upwood with the de Havilland Mosquito IV, IX, XVI, XX
- No. 156 Squadron RAF at RAF Warboys with the Avro Lancaster I, III
- No. 405 Squadron RCAF at RAF Gransden Lodge with the Avro Lancaster I, III
- No. 627 Squadron RAF at RAF Oakington with the de Havilland Mosquito IV
- No. 692 Squadron RAF at RAF Graveley with the de Havilland Mosquito IV

22 March 1945

- No. 7 Squadron RAF at RAF Oakington with the Avro Lancaster I, III
- No. 35 Squadron RAF at RAF Graveley with the Avro Lancaster I, III
- No. 105 Squadron RAF at RAF Bourn with the de Havilland Mosquito IX, XVI
- No. 109 Squadron RAF at RAF Little Staughton with the de Havilland Mosquito IX, XVI
- No. 128 Squadron RAF at RAF Wyton with the de Havilland Mosquito XVI
- No. 139 Squadron RAF at RAF Upwood with the de Havilland Mosquito IX, XVI, XX, XXV
- No. 142 Squadron RAF at RAF Gransden Lodge with the de Havilland Mosquito XXV
- No. 156 Squadron RAF at RAF Upwood with the Avro Lancaster I, III
- No. 162 Squadron RAF at RAF Bourn with the de Havilland Mosquito XX, XXV
- No. 163 Squadron RAF at RAF Wyton with the de Havilland Mosquito XXV
- No. 405 Squadron RCAF at RAF Gransden Lodge with the Avro Lancaster I, III
- No. 571 Squadron RAF at RAF Oakington with the de Havilland Mosquito XVI
- No. 582 Squadron RAF at RAF Little Staughton with the Avro Lancaster I, III
- No. 608 Squadron RAF at RAF Downham Market with the de Havilland Mosquito XX, XXV
- No. 635 Squadron RAF at RAF Downham Market with the Avro Lancaster I, III
- No. 692 Squadron RAF at RAF Graveley with the de Havilland Mosquito XVI

== Headquarters ==
- August 1942 - RAF Wyton
- June 1943 - Castle Hill House, Huntingdon

== Air Officer Commanding ==
=== 1918 to 1919 ===
- 1918 Brigadier-General John Miles Steel

=== 1941 to 1942 ===
- 8 September 1941 Air Commodore Francis Fogarty
- December 1941 Air Vice-Marshal Donald Stevenson (appointment not certain)

=== 1943 to 1945 ===
- 13 January 1943 Air Vice-Marshal Don Bennett
- 21 May 1945 Air Vice-Marshal John Whitley

== See also ==
- List of Royal Air Force groups

== Bibliography ==
- Bennett, D. C. T. (1988). Pathfinder: A War Autobiography (pbk. ed.). Wilmslow: Goodall. ISBN 978-0-907579-57-1.
- Falconer, J (2012). RAF Airfields of World War 2. UK: Ian Allan Publishing. ISBN 978-1-85780-349-5.
- Moyes, P. J. R. (1976). Bomber Squadrons of the RAF and their Aircraft. London: Macdonald and Jane's. ISBN 978-0-354-01027-6.
