= Bawdeswell =

Small rural village and civil parish in Norfolk, England

Coordinates: 52.7466°N 1.0298°E

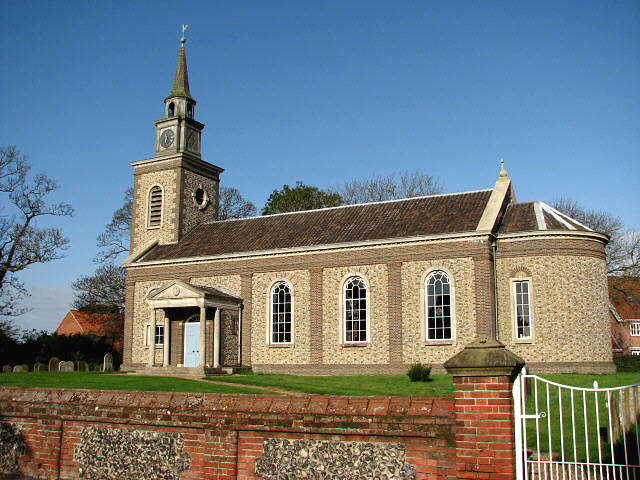
- All Saints' Church, Bawdeswell

- Location within Norfolk
- Area: 4.87 km^{2} (1.88 sq mi)
- Population: 828 (2011 census.)
  - Density: 170/km^{2} (440/sq mi)
- OS grid reference: TG046208
- District: Breckland
- Shire county: Norfolk
- Region: East
- Country: England
- Sovereign state: United Kingdom
- Post town: DEREHAM
- Postcode district: NR20
- Dialling code: 01362
- Police: Norfolk
- Fire: Norfolk
- Ambulance: East of England
- UK Parliament: Mid Norfolk

Bawdeswell (/ˈbɔdzwəl/) is a small rural village and civil parish in Norfolk, England. At the time of the 2011 census it had a population of 828 and an area of 487 hectares. The village is situated almost in the centre of Norfolk about 14 miles (23 km) northwest of Norwich. For the purposes of local government it falls within the Upper Wensum Ward of Breckland District Council and the Elmham and Mattishall Division of Norfolk County Council. It is on a Roman road that ran east–west between Durobrivae near modern Peterborough and Smallburgh, crossing the Fen Causeway.

The village is recorded in the Domesday Book of 1086 as Balderwella. It was the home of Chaucer's Reeve in The Reeve's Prologue and Tale in the Canterbury Tales.

Its parish church, All Saints, was rebuilt after its Victorian church was destroyed in World War II when hit by a crashing de Havilland Mosquito bomber.

== Toponymy ==
The village name has been spelled as Baldereswella, Baldeswell, Badswell, Bawsewella and Baldeswelle – in 1807 it was officially Baldeswell. The exact meaning of the name of the village is uncertain. However, wella is a well, "stream" or "spring", and it is clear that there has always been water here with quite a number of wells still surviving, the water table being 12 feet (3.7 m) or less. Baldhere is an Anglo-Saxon man's name, composed of Old English elements meaning "bold, strong" and "army", and may date back before the 7th century. In Norse it was a mythological son of the God Odin and in Swedish meant "The God of Light". The name of the village may thus stem from the Old English given name Baldhere and refers to a source of water belonging to or possibly discovered by him. Therefore, an original spelling may have been Baldhereswella. In his An Essay towards a Topographical History of the County of Norfolk: volume 8, historian, social and landscape geographer Francis Blomefield considers the meaning of balder could be quick running water and ascribes the same meaning to Boldre, Hampshire and Baldersdale, North Yorkshire.

== Geography ==
Bawdeswell Village is situated almost in the centre of Norfolk on the northeastern boundary of Breckland District. It is about 14 miles (23 km) northwest of Norwich, 10 miles (16 km) southeast of Fakenham, 7 miles (11 km) northeast of the market town of Dereham and 3 miles (4.8 km) west of the small market town of Reepham which is in Broadland District. The main area of the village is situated immediately to the north of the A1067 road but there are also a few dwellings to the south of the A1067 on Dereham Road, Billingford Road and Elsing Lane. There is also a small amount of development on Reepham Road to the North of the village. The main area of the village varies between 140 and 150 feet (46 m) above sea level.

Bawdeswell is close to the village of Foxley and to Foxley Wood which is a Site of Special Scientific Interest (SSSI) and the largest remaining area of ancient woodland in Norfolk, England.

Bawdeswell Parish is adjacent to the Parishes of Foxley to the North, Bylaugh and Sparham to the south, Billingford to the west and Reepham to the east.

Six roads meet at the settlement. From the northwest the road from Fakenham and from the southeast the road from Norwich (A1067). From the west the road from King's Lynn via Litcham and North Elmham and from the east the road from Mundesley on the coast via Aylsham and Reepham (B1145). From the southwest the road from Dereham via Swanton Morely. Lastly the road south to Elsing that starts as Elsing Lane and after reaching Elsing meanders through various lanes to places south such as North Tuddenham and Mattishall.

== History ==
Bawdeswell is sited on a Roman road that ran from Durobrivae near modern Peterborough, across the Fen Causeway to Denver, followed Fincham Drove and crossed Peddars Way between Castle Acre and Swaffham, thence towards North Elmham and Billingford, to Bawdeswell and Jordans Green, and on to Smallburgh. It was a major east–west route and possibly continued via the large Roman settlement at Brampton to Caister or an important port since eroded by the sea. The village lies just over 2 miles (3.2 km) east of Billingford that was a Roman settlement and river (Wensum) crossing (wooden Roman Bridge) point. Some Neolithic and Anglo Saxon artefacts found in Bawdeswell are listed by Norfolk Museums and Archaeology Service. An excavation at The Gables in 1998 revealed a variety of items from prehistoric to post medieval including Roman pot sherds and evidence of Roman field boundary ditches. The village is mentioned in the Domesday Book of 1086 as Balderwella and again in the 'Norwich Domesday Book' of 1291. Alfheah and Godric held Bawdeswell ffom Count Alan, with thirteen freemen, three and a half ploughs, meadow, woodland and ten pigs recorded. Evidence has been found of a church here since about 1100.

Bawdeswell was the home of Chaucer's Reeve in The Reeve's Prologue and Tale in the Canterbury Tales from which the village magazine 'The Reeve's Tale' gets its name. He was "Osewald the Reeve", "Of Northfolk was this reeve of which I telle, Byside a toun men callen Baldeswelle".

There were four coaching inns and a toll gate on a turnpike. It was a busy stopping off point for the changing of horses and coaches, including the mail coach, for travellers including Walsingham pilgrims. As with many villages, all the original pubs closed, mostly in the 1920s, but the Bell Inn stayed until 1970 when it was closed and converted into flats.

The buildings of the tollhouse and of the four original public houses are now residential dwellings within the conservation area of the village. The tollhouse was built in about 1823 and by the 21st century was semi-derelict but in 2002 work commenced to restore and extend it as a residential dwelling now known as Tollgate Cottage. Chaucer House is reputedly the oldest building in the village dating to the 14th or 15th century and up until 1920 was The Crown Inn (previously Bear Inn) after which it was Crown Farm (farmhouse) before being given its current name. The Ram Inn closed in 1929 and is now a private house 'The Willows'.

The centre of the village has been preserved by the creation of a conservation area in 1975.

== All Saints' Church ==
There has been a parish church on this site since circa 1100, but there are no records before 1313 when the current list of some 58 rectors begins. All Saints is believed to be the only Norfolk village church destroyed in World War II, having been hit by an RAF Mosquito bomber from 608 Squadron at RAF Downham Market that crashed in the village in November 1944. Both crew members were killed and there is a memorial plaque in the church made from aircraft parts by John Ames (PCC Secretary 1972–1980 and Churchwarden 1980–1994).

The church was replaced with one of Neo-Georgian design by architect J Fletcher Watson.

Bawdeswell is one of thirteen parishes in the Heart of Norfolk benefice. which includes Billingford, Bintree, Foulsham, Foxley, Guestwick, Guist, North Elmham, Stibbard, Themelthorpe, Twyford, Wood Norton and Worthing. The parish finances are ably supported by "The Friends of Bawdeswell Church", who with various fund raising events and appeals, contribute towards the maintenance of the church fabric and the cost of heating and insuring it.

== Mosquito crash of 1944 ==
At 20:45 on 6 November 1944, Mosquito KB-364 of No. 608 Squadron RAF crashed in the village, tearing down electricity cables on Reepham Road and setting All Saints' Church alight and inflicting significant damage on Barwick House and Chaucer House opposite. Firefighters from the Dereham Fire Brigade and the American contingent at RAF Attlebridge eventually brought the blaze under control after four hours. It is believed that the Mosquito "iced up" on the return from a diversionary air raid on Gelsenkirchen whilst attempting to return to RAF Downham Market. Both crew members were killed in the crash and are commemorated by a plaque in the new Bawdeswell church.

== Places of interest ==
Bawdeswell Hall is a Dutch gabled building dating from 1683. Originally built by a Henry Eglinton it is now owned by the Gurney family. Gurney's Bank was based in Norwich and connected through marriage to Barclays Bank of London with which it merged along with Backhouse's Bank of Darlington and several other Provincial banks in 1896 to form what is now Barclays Bank. Elizabeth Fry, the famous prison reformer, was born a Gurney, and the portrait from which the image previously on the reverse of the £5 note was taken hangs on the main staircase in the hall.

Chaucer House is reputed to be the oldest surviving building in the village. It was badly damaged in the plane crash which destroyed the church in 1944.

Bawdeswell Workhouse was erected in about 1781 as a workhouse for the Bawdeswell Gilbert Union, serving the parishes of Bawdeswell, Billingford, Bintree, Bylaugh, Foxley, Lyng, and Sparham. The building was no longer required when the new Gressenhall workhouse was built in 1835 to serve all the parishes in the new Mitford and Launditch Union. The building was then used as a school. It later became a bakery and shop with a blacksmiths shop in outbuildings and an early petrol pump outside, a pub and a private dwelling.

Bawdeswell Village Hall was moved from the centre of the village on the site of what is now five houses at Old Woods Green to the recreation ground north of the village in the early 1990s. A modern steel and timber structure was designed but was only one third completed with available funding and the actual hall was not built. It had a high-pitched roof and the original plan was for there to be a badminton court in the main hall. Despite these adversities, the hall had reasonable facilities and was well used, but its size restricted it to one activity at a time. A new larger hall was initially planned through Project Bawdeswell but this was taken over by the Village Hall Committee. A new community hall with a larger hall and two further activity rooms, improved toilet, kitchen and storage facilities and an outside patio area, was built with help from the Big Lottery Fund.

Bawdeswell Heath is all that remains of a huge area of common land following the inclosure acts in the late 18th and early to mid-19th centuries. There are 37 acres (15 ha) in total that can be accessed from Dereham Road with parking available about 1/2-mile Southwest of the A1067 or by foot from 'The Layby' in Billingford Road about 1/3-mile West of the A1067. The Heath is administered by a board of trustees except for 2 acres (0.81 ha) administered by the Parish Council as trustees. https://register-of-charities.charitycommission.gov.uk/en/charity-search/-/charity-details/1049881/full-print

== Schools ==
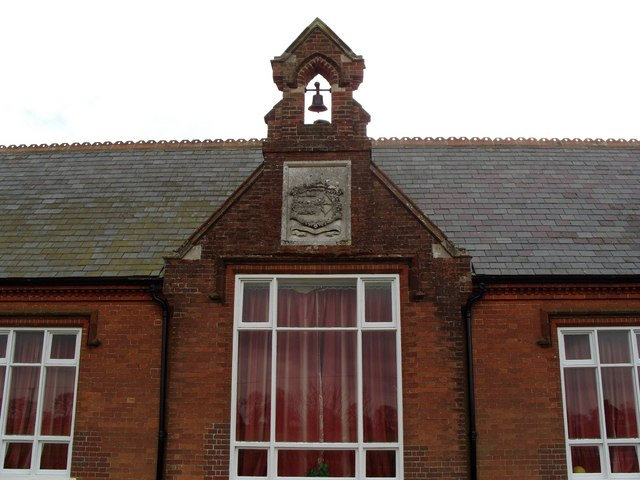
Crest on the bell tower of Bawdeswell School

A free school for twelve boys from Bawdeswell and eight from Foxley was endowed by John Leeds esq. in 1728. From about 1828 there was a school in The Old Workhouse building with up to seventy pupils.

The current village primary school was built in 1875 for Bawdeswell, Bylaugh and Foxley at the sole expense of the Rev Henry Lombe of Bylaugh Hall, who was the Lord of the Manor. His family crest is on the front with the motto "PROPOSITI TENAX" (Firm of Purpose).

Most secondary school children attend Reepham High School.

== Village development ==
There has been significant development in the village since the 1970s with the population, which had declined from 410 at the 1891 census to 331 in 1971, increasing to 574 in 1981, 652 in 1991, 766 in 2001, and to 828 in the 2011 census.

== Transport ==
Bawdeswell is situated on the X29 bus route between Norwich and Fakenham with a regular daytime service. Norwich railway station is 15 1/2 miles (24.9 km) distant by road. There is a service to and from London and frequent trains to Cambridge, Great Yarmouth and Lowestoft, Cromer and Sheringham plus a cross-country service to Liverpool. Norwich International Airport is 13 miles (21 km) by road from Bawdeswell and can be reached in about 25 minutes by car.

== Governance ==
The parish council consists of seven councillors and a parish clerk. The council has ten meetings each year. It is part of the Mid Norfolk Parliamentary Constituency and part of the Elmham and Mattishall Division for Norfolk County Council. The last election was held in May 2017 and elections are held every four years.
