= No. 623 Squadron RAF =

- Active: 10 Aug 1943 – 6 Dec 1943
- Country: United Kingdom
- Branch: Royal Air Force
- Type: inactive
- Role: Bomber Squadron
- Part of: No. 3 Group RAF
- Station: RAF Downham Market

Insignia
- Squadron Codes: IC (Aug 1943 – Dec 1943)

Aircraft flown
- Bomber: Short Stirling

No. 623 Squadron RAF was a heavy bomber squadron of the Royal Air Force for several months in 1943 during the Second World War.

== History ==
The squadron was formed on 10 August 1943 at RAF Downham Market in Norfolk from 'C' Flight of 218 Squadron, as well as receiving crews from No.3 L.F.S. and No.1653 Conversion Unit. It was equipped with Stirling Mk.III bombers, as part of No. 3 Group RAF in Bomber Command. The squadron carried out night raids against Germany, but was short-lived and was disbanded on 6 December 1943 at Downham Market. The aircraft went mostly to conversion units of No. 5 Group RAF.

== Commanding officers ==
Officers commanding No. 623 Squadron RAF, data from
Date	Name	Comments
18 August 1943	W/Cdr. E.J. Little, DFC	Killed in action, 31-08-1943
6 September 1943	W/Cdr. G.T. Wynne-Powell	Moved to 90 Sqn, 29-11-1943
29 November 1943	W/Cdr. F.M. Milligan, AFC	

== Notable personnel ==
Flt Lt John Henry Smythe, a black navigator from Sierra Leone, who was shot down and captured, and later became a Queen's Counsel barrister and the attorney general of Sierra Leone.

== Aircraft operated ==
Aircraft operated by no. 623 Squadron RAF, data from
From	To	Aircraft	Variant
August 1943	December 1943	Short Stirling	Mk.III

Some examples:

- BF568: IC-B ex No. 218 Squadron RAF, later to No. 214 Squadron RAF and 1651 Heavy Conversion Unit (HCU). Struck off charge 24.4.45
- BK727: IC-A ex No. 218 Squadron, later to No. 214 Squadron and 1651 HCU. Struck off charge 24.4.45
- BK803: IC-S and IC-D ex No. 218 Squadron, later to 1654 HCU. Crashed 30.6.44
- EE876: IC-T ex No. 218 Squadron, later to 1654 HCU. Struck off charge 25.4.46
- EE966: IC-E ex No. 218 Squadron, later transferred to No. 299 Squadron RAF. Crashed 11.5.45 at Gardermoen, Norway
- EF199: IC-I to No. 214 Squadron RAF and later to 1651 HCU. Struck off charge 24.4.45
- EF204: IC-E to 1654 Conversion Unit after its service life with No. 623 Squadron, crashed 14.1.45
- EH878: IC-I Failed to return from a bombing mission to Mannheim, 6.9.43
- EH925: IC-C Failed to return from bombing mission to Berlin, 23/24.08.43. Aircraft crashed 10 km south of Zossen, crew killed. Crash site has now been discovered in local area.
- EJ121: IC-Q to 1654 Conversion Unit after its service life with No. 623 Squadron. Struck off charge 28.2.45
- LJ454: IC-E Failed to return from a bombing mission to Mannheim, 19.11.43
- LK387: IC-P Failed to return on 5.12.43 on a mine laying operation at the Friesian Islands

== Operations ==
- Despatched – number of aircraft taking off
- DCO – Duty Carried Out
- Alt – Alternative target attacked
- DNCO – Duty Not Carried Out (sortie aborted)
- Gardening – laying anti-shipping mines in coastal waters
- Comments – code names for area where mines dropped and identity of losses.

Date	Type	Target	Despatched	DCO	Alt	DNCO	Recalled	Lost	Comments
10/11-Aug-43	Stirling	Nürnberg	4	4	0	0	0	0	
12/13-Aug-43	Stirling	Turin	4	4	0	0	0	0	
16/17-Aug-43	Stirling	Turin	5	5	0	0	0	0	
23/24-Aug-43	Stirling	Berlin	6	5	0	0	0	1	EH925
24/25-Aug-43	Stirling	Gardening	2	2	0	0	0	0	Nectarines
25/26-Aug-43	Stirling	Gardening	1	1	0	0	0	0	Deodars
26/27-Aug-43	Stirling	Gardening	2	2	0	0	0	0	Deodars
27/28-Aug-43	Stirling	Nürnberg	5	3	0	1	0	1	EE909
30/31-Aug-43	Stirling	Mönchengladbach	5	4	0	1	0	0	
31/01-Aug-43	Stirling	Berlin	4	2	0	1	0	1	EE949
02/03-Sep-43	Stirling	Gardening	1	0	0	1	0	0	Nectarines
05/06-Sep-43	Stirling	Mannheim	3	2	0	0	0	1	EH878
08/09-Sep-43	Stirling	Boulogne	3	3	0	0	0	0	
15/16-Sep-43	Stirling	Montluçon	3	3	0	0	0	0	
16/17-Sep-43	Stirling	Modane	4	4	0	0	0	0	
22/23-Sep-43	Stirling	Hannover	4	4	0	0	0	0	
23/24-Sep-43	Stirling	Mannheim	3	3	0	0	0	0	
24/25-Sep-43	Stirling	Gardening	3	3	0	0	0	0	Nectarines
25/26-Sep-43	Stirling	Gardening	2	1	0	0	0	1	Nectarines EF499
27/28-Sep-43	Stirling	Hannover	2	2	0	0	0	0	
27/28-Sep-43	Stirling	Gardening	1	1	0	0	0	0	Nectarines
02/03-Oct-43	Stirling	Gardening	2	2	0	0	0	0	Silverthorne
03/04-Oct-43	Stirling	Kassel	5	2	0	1	0	2	EF158 and EH994
04/05-Oct-43	Stirling	Frankfurt am Main	3	2	0	1	0	0	
04/05-Oct-43	Stirling	Gardening	2	2	0	0	0	0	Deodars
07/08-Oct-43	Stirling	Gardening	3	3	0	0	0	0	Nectarines 1, Silverthorne 2
08/09-Oct-43	Stirling	Bremen	4	4	0	0	0	0	
08/09-Oct-43	Stirling	Gardening	1	1	0	0	0	0	Deodars
17/18-Oct-43	Stirling	Gardening	5	5	0	0	0	0	Nectarines
20/21-Oct-43	Stirling	Gardening	2	2	0	0	0	0	Nectarines
22/23-Oct-43	Stirling	Gardening	3	2	0	1	0	0	Nectarines
24/25-Oct-43	Stirling	Gardening	2	2	0	0	0	0	Nectarines
25/26-Oct-43	Stirling	Gardening	2	2	0	0	0	0	
03/04-Nov-43	Stirling	Gardening	4	4	0	0	0	0	
04/05-Nov-43	Stirling	Gardening	2	2	0	0	0	0	
07/08-Nov-43	Stirling	Gardening	5	4	0	0	0	1	Deodars, Furze EF156
10/11-Nov-43	Stirling	Gardening	2	2	0	0	0	0	La Rochelle
18/19-Nov-43	Stirling	Mannheim	7	3	0	2	0	2	EF155 and LJ454
19/20-Nov-43	Stirling	Leverkusen	2	2	0	0	0	0	
19/20-Nov-43	Stirling	Gardening	5	5	0	0	0	0	Nectarines/Cinnamon
22/23-Nov-43	Stirling	Berlin	3	2	1	0	0	0	
25/26-Nov-43	Stirling	Gardening	3	1	0	2	0	0	
04/05-Dec-43	Stirling	Gardening	2	1	0	0	0	1	Nectarines LK387
Totals			138	115	1	11	0	11	

== See also ==
- List of Royal Air Force aircraft squadrons
- List of Royal Air Force heavy conversion units
