= RAF Chedburgh =

Former RAF station in Suffolk, England

RAF Chedburgh
- Chedburgh in England

Site information
- Type: Satellite station 1942-43; 31 Base Substation 1943-
- Code: CU
- Owner: Air Ministry
- Operator: Royal Air Force
- Controlled by: RAF Bomber Command * No. 3 Group RAF * No. 7 (T) Group RAF

Location
- Shown within Suffolk
- Coordinates: 52°10′49″N 000°37′15″E

Site history
- Built: 1941/42
- Built by: John Laing & Son Ltd
- In use: September 1942 - October 1952
- Battles/wars: European theatre of World War II

Airfield information
- Elevation: 125 metres (410 ft) AMSL
Runways
Direction	Length and surface
00/00	Concrete
00/00	Concrete
00/00	Concrete

Royal Air Force Chedburgh or more simply RAF Chedburgh is a former Royal Air Force satellite station located near Bury St Edmunds, Suffolk, UK. The Bury Road Business Park is now located on the site, a principal enterprise being Yara UK Limited's liquid fertilizer production plant.

== History ==
Murray Peden, a Royal Canadian Air Force pilot, recounts in his memoirs flying on his first attack on Germany, from RAF Chedburgh in September 1943. The target was Hanover. He was a new member of No. 214 Squadron RAF, which was equipped with four-engine Stirlings. He describes the long line of aircraft taxiing "ponderously" along a: "...perimeter track [which] ran within a hundred yards of Chedburgh's pub, before which the locals . . . had assembled for their nightly show." In 2018, the pub building still stood, near the northwest corner of the old airfield.

The following units were here at some point:

- No. 23 Heavy Glider Maintenance Section of No. 2 Heavy Glider Maintenance Unit (? - March 1944)
- No. 214 Squadron RAF (1942–43)
- No. 218 Squadron RAF (1944–45)
- No. 301 Polish Bomber Squadron
- No. 304 Polish Bomber Squadron
- No. 620 Squadron RAF (1943)
- No. 1653 Heavy Conversion Unit RAF (November 1943 - November 1944)
