= No. 571 Squadron RAF =

- Active: 7 Apr 1944 – 20 Sep 1945
- Country: United Kingdom
- Branch: Royal Air Force
- Part of: No. 8 (Pathfinder) Group, RAF Bomber Command

Insignia
- Squadron Codes: 8K (Apr 1944 – Sep 1945)

No. 571 Squadron RAF was a Second World War Royal Air Force pathfinder squadron operating the de Havilland Mosquito.

== History ==
The squadron was formed on 7 April 1944 at RAF Downham Market, Norfolk to operate the de Havilland Mosquito XVI as part of the No. 8 (Pathfinder) Group. The main squadron role was to carry out independent raids on German industrial targets using 4,000 lb (1,814 kg) "Cookie" bombs. The squadron moved to RAF Oakington on 22 April 1944 and then, after having flown its last operational mission on 26/27 April 1945, to RAF Warboys on 20 July 1945. No. 571 Squadron was disbanded at Warboys on 20 September 1945.

The squadron carried out 2,681 operational sorties with the Mosquito with a loss of 8 aircraft.

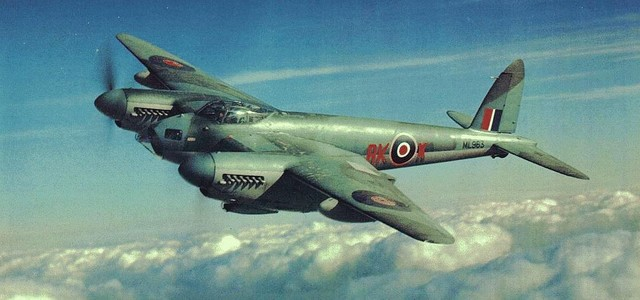
This particular aircraft is, according to "Mosquito" by Sharp & Bowyer, ML963, 8K-K "King" of 571 Squadron, the picture having been taken on 30 September 1944, after the aircraft had completed repairs at Hatfield. ML963 was first issued to 109 Squadron on 9 March 1944, going on to 692 Squadron on the 24th of the same month, and then on to 571 on 19 April 1944. It was damaged in action on 12 May 1944 but returned to the Squadron on 23 October of that year. Barry Blunt's history of 571 Squadron says ML963 completed 84 operations with the Squadron, 31 of them to Berlin (one of the others was a low-level sortie to skip-bomb a 4,000 lb bomb into the Bitburg Tunnel, undertaken on New Year's Day, 1945. The crew were Flt Lt Norman J Griffiths & Flg Off WR Ball). Its final sortie came on 10/11 April 1945, when it was abandoned following an engine fire. The crew of F/O R.D. Oliver and F/S L.M. Young both returned safely to the Squadron later that month

== Aircraft operated ==
Aircraft operated by no. 571 Squadron RAF, data from
From	To	Aircraft	Variant	Notes
April 1944	September 1945	de Havilland Mosquito	Mk.XVI	Twin-engined light bomber

== Squadron bases ==
Bases and airfields used by no. 571 Squadron, data from
From	To	Base	Remark
7 April 1944	24 April 1944	RAF Downham Market, Norfolk	Det. at RAF Graveley, Huntingdonshire
24 April 1944	20 July 1945	RAF Oakington, Cambridgeshire	
20 July 1945	20 September 1945	RAF Warboys, Huntingdonshire	

== Commanding officers ==
Officers commanding no. 571 Squadron RAF, data from
From	To	Name
April 1944	November 1944	W/Cdr. J.M. Birkin, DSO, DFC, AFC
November 1944	March 1945	W/Cdr. R.J. Gosnell, DSO, DFC
March 1945	September 1945	W/Cdr. R.W. Bray, DFC
