= Bexwell =

Village in Norfolk, England

Coordinates: 52.60°N 00.40°E

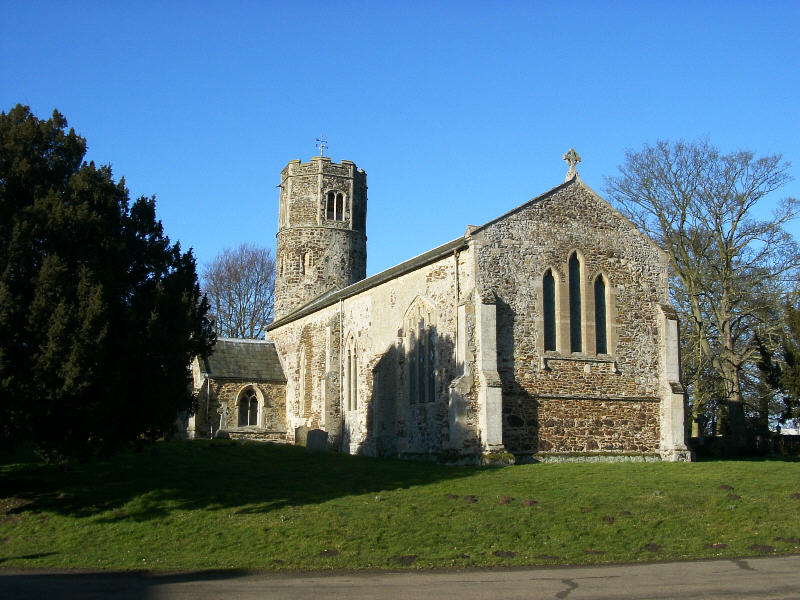
- Bexwell St Mary

- Location within Norfolk
- Civil parish: Ryston
- District: King's Lynn and West Norfolk
- Shire county: Norfolk
- Region: East
- Country: England
- Sovereign state: United Kingdom
- Post town: DOWNHAM MARKET
- Postcode district: PE38
- Dialling code: 01366
- Police: Norfolk
- Fire: Norfolk
- Ambulance: East of England
- UK Parliament: South West Norfolk

Bexwell is a village in the civil parish of Ryston, in the King's Lynn and West Norfolk district, in the county of Norfolk, England. It is located 1 mile (1.6 km) from Downham Market.

== History ==
The name Bexwell is of Anglo-Saxon origin and the village is mentioned in the Domesday Book of 1086 as consisting of 18 households in the hundred of Clackclose. At this time, Bexwell was divided into the estates of Roger Bigod, the Abbey of St. Etheldreda, Henry de Ferrers and Reginald, son of Ivo.

St. Mary's Church is one of the 124 existing Round-tower churches in Norfolk. It was likely built during the 12th century and contains memorials to Henry Bexwell and Francis Bachcroft within. The church was restored in the 19th century and was further refurbished in the 1980s by local fundraising.

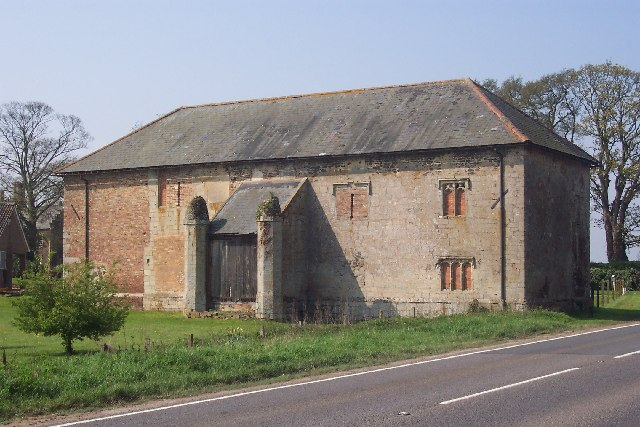
Stone barn at Bexwell

There is also a late 15th century stone barn which stands adjacent to the A1122 King's Lynn to Colchester road. It is likely that this structure was built as a gatehouse to Ryston Hall and was later repurposed as a barn. It was re-roofed in the 20th century. The building has been Grade II listed since 1984.

Bexwell Hall Farmhouse was built in the late 16th century but has been extensively remodelled since. This structure has been Grade II listed since 1989.

In the 1931 Census, Bexwell had a population of 60. On 1 April 1935, the parish was abolished and merged with Ryston.

Some parts of Bexwell were part of RAF Downham Market during the Second World War.

The village is part of the electoral ward of Ryston for local elections and is part of the district of King's Lynn and West Norfolk. It is in the South West Norfolk parliamentary constituency.
