= James Fletcher-Watson =

James Fletcher-Watson (25 July 1913 – 12 June 2004) was a British watercolourist and architect.

== Biography ==
Fletcher-Watson was born at Coulsdon (then in Surrey, now in the London Borough of Croydon), but grew up in Norfolk. He was educated at Eastbourne College, then studied at the former Royal Academy School of Architecture under Edwin Lutyens and Albert Richardson. During World War II he served with the Royal Engineers in India and designed airfields for the invasion of Burma, including the former RAF Imphal (now Imphal International Airport). His sketches from that time were published in Soldier Artist in Wartime India. As a watercolour painter he was influenced by the Norwich School of painters who were inspired by the natural beauty of the Norfolk landscape. His paintings were exhibited regularly at the Royal Academy, and he was a member of the Royal Institute of Painters in Water Colours and of the Royal Society of British Artists.

== Publications ==
- The Magic of Watercolour, B.T. Batsford, 1987
- Outdoor Painting, B.T. Batsford, 1993
- Soldier Artist in Wartime India, Country Heritage, 2000
- Watercolour Secrets, Batsford, 2003
