= RAF Downham Market =

Former Royal Air Force station in Norfolk, England

RAF Downham Market
- Downham Market, Norfolk in England

Site information
- Type: Royal Air Force station * Satellite station 1942-44 * Parent station 1944-46
- Code: DO
- Owner: Air Ministry
- Operator: Royal Air Force
- Controlled by: RAF Bomber Command * No. 3 Group RAF * No. 8 (PFF) Group RAF

Location
- Location in Norfolk RAF Downham Market (the United Kingdom)
- Coordinates: 52°36′33″N 000°24′26″E

Site history
- Built: 1941/42
- Built by: W. & C. French Ltd
- In use: July 1942 – October 1946
- Battles/wars: European theatre of World War II

Airfield information
- Elevation: 36 metres (118 ft) AMSL
Runways
Direction	Length and surface
09/27	1,740 metres (5,709 ft) Concrete
03/21	1,290 metres (4,232 ft) Concrete
16/34	1,290 metres (4,232 ft) Concrete

Royal Air Force Downham Market, or more simply RAF Downham Market, was a Royal Air Force station in the west of the county of Norfolk, England, which operated during the second half of the Second World War.

== History ==
RAF Downham Market opened as a satellite station for RAF Marham in the summer of 1942. The station was equipped with three concrete runways, one of 1,900 yards and two of 1,400 yards. Originally there were 36 hardstandings, although this dropped to 34 when an additional B1 hangar was added in the north west of the station. Six T2 hangars were built, three of which were for the storage of gliders. Accommodation was provided for 1,719 males and 326 females, with Bexwell Hall being used as the officer's mess. In October 1943 the station was equipped with the FIDO fog dispersal system.

The first operational squadron at the station was 218 Squadron, operating Short Stirling aircraft, who arrived from Marham in July 1942. In August 1943, 623 Squadron formed at Downham, also operating Stirling aircraft. This Squadron was disbanded four months later, when the station was re-equipped with Avro Lancaster aircraft. 214 Squadron operated briefly from Downham Market during December 1943 and January 1944.

In March 1944 the station passed to No. 8 Group, with 218 Squadron leaving for RAF Woolfox Lodge, being replaced by 635 Squadron, also using Lancaster aircraft. 571 Squadron, equipped with de Havilland Mosquito aircraft, formed at Downham in April 1944, but had moved to RAF Oakington within a month.

608 Squadron re-formed at Downham in August, equipped with Canadian-built Mosquito aircraft as part of No. 8 Group's policy of having one Lancaster and one Mosquito squadron at each base.

No. 608 and 635 Squadron's operated from Downham to the end of the war, and both were disbanded in late summer of 1945. 170 aircraft either failed to return or crashed during the operations from RAF Downham Market; 109 Stirlings, 40 Lancasters and 21 Mosquitoes, including Mosquito KB364 which crashed on Bawdeswell church.

On 2 May 1945, sixteen 608 Squadron Mosquitoes based at Downham Market were among the aircraft that carried out the final World War 2 RAF bombing raid on Germany.

=== Based units ===
Based units:

- No. 214 Squadron RAF (1943-44)
- No. 218 Squadron RAF (1942-44)
- No. 571 Squadron RAF (1944)
- No. 608 Squadron RAF (1944-45)
- No. 623 Squadron RAF (1943)
- No. 635 Squadron RAF (1944-45)
- No. 14 Heavy Glider Maintenance Section of No. 2 Heavy Glider Maintenance Unit RAF
- Satellite for No. 274 Maintenance Unit RAF (October 1945)
- No. 2722 Squadron RAF Regiment

== Current use ==
After closure as an operational airfield in 1946, the airfield remained in a derelict state until it was finally sold in 1957. In approximately 1950 a large proportion of the "domestic" site was re-developed as a short term housing estate, renamed "Stone Cross Estate", which finally closed in 1963. The airfield remained almost intact until the construction of the Downham Market by-pass (A10) in the late 1970s when much of the runways / taxiways were used as hard core for the road project. Today the majority of the site has been returned to agriculture, with the technical site becoming an industrial estate. There is an unmanned radio relay station located in one corner of the former base. All the runways have now been removed. There had been a small section remaining alongside the A10 just before the A134 roundabout but that was removed during the latter half of 2016. A large metal tower, which had been a local landmark for years, was removed some years ago.

Adjacent to St Mary's Church, Bexwell, and opposite the former guardroom, stands a small plaque commemorating the two Victoria Cross recipients who flew from RAF Downham Market, Ian Bazalgette VC DFC and Arthur Aaron VC DFM. In 2023 a larger memorial on New Road, north of the A1122, was dedicated to the air crews who flew from the station

== See also ==
- List of Norfolk airfields
- List of former Royal Air Force stations
