= No. 608 Squadron RAuxAF =

No. 608 (North Riding) Squadron RAuxAF
- Active: 17 March 1930 – 31 July 1944; 1 August 1944 – 24 August 1945; 10 May 1946 – 10 March 1957
- Country: United Kingdom
- Branch: Royal Air Force
- Part of: Royal Auxiliary Air Force
- Nickname: North Riding "Thornaby's own"
- Mottos: Latin: Omnibus ungulis (Translation: "With all talons")
- Battle honours: Channel & North Sea, 1939; Baltic, 1941–42; Mediterranean, 1942–43; Sicily, 1943; Anzio & Nettuno; France & Germany, 1944–45; German Ports, 1944–45; These seven honours are all emblazoned on the squadron standard

Commanders
- Honorary Air Commodore: Viscount Swinton (1934–1957)
- Notable commanders: Denis Finlay (1943-1944)

Insignia
- Squadron Badge heraldry: A falcon's leg, erased, belled and fessed The falcon's leg indicates the squadron's readiness to go into the air at any time and attack tooth and nail
- Squadron Codes: PG (Oct 1938 – Sep 1939); UL (Sep 1939 – 1942); 6T (1944 – 1945,1949 – Apr 1951); RAO (May 1946 – 1949)

No. 608 (North Riding) Squadron was an Auxiliary Air Force squadron of the Royal Air Force during the Second World War. It flew during its existence as a bomber, fighter and reconnaissance unit and was the only RAF squadron to be equipped with the unsuccessful Blackburn Botha torpedo bomber.

== History ==
=== Formation and early years: Wapitis and Demons ===
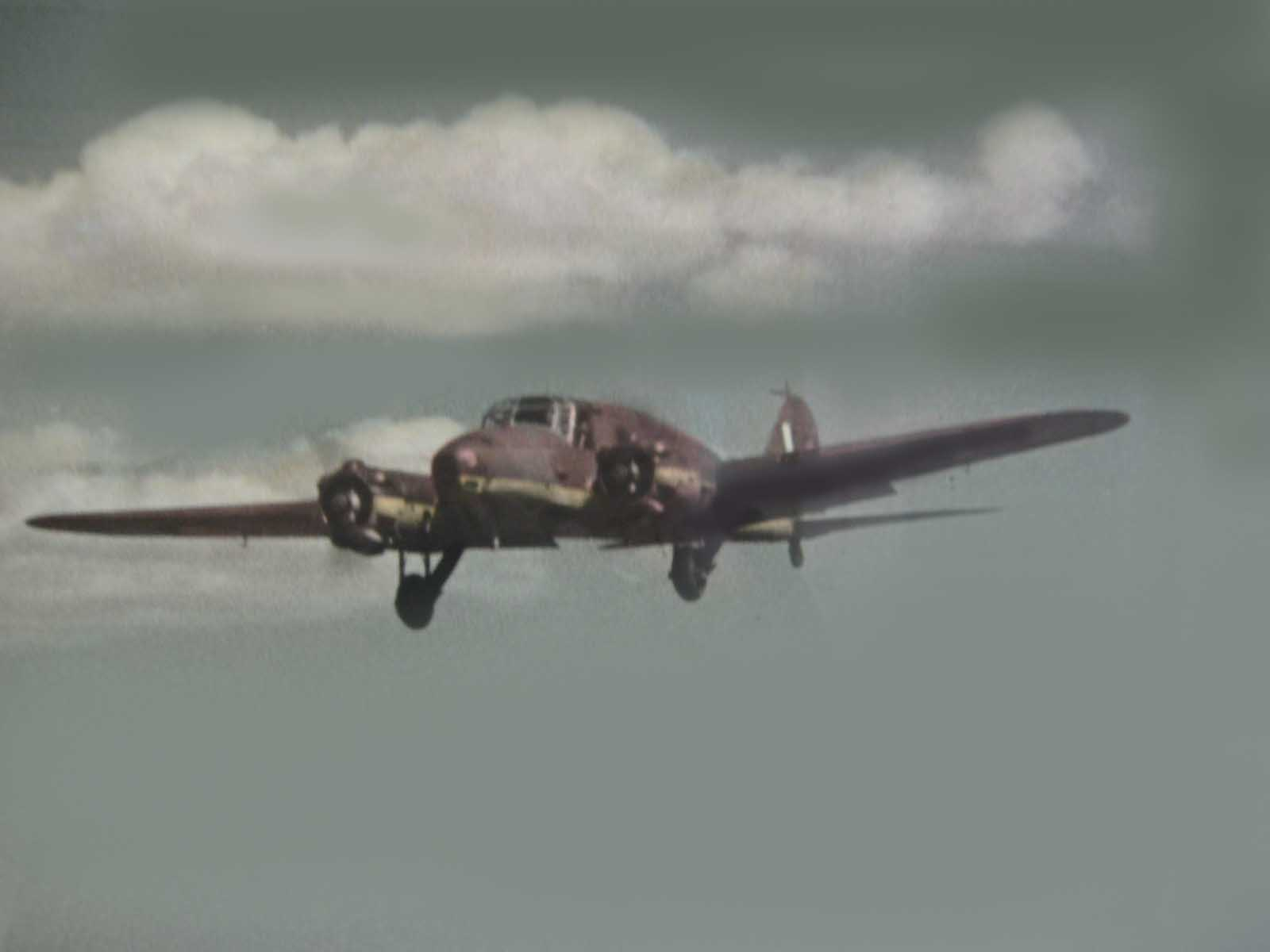
An Avro Anson.

No. 608 Squadron was formed at Thornaby-on-Tees, North Yorkshire as No. 608 County of York (North Riding) Squadron, on 17 March 1930 as a day bomber squadron within the Auxiliary Air Force. Its initial equipment was the Avro 504 N and Westland Wapiti, which the squadron flew until they were replaced with Hawker Demon fighters in January 1937, when the squadrons role was changed to that of a fighter squadron. In May 1937 the name of the squadron was changed to No. 608 (North Riding) Squadron. Shortly before the Second World War broke out, on 20 March 1939, the squadron's role was changed yet again, now into that of a general reconnaissance unit flying under RAF Coastal Command and they were re-equipped for that role with Avro Ansons.

=== Second World War ===
==== Reconnaissance with Ansons, Bothas, Blenheims and Hudsons ====
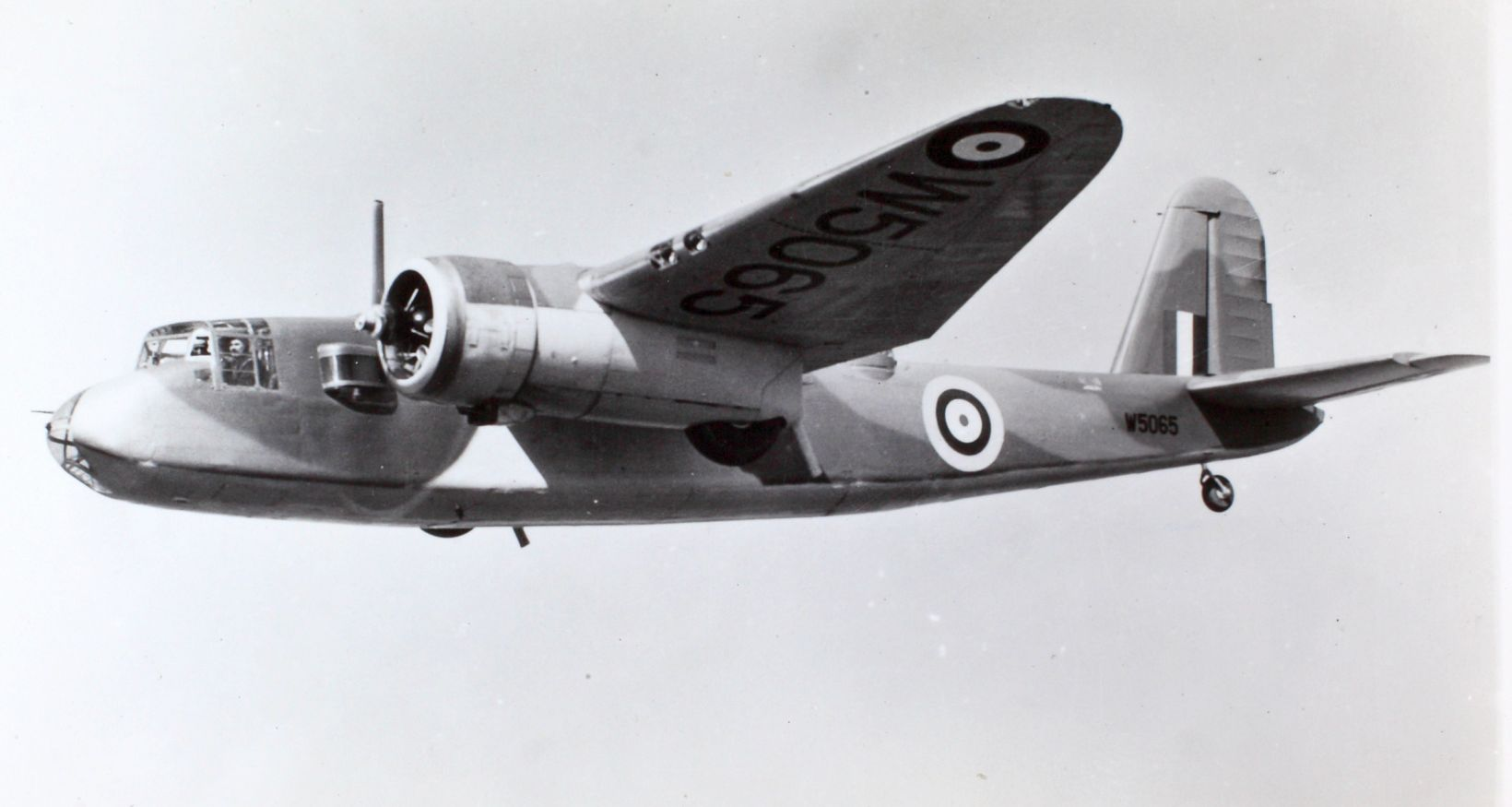
A Blackburn Botha.

The squadron started the war flying the Anson. In June 1940, it began the process of transferring to the Blackburn Botha torpedo bomber, being the only squadron to use this type operationally. The Botha was found to be unsatisfactory, and by December 1940 the squadron was using its Avro Ansons again. These soldiered on until February 1941, when Bristol Blenheim Mk.IVs arrived. However, these were soon replaced by Lockheed Hudsons, which the squadron flew from bases in Scotland, North Africa and Italy until 31 July 1944, when it was disbanded at Pomigliano, Italy.

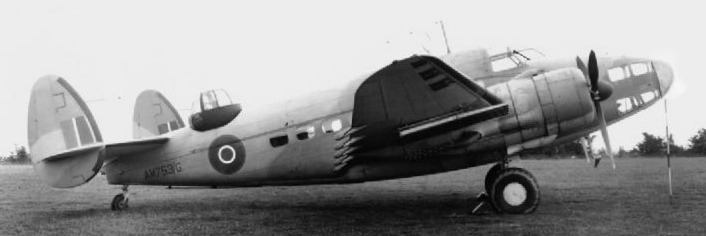
A Lockheed Hudson Mk.V

==== Pathfinding with Mosquitos ====
The squadron was reformed on 1 August 1944 at RAF Downham Market, Norfolk as a Mosquito squadron in No 8 (Pathfinder) Groups Light Night Striking Force. In this role it carried out night attacks on Germany. On 2 May 1945, a Mosquito from 608 squadron dropped a 4,000lb bomb on the naval port at Kiel. It was the last British bombing raid of the war against Nazi Germany.

It disbanded on 28 August 1945 at Downham Market.

=== Post-war reformation: Mosquitos, Spitfires and Vampires ===
No. 608 squadron was reformed on 10 May 1946 at Thornaby in its original role as a light bomber squadron in the Royal Auxiliary Air Force. It had however no operational aircraft before being redesignated as a night fighter unit in July 1947, when it received Mosquito NF.30s. These were flown until the squadron changed role yet again, this time to that of a day fighter squadron, receiving Spitfire F.22s in May 1948. From December 1949 these were gradually replaced with de Havilland Vampires, which the squadron flew until, along with all the flying units of the RAuxAF, it was disbanded on 10 March 1957.

== Aircraft operated ==
Aircraft operated by no. 608 Squadron RAF, data from
From	To	Aircraft	Version
June 1930	January 1937	Westland Wapiti	Mk.IIa
January 1937	March 1939	Hawker Demon	
March 1939	April 1941	Avro Anson	Mk.I
June 1940	December 1940	Blackburn Botha	Mk.I
February 1941	August 1941	Bristol Blenheim	Mk.I
March 1941	July 1941	Bristol Blenheim	Mk.IV
July 1941	July 1944	Lockheed Hudson	Mk.V
March 1943	July 1944	Lockheed Hudson	Mk.VI
June 1943	July 1944	Lockheed Hudson	Mk.IIIa
August 1944	April 1945	de Havilland Mosquito	Mk.XX
October 1944	April 1945	de Havilland Mosquito	Mk.XXV
March 1945	August 1945	de Havilland Mosquito	Mk.XVI
July 1947	January 1949	de Havilland Mosquito	NF.30
May 1948	January 1951	Supermarine Spitfire	F.22
December 1949	July 1953	de Havilland Vampire	F.3
May 1951	June 1951	de Havilland Vampire	F.1
April 1952	March 1957	de Havilland Vampire	FB.5
April 1956	February 1957	de Havilland Vampire	FB.9

== Squadron bases ==
Bases and airfields used by no. 608 Squadron RAF, data from
From	To	Base
17 March 1930	14 January 1942	RAF Thornaby, North Yorkshire (Det. at RAF Bircham Newton, Dyce)
14 January 1942	5 August 1942	RAF Wick, Caithness, Scotland
5 August 1942	27 August 1942	RAF Sumburgh, Shetland, Scotland
27 August 1942	14 September 1942	RAF Gosport, Hampshire
14 September 1942	29 October 1942	RAF North Coates, Lincolnshire
29 October 1942	9 November 1942	en route to North Africa
9 November 1942	14 November 1942	RAF Gibraltar
14 November 1942	6 August 1943	RAF Blida, Algeria
6 August 1943	4 September 1943	Protville Airfield, Tunisia
4 September 1943	23 October 1943	Borizzo Airfield, Sicily (Det. at Grottaglie)
23 October 1943	23 June 1943?	Montecorvino Airfield, Italy
23 June 1943?	31 July 1944	Pomigliano, Italy
1 August 1944	28 August 1945	RAF Downham Market, Norfolk
10 May 1946	16 June 1951	RAF Thornaby, North Yorkshire
16 June 1951	12 July 1951	RAF Leuchars, Fife, Scotland
12 July 1951	10 March 1957	RAF Thornaby, North Yorkshire

== Commanding officers ==
Officers commanding no. 608 squadron RAF, data from
From	To	Name
March 1930	1932	S/Ldr. W. Howard-Davies
1932	December 1934	S/Ldr. I.W.H. Thomson
December 1934	December 1938	S/Ldr. G.H. Ambler
December 1938	May 1941	W/Cdr. G. Shaw, DFC
May 1941	November 1941	W/Cdr. R.S. Derbyshire
November 1941	February 1943	W/Cdr. P.D.R. Hutchings, AFC
February 1943	December 1943	W/Cdr. C.M.M. Grece, DFC
December 1943	July 1944	W/Cdr. Denis Finlay OBE
August 1944	November 1944	W/Cdr. W.W.G. Scott DFC
November 1944	April 1945	W/Cdr. R.C. Alabaster, DSO, DFC
April 1945	August 1945	W/Cdr. K. Gray
July 1946	1950	S/Ldr. W.A. Brown, DFC
1950	1952	S/Ldr. F.A. Robinson
1952	1955	S/Ldr. G.A. Martin, DFC, AFC
1955	March 1957	S/Ldr. H.D. Costain
