= No. 635 Squadron RAF =

- Active: 20 March 1944 – 1 September 1945
- Country: United Kingdom
- Branch: Royal Air Force
- Type: Inactive
- Role: Bomber Squadron
- Part of: No. 8 Group RAF Bomber Command
- Base: RAF Downham Market, Norfolk
- Mottos: Latin: Nos Ducimus Ceteri Secunter (Translation: "We lead, others follow")

Insignia
- Squadron Badge heraldry: In front of a roundel nebuly, a dexter gauntlet holding three flashes of lightning
- Squadron Codes: F2 (Mar 1944 – Sep 1945)

Aircraft flown
- Bomber: Avro Lancaster; Four-engined heavy bomber

No. 635 Squadron RAF was a heavy bomber squadron of the Royal Air Force during the Second World War.

== History ==
635 squadron was formed at RAF Downham Market in Norfolk on 20 March 1944 from two flights drawn from No. 35 Squadron and No. 97 Squadron, equipped with Lancaster Mk.I bombers, as part of No. 8 Group RAF in Bomber Command. It re-equipped with Lancaster Mk.III bombers the same month, then Lancaster Mk.VI bombers in July. After the end of its bombing operations in April 1945 it was used for transport and food relief until disbanded at Downham Market on 1 September 1945.

== Notable squadron members ==
One member of the squadron, S/Ldr. I.W. Bazalgette, was awarded a posthumous VC following the raid against Trossy-St Maximin on 4 August 1944.

== Aircraft operated ==
Aircraft operated by No. 635 Squadron RAF
From	To	Aircraft	Version
March 1944	March 1944	Avro Lancaster	Mk.I
March 1944	August 1945	Avro Lancaster	Mk.III
July 1944	November 1944	Avro Lancaster	Mk.VI

== Squadron bases ==
Base used by No. 635 Squadron RAF
From	To	Base
20 March 1944	1 September 1945	RAF Downham Market, Norfolk
