= No. 214 Squadron RAF =

No. 214 (Federated Malay States) Squadron RAF
- Active: 1917–1920; 1935–1977
- Country: United Kingdom
- Branch: Royal Air Force
- Nickname: Federated Malay States
- Mottos: Latin: Ultor in umbris ("Avenging in the shadows")

Insignia
- Squadron heraldry: A nightjar volant affrontée
- Squadron codes: 214 (Jan 1937–Apr 1939); UX (Apr 1939–Sep 1939); BU (Sep 1939–Jul 1945); QN, PX* (Nov 1946–Apr 1951, *only used by "C" Flight)

.

No. 214 Squadron is a former unit of the Royal Air Force.

== History ==
=== World War I ===
No 214 Squadron was formed from No. 14 Squadron Royal Naval Air Service (RNAS), itself formerly No. 7A Squadron RNAS only taking on the new number on 9 December 1917. With the creation of the RAF from the Royal Flying Corps and the RNAS on 1 April 1918 it received the number 214. It was later given the fuller title No 214 (Federated Malay States) Squadron.

No. 214 Squadron started with the Handley Page Type O/100 bomber but soon got the more powerful O/400 in the middle of 1918 with which it continued to fly against German strategic targets. From 29 June to 23 October 1918, 214 Squadron was based at RAF Saint Inglevert.

=== Between the Wars ===
Post war the squadron was moved to Egypt but it was disbanded on 1 February 1920 with its crew and aircraft merged into No. 216 Squadron RAF.

On 16 September 1935 the personnel and equipment of 'B' Flight of No. 9 Squadron RAF were used to create a new No. 214 (B) Squadron at RAF Boscombe Down, Wiltshire, flying the Vickers Virginia Mk. X bomber. (Note: No.9 squadron were in the process of upgrading from the Virginia to the Handley Page Heyford) In October 1935 the unit moved to RAF Andover, taking part in exercises at RAF Aldergrove, Belfast, in September 1936. On returning from Northern Ireland, the squadron flew directly to a new base, RAF Scampton, Lincs, but in October 1936 seven of their Virginia aircraft were damaged on the ground due to 70 mph winds. Shortly afterwards, in January 1937, the squadron began re-equipping with the Handley Page H.P.54 Harrow.

On 25 March 1937, whilst ferrying 214 squadron pilots to the Handley Page factory at Radlett aerodrome to collect new Harrow aircraft, Harrow K6940 clipped an express train travelling at 60 mph, ripping the roof off the kitchen car. Fortunately there were no fatalities either on board the Harrow, or the train, but the aircraft crash-landed and was written off.

In April 1937, the squadron moved again to RAF Feltwell in Norfolk. In another incident involving their new aircraft, two Harrows (out of a formation of three) collided in mid-air whilst practising for a display. All five personnel on board the two aircraft were killed.

At this time, No.214 Squadron itself parented another unit, when 'B' Flight became the nucleus of the re-formed No. 37 Squadron RAF.

On 6 October 1938, 214 squadron lost another Harrow, this time to a lightning strike; all six crew parachuted to safety. This was one of three Harrows lost on that date, all on night exercises, all due to lightning strikes, the other two aircraft coming from 215 squadron.

=== World War II ===
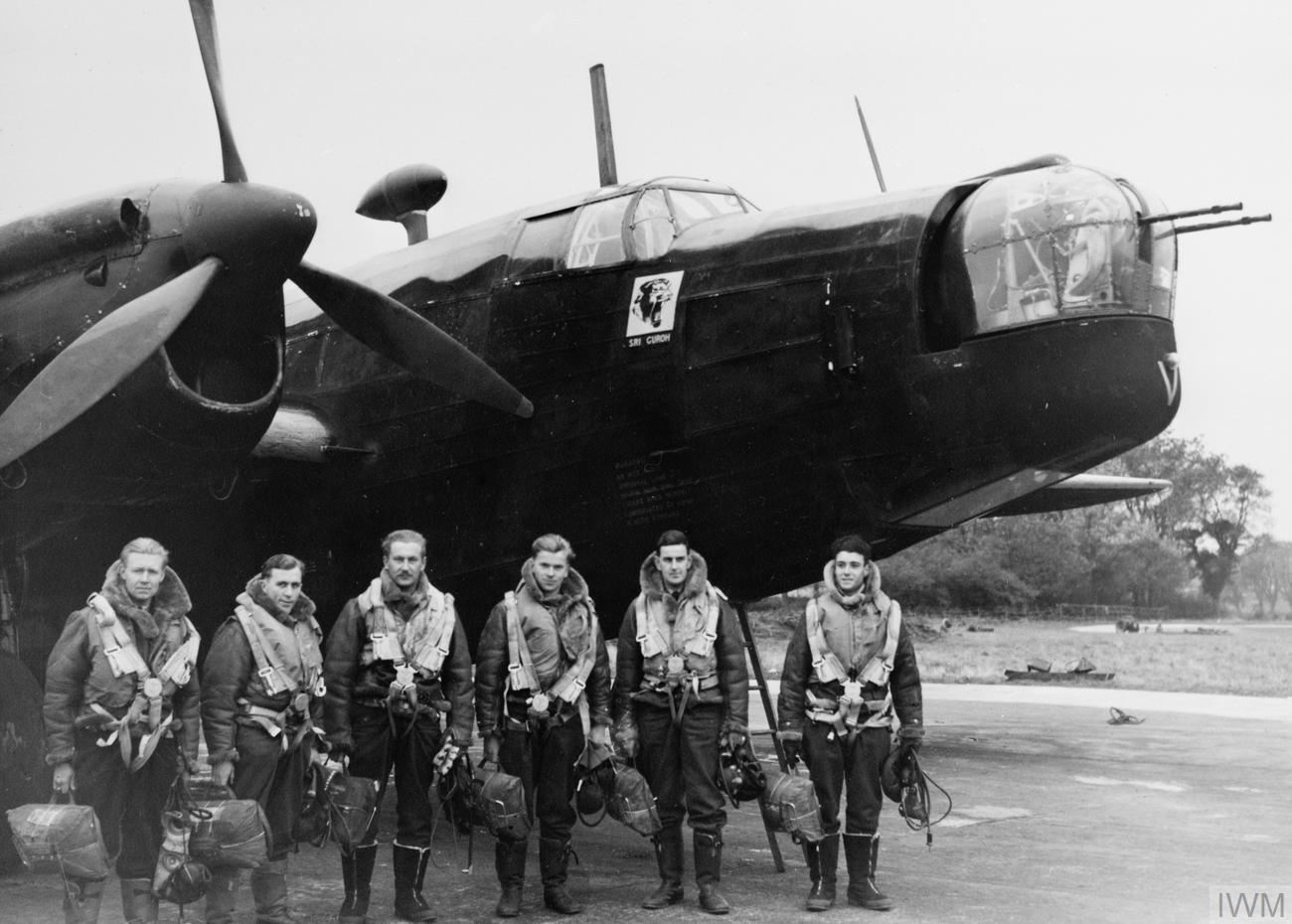
Crew of a Wellington II of 214 Squadron at RAF Stradishall before a raid on Essen.

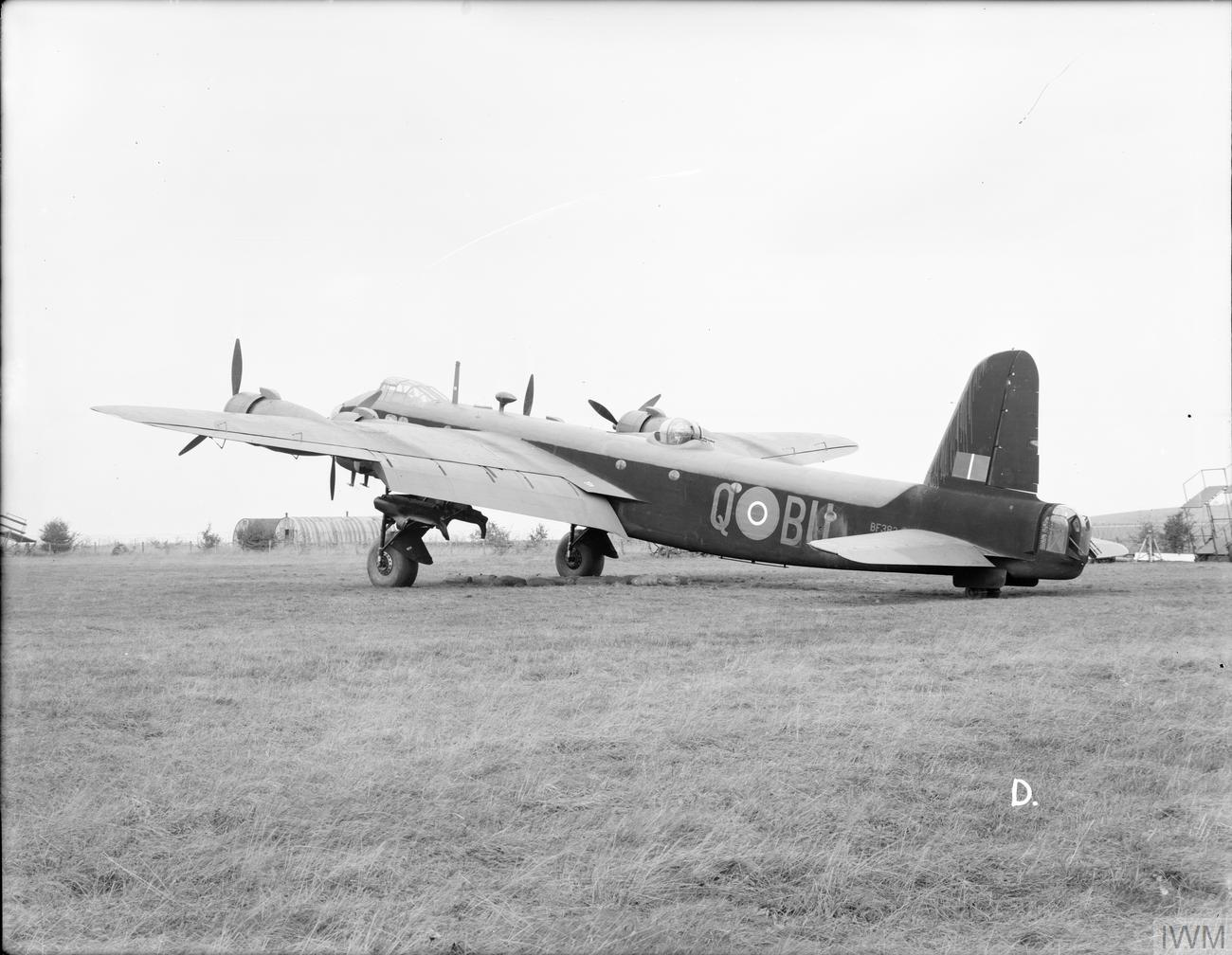
Retired 214 Squadron Stirling at RAF Stradishall.

At the outbreak of the Second World War No. 214 squadron was designated as a training unit. The squadron immediately re-positioned to Feltwell's satellite airfield, RAF Methwold, whilst in the process of re-equipping with the Vickers Wellington. In February 1940 they moved from Methwold to RAF Stradishall. The Wellingtons were replaced in 1942 with the larger Short Stirling.

Later, the Squadron moved to RAF Chedburgh. The memoirs of a Royal Canadian Air Force pilot recount his first operation with the Squadron, with Stirlings taxiing "ponderously" along a: "...perimeter track [which] ran within a hundred yards of Chedburgh's pub, before which the locals . . . had assembled for their nightly show." The target was Hanover.

At a time when Stirling losses led to the aircraft being withdrawn from bombing Germany the squadron transferred to RAF Downham Market in December 1943. In January 1944, the squadron was converted to special operations, joining No. 100 Group RAF for electronic countermeasures in support of the main bombing operations.

The squadron used the Boeing Fortress Mk II and Mk III and Stirlings. They used the jamming system codenamed "Airborne Cigar" (ABC) to block German night fighter communications. German speaking radio operators would identify and jam the ground controllers broadcasts and also pose as ground controllers themselves with the intention of steering the night fighters away from the bomber streams. At least some of No. 214 Squadron's B-17s were equipped with 'Piperack' which countered the Germans' Lichtenstein SN-2 aerial intercept radar.

After the war ended, No. 214 Squadron reformed at RAF Aldergrove on 1 March 1948 and operated the Handley Page Halifax GR.6 until 18 October 1948.

=== Postwar ===
In July 1955 the squadron was scheduled to be formed at RAF Laarbruch in West Germany, as part of Royal Air Force Germany, but before formation could be completed instructions were received that the new forming squadron would be designated No. 80 Squadron RAF.

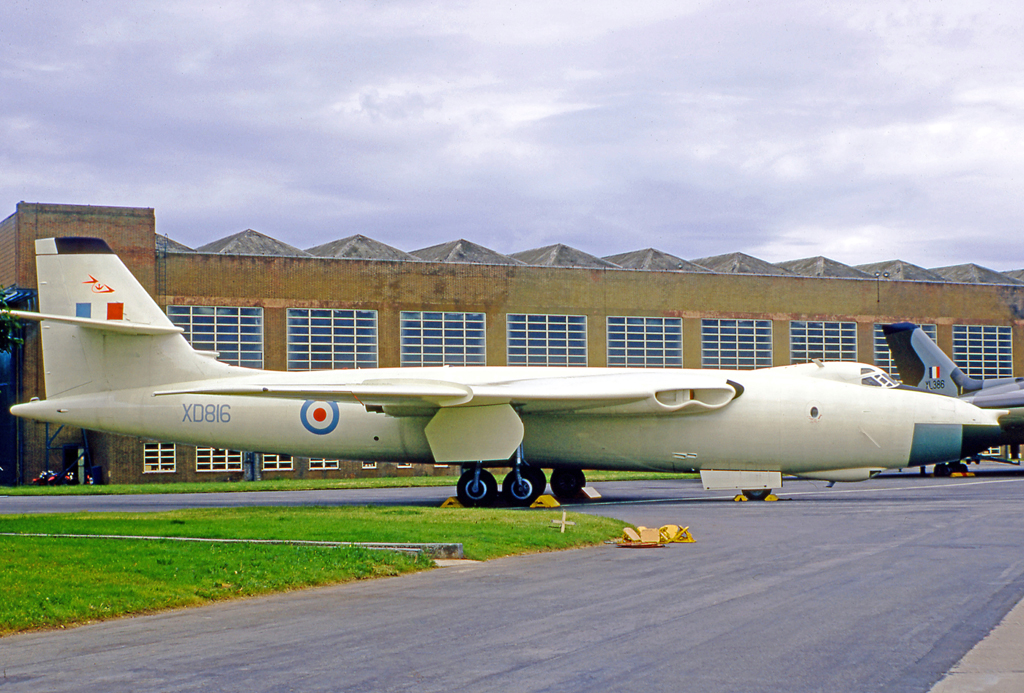
Vickers Valiant BK.1 XD816 wearing anti-nuclear flash finish and the markings of No. 214 Squadron on its fin.

It operated the Vickers Valiant from RAF Marham, from 21 January 1956 until 28 February 1965. Leonard Trent, a Victoria Cross winner, was the first CO of the Valiant squadron, and he was succeeded by future Chief of the Air Staff and Marshal of the RAF Michael Beetham. The Valiant was at first active as a V bomber but was then converted to the tanker role with the addition of a Hose Drum Unit (HDU or "HooDoo" in the bomb bay.

Disbanded in 1965 No. 214 Squadron reformed the following year with the Handley Page Victor tanker and continued until disbanded finally in 1977.

== Accidents and incidents ==
- On 29 April 1937, two new Handley Page Harrows from RAF Feltwell collided in mid-air over Wissington, Norfolk and crashed with the loss of five airmen. It was reported that a wing-tip of one aircraft contacted the tail of the other, one falling into a field and bursting into flames, and the other crashing into the River Wissey.
- On 10/11 August 1943, Flight Sergeant Harry Ernest Hall was pilot of a crippled aircraft which was returning from operations, after losing an engine. When approaching Bexhill on the South Coast of England the aircraft ran out of fuel and dived almost out of control into the sea. The crew were temporarily knocked out by the impact and the aircraft filled rapidly with water. F/S Hall was the first to recover and his first thoughts were for the safety of his crew. He found the wireless operator injured and floating just below the astrodome, and in spite of the rapidly rising water and with complete disregard for his own safety, he succeeded in extricating him from the aircraft and securing him safely in a dingy. He then returned to the aircraft to search for the navigator and flight engineer who were missing. Five members of the crew were subsequently picked up by an air/sea rescue launch, two died. In a desperate situation, aggravated by darkness, F/S Hall displayed extreme courage and coolness throughout. Unfortunately F/S Hall was killed on operations six weeks later. For his exploits F/S Hall was awarded the British Empire Medal by His Majesty King George VI, presented to his mother posthumously.
- On 19 August 1968 Victor K1 XH646 collided in mid-air near Holt, Norfolk in bad weather with a 213 Squadron English Electric Canberra WT325, all four crew members of the Victor and all three on board the Canberra died.

== In popular culture ==
214 Squadron's real-life WWII bomber operations and crews at RAF Stradishall formed the basis for the 1948 and 1949 BBC Radio drama "I Shan't Be Home To Dinner", written by BBC Radio actress Freda Falconer, widow of 214 Squadron Observer Flt/Lt Keith Falconer D.F.C. The play also successfully toured the UK in 1949–1950 as a stage production. Like many other RAF wives, the author chose to live by her husband's side throughout his active service, in off-base billets. She drew on her background to spearhead the drive to keep morale high on the base with her work organising concert parties and entertainment.

The play explored the powerful sense of family and mutual support engendered on the WWII RAF airfields, recording what daily life was like on the ground both for the aircrews and the wives, lovers and families who also served by their very presence and support. Written to pay tribute to the bravery of airmen, the play is very likely unique as war play written by a woman which for the first time also shone a light on the ground support of the "wives who waited" throughout the war, also one of the only dramas written by a woman to be produced in the flagship prime-time BBC Radio Saturday Night Theatre slot.

Once Russia entered the war, No 214 Squadron would play its part in Churchill's urgent drive to prove that the RAF could take the fight as far as Berlin itself. A wave of 197 bombers were launched 7 and 8 September 1941 attempting long-range targets over and around Berlin, including Wellingtons from 214 Squadron. Flt/Lt Keith Falconer had completed his tour of duty and was now due to transfer to Bramscote for a period as an instructor. Unusually the squadron's new CO, Wg Cdr G L Cruickshanks D.F.C. himself flew Vickers Wellington R1784 on the 8th September 1941 mission with a hand-picked volunteer crew: Sgt Leonard Tyne Chapman (Wireless Operator / Air Gunner), Sqn/Ldr William Davies, Fg/Off William Esplen, (Wireless Operator / Air Gunner), Flt/Lt Keith James Falconer (Observer) and Sgt Arthur Norman Page. 214 Squadron lost only one Wellington - R1874 - with all six of its crew killed in action over Berlin. They were eventually buried together in the Pichelsberg War Cemetery, Berlin, their final sacrifice not required by duty but given voluntarily. Prior to his service career, Wing-Commander Grahame Cruickshanks was a noted South African cricketer. Also of note, the mission's Wireless Operator William Esplen was a successful amateur racing driver and son of the founder of the famous Ercol furniture design company. Freda Falconer told their story, with names changed, in the first version of the play broadcast as a BBC Radio Wednesday Matinee in 1948. The Radio Times reported an unusually powerful public response, with a wave of letters pouring in to the BBC after the broadcast from listeners moved by its poignant and wholly authentic depiction of a widely shared experience. Subsequently, the story about life on 214 Squadron's RAF Stradishall base was expanded again by the author and broadcast as a Saturday Night Theatre production on 23 July 1949, and on stages across the country, arriving back in London for Battle of Britain week 1950 at Richmond Theatre.
