= Senantes, Oise =

Senantes
- Commune
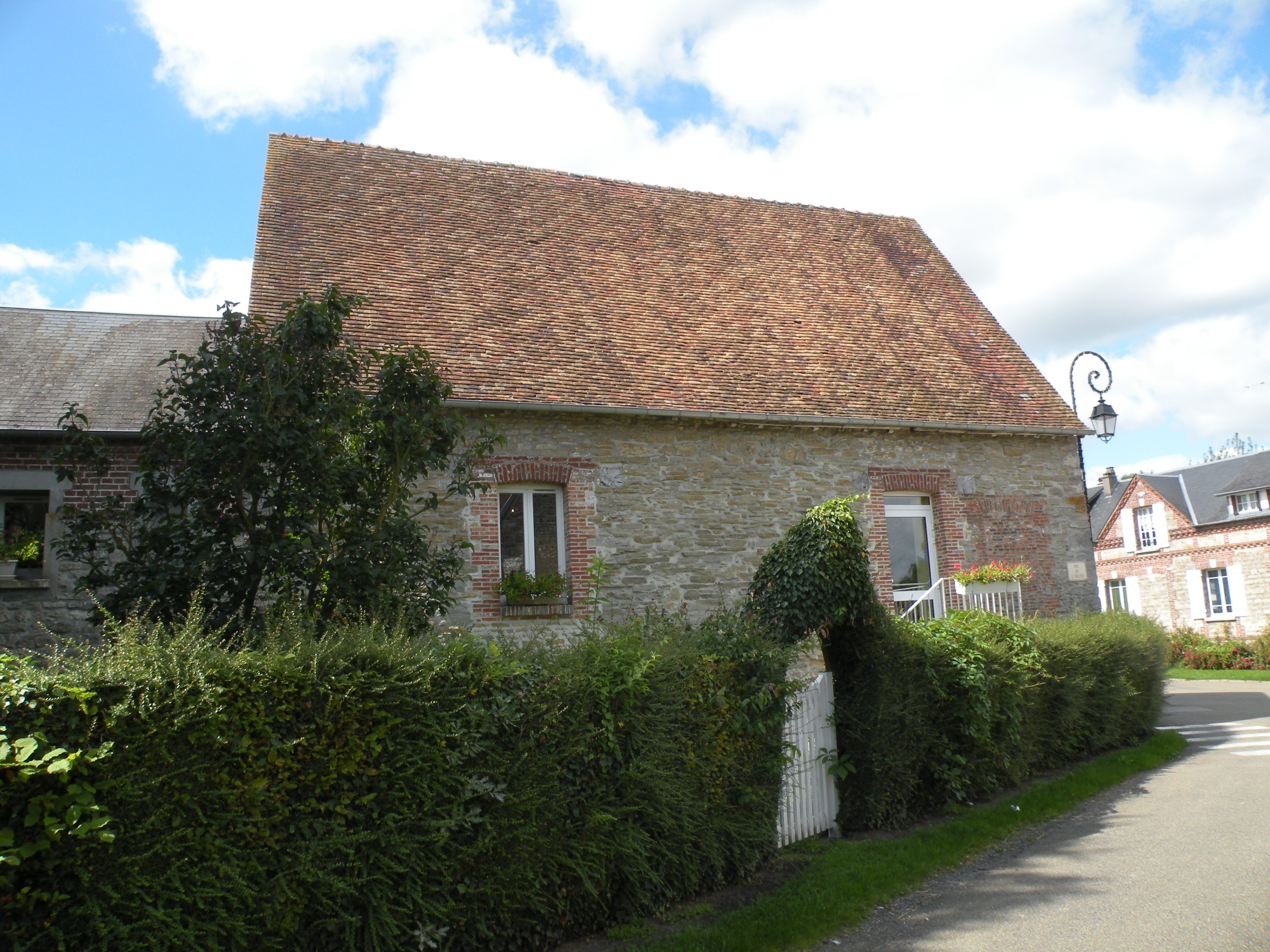
- The town hall in Senantes
- Location of Senantes
- Location within France Location within Hauts-de-France
- Coordinates: 49°29′12″N 1°50′08″E
- Country: France
- Region: Hauts-de-France
- Department: Oise
- Arrondissement: Beauvais
- Canton: Grandvilliers
- Intercommunality: Picardie Verte

Government
  - Mayor (2020–2026): Christian Gavelle
- Area^{1}: 19.94 km^{2} (7.70 sq mi)
- Elevation: 200 m (660 ft)
- Highest elevation: 218 m (715 ft)
- Lowest elevation: 93 m (305 ft)
- Population (2023): 577
  - Density: 28.9/km^{2} (74.9/sq mi)
- Time zone: UTC+01:00 (CET)
  - Summer (DST): UTC+02:00 (CEST)
- INSEE/Postal code: 60611 /60650
- ^{1} French Land Register data, which excludes lakes, ponds, glaciers > 1 km^{2} (0.386 sq mi or 247 acres) and river estuaries.

Senantes (French pronunciation: [sənɑ̃t]) is a commune in the Oise department in northern France.

== See also ==
- Communes of the Oise department
