= No. 109 Squadron RAF =

Defunct flying squadron of the Royal Air Force

- Active: 1 Nov 1917 – 19 Aug 1918; 10 Dec 1940 – 30 Sep 1945; 1 Oct 1945 – 1 Feb 1957
- Country: United Kingdom
- Branch: Royal Air Force
- Mottos: Latin: Primi hastati ("The first of the legion")

Commanders
- Notable commanders: C.C. McMullen (c. 1941)

Insignia
- Squadron badge heraldry: A panther rampant, incensed. The black panther indicates night hunting and the attitude of the animal symbolises attack
- Squadron codes: HS Dec 1940 – Apr 1945, Oct 1945 – 1951

No. 109 Squadron RAF was an aircraft squadron of the Royal Air Force.

== History ==
The squadron first formed on 1 November 1917 as 109 Squadron Royal Flying Corps at South Carlton and began training on the de Havilland DH.9 bomber but was disbanded on 19 August 1918 without becoming operational.

Reformed on 10 December 1940 from the Wireless Intelligence Development Unit at RAF Boscombe Down operating a variety of aircraft. The main task was to identify German radio beams and to develop methods to jam them, its secondary role was to develop wireless and radar navigation aids for Bomber Command. In 1942 the squadron moved to RAF Stradishall with the twin-engined de Havilland Mosquito light bomber fitted with Oboe and then, soon, to RAF Wyton where it operated as part of the Pathfinder Force. The use of Oboe was worked out using Mosquitos of 109 Squadron. After four months work the device was put into service to mark the bomb aim point against Düsseldorf on 1 January 1943. The use of Oboe equipped Mosquitos to mark targets was crucial to the success of the RAF's campaign against the Ruhr. The squadron continued performing marking duties till the end of the war, including the last raid on Berlin on 21 April 1945. As the war finished it used its accurate navigation equipment to help drop supplies in the Netherlands. The squadron was disbanded on 30 September 1945 at RAF Little Staughton it had carried out 5,421 operational sorties with the Mosquito with the loss of 18 aircraft.

On 1 October 1945 it was reformed at RAF Woodhall Spa still as a Mosquito unit and provided a light bomber force for Bomber Commander in the post-war years. It eventually re-equipped with Canberras and saw action in the Suez campaign. With the increase of the V bomber force the squadron was no longer needed and was finally disbanded on 1 February 1957 at RAF Binbrook.

== Aircraft operated ==
Aircraft and dates operated
Dates	Aircraft	Variant	Notes
1917–1918	de Havilland DH.9		Single-engined piston biplane bomber
1940–1941	Armstrong Whitworth Whitley	V	Twin-engined medium bomber
1940–1942	Avro Anson	I	Twin-engined transport and trainer
1940–1942	Vickers Wellington	I	Twin-engined medium bomber
1941–1942	Vickers Wellington	IC	
1942	Avro Lancaster	I	Four-engined heavy bomber
1942–1945	de Havilland Mosquito	IV, IX and XVI	Twin-engined light bomber
1945–1948	de Havilland Mosquito	XVI	
1948–1952	de Havilland Mosquito	B35	
1952–1954	English Electric Canberra	B2	Twin-engined jet light bomber
1954–1957	English Electric Canberra	B6	
