= No. 218 (Gold Coast) Squadron RAF =

- Active: 24 April 1918 – 24 June 1919; 16 March 1936 – 10 August 1945; 1 December 1959 – 23 August 1963
- Country: United Kingdom
- Branch: Royal Air Force
- Role: Precision Bombing
- Garrison/HQ: France, RAF Marham, RAF Downham Market
- Nicknames: Gold Coast; Weston-super-Mare’s Own Squadron
- Motto: "In Time"

Insignia
- Squadron Badge heraldry: An hourglass. The hourglass symbolises the late forming of the squadron during the 1914–18 war, the golden sand having almost run through.
- Squadron Codes: 218 Jan 1938 - Apr 1939; SV Apr–Sep 1939; HA Sep 1939 – Aug 1945; XH (only used by 'C' Flt)

No. 218 Squadron RAF was a squadron of the Royal Air Force. It was also known as No 218 (Gold Coast) Squadron after the Governor of the Gold Coast (modern Ghana) and people of the Gold Coast officially adopted the squadron. The squadron was informally known in the UK as "Weston-super-Mare’s Own."

== History ==
=== World War I ===
The squadron was first formed at Dover on 24 April 1918, going into action a month later in France. The unit flew Airco DH.9s in daylight bombing raids and during its 5 months of wartime service, it dropped 94 long tons (96 t) of bombs over enemy targets in France and Belgium, flying a total of 117 sorties. In 1919, the unit was disbanded, having claimed 37 enemy aircraft during the war.

=== World War II ===
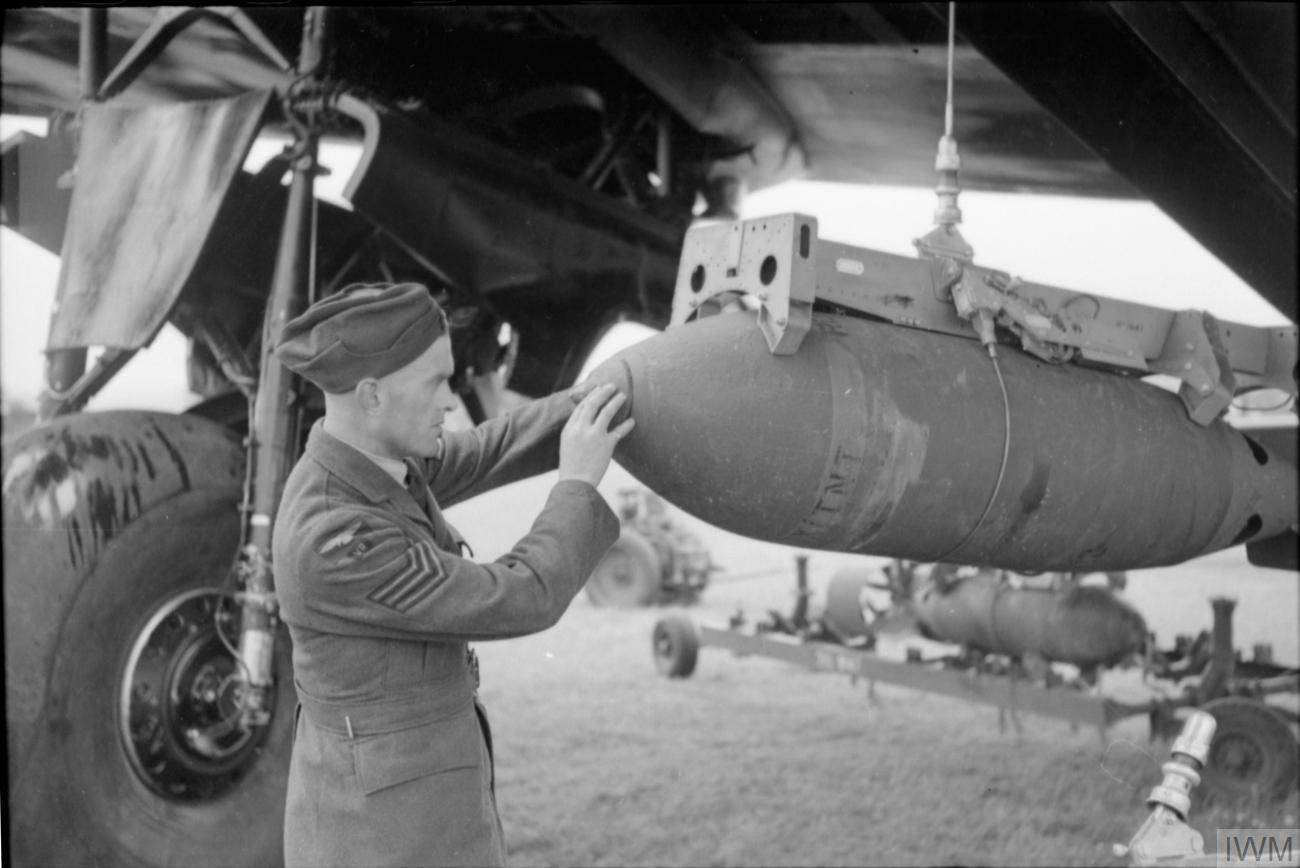
Armourer checking bomb fuzes on 218 Squadron Stirling at RAF Downham Market

The squadron was reformed on 16 March 1936 from elements of 57 Squadron at RAF Upper Heyford with the Hawker Hind and re-equipped with the Fairey Battle in 1938. On 2 September 1939, the unit moved back to France, where it began dropping leaflets and flying reconnaissance missions. By June 1940, having suffered many losses while bombing advancing German troops, the unit was evacuated to England, where it converted to the Bristol Blenheim. In November, it rearmed with Vickers Wellingtons and began bombing a wide variety of Axis targets with the new longer-range aeroplanes. In December 1941, the squadron began changing to Short Stirlings and continued its bombing raids in occupied Europe against everything from infantry columns to V-weapon sites. Missions in 1942 included Operation Canonbury 1 and 2 on the night of 24 April and 4 May to bomb the Škoda Works factory at Plzeň in Czechoslovakia, in support of the partisan group inserted to assassinate Reinhard Heydrich in Operation Anthropoid. In July 1942, the unit moved to RAF Downham Market and in March 1944 to RAF Woolfox Lodge in Rutland. In August 1944, it moved once more, this time to RAF Methwold with the Avro Lancaster.

Just before the D-Day invasions in Normandy, the Stirlings of No. 218 Squadron undertook diversionary bombing raids against Wehrmacht shore defences near Pas de Calais. No. 218 Squadron played a significant role in a diversion known as Operation Glimmer in which Window was dropped to simulate a naval fleet headed towards the French coast. The operation, which was intended to draw German forces away from the real landing sites over 100 mi (160 km) to the south-west, was so important to Operation Overlord's success that the squadron was temporarily directed by the civilian physicist Sebastian Pease of RAF Bomber Command's Operational Research Section to ensure that the deception seemed as authentic as possible

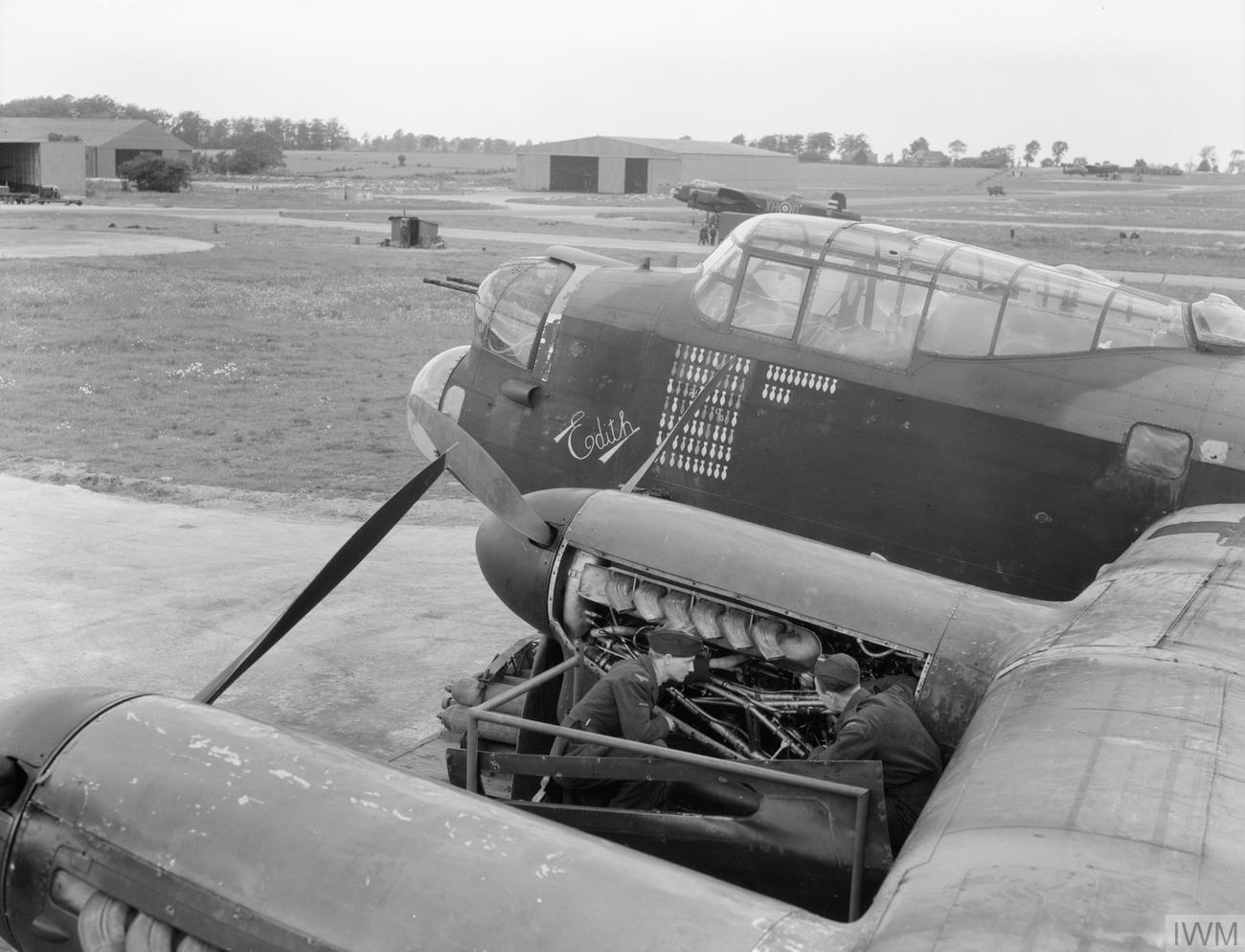
Engine work on a 218 Squadron Lancaster B Mark III at RAF Chedburgh

It is to the credit of the pilots and navigators of No. 218 Squadron that the German shore batteries actually opened fire on the "ghost" fleet that they created. The German 2nd Panzer Division and 116th Panzer Division remained at the Pas de Calais for at least two weeks after D-Day, because they believed that Pas de Calais would be the site of a major British operation. In December 1944 the squadron moved to Chedburgh as a transport unit. It ceased wartime operations in May 1945, just before the German surrender. Afterwards, it began performing a number of relief efforts in Europe, ranging from rescuing POWs to transporting food and other supplies. No. 218 Squadron's awards include a Victoria Cross awarded posthumously to Flight Sergeant Arthur Louis Aaron for "most conspicuous bravery" during a raid on Turin on 12/13 August 1943. Despite his aircraft being badly damaged and suffering injuries, he brought his aircraft in to land at Bone, Algeria (now Annaba Airfield) where he later died of his wounds. Citation at https://www.thegazette.co.uk/London/issue/36235/supplement/4859

=== Post War ===
The unit was linked to No. 115 Squadron RAF between February 1949 and March 1950 and also for the period June 1950 to June 1957. The squadron was reformed – as 218(SM) Sqn. – on 1 December 1959 as one of 20 Strategic Missile (SM) squadrons associated with Project Emily. The squadron was equipped with three Thor Intermediate range ballistic missiles, and based at RAF Harrington in Northamptonshire. In October 1962, during the Cuban Missile Crisis, the squadron was kept at full readiness, with the missiles aimed at strategic targets in the USSR. The squadron was disbanded on 23 August 1963, with the termination of the Thor Program in Britain.

== Notable pilots ==
- Karl S. Day
- Phil Lamason
- Arthur Louis Aaron
- Hank Wardle

Garfield Prior, DFC
