= RAF Little Staughton =

Former Royal Air Force station in Cambridgeshire, England

RAF Little Staughton RAF Staughton Moor USAAF Station 127 Little Staughton Airfield
- Near Little Staughton, Bedfordshire in England
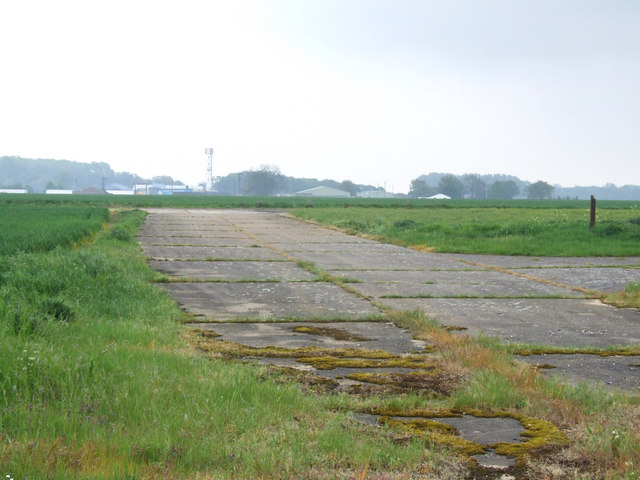
- Formerly disused WW2 runway

Site information
- Type: Royal Air Force station
- Owner: Air Ministry; now IAE Ltd
- Operator: United States Army Air Forces; Royal Air Force; United States Air Force; Currently; IAE Ltd
- Website: https://www.iae.org.uk/little%20staughton%20airfield.htm

Location
- Shown within Cambridgeshire RAF Little Staughton (the United Kingdom)
- Coordinates: 52°14′40″N 000°21′42″W

Site history
- Built: 1941; 85 years ago
- In use: 1942–1947; 2021–present
- Battles/wars: European theatre of World War II

Airfield information
- Elevation: 225 feet (69 m) AMSL
Runways
| Direction | Length and surface |
|---|---|
| 06/24 | 922 metres (3,025 ft) Asphalt |
- Sources: Pooleys Flight Guide UK (2022)

Royal Air Force Little Staughton or more simply RAF Little Staughton is a former Royal Air Force station located 1.7 miles (2.7 km) south of Great Staughton, Cambridgeshire and 4.2 miles (6.8 km) west of St Neots, Cambridgeshire, England.

== Station history ==
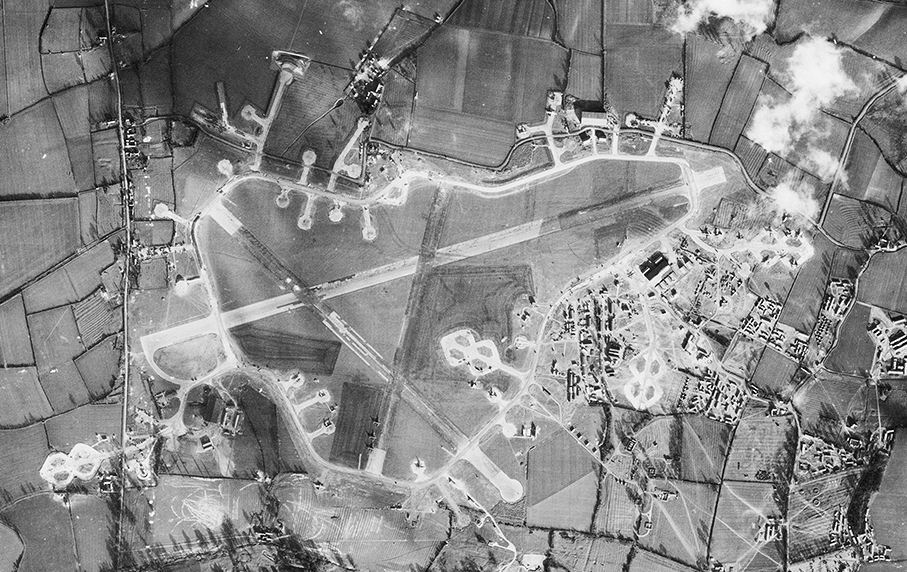
Aerial photograph of Little Staughton airfield looking north, the technical site and barrack sites are to the right, 10 February 1944.

The airfield was first handed over to the United States Army Air Forces (USAAF) in 1942.

- 1st Bomb Wing USAAF
  - 2nd Advanced Air Depot USAAF

RAF Little Staughton was returned to the Royal Air Force (RAF) on 1 March 1944

- No. 47 Group Communication Flight
- No. 48 Group Communication Flight
- No. 2731 Squadron RAF Regiment
- No. 2746 Squadron RAF Regiment
- Pathfinder Force 8 Group - No. 109 Squadron RAF from 2 April 1944 with the de Havilland Mosquito XVI before being disbanded on 30 September 1945
- Pathfinder Force 8 Group - No. 582 Squadron RAF formed at the airfield on 1 April 1944 with the Avro Lancaster I and III before being disbanded on 10 September 1945

The airfield was placed into care and maintenance in 1945, and during the 1950s the United States Air Force extended the runway for use by jet aircraft in emergency circumstances. However, in the late 1950s they moved out.

At some point the runway was shortened on the south end to the southmost taxiway with the land converted into a field.

== See also ==
- List of former Royal Air Force stations

== Current use ==
The site is mainly for farming with the hangars used for various uses. In January 2020, Little Staughton Airfield and Industrial Park applied for planning permission to develop the site to re-open the airfield. By December 2021 IAE had constructed a new hangar and re-opened half of the runway. There is also a solar farm and an industrial estate reusing the old airfield buildings.

Because of the lack of redevelopment most of the Military Buildings remain including the control tower, the Airfield battle HQ, a T2 hangar and a variety of smaller buildings, some of which are in an area called 'little america' as it was the site of the American accommodation blocks, which is to the south of the airfield
