= RAF Graveley =

Former airfield of the Royal Air Force

RAF Graveley
- Graveley, Huntingdon, Cambridgeshire in England
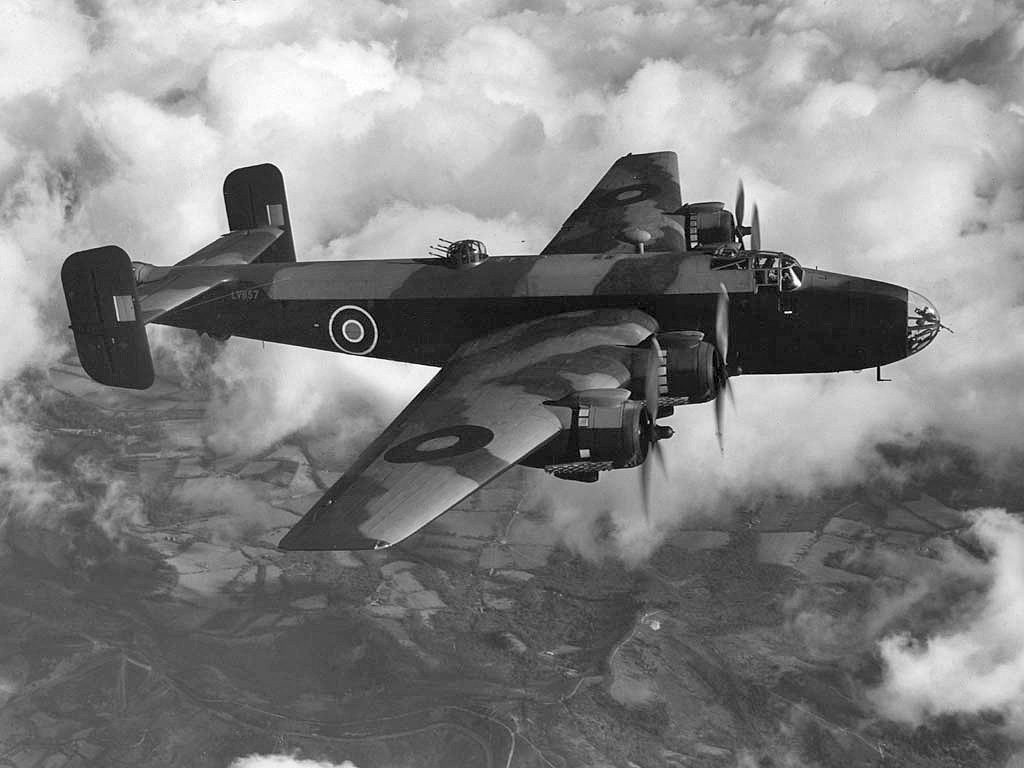
- Handley Page Halifax B.III

Site information
- Type: Royal Air Force Station
- Code: GR
- Owner: Ministry of Defence
- Operator: Royal Air Force
- Controlled by: RAF Bomber Command * No. 3 Group RAF * No. 8 (PFF) Group RAF

Location
- Shown within Cambridgeshire RAF Graveley (the United Kingdom)
- Coordinates: 52°15′47″N 000°11′24″W

Site history
- Built: 1941
- In use: March 1942 - December 1968
- Battles/wars: European theatre of World War II

Airfield information
- Elevation: 54 metres (177 ft) AMSL
Runways
Direction	Length and surface
03/21	4,200 feet (1,280 m) Concrete
09/27	6,000 feet (1,829 m) Concrete
15/33	4,200 feet (1,280 m) Concrete

Royal Air Force Graveley or more simply RAF Graveley is a former Royal Air Force station located 5 miles (8 km) south of Huntingdon. The station was originally intended to operate under No. 3 Group RAF, alongside RAF Tempsford and RAF Gransden Lodge.

== Station history ==
Work on the site started in 1941, and it was opened as an operational base in March 1942 with No. 161 Squadron flying Westland Lysander aircraft under No. 3 Group RAF, until it transferred to the Pathfinder Force with No. 35 Squadron in August 1942. Originally, the base was intended for special operations and would have operated alongside RAF Tempsford and RAF Gransden Lodge. No. 35 Sqn (No. XXXV Squadron) arrived in August 1942 using the Handley Page Halifax (which it had used since 1940) it became a pathfinder unit, forming part of No. 8 Group. The squadron's first operation from Graveley took place on the night of 18/19 August 1942, a raid on Flensburg in which the first aircraft was lost. Among the most notable figures associated with No. 35 Squadron at Graveley was Squadron Leader Alec Panton Cranswick DSO, DFC, who flew more bombing operations than any other RAF pilot in the Second World War before being killed on his 107th mission on the night of 4/5 July 1944, when his Lancaster was shot down during a raid on Villeneuve-Saint-Georges near Paris. Wing Commander B. V. Robinson, who later became Station Commander at Graveley in May 1943, survived a remarkable incident on the night of 18/19 November 1942 when his Halifax caught fire after flares ignited in the bomb bay; he ordered his crew to bail out, but the fire extinguished itself as the last man left, and Robinson flew the damaged aircraft single-handed to a crash landing at RAF Colerne, for which he was awarded a Bar to his DSO. Robinson was later killed over Germany on the night of 23/24 August 1943. The squadron was formally designated No. 35 (Madras Presidency) Squadron on 5 January 1942, in recognition of funding donated by the Madras Presidency of British India.. In March 1944 the squadron re-equipped with the Avro Lancaster and continued at Graveley until it was posted to RAF Stradishall in September 1946. During November 1945, Michael Beetham, then a Squadron Leader, was posted onto the squadron.

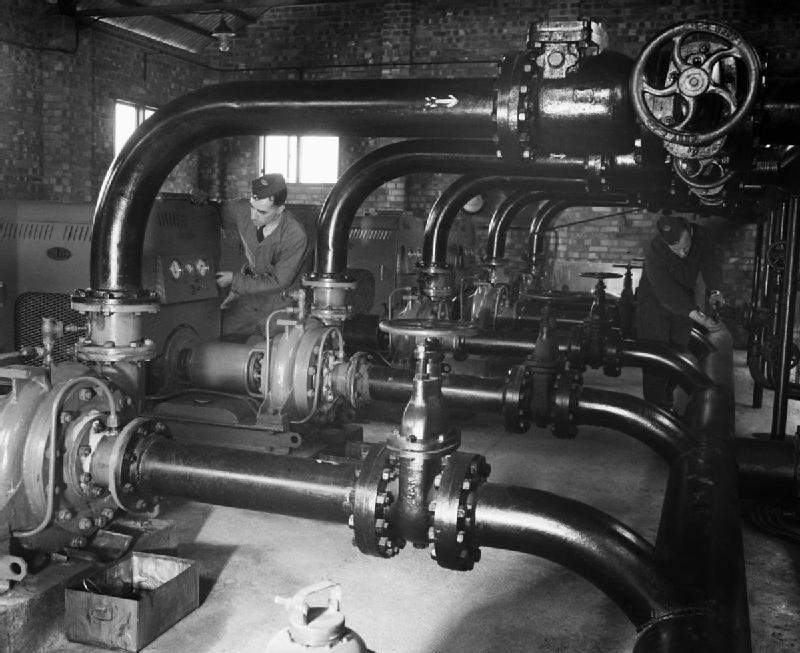
FIDO pumps at RAF Graveley

In 1943, RAF Graveley was one of the first operational stations to use the fog dispersal system FIDO. It was tested in July of that year with fog being burnt off and visibility vastly increased, though the descending aircraft had to cope with turbulence caused by the heated air from the evaporated fog. In November 1943, the first operational use of the FIDO system saw four Halifax aircraft of No. 35 Sqn landing in fog after a bombing operation.

No. 692 Squadron was formed on 1 January 1944 at RAF Graveley, equipped with de Havilland Mosquito IV bombers, as part of the Light Night Striking Force of No. 8 Group RAF in Bomber Command. It re-equipped with the Mosquito XVI bombers in March.

No. 227 Squadron moved to Graveley from Strubby in June 1945, and was disbanded here on 5 September 1945.

Post-war, the airfield was used as a relief landing ground for No. 206 Advanced Flying School and No. 5 Flying Training School which were based at RAF Oakington. The airfield was closed in December 1968.

== In popular culture ==
Part of the filming for the 1967 movie picture "'Robbery" (which was based on the Great Train Robbery) was filmed at the airfield with a number of exterior shots showing parts of the airfield. A few of the buildings shown in the film where the control tower was located still exist.

== Current use ==
The airfield is mostly agriculture with a few buildings surviving. A wind farm was built on the site in the 2010s.
