= No. 163 Squadron RAF =

Defunct flying squadron of the Royal Air Force

- Active: 1 Jun 1918 – 17 Aug 1918; 10 Jul 1942 – 16 Jun 1943; 15 Jan 1945 – 10 Aug 1945
- Country: United Kingdom
- Branch: Royal Air Force
- Motto: venture adventure

No. 163 Squadron RAF was a Royal Air Force Squadron that was a communications and light bomber unit in World War II.

== History ==
=== Formation and World War I ===
No. 163 Squadron Royal Flying Corps was formed on 1 June 1918, but it was not equipped with any aircraft and was disbanded on 17 August 1918 without becoming operational.

=== Reformation in World War II ===
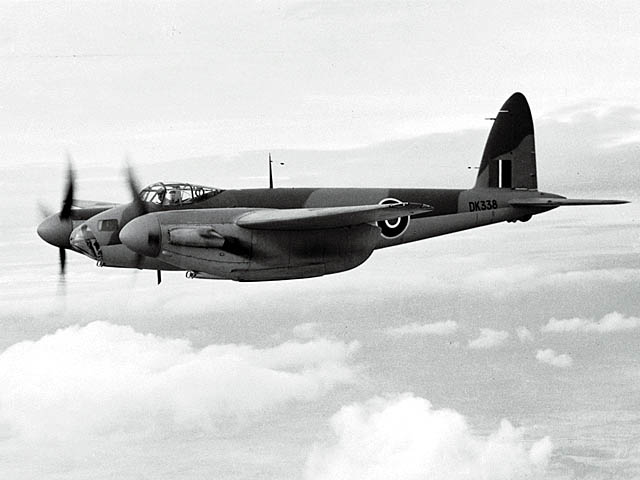
de Havilland Mosquito

The squadron reformed on 10 July 1942 at Asmara, Egypt, and equipped with Hudson aircraft that operated a mail and communications service to Khartoum, Sudan, and other African countries. It was disbanded on 16 June 1943 and reformed at RAF Wyton on 15 January 1945 as a Mosquito Squadron on operations over Germany as part of the Night Striking Force, it finally disbanded on 10 August 1945.

== Aircraft operated ==
Aircraft operated by No. 163 Squadron RAF
From	To	Aircraft	Variant
Jul 1942	Aug 1942	Lockheed Hudson	IIIA
Jul 1942	Dec 1942	Lockheed Hudson	VI
Jan 1945	Aug 1945	de Havilland Mosquito	XXV
May 1945	Aug 1945	de Havilland Mosquito	XVI
