= RAF Bomber Command =

Former command of the Royal Air Force

Bomber Command, Royal Air Force
- Bomber Command badge
- Active: 14 July 1936–1968
- Country: United Kingdom
- Allegiance: Monarch of the United Kingdom
- Branch: Royal Air Force (RAF); attached squadrons & individual personnel of the RCAF, RAAF, and RNZAF.
- Role: Strategic bombing
- Headquarters: 1936–1940: RAF Uxbridge; 1940–1968: RAF High Wycombe
- Motto: Strike Hard Strike Sure
- Engagements: Second World War
- Battle honours: Berlin 1940–1945; Fortress Europe 1940–1944

Commanders
- Notable commanders: Air Marshal Charles Portal; Air Chief Marshal Sir Arthur Harris

Aircraft flown
- Bomber: 1939: Battle, Blenheim, Hampden, Wellesley, Wellington, Whitley. 1942: Manchester, Stirling, Halifax, Lancaster, Mosquito. 1945: Lincoln 1950: Washington B.1 1951: Canberra. 1955: Vickers Valiant 1956: Avro Vulcan 1958: Handley Page Victor.

Bomber Command, Royal Air Force controlled the Royal Air Force's (RAF) bomber forces from 1936 to 1968. Along with the United States Army Air Forces, it played the central role in the strategic bombing of Germany during the Second World War. From 1942 onward, the British bombing campaign against Germany became less restrictive and increasingly targeted industrial sites and the civilian manpower base essential for German war production. In total 501,536 operational sorties were flown, 2.25 billion pounds (1.02 million tonnes) of bombs were dropped, and 8,325 aircraft lost in action. Bomber Command crews also suffered a high casualty rate: 55,573 were killed out of a total of 125,000 aircrew, a 44.4% death rate. A further 8,403 men were wounded in action, and 9,838 became prisoners of war.

Bomber Command stood at the peak of its post-war military power in the 1960s, the V bombers holding the United Kingdom's nuclear deterrent, and a supplemental force of Canberra light bombers. In 1968, it was merged with Fighter Command to form Strike Command.

A memorial in Green Park in London was unveiled by Queen Elizabeth II on 28 June 2012 to commemorate the high casualty rate among the aircrews. In April 2018, The International Bomber Command Centre was opened in Lincoln.

== Background ==
At the time of the formation of Bomber Command in 1936, Giulio Douhet's slogan "the bomber will always get through" was popular, and figures like Stanley Baldwin cited it. Until advances in radar technology in the late 1930s, this statement was effectively true. Attacking bombers could not be detected early enough to assemble fighters fast enough to prevent them reaching their targets. Some damage might be done to the bombers by anti-aircraft (AA) guns, and by fighters as the bombers returned to base, but that was not as effective as a proper defence. Consequently, the early conception of Bomber Command was as an entity that threatened the enemy with utter destruction. The Italian general Giulio Douhet, author of The Command of the Air, was of that view.

In 1936, Germany's increasing air power was feared by British government planners who commonly overestimated its size, reach and hitting power. Planners used estimates of up to 72 British deaths per tonne (2,200 lb) of bombs dropped, though this figure was grossly exaggerated. As well, the planners did not know that German bombing aircraft of the day (not quite 300 Junkers Ju 52 medium bombers) did not have the range to reach the UK with a load of bombs and return to the mainland. British air officers did nothing to correct these perceptions because they could see the usefulness of having a strong bombing arm.

== Early years of the Second World War ==
At the start of the Second World War in 1939, Bomber Command faced four problems. The first was lack of size; Bomber Command was not large enough effectively to operate as an independent strategic force. The second was rules of engagement; at the start of the war, the targets allocated to Bomber Command were not wide enough in scope. The third problem was the Command's lack of technology; specifically radio or radar derived navigational aids to allow accurate target location at night or through cloud. (In 1938, E. G. "Taffy" Bowen proposed using ASV radar for navigation, only to have Bomber Command disclaim need for it, saying the sextant was sufficient.) The fourth problem was the limited accuracy of bombing, especially from high level.

When the war began on 1 September 1939, Franklin D. Roosevelt, President of the neutral United States, issued an appeal to the major belligerents to confine their air raids to military targets. The French and British agreed to abide by the request, provided "that these same rules of warfare will be scrupulously observed by all of their opponents". British policy was to restrict bombing to military targets and infrastructure, such as ports and railways which were of military importance. While acknowledging that bombing Germany would cause civilian casualties, the British government renounced deliberate bombing of civilian property (outside combat zones) as a military tactic.

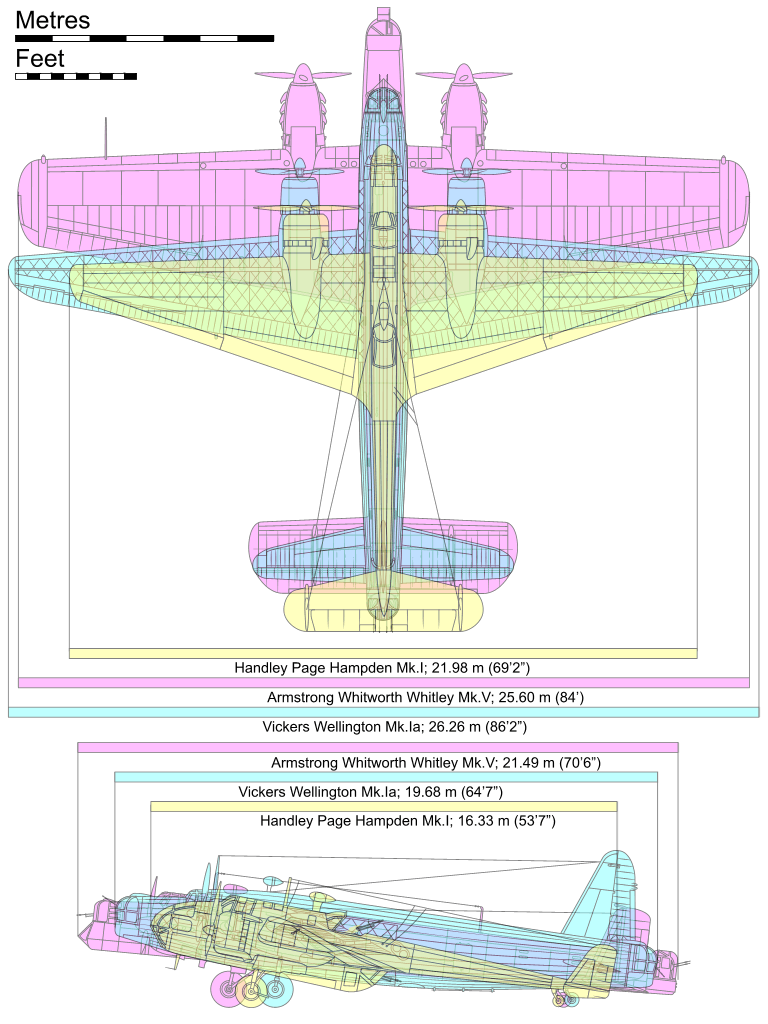
Scale comparison diagram of the trio of British twin-engined medium bombers at the outbreak of the Second World War; the A.W.38 Whitley (pink), the Vickers Wellington (blue) and the Handley Page Hampden (yellow)

The British government did not want to violate its agreement by attacking civilian targets outside combat zones and the French were even more concerned lest Bomber Command operations provoke a German bombing attack on France. Since the Armée de l'Air had few modern fighters and no defence network comparable to the British Chain Home radar stations, this left France powerless before the threat of a German bombing attack. The final problem was lack of adequate aircraft. The Bomber Command workhorses at the start of the war, the Vickers Wellington, Armstrong Whitworth Whitley and Handley Page Hampden/Hereford, had been designed as tactical-support medium bombers and none of them had enough range or ordnance capacity for anything more than a limited strategic offensive. Of these the Wellington had the longest range at 2,550 miles (4,100 km).

Bomber Command became even smaller after the declaration of war. No. 1 Group, with its squadrons of Fairey Battles, left for France to form the Advanced Air Striking Force. This action had two aims: to give the British Expeditionary Force some air-striking power and to allow the Battles to operate against German targets, since they lacked the range to do so from British airfields.

In May 1940, some of the Advanced Air Striking Force was caught on the ground by German air attacks on their airfields at the opening of the invasion of France. The remainder of the Battles proved to be horrendously vulnerable to enemy fire. Many times, Battles would set out to attack and be almost wiped out in the process. e.g. 10 May 1940 when a significant number of Battles were shot down or damaged.

Following the Rotterdam Blitz of 14 May, RAF Bomber Command was authorized to attack German targets east of the Rhine on 15 May; the Air Ministry authorized Air Marshal Charles Portal to attack targets in the Ruhr, including oil plants and other civilian industrial targets which aided the German war effort, such as blast furnaces (which were visible at night). The first attack took place on the night of 15/16 May, with 96 bombers setting off to attack targets east of the Rhine, 78 of which were against oil targets. Of these, only 24 claimed to have found their targets.

Bomber Command itself soon fully joined in the action; in the Battle of Britain, Bomber Command was assigned to bomb invasion barges and fleets assembling in the Channel ports. This was much less public than the battles of the Spitfires and Hurricanes of RAF Fighter Command but still vital and dangerous work, carried out night after night.

Bomber Command was also indirectly responsible, in part at least, for the switch of Luftwaffe attention away from Fighter Command to bombing civilian targets. A German bomber on a raid got lost due to poor navigation and bombed London. Prime Minister Winston Churchill consequently ordered a retaliatory raid on the German capital of Berlin. The damage caused was minor but the raid sent Hitler into a rage. He ordered the Luftwaffe to level British cities, thus precipitating the Blitz.

Like the United States Army Air Forces later in the war, Bomber Command had first concentrated on a doctrine of "precision" bombing in daylight. When the German defences inflicted costly defeats on British raids in late 1939, a switch to night bombing was forced upon the Command. The problems of enemy defences were then replaced with the problems of night navigation and target-finding. In the early years of the war bombers had to rely on dead reckoning navigation supported by radio fixes and astro-navigation.

== Organisation ==
Bomber Command began the war with five groups engaged in bombing operations: Nos. 1, 2, 3, 4 and 5 Groups. Initially it comprised only RAF squadrons, although as it expanded, it came to include many squadrons formed by other Commonwealth air forces (under the British Commonwealth Air Training Plan) or European countries. At the same time, many individual personnel from a wide range of Allied air forces served within RAF squadrons.

No. 1 Group was temporarily detached and sent to France to provide air cover for the BEF, but returned to the UK and Bomber Command control in 1940, after the fall of France. No. 2 Group consisted of light and medium bombers who, although operating both by day and night, remained part of Bomber Command until 1943, when it was removed to the control of Second Tactical Air Force, to form the light bomber component of that command.

Bomber Command also gained three operational groups during the war: the Pathfinder Force was expanded into No. 8 Group; No. 6 Group, Royal Canadian Air Force, and; No. 100 Group RAF, which specialised in electronic warfare. No. 8 Group, also known as the Pathfinder Force, was activated on 15 August 1942 and began operations on 8 January 1943. It was a critical part of solving the navigational and aiming problems experienced. Bomber Command solved its navigational problems using two methods. One was the use of a range of increasingly sophisticated electronic aids to navigation and the other was the use of specialist Pathfinders. The technical aids to navigation took two forms. One was external radio navigation aids, as exemplified by Gee and the later highly accurate Oboe systems. The other was the centimetric navigation equipment H2S radar carried in the bombers. The Pathfinders were a group of elite, specially trained and experienced crews who flew ahead of the main bombing forces and marked the targets with flares and special marker-bombs. No. 8 Group controlled the Pathfinder squadrons. No. 6 Group RCAF, which was activated on 1 January 1943, was unique among Bomber Command groups, in that it was a Royal Canadian Air Force (RCAF) unit attached to Bomber Command. At its peak strength, 6 Group consisted of 14 operational squadrons and a total of 15 squadrons served with the group during the war. In addition, a few other RCAF squadrons served in other, non-RCAF groups in Bomber Command. No. 100 Group RAF, formed on 11 November 1943, was responsible for development, operational trial and use of electronic warfare and countermeasures equipment).

A number of training groups were also part of the command. For example, these included, in June 1944, No. 26 Group RAF and three operational training groups: No. 91 Group RAF, Nos 92 and 93 Groups.

== Strategic bombing 1942–1945 ==
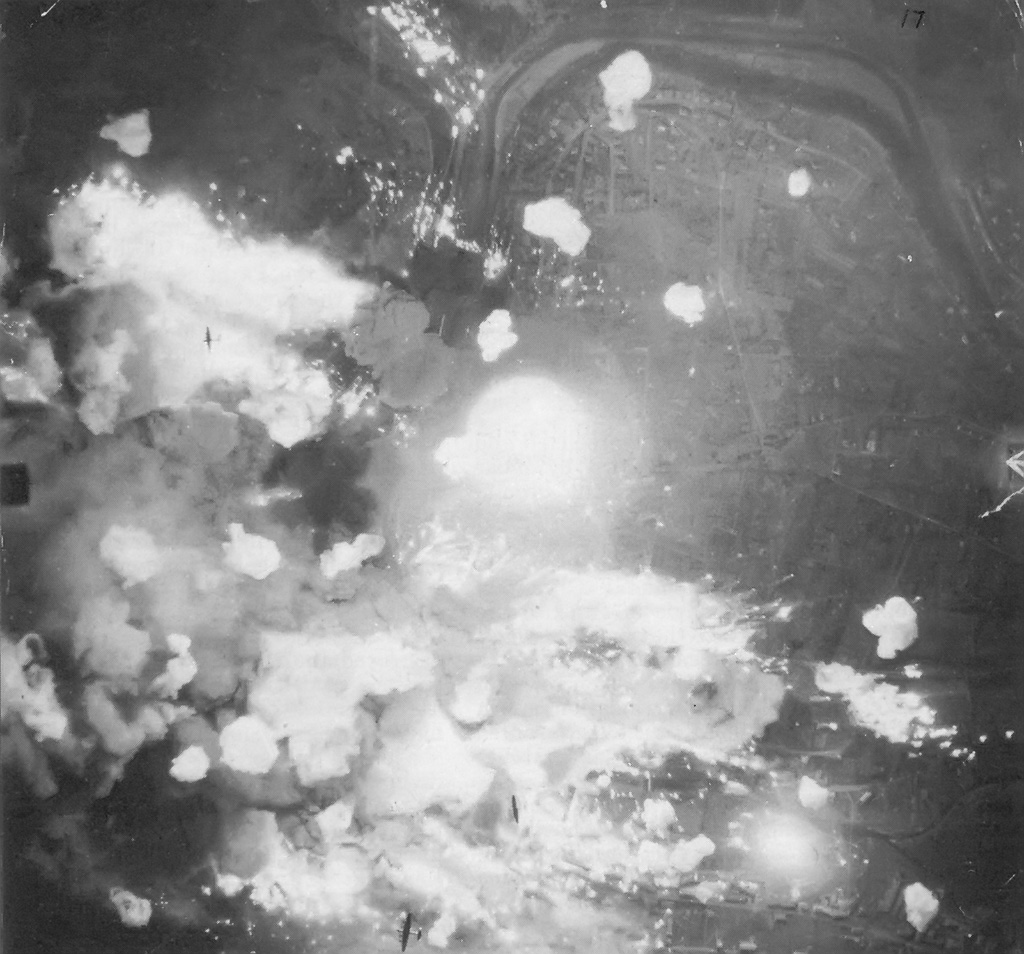
Photograph taken during a typical RAF night attack with Avro Lancasters far below

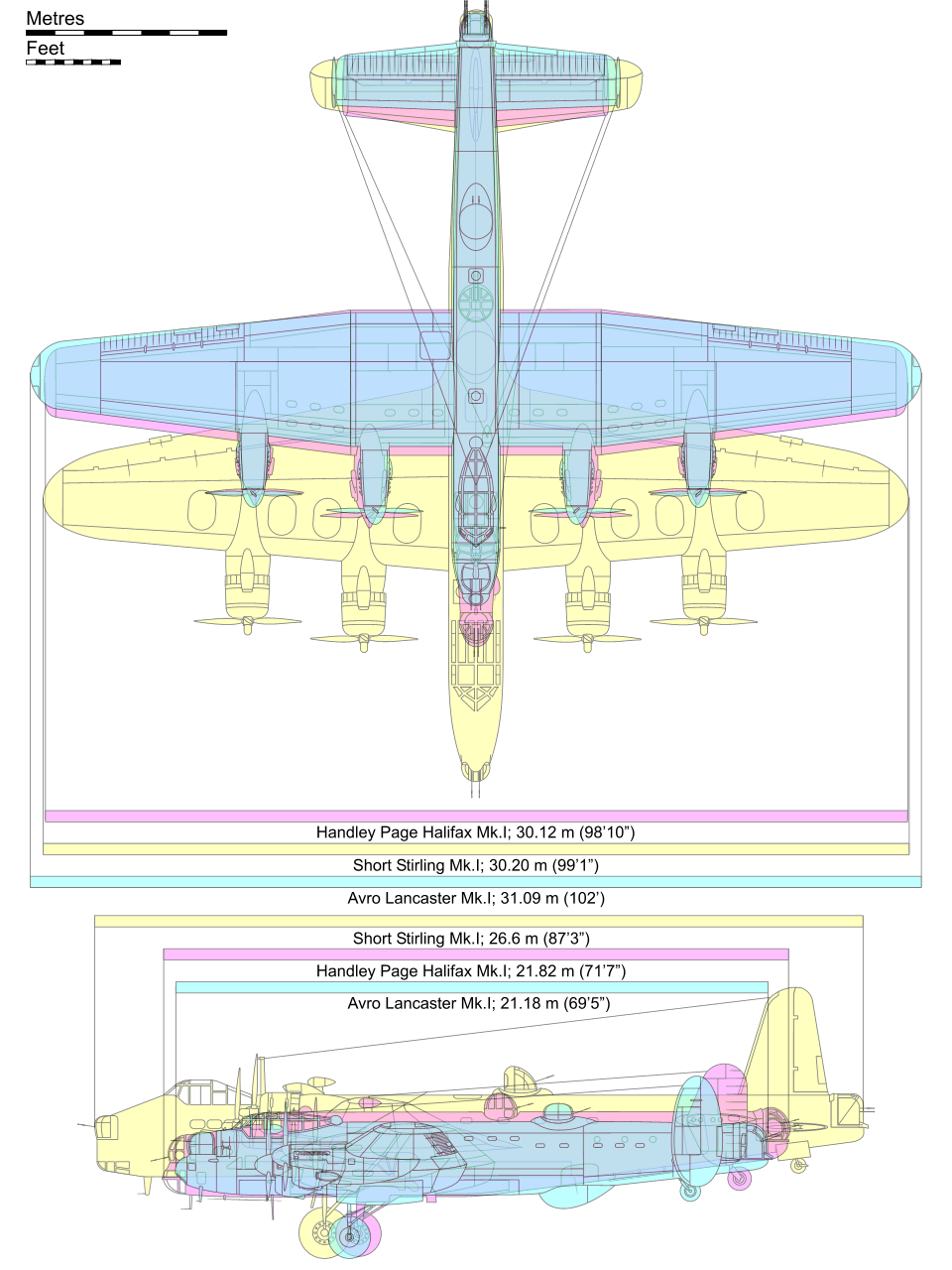
Diagram comparing the contemporary RAF four-engined heavies: the Short Stirling (yellow), the Avro Lancaster (blue) and the Handley Page Halifax (pink)

In 1941, the Butt Report revealed the extent of bombing inaccuracy: Churchill noted that "this is a very serious paper and seems to require urgent attention". The Area Bombing Directive of 14 February 1942 ordered Bomber Command to target German industrial areas and the "morale of...the industrial workers". The directive also reversed the order of the previous year instructing Bomber Command to conserve its forces; this resulted in a large campaign of area bombardment against the Ruhr area. Professor Frederick Lindemann's "de-housing" paper of March identified the expected effectiveness of attacks on residential and general industrial areas of cities. The aerial bombing of cities such as the Operation Millennium raid on Cologne continued throughout the rest of the war, culminating in the controversial bombing of Dresden in 1945.

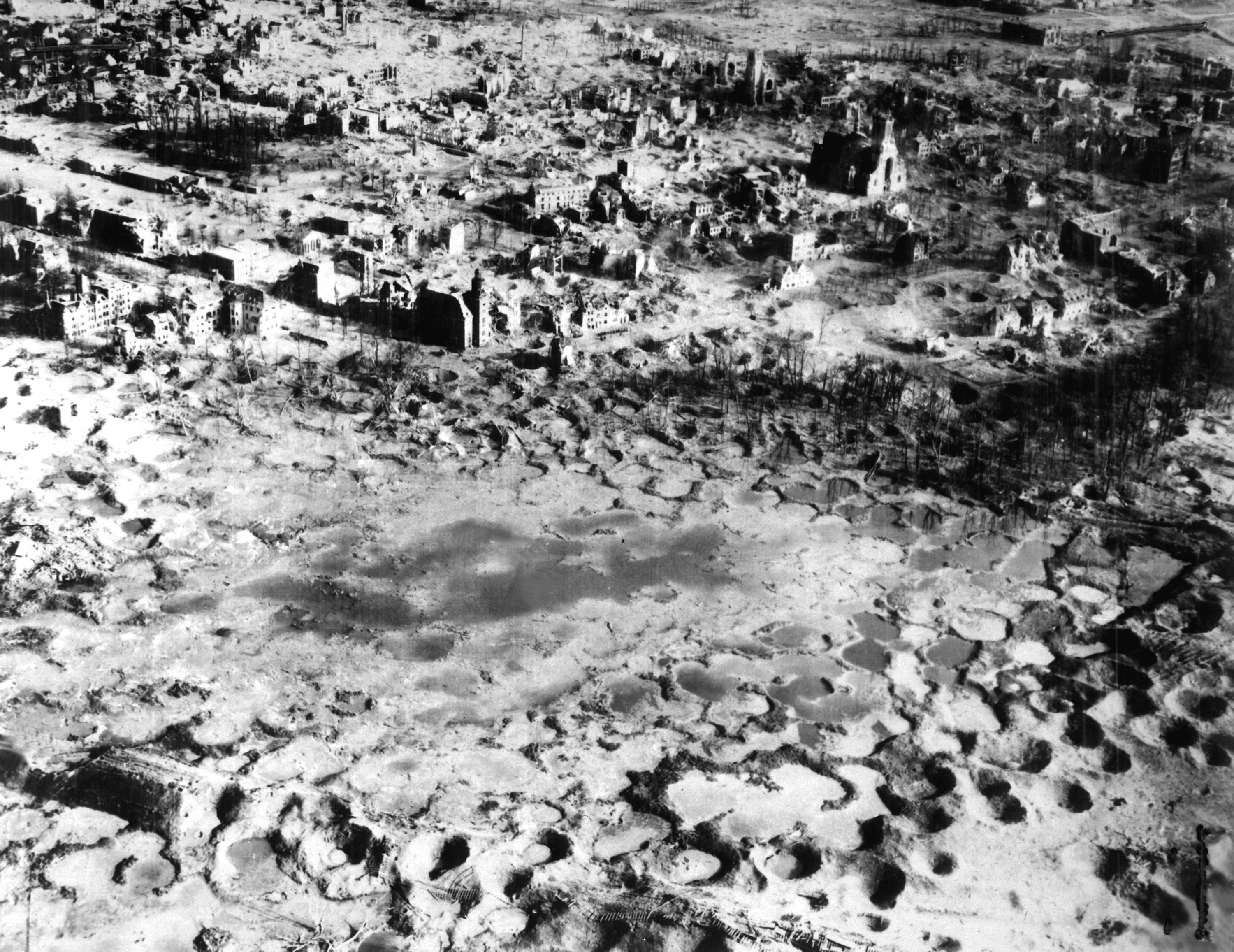
97 percent of Wesel was destroyed before it was taken by Allied troops.

In 1942, the main workhorse-aircraft of the later part of the war came into service: the four-engined heavies. The Halifax and Lancaster made up the backbone of the Command; they had a longer range, higher speed and much greater bomb load than earlier aircraft. The older four-engined Short Stirling and twin-engined Vickers Wellington bombers were not taken out of service, but moved to less demanding tasks such as mine-laying. The classic aircraft of the Pathfinders, the de Havilland Mosquito, also made its appearance. By 25 July 1943, the Bomber Command headquarters had come to occupy "a substantial set of red brick buildings, hidden in the middle of a forest on top of a hill in the English county of Buckinghamshire".

An offensive against the Rhine-Ruhr area ("Happy Valley" to aircrew) began on the night of 5/6 March 1943, with the first raid of the Battle of the Ruhr on Essen. The bombers destroyed 160 acres (65 ha) of the city and hit 53 Krupps buildings. The Battle of Hamburg in mid-1943 was one of the most successful Bomber Command operations, although Harris' extension of the offensive into the Battle of Berlin failed to destroy the capital and cost his force more than 1,000 crews in the winter of 1943–44. In August 1943, Operation Hydra, the bombing of the Peenemünde V-2 rocket facility opened the secondary Operation Crossbow campaign against long-range weapons.

By April 1944, Harris was forced to reduce his strategic offensive as the bomber force was directed (much to his annoyance) to tactical and transport targets in France in support of the invasion of Normandy. The transport offensive proved highly effective. By late 1944, bombing such as Operation Hurricane (to demonstrate the capabilities of the combined British and US bomber forces), competed against the German defences. Bomber Command was now capable of putting 1,000 aircraft over a target without extraordinary efforts. Within 24 hours of Operation Hurricane, the RAF dropped about 22 million pounds (10,000 tonnes) of bombs on Duisburg and Brunswick, the greatest bomb load dropped in a day during the Second World War.

Wesel in the Rhineland, bombed on 16, 17, 18 and 19 February, was bombed again on 23 March, leaving the city "97 percent destroyed". The last raid on Berlin took place on the night of 21/22 April, when 76 Mosquitos made six attacks just before Soviet forces entered the city centre. By this point, most RAF bombing operations were for the purpose of providing tactical support. The last major strategic raid was the destruction of the oil refinery at Vallø (Tønsberg) in southern Norway by 107 Lancasters, on the night of 25/26 April 1945.

Once the surrender of Germany had occurred, plans were made to send a "Very Long Range Bomber Force" known as Tiger Force to participate in the Pacific war against Japan. Made up of about 30 British Commonwealth heavy bomber squadrons, a reduction of the original plan of about 1,000 aircraft, the British bombing component was intended to be based on Okinawa. Bomber Command groups were re-organised for Operation Downfall but the Soviet invasion of Manchuria and the Bombing of Hiroshima and Nagasaki occurred before the force had been transferred to the Pacific.

In Europe Bomber Command's final operation was to fly released Allied prisoners of war home to Britain in Operation Exodus.

== Casualties ==
Bomber Command crews suffered an extremely high casualty rate: 55,573 killed out of a total of 125,000 aircrew (a 44.4 per cent death rate), a further 8,403 were wounded in action and 9,838 became prisoners of war. This covered all Bomber Command operations.

A Bomber Command crew member had a worse chance of survival than an infantry officer in World War I; more people were killed serving in Bomber Command than in the Blitz, or the bombings of Hamburg or Dresden. By comparison, the US Eighth Air Force, which flew daylight raids over Europe, had 350,000 aircrew during the war and suffered 26,000 killed and 23,000 POWs. Of the RAF Bomber Command personnel killed during the war, 72 per cent were British, 18 per cent were Canadian, 7 per cent were Australian and 3 per cent were New Zealanders.

Taking an example of 100 airmen:

- 55 killed on operations or died as a result of wounds
- three injured (in varying levels of severity) on operations or active service
- 12 taken prisoner of war (some wounded)
- two shot down and evaded capture
- 27 survived a tour of operations

In total 501,536 operational sorties were flown, 2.25 billion pounds (1.02 million tonnes) of bombs were dropped and 8,325 aircraft lost in action.

Harris was advised by an Operational Research Section (ORS-BC) under a civilian, Basil Dickins, supported by a small team of mathematicians and scientists. ORS-BC (under Reuben Smeed) was concerned with analysing bomber losses. They were able to influence operations by identifying successful defensive tactics and equipment, though some of their more controversial advice (such as removing ineffectual turrets from bombers to increase speed) was ignored.

The very high casualties suffered give testimony to the dedication and courage of Bomber Command aircrew in carrying out their orders. The overall loss rate for Bomber Command operations was 2.2 per cent, but loss rates over Germany were significantly higher; from November 1943 – March 1944, losses averaged 5.1 per cent. The highest loss rate (11.8 per cent) was incurred on the Nuremberg raid (30 March 1944). The disparity in loss rates was reflected in that, at times, Bomber Command considered making sorties over France only count as a third of an op towards the "tour" total and crews derisively referred to officers who only chose to fly on the less dangerous ops to France as "François". The loss rates excluded aircraft crashing in the UK on return, even if the machine was a write-off and there were crew casualties, which amounted to at least another 15 percent. Losses in training were significant and some courses lost 25 per cent of their intake before graduation; 5,327 men were killed in training from 1939 to 1945.

RAF Bomber Command had 19 Victoria Cross recipients. (Note: Seven of the VCs were to members of Dominion air forces and nine were posthumous. Two personnel from the same aircrew received the VC as a result of their actions on 12 May 1940. With the Germans breaking through, 12 Squadron, flying obsolete Fairey Battles, was ordered to attack two bridges on the Albert Canal near Maastricht. The whole squadron volunteered and five aircraft, all that were available, took off. Four Battles were shot down by flak and German fighters, while the fifth staggered back to base heavily damaged. One of the four shot down was piloted by Flying Officer Donald Garland, who dived from 6,000 feet (1,800 m) in the face of intense fire, and succeeded in destroying one of the bridges. He and his observer, Sgt Tom Gray, both received the posthumous award of the Victoria Cross.)

== Effectiveness of operations ==
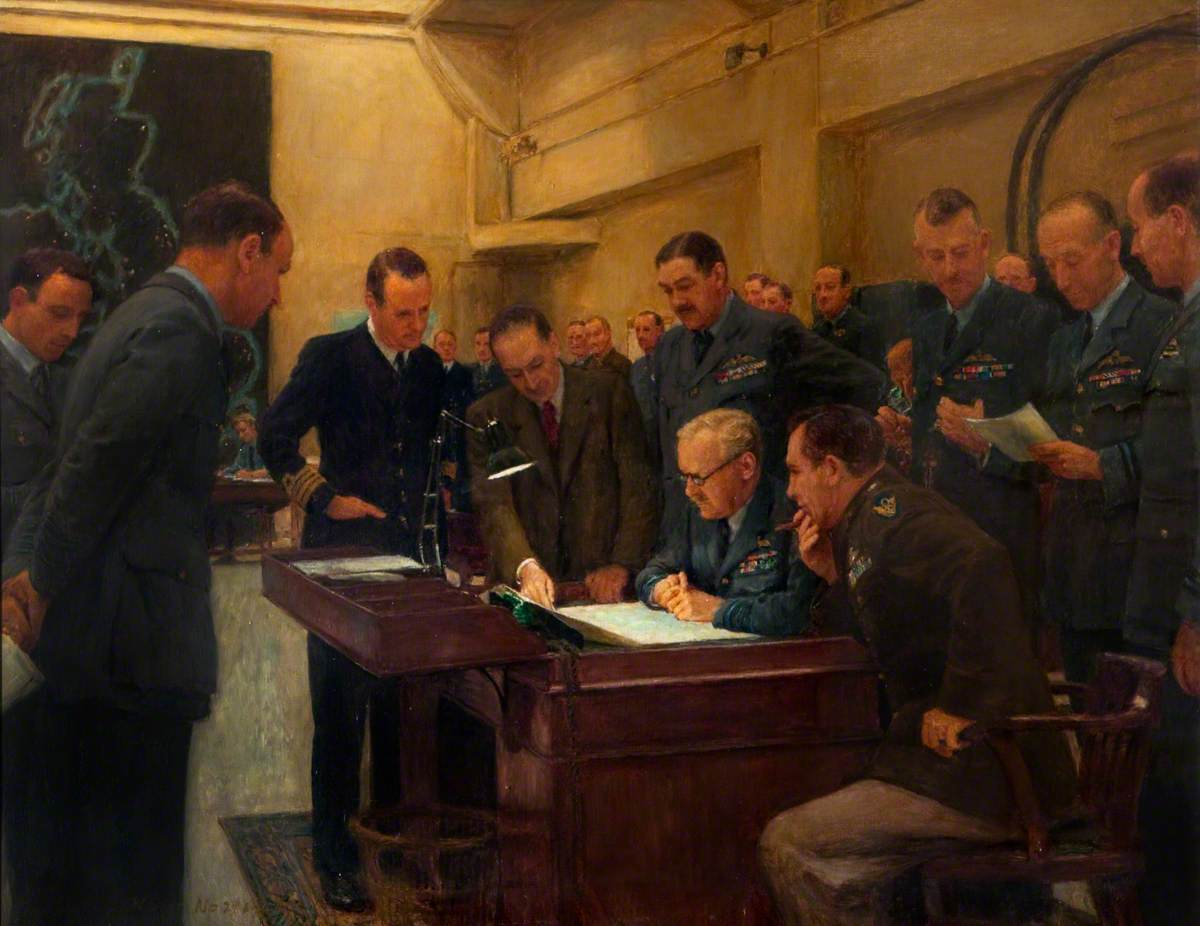
Operations Room Conference, Bomber Command, October 1943

Albert Speer, Hitler's Minister of Armaments, noted that the larger British bombs were highly destructive. 15 years after the war's end, Speer was unequivocal about the effect,

The real importance of the air war consisted in the fact that it opened a second front long before the invasion in Europe ... Defence against air attacks required the production of thousands of anti-aircraft guns, the stockpiling of tremendous quantities of ammunition all over the country, and holding in readiness hundreds of thousands of soldiers, who in addition had to stay in position by their guns, often totally inactive, for months at a time ... No one has yet seen that this was the greatest lost battle on the German side.

— Albert Speer (1959)

In terms of production decrease resulting from the RAF area attacks, the US survey, based upon limited research, found that in 1943 it amounted to 9 per cent and in 1944 to 17 per cent. Relying on US gathered statistics, the British survey found that actual arms production decreases were a mere 3 per cent for 1943, and 1 per cent for 1944. However they did find decreases of 46.5 per cent and 39 per cent in the second half of 1943 and 1944 respectively in the metal processing industries. These losses resulted from the devastating series of raids the Command launched on the Ruhr Valley. A contrasting view was offered by Adam Tooze that by referring to contemporary sources rather than post-war accounts:

there can be no doubt that the Battle of the Ruhr marked a turning point in the history of the German war economy ....

and that in the first quarter of 1943 steel production fell by 448 million pounds (203,209 tonnes), leading to cuts in the German ammunition production programme and a sub-components crisis (Zulieferungskrise). German aircraft output did not increase between July 1943 and March 1944:

Bomber command had stopped Speer's armaments miracle in its tracks.

The greatest contribution to winning the war made by Bomber Command was in the huge diversion of German resources into defending the homeland. By January 1943 some 1,000 Luftwaffe night fighters were committed to the defence of the Reich; mostly twin engined Messerschmitt Bf 110 and Junkers Ju 88. Most critically, by September 1943, 8,876 of the deadly, dual purpose 88 mm guns were also defending the homeland with a further 25,000 light flak guns, 20/37 mm. Though the 88 mm gun was an effective AA weapon, it was also a deadly destroyer of tanks, and lethal against advancing infantry. These weapons would have done much to augment German anti-tank defences on the Russian front.

Mine laying operations were a major contribution to the disruption of German naval activities. Aerial minelaying was used on the iron ore routes from Scandinavia and U-boat training areas in the Baltic; in North-West Europe aerial mines sank seven times more ships than naval mines laid from ships.

In operations Bomber Command laid 47,278 mines while losing 468 aircraft; Coastal Command contribution was 936 mines. Bomber Command and Coastal Command minelaying is credited with the loss of 759 vessels totalling 1.62 billion pounds (0.73 million tonnes).

German production was diverted into construction and manning of minesweepers and the deployment of flak batteries to protect ports and estuaries. Around 100 vessels, mostly cargo types and around 11 million pounds (5,080 tonnes), were converted to Sperrbrecher mine barrage breakers to sail ahead of ships leaving harbour and of these about half of were lost to mines.

== 1946–1968 ==
Bomber Command acquired B-29 Superfortresses, known to the RAF as Boeing Washingtons, to supplement the Avro Lincoln, a development of the Lancaster. The first jet bomber, the English Electric Canberra light bomber, became operational in 1951. Some Canberras remained in RAF service up to 2006 as photo-reconnaissance aircraft. The model proved an extremely successful aircraft; Britain exported it to many countries and licensed it for construction in Australia and the United States. The joint US-UK Project E was intended to make nuclear weapons available to Bomber Command in an emergency, with the Canberras the first aircraft to benefit. The next jet bomber to enter service was the Vickers Valiant in 1955, the first of the V bombers.

The Air Ministry conceived of the V bombers as the replacement for the wartime Lancasters and Halifaxes. Three advanced aircraft were developed from 1946, along with the Short Sperrin fall-back design. Multiple designs were tried out because no one could predict which designs would be successful at the time. The V bombers became the backbone of the British nuclear forces and comprised the Valiant, Handley Page Victor (in service in 1958) and Avro Vulcan (1956).

In 1956 Bomber Command faced its first operational test since the Second World War. The Egyptian Government nationalised the Suez Canal in July 1956, and British troops took part in an invasion along with French and Israeli forces. During the Suez Crisis, Britain deployed Bomber Command Canberras to Cyprus and Malta and Valiants to Malta. The Canberra performed well but the Valiant had problems, since it had only just been introduced into service. The Canberras proved vulnerable to attack by the Egyptian Air Force, which fortunately did not choose to attack the crowded airfields of Cyprus (RAF Akrotiri and RAF Nicosia holding nearly the whole RAF strike force, with a recently reactivated and poor-quality airfield taking much of the French force). Bomber Command aircraft took part in operations against Egypt.

Between 1959 and 1963, in addition to crewed aircraft, Bomber Command also gained 60 Thor nuclear intermediate-range ballistic missiles dispersed to 20 RAF stations around Britain in a joint UK-US operation known as Project Emily. During the following twelve years, Bomber Command aircraft frequently deployed overseas to the Far East and Middle East. They served particularly as a deterrent to Sukarno's Indonesia during the Konfrontasi. A detachment of Canberras had a permanent base at Akrotiri in Cyprus in support of CENTO obligations.

Britain tested its first atomic bomb in 1952 and exploded its first hydrogen bomb in 1957. Operation Grapple saw Valiant bombers testing the dropping of hydrogen bombs over Christmas Island. Advances in electronic countermeasures were also applied to the V bombers over the same period and the remaining V bombers came into service in the late 1950s. During the Cuban Missile Crisis of October 1962, Bomber Command aircraft maintained continuous strip alerts, ready to take off at a moment's notice, and the Thor missiles were maintained at advanced readiness.

By the early 1960s doubts emerged about the ability of Bomber Command to pierce the defences of the Soviet Union. The shooting down of a U-2 spyplane in 1960 confirmed that the Soviet Union did have surface-to-air missiles capable of reaching the heights at which bombers operated. Since the Second World War the philosophy of bombing had involved going higher and faster. With the supersession of high and fast tactics, ultra-low-level attack was substituted. Bomber Command aircraft had not been designed for that kind of attack, and airframe fatigue increased. All Valiants were grounded in October 1964 and permanently withdrawn from service in January 1965.

Bomber Command's other main function was to provide tanker aircraft to the RAF. The Valiant was the first bomber used as a tanker operationally. As high-level penetration declined as an attack technique, the Valiant saw more and more use as a tanker until the retirement of the type in 1965 due to the costs of remediating metal fatigue. With the Victor also unsuited to the low-level role six were converted to tankers to replace the Valiants, before the later conversion of the majority of Victors to tankers. The Vulcan also saw service as a tanker, and was used to bomb the main runway at Port Stanley Airport during the Falklands War.

In a further attempt to make the operation of the bomber force safer, attempts were made to develop stand-off weapons, with which capability the bombers would not have to penetrate Soviet airspace. However, efforts to do so had only limited success. The first attempt involved the Blue Steel missile (in service: 1963–1970). It worked, but its range meant that bombers still had to enter Soviet airspace. Longer-range systems were developed, but failed and/or were cancelled. This fate befell the Mark 2 of the Blue Steel, its replacement, the American Skybolt ALBM and the ground-based Blue Streak programme, which was cancelled in 1960.

RAF Fighter Command and Bomber Command merged in 1968 to form Strike Command. RAF Coastal Command followed in November 1969.

== Air Officer Commanding-in-Chief ==
At any one time several air officers served on the staff of Bomber Command and so the overall commander was known as the Air Officer Commanding-in-Chief, the most well-known being Air Chief Marshal Sir Arthur Harris. The Air Officer Commanding-in-Chief are listed below with the rank which they held whilst in post.

No.	Picture	Commanding-in-chief	Took office	Left office	Time in office
1	Sir John Steel	Air Chief Marshal; Sir John Steel (1877–1965)	14 July 1936	12 September 1937	1 year, 60 days
2	Sir Edgar Ludlow-Hewitt	Air Chief Marshal; Sir Edgar Ludlow-Hewitt (1886–1973)	12 September 1937	3 April 1940	2 years, 204 days
3	Sir Charles Portal	Air Marshal; Sir Charles Portal (1893–1971)	3 April 1940	5 October 1940	185 days
4	Sir Richard Peirse	Air Marshal; Sir Richard Peirse (1892–1970)	5 October 1940	8 January 1942	1 year, 95 days
–	Jack Baldwin	Air Vice Marshal; Jack Baldwin (1892–1975); Acting	8 January 1942	22 February 1942	45 days
5	Sir Arthur Harris	Air Chief Marshal; Sir Arthur Harris (1892–1984)	22 February 1942	15 September 1945	3 years, 205 days
6	Sir Norman Bottomley	Air Marshal; Sir Norman Bottomley (1891–1970)	15 September 1945	16 January 1947	1 year, 123 days
7	Sir Hugh Saunders	Air Marshal; Sir Hugh Saunders (1894–1987)	16 January 1947	8 October 1947	265 days
8	Sir Aubrey Ellwood	Air Marshal; Sir Aubrey Ellwood (1897–1992)	8 October 1947	2 February 1950	2 years, 117 days
9	Sir Hugh Lloyd	Air Marshal; Sir Hugh Lloyd (1894–1981)	2 February 1950	9 April 1953	3 years, 66 days
10	Sir George Mills	Air Marshal; Sir George Mills (1902–1971)	9 April 1953	22 January 1956	2 years, 288 days
11	Sir Harry Broadhurst	Air Marshal; Sir Harry Broadhurst (1905–1995)	22 January 1956	20 May 1959	3 years, 118 days
12	Sir Kenneth Cross	Air Marshal; Sir Kenneth Cross (1911–2003)	20 May 1959	1 September 1963	4 years, 104 days
13	Sir John Grandy	Air Marshal; Sir John Grandy (1913–2004)	1 September 1963	19 February 1965	1 year, 171 days
14	Sir Wallace Kyle	Air Marshal; Sir Wallace Kyle (1910–1988)	19 February 1965	30 April 1968	3 years, 71 days

== Battle honours ==
- "Berlin 1940–1945": For bombardment of Berlin by aircraft of Bomber Command.
- "Fortress Europe 1940–1944": For operations by aircraft based in the British Isles against targets in Germany, Italy and enemy-occupied Europe, from the fall of France to the invasion of Normandy.

== Memorials ==
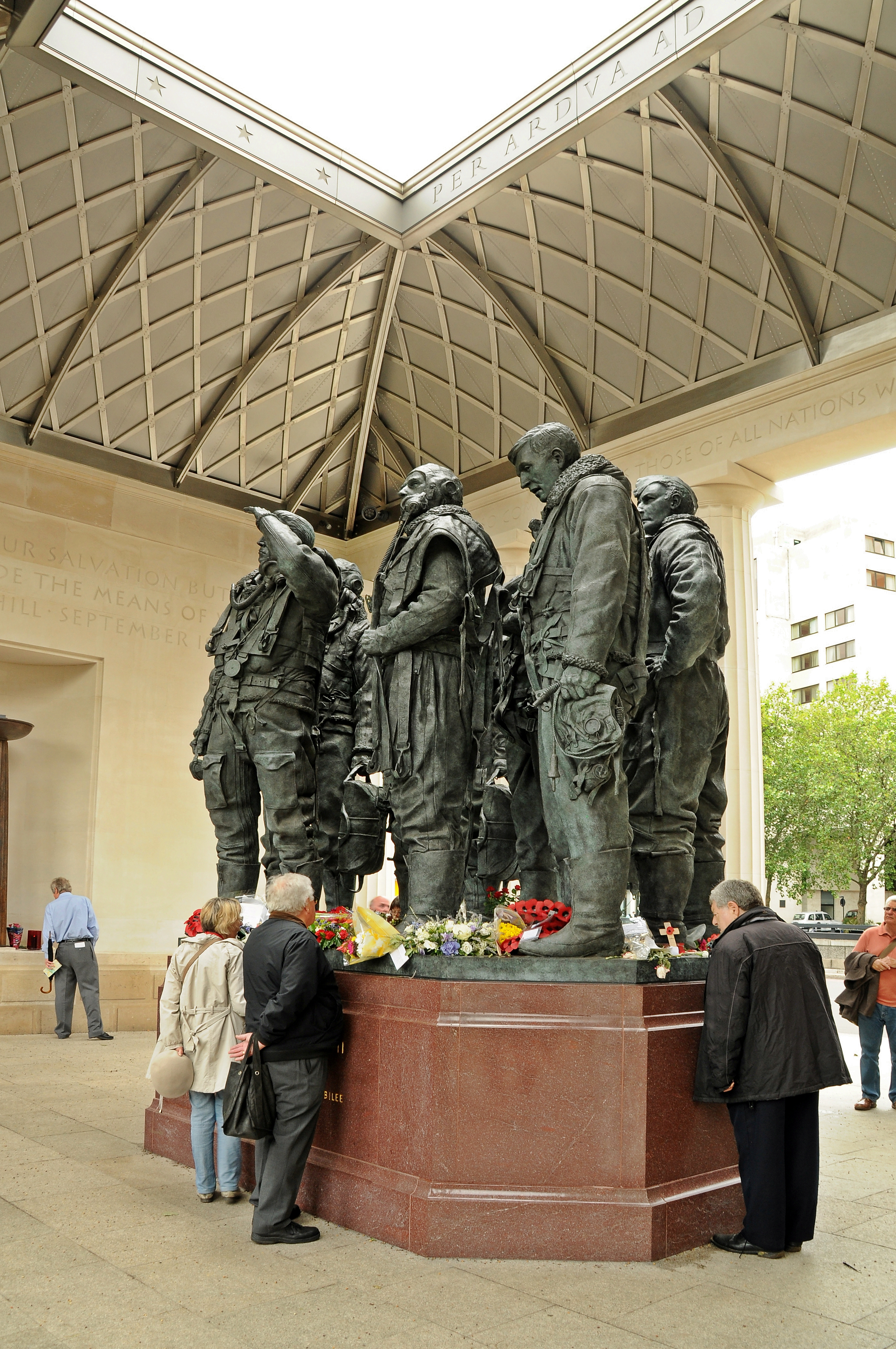
The interior of the Bomber Command Memorial in London

Singer Robin Gibb led an effort to commemorate those who died during World War II and in April, 2011, it was announced that the £5.6 million needed to build the memorial had been raised. The foundation stone of the Bomber Command Memorial for the crews of Bomber Command was laid in Green Park, London on 4 May 2011.

The memorial was designed by architect Liam O'Connor, who was also responsible for the design and construction of the Commonwealth Memorial Gates on Constitution Hill, near Buckingham Palace. Sculptor Philip Jackson created the large bronze sculpture which stands within the memorial. It consists of seven figures 9 feet (3 m) tall, and represents the aircrew of a Bomber Command heavy bomber. Jackson described the sculpture as capturing "the moment when they get off the aircraft and they've dumped all their heavy kit onto the ground". The memorial was dedicated and unveiled on 28 June 2012 by Queen Elizabeth II.

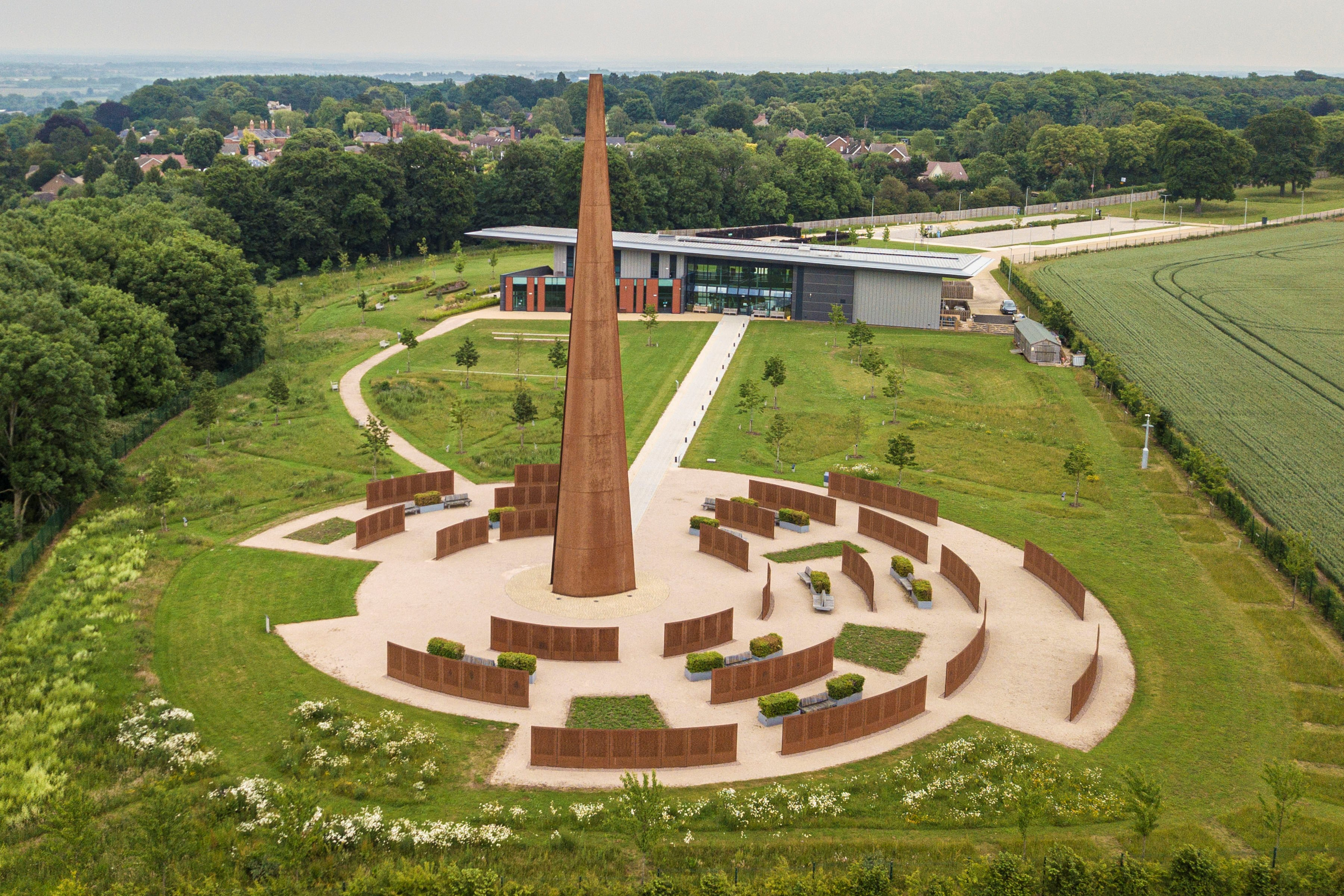
Aerial view of the Chadwick Centre, Memorial Spire and Walls

In August 2006, a memorial was unveiled at Lincoln Cathedral.

The International Bomber Command Centre (IBCC) is a memorial and interpretation centre telling the story of Bomber Command. The centre was opened to the public at the end of January 2018, and the official opening ceremony was held on 12 April 2018, as part of the 100th anniversary celebrations of the RAF. The memorial itself consists of a Memorial Spire and an array of walls listing the names of the 57,861 personnel who died in Bomber Command in the Second World War.

== Medal clasp and proposed medal ==
The planned campaign medal for Bomber Command was never struck. The decision not to award a medal for all members of Bomber Command occurred during the short gap between the wartime coalition and Attlee's Labour Government, whilst Churchill was still P.M. This caused Harris to turn down Attlee's subsequent offer of a peerage in protest at this snub; a principled stand which Harris had taken, and declared, at the time the decision not to award a separate campaign medal was made. The Command's raids had tied up huge amounts of Germany's defensive resources - which might have been diverted to the Eastern and Western Fronts and elsewhere - and the physical destruction of war material was considerable. Nevertheless, Churchill, much to Harris's chagrin, made virtually no mention of Bomber Command's campaign in his victory speech on V.E.day. Harris, who was promoted to Marshal of the RAF by the Labour Government in 1946, was persuaded to accept a baronetcy when Winston Churchill became prime minister again in 1951, after Attlee's Labour Government was voted out of office. As of 2018, the battle for a campaign medal continues.

Bomber Command clasp on the 1939–1945 Star ribbon

The Military Medals Review was undertaken by Sir John Holmes and published in July 2012. In December 2012, following the review, the British government announced the introduction of a "Bomber Command" clasp to be worn on the 1939–1945 Star. The second such clasp after the "Battle of Britain" which had been instituted in 1945. A clasp rather than a separate medal was preferred because recipients would have already received either the Air Crew Europe Star or the France and Germany Star, and a specific medal would have resulted in “double-medalling”. It is a long-standing principle of the British honours system that "same individual should not be able to receive two campaign medals for the same element of military service"; i.e. double-medalling. The eligibility for the "Bomber Command" clasp is as follows: having already qualified for the 1939–1945 Star, the individual must have served for at least sixty days or one complete tour of operations on a Bomber Command unit and flew at least one operational sortie on a Bomber Command operational unit from the 3 September 1939 to the 8 May 1945 inclusive.

== See also ==
- 112 Signals Unit Stornoway
- G for George
- International Bomber Command Centre
- RAF Bomber Command aircrew of World War II
- Target for Tonight
- Bombers Fly East
- List of Royal Air Force commands

Preceded by Wessex Bombing Area	Bomber Command; 1936–1968	Succeeded by Strike Command
