= Andrew McPherson (RAF officer) =

RAF officer

- Born: 1918; Glasgow, Scotland
- Died: 12 May 1940 (aged 22); Lanaken, Belgium
- Burial place: Heverlee Commonwealth War Graves Commission Cemetery
- Relatives: Janet Elizabeth Macgregor (sister)
- Military career
- Allegiance: United Kingdom
- Branch: Royal Air Force
- Service years: 1936–1940
- Rank: Flying Officer
- Service number: 39200
- Unit: No. 139 Squadron RAF
- Conflicts: Second World War: European theatre; Battle of the Heligoland Bight; France and Low Countries campaign; Battle of Belgium †
- Awards: Distinguished Flying Cross

Flying Officer Andrew McPherson, DFC (1918 – 12 May 1940) was a pilot with RAF Bomber Command in during the Second World War.

== Early life ==
McPherson was born in Glasgow, Scotland, to Andrew and Jean McPherson. His father had served as a captain in the Highland Light Infantry during the First World War and was a recipient of the Distinguished Service Order. The younger McPherson was educated at The Glasgow Academy.

McPherson's sister, Janet Elizabeth Macgregor, pioneered cervical cancer screening trials in the United Kingdom.

== Second World War ==
McPherson is notable for being the pilot of Bristol Blenheim bomber N6125 of No. 139 Squadron RAF, which was the first British aircraft to cross the German coast after Britain had declared war on Germany. His mission on 3 September 1939 was to look for potential targets in North Germany and the German fleet on the Schillig Roads near the port of Wilhelmshaven from an altitude of 24,000 feet. He took off from RAF Wyton in cold, cloudy weather and experienced severe icing on the aircraft. Amongst the ships he and his crew observed were the German cruisers Admiral Scheer and Emden.

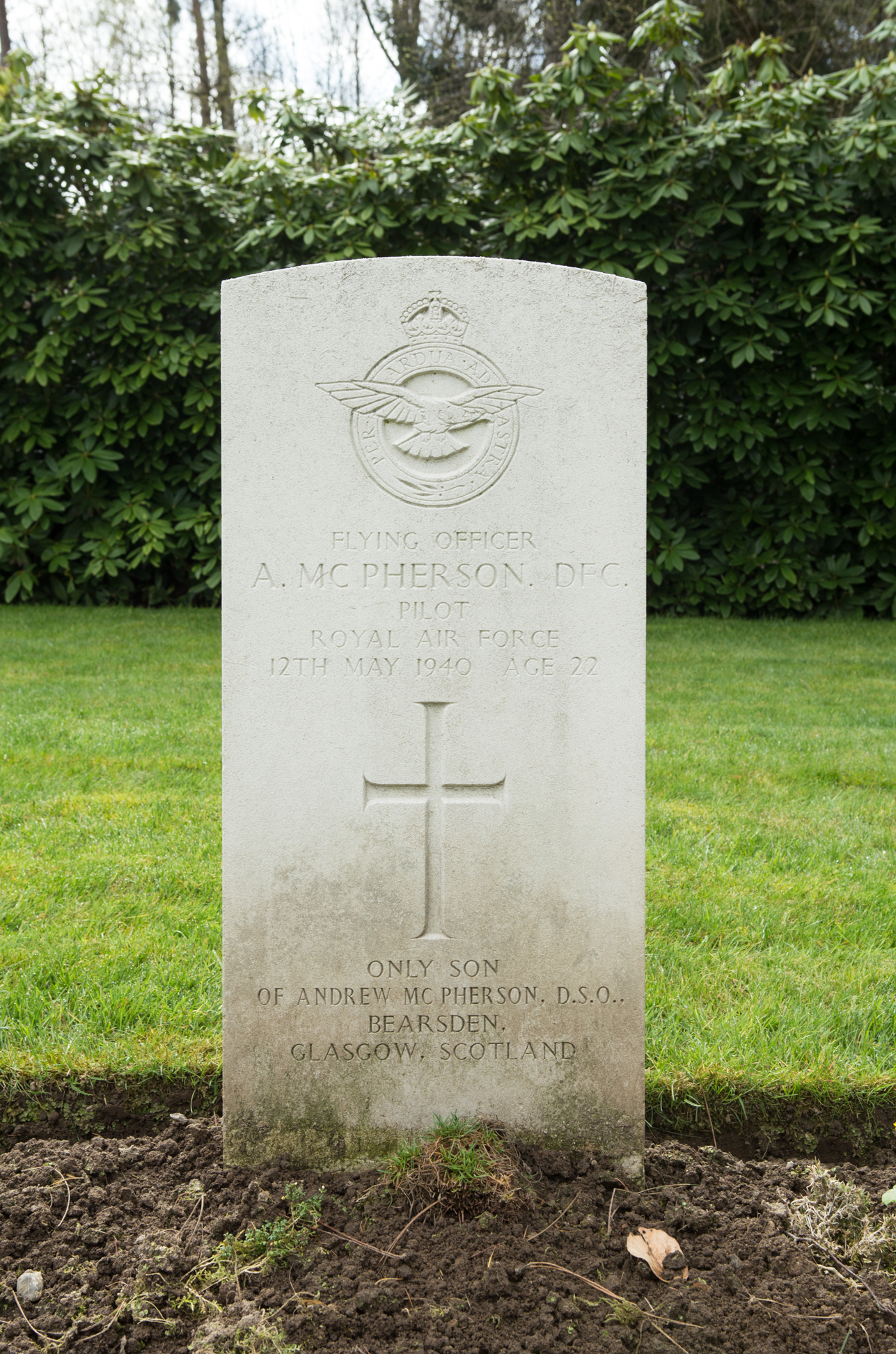
McPherson's grave at the Heverlee Commonwealth War Graves Commission Cemetery, Belgium

Their sightings were reported upon their return to base as the aircraft wireless transmissions failed. An air raid was then ordered on the ships by fifteen Blenheims from No. 107 Squadron, No. 110 Squadron, and No. 139 Squadron. The weather conditions were very poor when they set off on their bombing mission the next morning. Several bombs did not detonate and four aircraft from No. 107 Squadron were shot down, with two survivors becoming the first Bomber Command airmen to be taken prisoner in the Second World War. An aircraft from No. 110 Squadron was also shot down and crashed into the bow of the cruiser Emden (curiously the pilot killed in the crash was also named Emden). For his role in the action, Flying Officer McPherson was presented with one of the first two Distinguished Flying Crosses of the war by King George VI.

McPherson was killed on 12 May 1940 when his Blenheim was shot down by German Messerschmitt Bf 109 fighters near Lanaken, Belgium, while on a mission to bomb armoured columns. This was the same action that earned Donald Garland and Thomas Gray posthumous Victoria Crosses. McPherson is buried at the Heverlee Commonwealth War Graves Commission Cemetery in Leuven, Belgium.
