= List of Victoria Cross recipients of the Royal Air Force =

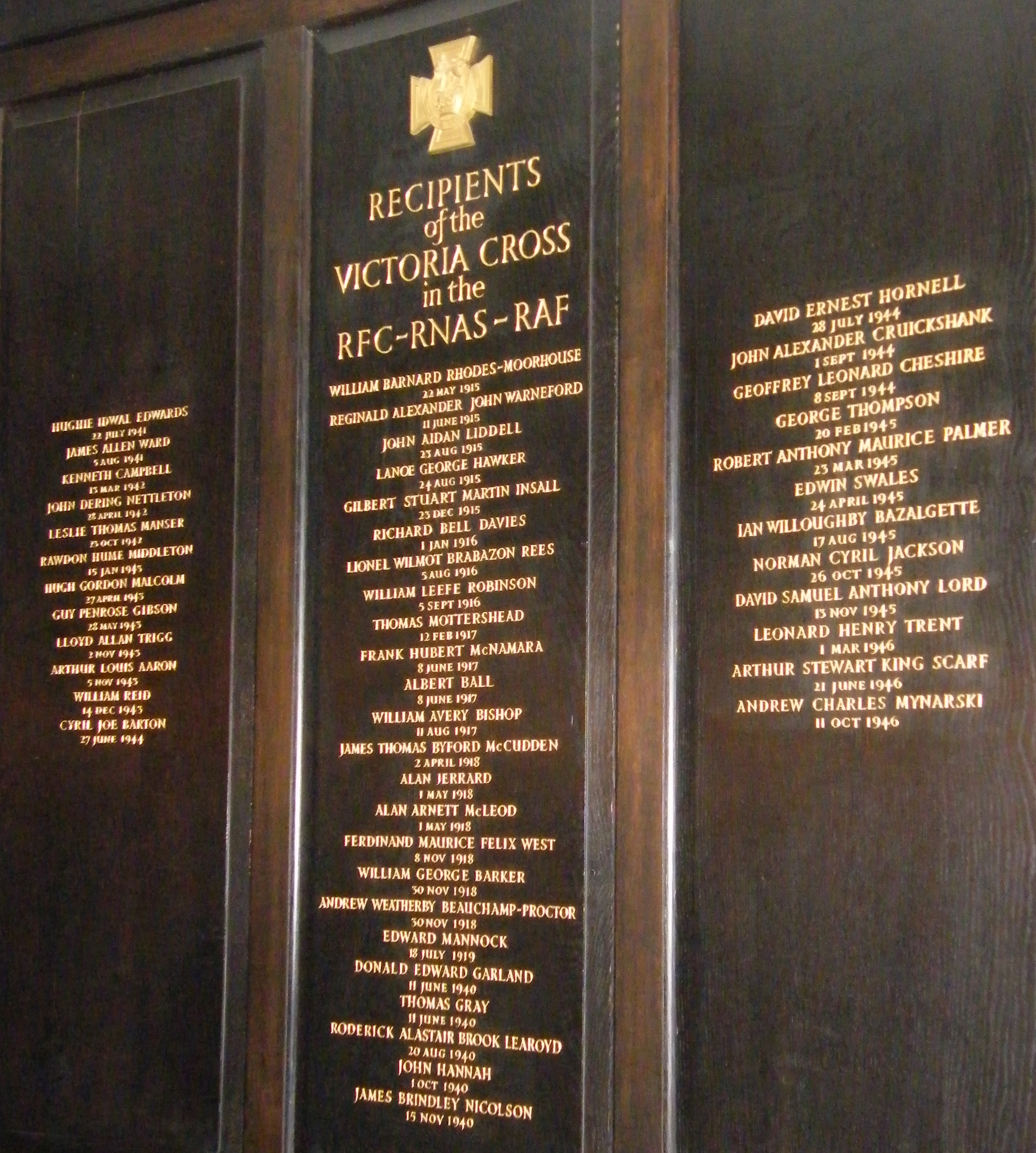
Photograph of the roll of honour to Commonwealth airmen in St. Clement Danes

The Victoria Cross (VC) is a military decoration awarded for valour "in the face of the enemy" to members of armed forces of some Commonwealth countries and previous British Empire territories. It takes precedence over all other postnominals and medals. It can be awarded to a person of any rank in any service and civilians under military command, and is presented to the recipient by the British monarch during an investiture held at Buckingham Palace. It is the joint highest award for bravery in the United Kingdom with the George Cross, which is the equivalent honour for valour not "in the face of the enemy". The VC has been awarded on 1356 occasions to 1353 individual recipients.

The ribbon is crimson, 38 mm (1.5 inches) wide. The original (1856) specification for the award stated that the ribbon should be red for army recipients and blue for naval ones. However the dark blue ribbon was abolished soon after the formation of the Royal Air Force on 1 April 1918. On 22 May 1920 King George V signed a warrant that stated all recipients would now receive a red ribbon and the living recipients of the naval version were required to exchange their ribbons for the new colour.

There have been a total of 26 recipients of the VC who were serving in the Royal Air Force, including the Royal Air Force Volunteer Reserve, at the time of their valiant deed or deeds. First World War VCs awarded to airmen in the Royal Flying Corps (13 in total) and the Royal Naval Air Service (2 in total) are not listed below, see the RN page for the RNAS recipients. The vast majority of air force VCs awarded in a single conflict were for the Second World War, with the majority being won by Bomber Command aircrew and only one going to Fighter Command. Second World War dominion air force personnel under RAF command are not listed below. Their tally is as follows: Royal New Zealand Air Force (3 awards), Royal Australian Air Force (2 awards), Royal Canadian Air Force (2 awards), South African Air Force (1 award). Additionally, two Royal Navy Fleet Air Arm airmen won the VC during the Second World War, one of whom was attached from the Royal Canadian Navy.

All of the 26 men who won the VC while serving in the RAF were aircrew. Although no RAF ground branch officers or tradesmen have ever won the VC while serving in the RAF, Group Captain F H Kirby, who was an RAF equipment officer, won the VC for his actions during the Second Boer War when he was a corporal in the Royal Engineers. No RAF personnel have been awarded the VC since the end of the Second World War.

== Recipients ==
This along with the * indicates that the Victoria Cross was awarded posthumously

Name	Unit	Date of action	Conflict	Place of action	Notes
Edward Mannock	No. 74 Squadron and No. 85 Squadron	17 June 1918 to 26 July 1918*	First World War	Western Front	
Andrew Beauchamp-Proctor	No. 84 Squadron	8 August 1918 to 8 October 1918	First World War	Western Front	
Ferdinand West	No. 8 Squadron	10 August 1918	First World War	Near Ham and Hombleux, France	
William Barker	No. 201 Squadron (attached)	27 October 1918	First World War	Over the Forêt de Mormal, France	
Donald Garland	No. 12 Squadron	12 May 1940*	Second World War	Over the Albert Canal, Belgium	
Thomas Gray	No. 12 Squadron	12 May 1940*	Second World War	Over the Albert Canal, Belgium	
Roderick Learoyd	No. 49 Squadron	12 August 1940	Second World War	Over the Dortmund-Ems Canal, Germany	
James Nicolson	No. 249 Squadron	16 August 1940	Second World War	Near Southampton, England	
John Hannah	No. 83 Squadron	15 September 1940	Second World War	Over Antwerp, Belgium	
Kenneth Campbell	No. 22 Squadron	6 April 1941*	Second World War	Over Brest Harbour, France	
Hughie Edwards	No. 105 Squadron	4 July 1941	Second World War	Over the port of Bremen, Germany	
Arthur Scarf	No. 62 Squadron	9 December 1941*	Second World War	Over and on return from Singora, Thailand	
John Nettleton	No. 44 (Rhodesia) Squadron	17 April 1942	Second World War	On the outward flight and over Augsburg, Germany	
Leslie Manser	No. 50 Squadron	30 May 1942 to 31 May 1942*	Second World War	Over and attempting to return from Cologne, Germany	
Hugh Malcolm	No. 18 Squadron	4 December 1942*	Second World War	Near Chougui, Tunisia	
Guy Gibson	No. 617 Squadron	16 May 1943 to 17 May 1943	Second World War	Over the Möhne and Eder dams, Germany	
Arthur Aaron	No. 218 Squadron	12 August 1943*	Second World War	Over Turin, Italy and on the return flight to Bone, North Africa	
William Reid	No. 61 Squadron	3 November 1943	Second World War	On the outward flight and over and returning from Düsseldorf, Germany	
Cyril Barton	No. 578 Squadron	30 March 1944*	Second World War	On the outward flight and over and returning from Nuremberg, Germany	
Norman Jackson	No. 106 Squadron	26 April 1944 to 27 April 1944	Second World War	Attempting to return from Schweinfurt, Germany	
John Cruickshank	No. 210 Squadron	17 July 1944 to 18 July 1944	Second World War	North Atlantic	
Ian Bazalgette	No. 635 Squadron	4 August 1944*	Second World War	Over Trossy St. Maximin and flying to Senantes, France	
Leonard Cheshire	Several bomber squadrons	1940 to 1944	Second World War	Western Europe	
David Lord	No. 271 Squadron	19 September 1944*	Second World War	Over Arnhem, Holland	
Robert Palmer	No. 109 Squadron	23 December 1944*	Second World War	Over Cologne, Germany	
George Thompson	No. 9 Squadron	1 January 1945*	Second World War	Over the Dortmund-Ems Canal, Germany	
