= Alec Howie =

English cricketer

Personal information
- Full name: Alec Douglas Howie
- Born: 3 September 1913; Saharanpur, United Provinces, British India
- Died: 22 May 1940 (aged 26); Escaut, Belgium
- Batting: Right-handed
- Bowling: Left-arm medium

Domestic team information
- Years: Team
- 1934–1935: Army (India)

Career statistics
Competition	First-class
Matches	1
Runs scored	49
Batting average	24.50
100s/50s	0/0
Top score	33
Balls bowled	18
Wickets	0
Bowling average	–
5 wickets in innings	–
10 wickets in match	–
Best bowling	–
Catches/stumpings	9/–
- Source: ESPNcricinfo, 24 March 2020

Alec Douglas Howie (3 September 1913 − 22 May 1940) was a first-class cricketer who made one appearance for the Indian army cricket team. He died during the Second World War in the Battle of Belgium in 1940.

== Early life ==
Alec Douglas Howie was born on 3 September 1913 in Saharanpur, Uttar Pradesh, British India. He was the son of Charles Thomas and Ethel Muriel Howie.

== Cricket career ==
Howie appeared in one match for the Indian Army cricket team against Northern India in the Ranji Trophy. The match was played on 4 December 1934 at Lawrence Gardens, Lahore. Howie batted 49 runs during the match, and also bowled 3 over, taking no wickets. Northern India won the match by an inning and 52 runs.

== Military career and death ==
Howie enlisted in the 1st Battalion, East Surrey Regiment, as soon as he finished his education. In 1940, the battalion was sent to France with the British Expeditionary Force. In May of the same year, the battalion advanced into Belgium to stop the German invasion, but were pushed back to a defensive line at the Escaut river. Serving as a corporal during the Battle of the Escaut, Howie was killed in action on 22 May 1940. The battalion was forced back from the Escaut to the Dunkirk beachhead soon after, and was evacuated to England. Howie is buried at Heverlee War Cemetery.
