= Janet Elizabeth Macgregor =

Scottish physician and cytologist

Janet Elizabeth Macgregor OBE FRCOG FRCPath
- Born: Janet Elizabeth MacPherson; 12 January 1920; Glasgow, Scotland
- Died: 8 October 2005 (aged 85); Benderloch, Scotland
- Education: University of Glasgow
- Occupations: physician, cytologist
- Known for: pioneering cervical cancer screening in the UK
- Relatives: Alastair Goold Macgregor (m. 1944; died 1972)

Janet Elizabeth Macgregor (née McPherson; 12 January 1920 – 8 October 2005) was a Scottish physician and cytologist who pioneered the first successful screening trial programme for cervical cancer in the United Kingdom. Her work helped lead to a significant decrease in women's deaths from cervical cancer.

== Early life and education ==
Janet Elizabeth McPherson was born at Lynedoch Place, Glasgow on 12 January 1920 to Jean (née Craig) (1886–1929) and Andrew MacPherson (1888–1946), a company secretary. She had two younger sisters, Agnes Jean and Margaret, and an elder brother, Andrew MacPherson, a flying officer for the RAF who was awarded the first DFC of the Second World War in 1939.

She was educated at Bearsden Academy, going on to study medicine at the University of Glasgow graduating in 1943.

== Career ==
After qualifying, she served in the Royal Army Medical Corps, rising to the rank of captain. She completed her training at Glasgow Royal Infirmary and Western General Hospital. She worked in Sheffield and Edinburgh before moving to Aberdeen in 1958 with her husband when he took up the position of Regius Professor of Materia medica at the University of Aberdeen.

In 1960, Macgregor became a research assistant in Sir Dugald Baird's department of midwifery and gynaecology at the university and worked with his team to establishing a trial screening programme for cervical cancer. Macgregor took exfoliated cell smears using the Papanicolaou stain, interpreted them, and trained the team in the technique. In 1963, she received an MD by thesis for her work. In an article in the British Medical Journal co-authored by Macgregor and Baird they stated that cervical cytology has now passed beyond the experimental stage' and that cervical cancer could largely be prevented by cytological detection and treatment of a pre-invasive stage. Having seen the effects of cervical cancer in practice Macgregor took the findings of research and put them into practice, encouraging women to undergo screening. She spoke with general practitioners, convincing them that their patients should be screened. She and the team at the university kept records of the screenings, and she collaborated with statisticians to evaluate the effectiveness of screening. Within 5 years of the screen servicing being established there was a significant decrease in cervical cancer in the Aberdeen area. Such was the success of the programme in Aberdeen that it led to cervical screening services being introduced throughout the UK. The research and programme were recognised worldwide, leading to the development of cervical screening all over the world.

Macgregor retired from the University of Aberdeen in 1985. She continued to work part-time as Director of Harris Birthright Research Centre in Aberdeen.

Macgregor always suspected that cervical cancer was caused by an infection, and during her lifetime human papillomavirus was found to be the agent. The vaccine for the virus was announced on the same day that she died.

== Awards and honours ==
Macgregor received several awards and honours in recognition for her work.

- Fellowship of the International Academy of Cytology, 1963
- President of British Society for Clinical Cytology, 1981–1983
- Fellowship of the Royal College of Pathologists, 1982
- OBE,1984
- Fellowship of the Royal College of Obstetricians and Gynaecologists, 1986

== Personal life ==
She met her husband Alastair Goold Macgregor (1919–1972) while they were students at university. They married at University of Glasgow chapel on 3 October 1944, and together had four children, one daughter and three sons.

She retired to the Isle of Seil. She died of cerebrovascular disease on 8 October 2005 at the Lynn of Lorne Nursing Home, Benderloch, near Oban.
