= Gerald MacIntosh Johnston =

Canadian actor

Gerald MacIntosh Johnston (1 October 1904 – 5 November 1944), known professionally as Gerald Kent, was a Canadian Broadway stage and film actor who was captured at the Dieppe Raid during the Second World War and died in a German POW camp.

== Early life ==
Gerald MacIntosh Johnston was born on October 1, 1904, in Winnipeg, Manitoba, Canada to James Macintosh Johnston and Clare Maud Mckay Johnston. He attended St. John's College before relocating to New York City in the United States in 1923. Johnston lived with his parents in New York, where he worked as a commercial model and in a stock company. Johnston had two uncles in Scotland.

== Stage and film career ==
While in New York Johnston began acting in local theater productions. He took the stage name Gerald Kent and appeared in numerous productions on and off Broadway. One of his first works was the production Brass Buttons. In 1928 producer Jed Harris offered Johnston a part in his Broadway production of The Royal Family. The following year Johnston played the leading man opposite Mae West in Diamond Lil, which had a run at the Curran Theatre in San Francisco and Biltmore Theatre in Los Angeles. In the credits of Berthold Viertel's 1934 film Little Friend Gerald Kent is listed as the Butler.

== World War II and death ==
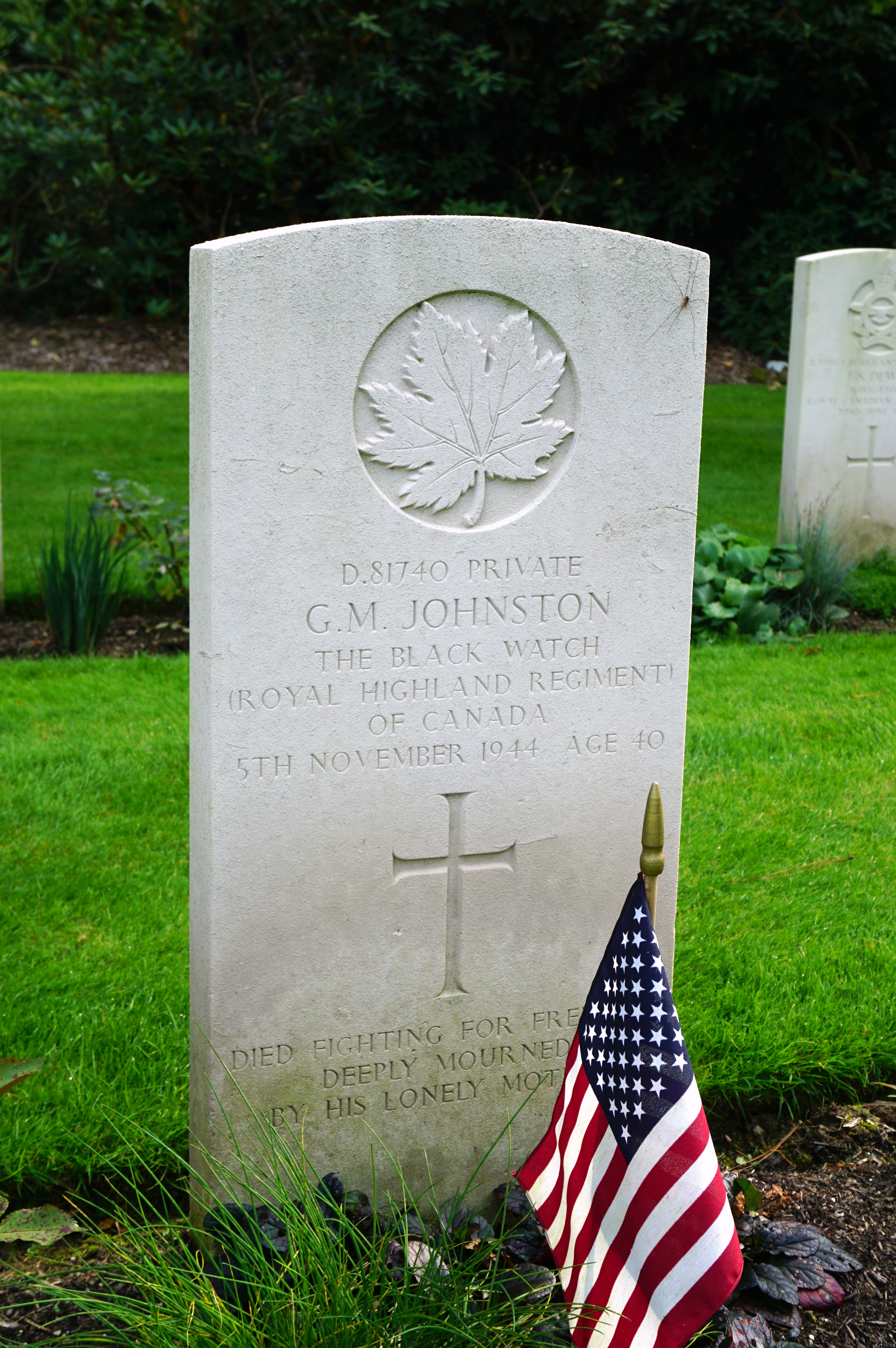
Grave, Heverlee War Cemetery

Shortly after World War II broke out in Europe Johnston returned to Canada and joined the Canadian military. He served in the first battalion of The Black Watch of Montreal as a private; he later joined the commandos under Lord Louis Mountbatten, and in September 1940 Johnston deployed to England. In 1941, while stationed with his unit in Britain, Johnston landed a role in the film From the Four Corners, which was directed by Anthony Havelock-Allan and starred Leslie Howard. Johnston played a character based on himself, Private J. Johnston, who was a member of The Black Watch of Canada regiment. The next year the Black Watch of Montreal participated in the disastrous Dieppe Raid on 19 August 1942. Johnston's status was unknown for months after the battle and he was listed as missing in action, until it was finally reported in December that he had been captured. Johnston, along with thousands of other Canadians captured at Dieppe, was transferred to Stalag II-D Prisoner-of-war camp located near Stargard in then Germany (now Poland). On November 5, 1944, Johnston was caught attempting to escape and was shot dead by guards after following their command to raise his hands. In January 1945, the Sunday Pictorial, published out of London, reported that Johnston's death occurred during a mass escape of 1,500 Canadian P.O.W's. Several days later the Toronto Daily Star rebuked this story, calling it pure "fabrication" and the "figment of someone's imagination."

Johnston's remains are buried in the Heverlee War Cemetery in Belgium.

== Stage performances ==
- December–November 1936 – Iron Men at Longacre Theatre in New York. Role: Fred.
- September 1936 – Arrest That Woman at National Theatre in New York. Role: Davis.
- October–November 1933 – A Divine Drudge at Royale Theatre in New York. Role: Kid Pauker.
- June–December 1932 – That's Gratitude at Waldorf Theatre in New York. Role: Clayton Lorimer.
- April 1932 – Angeline Moves In at Forrest Theatre in New York. Role: Jerry Dugan.
- February 1932 – New York to Cherbourg at Forrest Theatre in New York. Role: Floyd Warren.
- September 1930 – March 1931 – That's Gratitude at John Golden Theatre in New York. Role: Clayton Lorimer.
- 1929 – Diamond Lil at Curran Theatre in San Francisco and Biltmore Theatre in Los Angeles. Role: Salvation Army Captain.
- 1929 – "Bond Players" at the Show Shop in East Islip, New York.
- 1928 – The Royal Family at Selwyn Theatre in New York.
- December 1927 – Brass Buttons at Bijou Theatre in New York. Role: Kid Dickson.
