= Heverlee War Cemetery =

War cemetery in Belgium

Coordinates: 50.8479°N 4.7034°E

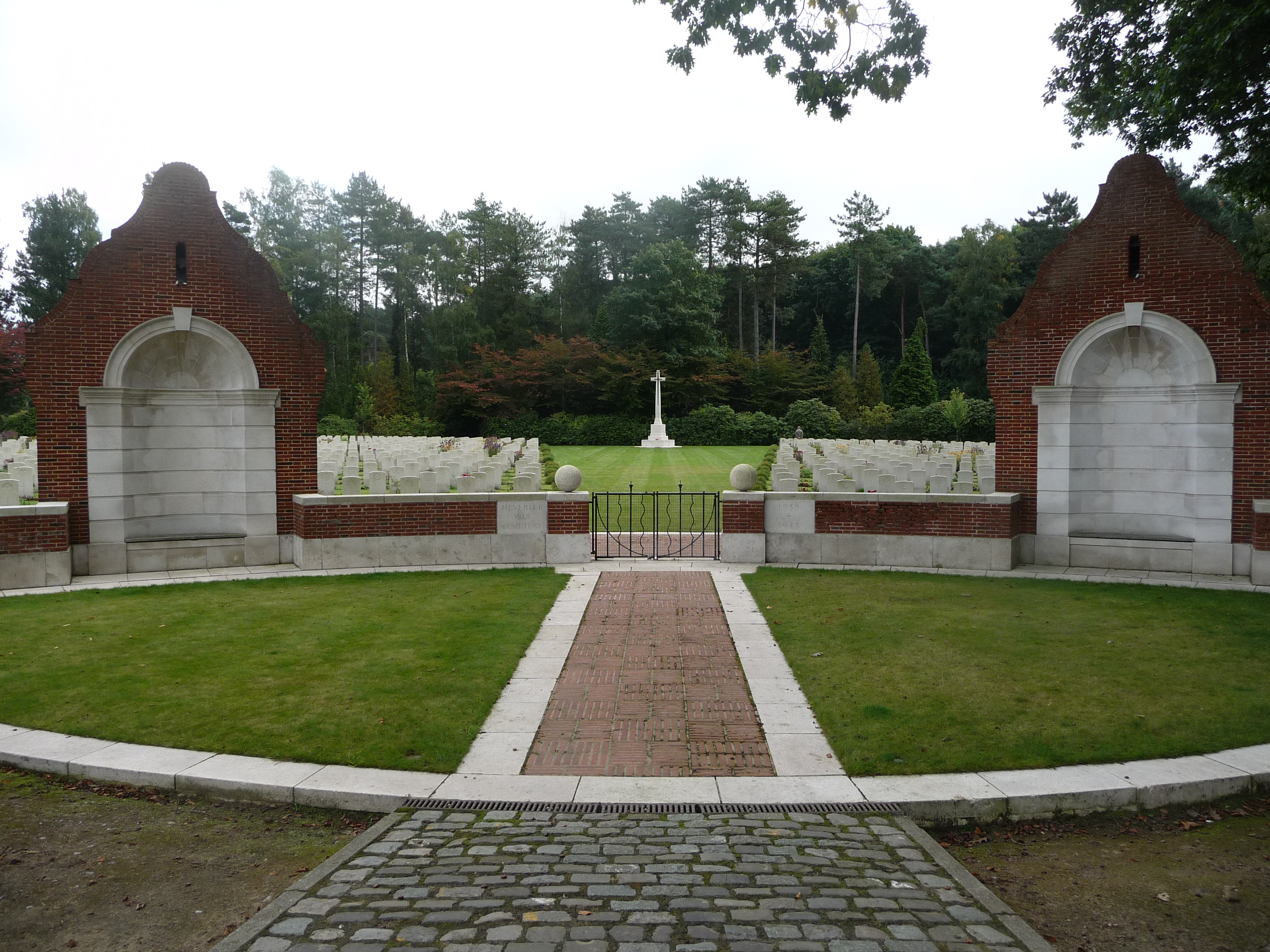
Heverlee War Cemetery entrance

Heverlee War Cemetery is a Commonwealth War Graves Commission (CWGC) burial ground for the dead of the Second World War located in Heverlee, Belgium.

The Heverlee War Cemetery was established in 1946 and contains 977 Commonwealth burials of the Second World War, twenty-nine First World War burials relocated to the cemetery, and twelve non-Commonwealth graves (including 11 Polish and 1 American airman). The cemetery is one of those designed by Commission architect Philip Hepworth.

== Notable graves ==
- Victoria Cross recipients:
  - Donald Garland (1918–1940)
  - Thomas Gray (1914–1940)
  - Leslie Manser (1922–1942)
- Others:
  - John Balmer, Group Captain, RAAF
  - Lord Frederick Cambridge (1907–1940), Captain in the Coldstream Guards
  - Gerald MacIntosh Johnston (1904–1944), Canadian stage and actor and later German POW
  - Andrew McPherson (1918–1940), RAF officer who piloted the first English plane to go over enemy lines during the Second World War
  - Alec Howie (1913–1940), cricketer
