= No. 12 Squadron RAF =

Flying squadron of the Royal Air Force

No. 12 (B) Squadron RAF
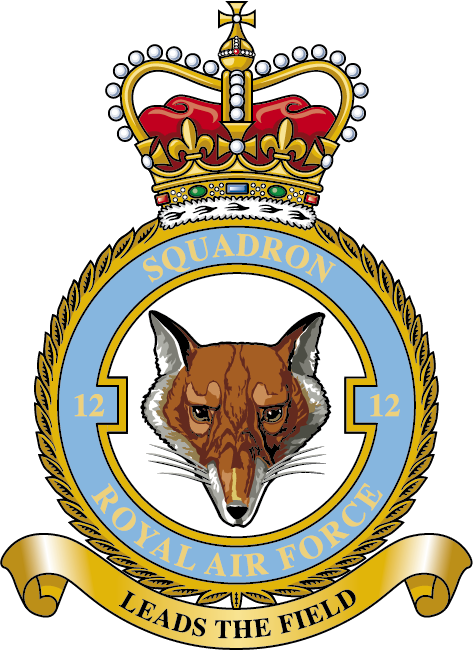
- Squadron badge
- Active: 1915–1918 (RFC); 1918–1922; 1923–1961; 1962–1967; 1969–2014; 2015–2018; 2018–present
- Countries: United Kingdom; Qatar
- Branch: Royal Air Force; Qatar Emiri Air Force
- Type: Joint training squadron
- Role: Multi–role combat
- Part of: Combat Air Force
- Station: RAF Coningsby
- Nickname: 'Shiny Twelve'
- Motto: "Leads the Field"
- Aircraft: Eurofighter Typhoon FGR4/T3

Insignia
- Roundel
- Tail codes: QE (Apr 1939); PH (Sep 1939 – Apr 1951); GZ (Nov 1942 – Jul 1946); FA–FZ (Aug 1985 – Apr 1996)

Number 12 Squadron, also known as No. 12 (Bomber) Squadron, is a flying squadron of the Royal Air Force (RAF). The squadron reformed in July 2018 as a joint RAF and Qatar Emiri Air Force squadron. It is based at RAF Coningsby, Lincolnshire, and operates the Eurofighter Typhoon FGR4. It is temporarily integrating Qatari air and ground crews into the squadron to provide training and support as part of the Qatari purchase of 24 Typhoons from the UK.

== History ==
=== First World War and Inter-war period (1914–1939) ===
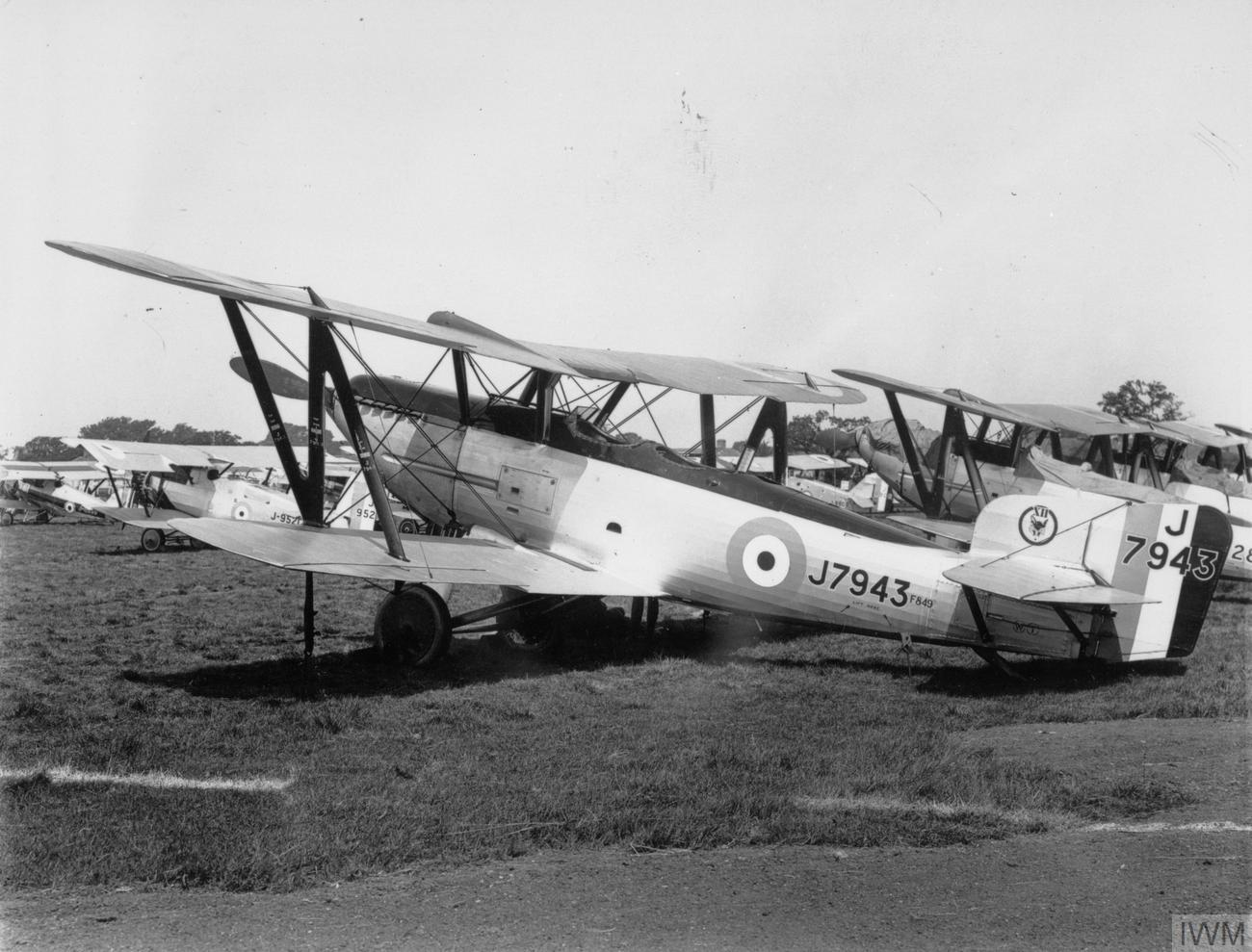
A Fairey Fox of No. 12 Squadron at RAF Hendon for the 1929 Royal Air Force Pageant.

No. 12 Squadron Royal Flying Corps (RFC) was formed on 14 February 1915 from a flight of No. 1 Squadron RFC based at Netheravon Airfield in Wiltshire. The squadron moved to France in September 1915 and operated a variety of aircraft on operations over the Western Front during the First World War, standardising on the B.E.2 shortly after its transfer. In August 1917, the squadron re-equipped with the R.E.8, operating as a corps reconnaissance squadron. In March 1918, the squadron was re-equipped with the Bristol F.2b Fighter, before becoming part of the newly formed Royal Air Force. The squadron, by then based at Bickendorf in Germany, was disbanded in 1922.

The squadron re-formed at RAF Northolt in West London on 1 April 1923, operating the de Havilland DH.9A. In 1924, it moved to RAF Andover in Hampshire and converted to the Fairey Fawn, a single-engined biplane bomber. The Fawns were replaced in 1926 with the Fairey Fox, which influenced the adoption of the fox's head as part of the squadron badge and the squadron's motto. The squadron was the only RAF user of the Fairey Fox and its performance was superior to other types, resulting in the motto of 'Leads the Field'. In 1931, the squadron re-equipped with the Sydney Camm designed Hawker Hart. In October 1935 the squadron moved to Aden, but returned to Andover in August 1936. The Harts were replaced by the Hawker Hind in 1936, and in 1938 the squadron was equipped with the Fairey Battle.

=== Second World War (1938–1945) ===
On the first day of the Second World War the squadron moved to France to begin operations. On 12 May 1940, over the Albert Canal, Belgium, one bridge in particular was being used by the invading German Army, with protection from fighter aircraft, anti-aircraft and machine-guns. The RAF was ordered to demolish this vital bridge, and five Fairey Battles from the squadron were dispatched.

At Amifontaine in France, No. 12 Squadron was briefed for an attack on the bridges near Maastricht with six Battles. After the fate of Belgian Battles attacking the day before, the commander asked for volunteers and every pilot stepped forward; the six crews on standby were chosen. Two Blenheim squadrons were supposed to attack Maastricht at the same time as a diversion and twelve Hurricane squadrons were flying in support but half of these were operating to the north-west and the others were only flying in the vicinity, except for No. 1 Squadron, which was to sweep ahead to clear away German fighters.

Three Battles of B-Flight were to attack the bridge at Veldwezelt and three from A-Flight the bridge at Vroenhoven. Two Battles of A-Flight took off at 08:00 a.m. and the Battles climbed to 7,000 ft (2,100 m); 15 mi (24 km) short of Maastricht, the aircraft received anti-aircraft fire, surprising the crews with the extent of the German advance. The Hurricane pilots saw about 120 German fighters above them and attacked; three Messerschmitt Bf 109 and six Hurricanes were shot down. During the diversion, A-Flight dived over the Maastricht−Tongeren road towards the Vroenhoven bridge covered by three Hurricanes; a Bf 109 closed on the leading aircraft, then veered off towards the second Battle, which hid in a cloud. The Battles dived from 6,000 ft (1,800 m) and bombed at 2,000 ft (610 m), both being hit in the engine; one Battle came down in a field, the crew being captured. The second Battle crew, having shaken off the Bf 109, saw bombs from the first Battle explode on the bridge and hit the water and the side of the canal. The pilot turned away through a web of tracer from ground fire and was hit by a Bf 109, then the rear gunner damaged the German fighter. The port fuel tank caught fire, the pilot ordered the crew to parachute and then noticed that the fire had gone out. The pilot nursed the bomber home but ran out of fuel a few miles short and landed in a field; the observer got back to Amifontaine but the gunner was taken prisoner.

Five minutes later, B-Flight attacked the bridge at Veldwezelt, having flown over Belgium in line astern at 50 ft (15 m). One Battle was hit and caught fire before the target, bombed and crashed near the canal; the pilot, despite severe burns, saving the crew who were taken prisoner. A second Battle was hit, zoomed while on fire, dived into the ground and exploded, killing the crew. The third Battle made a steep turn near the bridge then dived into it, destroying the west end. German engineers began immediately to build a pontoon bridge.

The attack met intense anti-aircraft fire, but the mission was accomplished, much of the success being due to the coolness and resource of the pilot Flying Officer Garland of the leading aircraft and the navigation of Sergeant Gray. Notwithstanding the success of the mission, the leading aircraft and three others did not return. Garland and Gray were both posthumously awarded the Victoria Cross.

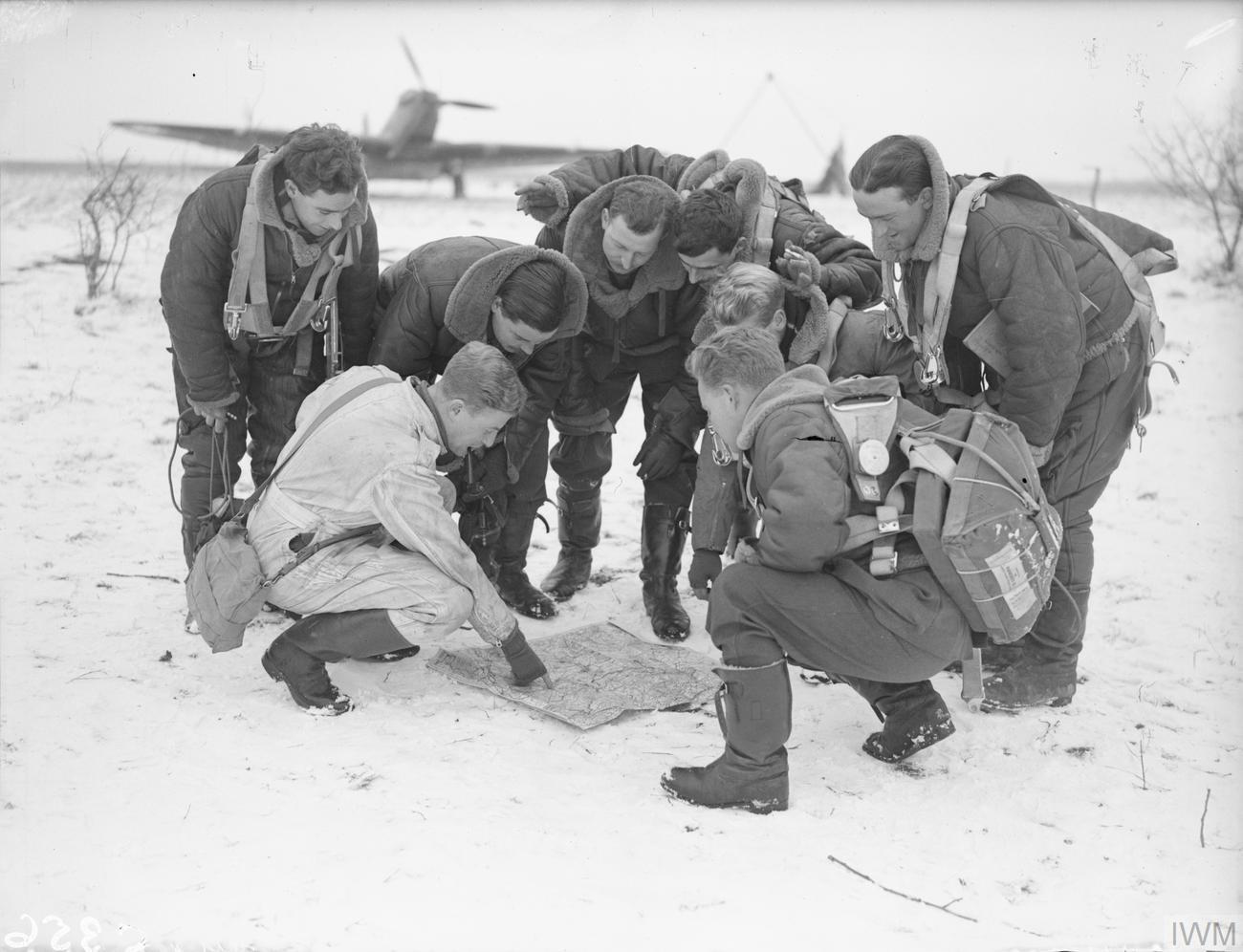
Fairey Battle crews of No. 12 Squadron RAF consult their maps on the snow-covered airfield at Amifontaine, France. (c. 1939–40).

No. 12 Squadron returned to England in June. It was stationed initially at RAF Finningley in South Yorkshire, before moving to RAF Binbrook in Lincolnshire during July 1940, when it re-equipped with Battles. Amongst other missions, the squadron carried out anti-invasion strikes against shipping in Boulogne Harbour in northern France, most notably on 17 and 19 August. The squadron was one of the last No.1 Group units to conduct operations with the Fairey Battle. These took place on 15 and 16 October 1940, when No. 301 (Polish) Squadron bombed Boulogne and No. 12 Squadron and No. 142 Squadron bombed Calais. By November 1940, the squadron had been re-equipped with the Vickers Wellington medium bomber, remaining for the time being at RAF Binbrook. The squadron moved again in 1942, to RAF Wickenby also in Lincolnshire, and soon after converted to operate the Avro Lancaster heavy bomber.

=== Cold War (1946–1993) ===
In 1946, No. 12 Squadron re-equipped with the Avro Lincoln heavy bomber. In 1952, the squadron joined the jet-age and re-equipped with the English Electric Canberra jet bomber. After 44 years continuous service the squadron was again disbanded on 1 July 1961.

On 1 July 1962, the squadron was re-formed to operate eight Avro Vulcan, a V bomber equipped with the Yellow Sun one-megaton free-fall strategic nuclear bomb, used for medium to high altitude release. The squadron initially operated Vulcans from RAF Coningsby in Lincolnshire and then later from RAF Cottesmore in Rutland. The advent of effective Soviet surface-to-air-missiles made high-flying bombers vulnerable, and in late 1966 the squadron took delivery of eight WE.177B strategic nuclear laydown bombs for low-level penetration missions. It was assigned to Supreme Allied Commander Europe (SACEUR) as part of the UK strategic nuclear forces deployed with that 450 kt weapon, that was intended as a temporary stop-gap until the UK Polaris force began to take over the strategic nuclear delivery role. The squadron stood down from this role on 31 December 1967.

The squadron was due to re-form with the BAC TSR-2 and later the General Dynamics F-111K, however but both acquisitions were cancelled by the British Government.

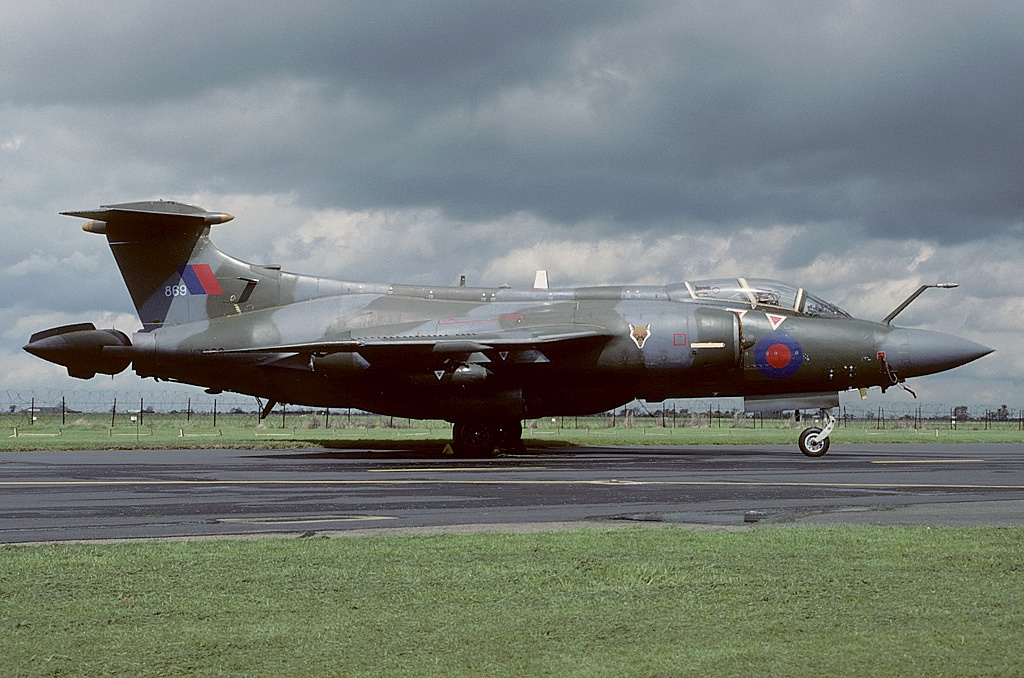
A Hawker Siddeley Buccaneer S.2B of No. 12 Squadron.

No. 12 Squadron eventually re-formed at RAF Honington in Suffolk on 1 October 1969 with twelve Blackburn Buccaneer aircraft assigned to Supreme Allied Commander Atlantic (SACLANT) in the anti-shipping role, equipped with twelve WE.177 nuclear bombs and free-falling conventional high explosive bombs. From 1974 they were also equipped with Martel missiles for non-nuclear strike.

During the late 1970s, the squadron featured in the RAF documentary film 12 Squadron Buccaneers, produced by the Central Office of Information. The film features the squadron's deployment from Honington to RAF Gibraltar in the Mediterranean for NATO exercise Open Gate, where they carry out a low-level anti-shipping mission.

The squadron moved to RAF Lossiemouth in Morayshire during 1980, still in the same anti-shipping role.

During the 1991 Gulf War, personnel from all three Buccaneer squadrons at Lossiemouth, including No. 12 Squadron, took part in Operation Granby, the aircraft's first combat operation. Following a short-notice decision to deploy to the Middle East, the first batch of six aircraft were brought to readiness in under 72 hours, including the adoption of desert-pink camouflage and additional war-time equipment. The first six aircraft departed from Lossiemouth for Muharraq in Bahrain at 04:00 on 26 January 1991. Twelve Buccaneers operated as target designators and it became common for each attack formation to comprise four Tornados and two Buccaneers; each Buccaneer carrying a Pave Spike laser designator pod, one as a spare in case of equipment failure. The Buccaneer force became known as the 'Sky Pirates' in reference to the maritime history of the Buccaneer. Each aircraft had a Jolly Roger flag painted on its port side, alongside nose art featuring female characters. In recognition of their Scottish roots, the Buccaneers were also named after Speyside whisky such as Glenfiddich, Glen Elgin and The Macallan. Hostilities ended in late February 1991, the Buccaneers having flown 218 sorties without loss, designating targets for other aircraft and later dropping 48 Paveway II laser-guided bombs.

In October 1993, the squadron retired its Buccaneers.

=== Panavia Tornado GR (1993–2018) ===
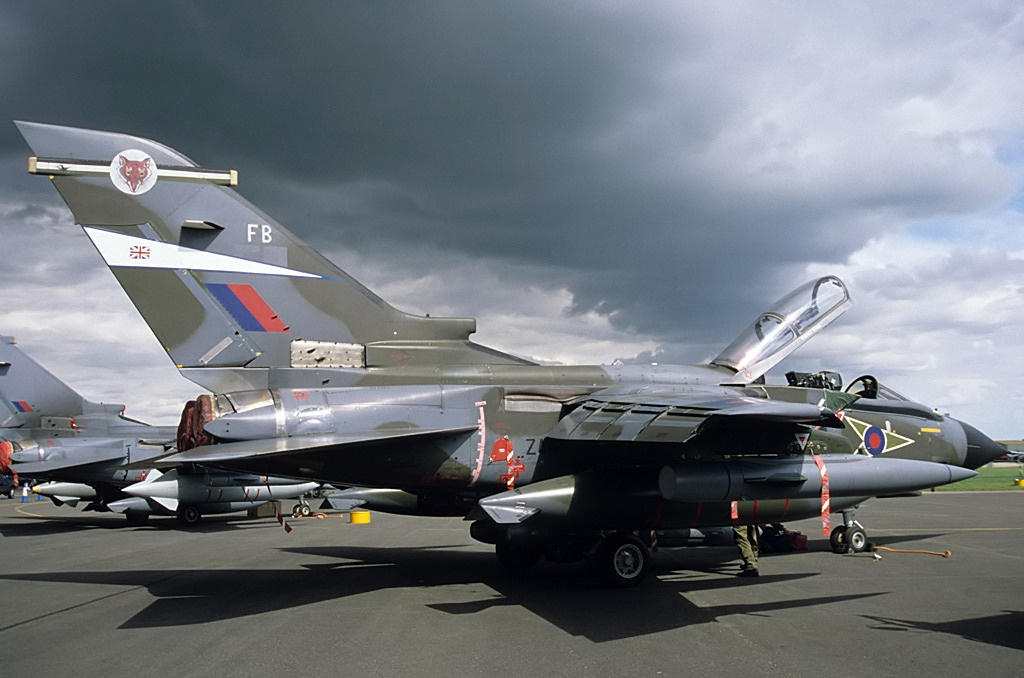
A Panavia Tornado GR1B wearing No. 12 Squadron markings and an Operation Bolton tail flash.

In September 1993, No. 27 Squadron, then based at RAF Marham in Norfolk, disbanded and immediately re-formed as No. 12 Squadron operating twelve Panavia Tornado GR1B aircraft and relocated to RAF Lossiemouth. The squadron was equipped with eighteen WE.177 nuclear weapons.

During December 1998, the squadron took part in Operation Desert Fox, the four-day air campaign against Iraq. Deployments to the Persian Gulf continued, flying the upgraded Tornado GR4 from 2001, and included major contributions in 2003 as part of Operation Telic as well as supporting the first free elections in Iraq for 50 years in January 2005. In 2006 and again in 2008, No. 12 Squadron provided armed overwatch for UK and US ground operations in Iraq. Shortly afterwards, as British troops withdrew from the country, the Tornado fleet based in the region also returned to the UK, marking the end of a long era of the aircraft in theatre. Between 6 and 16 October 2008, the squadron deployed to RAF Fairford, Gloucestershire, to participate in Exercise Crown Condor alongside Saab JAS 39 Gripens from the Blekinge Wing of the Swedish Air Force.

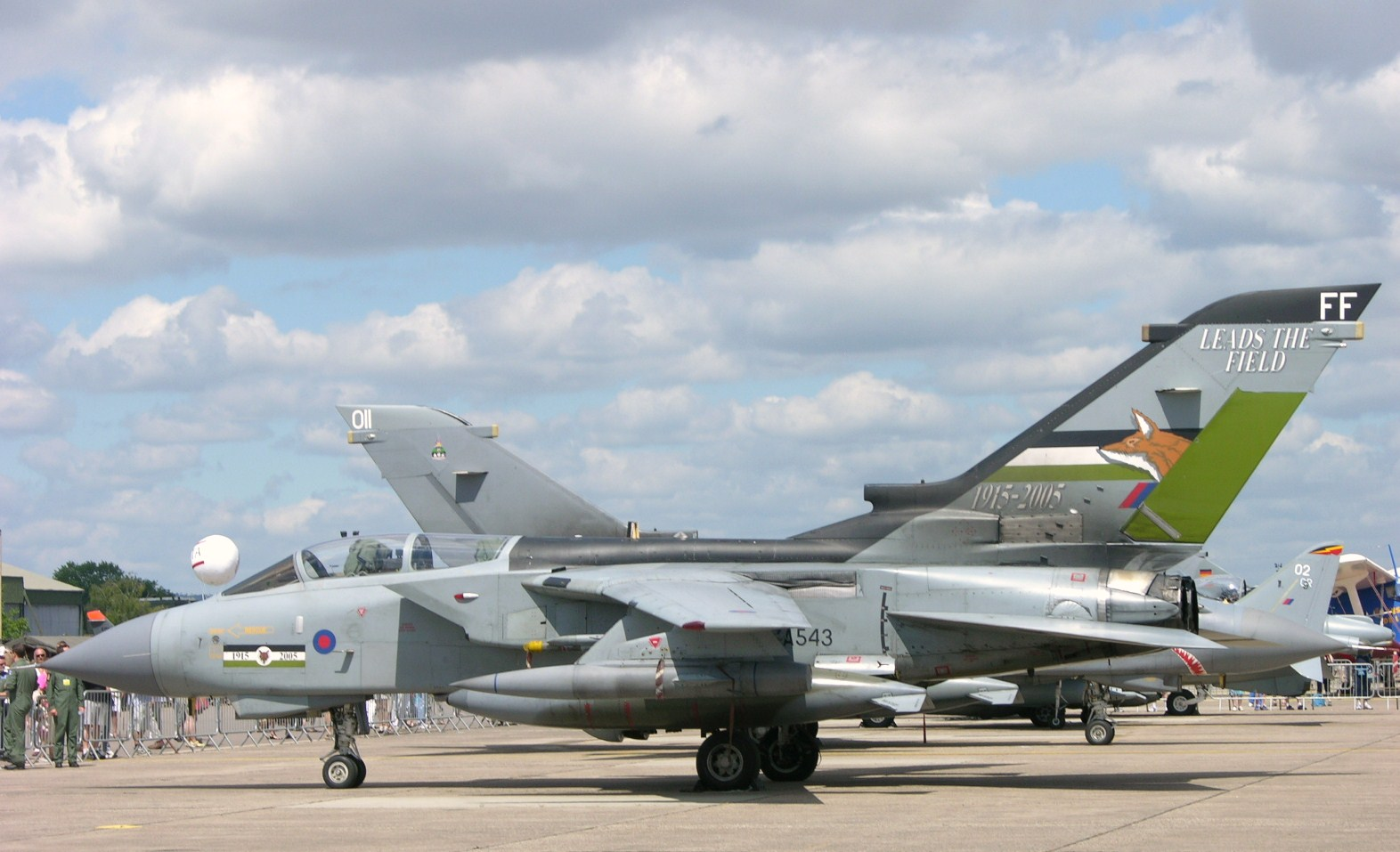
No. 12 Squadron Panavia Tornado GR4 during 2005 with 90th squadron anniversary markings.

In June 2009, the squadron deployed ten aircraft to RAF Akrotiri, Cyprus, eight of which continued to Kandahar in Afghanistan. This marked the start of Tornado GR4 operations in Afghanistan, with the type replacing the Harrier GR9. For over four months, No. 12 Squadron provided support to the International Security Assistance Force (ISAF), including close air support across the country for, amongst others, British, American, Canadian and Afghan troops. On 16 October 2009, No. 12 Squadron returned to Lossiemouth after having handed over to a RAF Marham-based GR4 squadron.

Between subsequent Operation Herrick deployments during 2011, No. 12 Squadron was deployed in support of Operation Ellamy, the UK's participation in the military intervention in Libya under United Nations Security Council Resolution 1973. This saw ten aircrew deploy to Gioia del Colle in southern Italy to bolster the Tornado component during the peak of operations. The remainder of the squadron was held at readiness to move to RAF Marham to launch raids on hardened Libyan targets using the Storm Shadow cruise missile. These missions required the Tornados to carry out air-to-air refuelling three times on the outward journey and again on return to Gioia Del Colle. No. 12 Squadron carried out their last tour of Afghanistan from July to October 2013, being replaced by No. 617 Squadron. The squadron disbanded on 31 March 2014.

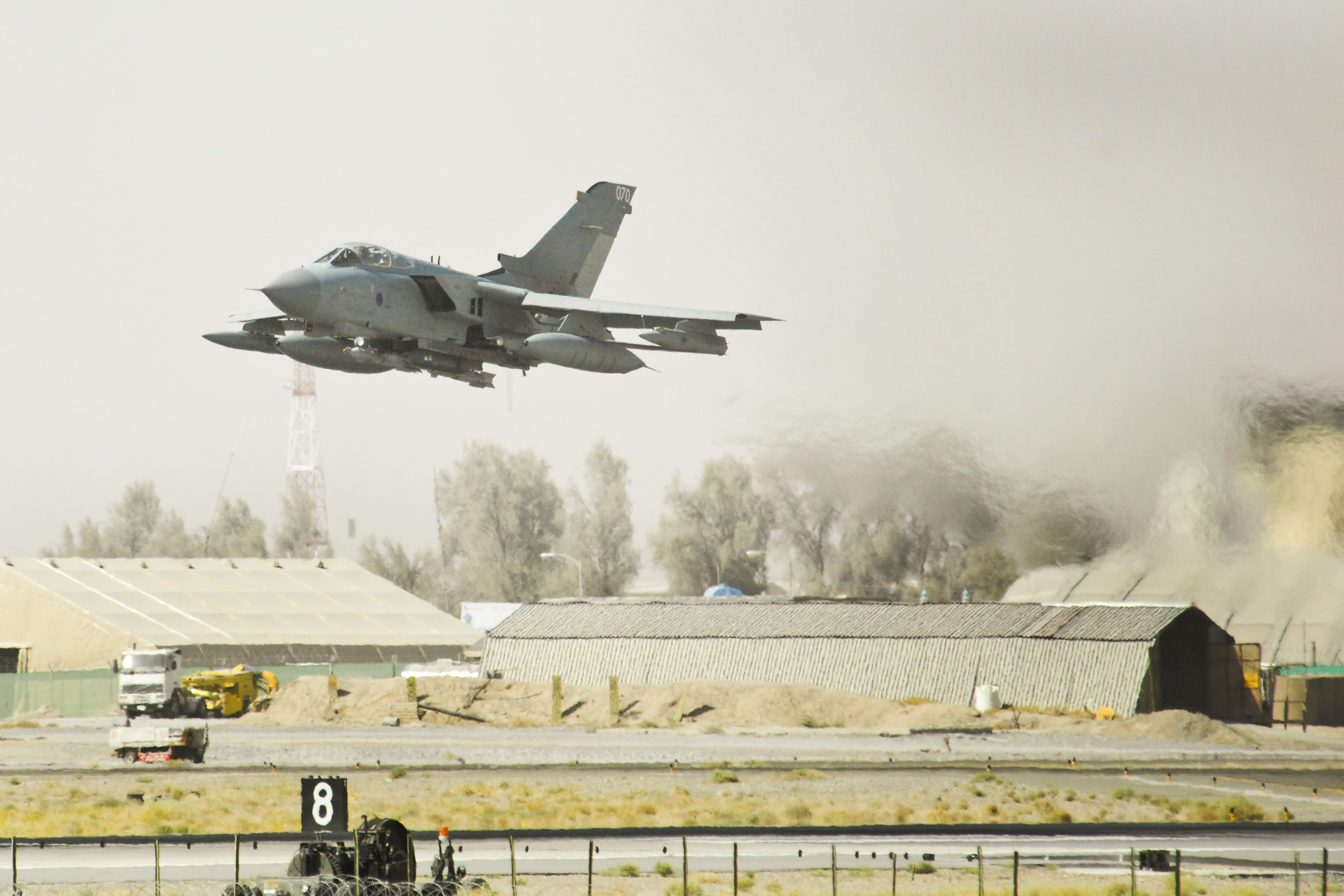
No. 12 (B) Squadron Panavia Tornado GR4 ZA607 takes off from Kandahar airfield in Afghanistan during 2009.

The Tornado was due to be withdrawn from RAF service by the end of 2015. Consequently, No. 2 Squadron was expected to stand down on 31 March 2015 as a Tornado squadron at RAF Marham, and reactivate the following day as a Eurofighter Typhoon squadron at RAF Lossiemouth. However, in October 2014, Prime Minister David Cameron announced that No. 2 Squadron's disbanding and reformation would be put on hold to allow Tornados to continue to support operations against Islamic State. As a consequence, the new No. 2 Squadron formed at Lossiemouth on 12 January 2015, and No. 12 Squadron re-formed the same day at RAF Marham, taking over the former Tornado aircraft and assets of No. 2 Squadron. The re-formed squadron was commanded by Wing Commander Nikki Thomas, the first female RAF officer to command a fast jet squadron.

In August 2015, Jane's reported that the squadron would stay active for a longer period and it was subsequently deployed to Syria for reconnaissance of Islamic State troop movements. The squadron's last mission operating the Tornado took place on 14 December 2017 in the skies over Iraq and Syria. As part of the draw-down of the RAF's Tornado fleet, the squadron disbanded on 14 February 2018, 103 years after it first formed. Squadron personnel were re-assigned to Marham's other Tornado squadrons, No. 9 Squadron and No. 31 Squadron and the squadron standard was returned to RAF College Cranwell.

=== Eurofighter Typhoon (2018–present) ===
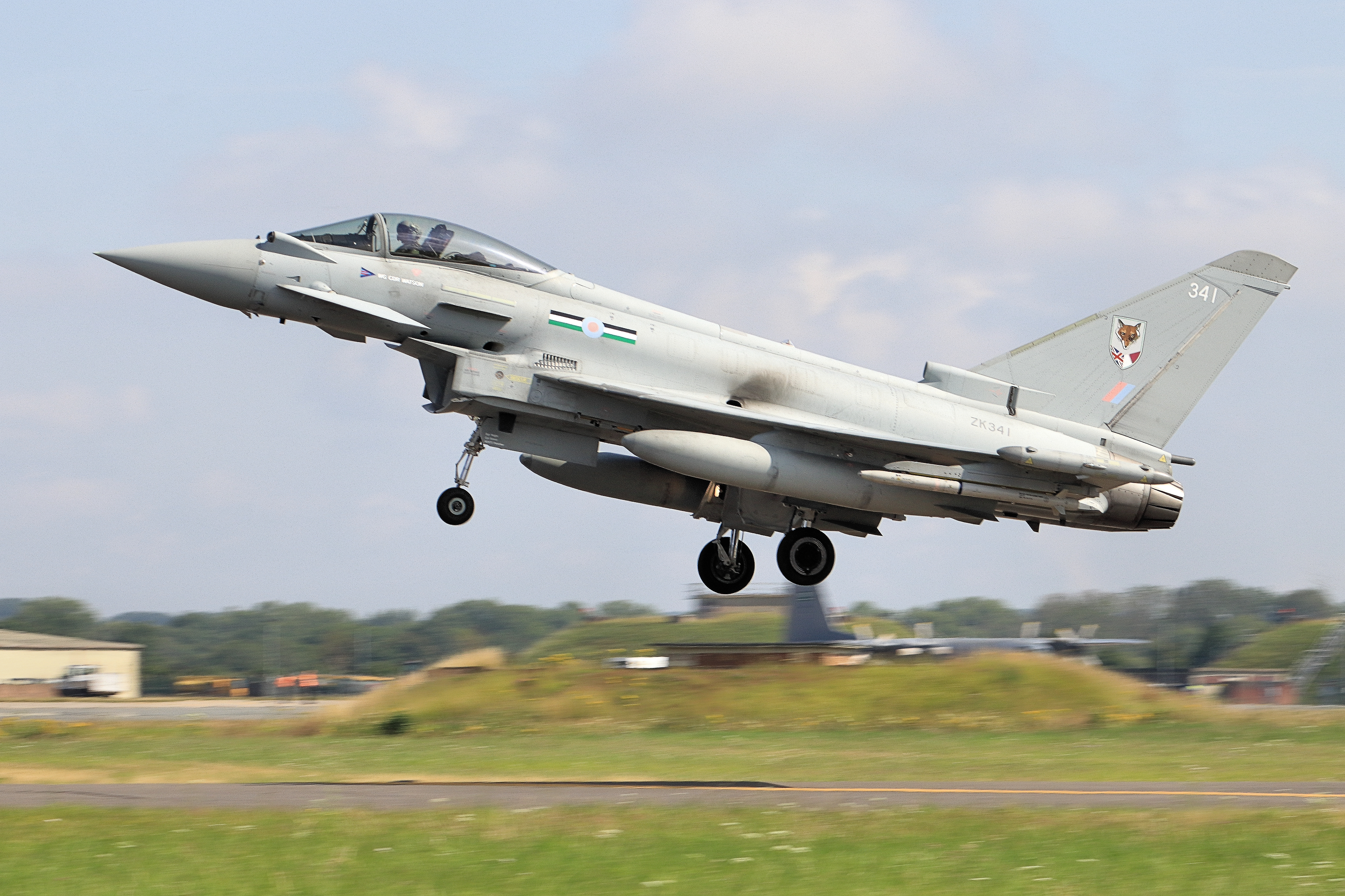
A Eurofighter Typhoon FGR4 wearing No. 12 Squadron markings at the Royal International Air Tattoo in 2024

On 14 December 2017, it was announced by the Ministry of Defence that No. 12 Squadron would operate the Eurofighter Typhoon FGR4 and temporarily integrate Qatari air and ground crews in order to provide training and support as part of the Qatari purchase of 24 Typhoons. The squadron reformed on 24 July 2018 as a joint RAF and Qatar Emiri Air Force (QEAF) unit at a ceremony at Horse Guards in London. The squadron received its first Typhoon in July 2019 at its new home of RAF Coningsby in Lincolnshire.

In November 2019, the squadron deployed to Qatar and participated in Exercise Epic Skies III alongside the QEAF for three weeks.

On 1 March 2026, during the 2026 Iran war, a Typhoon of 12 Squadron operating from Qatar, shot down an Iranian unmanned aerial vehicle (UAV) that was approaching Qatari airspace.

== Aircraft operated ==
- Avro 504 (1915)
- Martinsyde S.1 (1915)
- Morane-Saulnier H (1915)
- Voisin LA (1915)
- Royal Aircraft Factory BE.2b (1915)
- Royal Aircraft Factory BE.2c (1915–1917)
- Royal Aircraft Factory RE.7 (1915–1916)
- Royal Aircraft Factory RE.5 (1915–1916)
- Bristol Scout (1915–1916)
- Morane-Saulnier LA (1915–1916)
- Royal Aircraft Factory FE.2b (1916)
- Morane-Saulnier BB (1916)
- Royal Aircraft Factory BE.2d (1916–1917)
- Royal Aircraft Factory BE.2e (1916–1917)
- Royal Aircraft Factory RE.8 (1917–1919)
- Bristol F.2B Fighter (1918–1922)
- Airco DH.9A (1923–1924)
- Fairey Fawn (1924–1926)
- Fairey Fox (1926–1931)
- Hawker Hart (1931–1936)
- Hawker Hind (1936–1938)
- Fairey Battle (1938–1940)
- Vickers Wellington II (1940–1942)
- Vickers Wellington III (1942)
- Avro Lancaster I & III (1942–1946)
- Avro Lincoln B.2 (1946–1952)
- English Electric Canberra B.2 (1952–1955)
- English Electric Canberra B.6 (1955–1961)
- English Electric Canberra B.2 (1957–1959)
- Avro Vulcan B.2 (1962–1967)
- Hawker Siddeley Buccaneer S.2B (1969–1993)
- Panavia Tornado GR1B (1993–2001)
- Panavia Tornado GR4 (2001–2018)
- Eurofighter Typhoon FGR4 (2019–present)

== Heritage ==
=== Badge and motto ===
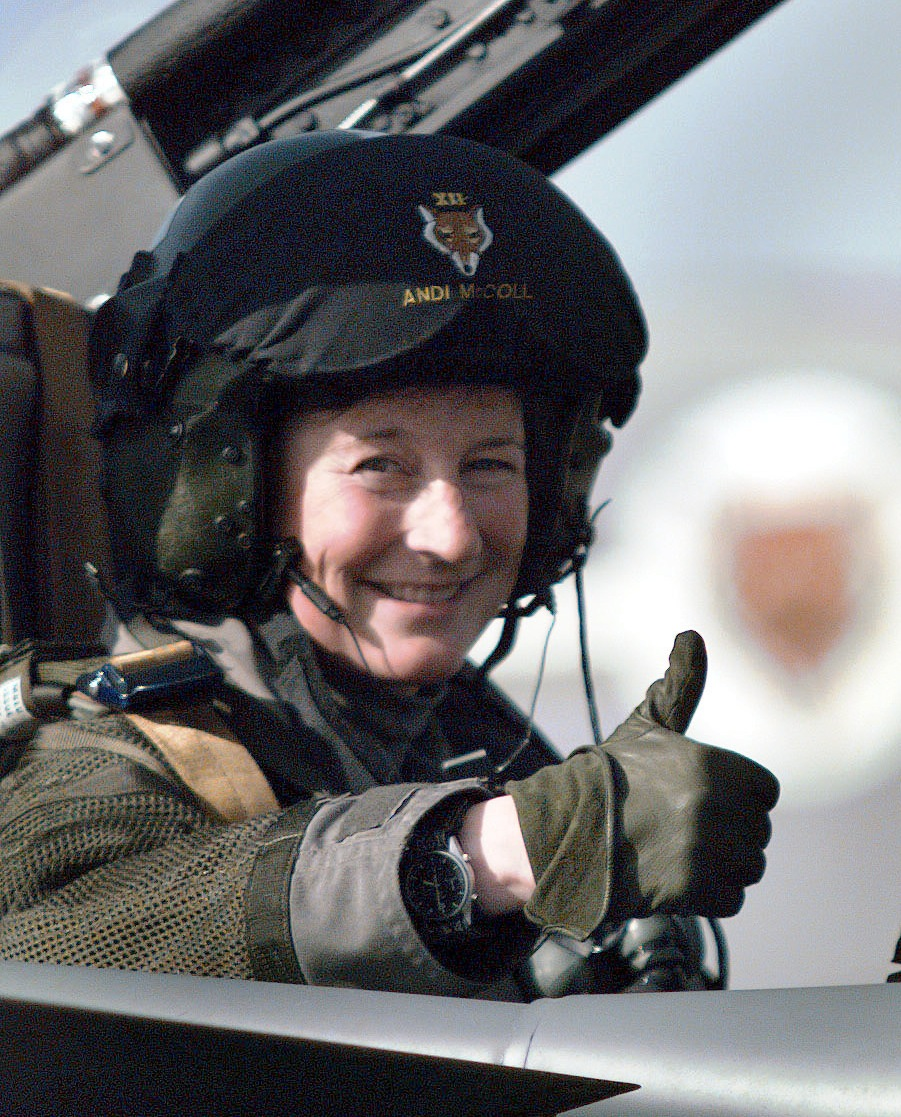
Andi McColl, a Tornado weapons systems operator of No. 12 Squadron.

No. 12 Squadrons badge features a fox's mask. The fox relates to the Fairey Fox aircraft which the squadron flew during the First World War, the squadron being the only unit equipped with the aircraft. The badge was approved by King George VI in February 1937.

The squadron's motto is 'Leads the Field', reflecting its reputation for daylight bombing development.

=== Memorial ===
A memorial was unveiled at the squadron's headquarters at RAF Coningsby on 14 February 2025, the squadron's 110th birthday. It marks the loss of 249 aircraft and over 1,150 personnel from throughout the squadron's history.

=== Call signs ===
As of March 2025, aircraft operated by No. 12 Squadron use the following peacetime air traffic control call signs within UK airspace: Deadpool, Garland, Thalab, Vandal, Vermin, and Wolf.

== Battle honours ==
No. 12 Squadron has received the following battle honours. Those marked with an asterisk (*) may be emblazoned on the squadron standard.

- Western Front (1915–1918)
- Loos (1916)*
- Somme (1916)
- Arras
- Cambrai (1917)*
- Somme (1918)*
- Hindenburg Line
- France and Low Countries (1939–1940)*
- Meuse Bridges*
- Fortress Europe (1940–1944)
- German Ports (1941–1945)
- Biscay Ports (1940–1945)
- Berlin (1941–1945)*
- Ruhr (1941–1945)*
- France & Germany (1944–1945)
- Rhine*
- Gulf (1991)*
- Afghanistan (2001–2014)
- Iraq (2003–2011)

== See also ==
- List of RAF squadrons
