= Donald Garland =

Recipient of the Victoria Cross

Donald Garland VC
- Born: 28 June 1918; Ballinacor, Ireland
- Died: 12 May 1940 (aged 21); Albert Canal, Lanaken, Belgium
- Burial place: Heverlee War Cemetery, Leuven
- Military career
- Allegiance: United Kingdom
- Branch: Royal Air Force
- Service years: 1937–1940
- Rank: Flying Officer
- Units: No. 12 Squadron RAF
- Conflicts: Second World War: European air campaign; French and Low Countries campaign; Battle of Belgium †
- Awards: Victoria Cross

Flying Officer Donald Edward Garland, VC (28 June 1918 – 12 May 1940) was a bomber pilot in the Royal Air Force and a recipient of the Victoria Cross, the highest award for gallantry in the face of the enemy that can be awarded to British and Commonwealth forces.

== Early life ==
Born in Ballinacor, County Wicklow, Garland was the son of Dr. Patrick Joseph Garland, CMG. He was a pupil at Cardinal Vaughan Memorial School, Holland Park, London from 1929 to 1935, and left with a good all-round School Certificate.

After spending some time at an insurance office, he joined the Royal Air Force (RAF) on a short-term commission. Mgr. Canon J. Vance, who became headmaster of Cardinal Vaughan School in 1928: "In those days I questioned young men closely before recommending their applications for short-term commissions because of a lurking fear that they might be forced to start life again at an awkward age, for Donald I had no misgivings whatever. He could start his life again at any time and was bound to succeed because of his independence and of his resourcefulness. I salute Garland's great heroism"

== Victoria Cross ==
Garland was 21 years old, and a flying officer in No. 12 Squadron during the Second World War, when the following deed took place for which he was awarded the VC.

On 12 May 1940, over the Albert Canal, Belgium, two bridges, Veldwezelt and Vroenhoven, were being used by the invading army, with protection from fighter aircraft, anti-aircraft and machine-guns. The RAF was ordered to demolish one of these vital bridges, and five Fairey Battle bombers were despatched, with Flying Officer Garland leading the attack. They encountered heavy anti-aircraft fire, and the bridge was hit but not put out of commission. Garland and his navigator, Sergeant Thomas Gray, attacked the bridge at Veldwezelt. They died either crashing in the village of Lanaken or in the hospital in Maastricht, Netherlands. Only one bomber managed to return to base. Sergeant Gray was also awarded the VC for this action in a joint citation with Garland.

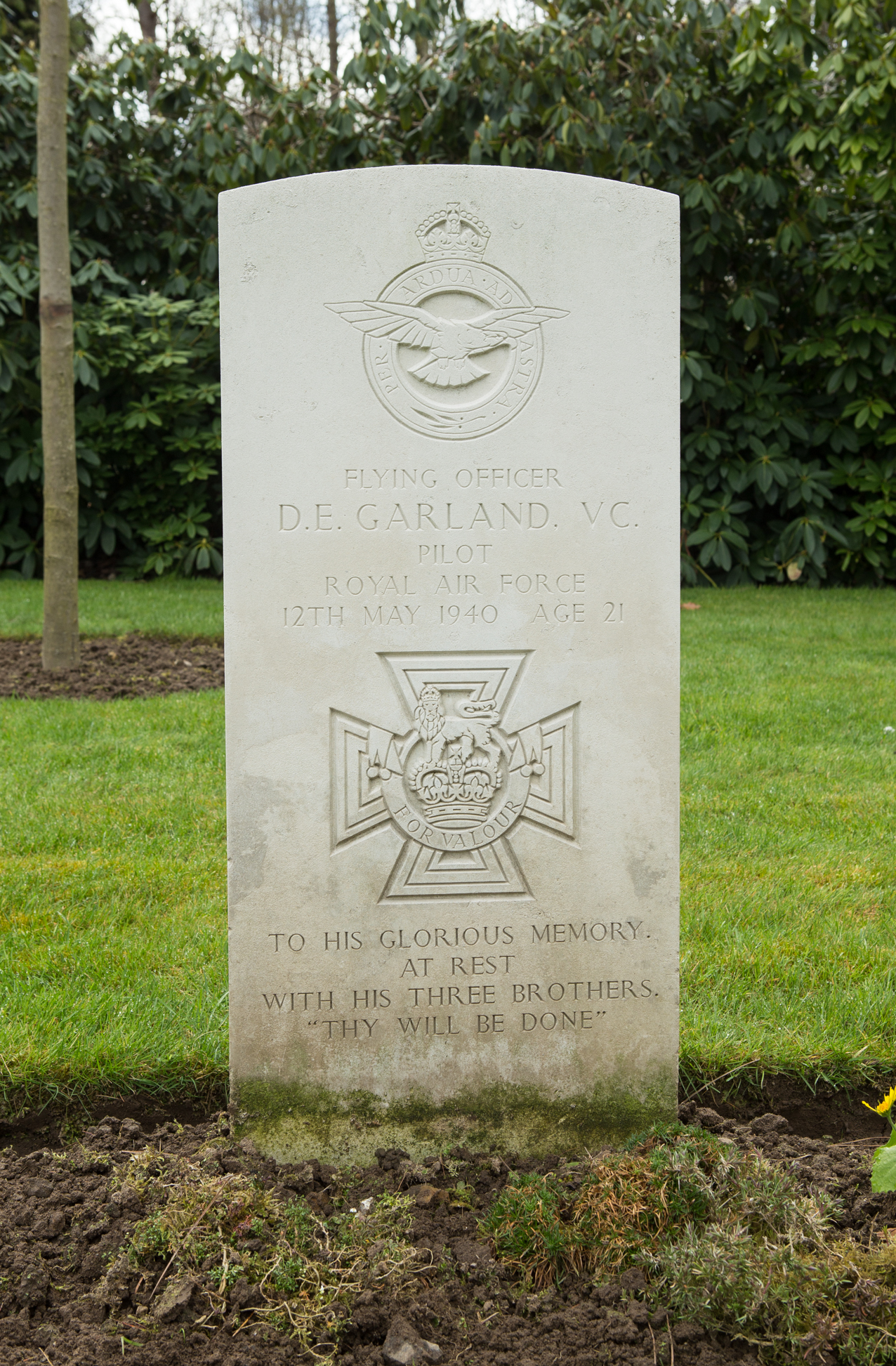
Grave, Heverlee War Cemetery

Garland is buried at the Heverlee War Cemetery in Leuven, Belgium.

Both Garland and Gray were awarded the Victoria Cross posthumously. Leading Aircraftman Reynolds, the third member of the crew, did not receive a medal because he was not in a "decision making" position. Garland's Victoria Cross is displayed at the Royal Air Force Museum London, England.

He had three brothers, all of whom served with the RAF and also died on service:

- Pilot Officer Desmond William Garland – killed in Belgium on 5 June 1942 aged 27
- Flight Lieutenant John Cuthbert Garland – died on 28 February 1943 aged 32
- Flight Lieutenant Patrick James Garland – killed in Holland on 1 January 1945 aged 36

=== Victoria Cross citation ===
The announcement and accompanying citation for the decoration was published in supplement to the London Gazette on 11 June 1940, reading

Air Office, 11th June, 1940

The KING has been graciously pleased to confer the VICTORIA CROSS on the undermentioned officer and non-commissioned officer in recognition of most conspicuous bravery :-

Flying Officer Donald Edward Garland (40105)

563627 Sergeant Thomas Gray

Flying Officer Garland was the pilot and Sergeant Gray was the observer of the leading aircraft of a formation of five aircraft that attacked a bridge over the Albert Canal which had not been destroyed and was allowing the enemy to advance into Belgium. All the aircrews of the squadron concerned volunteered for the operation, and, after five crews had been selected by drawing lots, the attack was delivered at low altitude against this vital target. Orders were issued that this bridge was to be destroyed at all costs. As had been expected, exceptionally intense machine-gun and anti-aircraft fire were encountered. Moreover, the bridge area was heavily protected by enemy fighters. In spite of this, the formation successfully delivered a dive-bombing attack from the lowest practicable altitude. British fighters in the vicinity reported that the target was obscured by the bombs bursting on it and near it. Only one of the five aircraft concerned returned from this mission. The pilot of this aircraft reports that besides being subjected to extremely heavy anti-aircraft fire, through which they dived to attack the objective, our aircraft were also attacked by a large number of enemy fighters after they had released their bombs on the target. Much of the success of this vital operation must be attributed to the formation leader, Flying Officer Garland, and to the coolness and resource of Sergeant Gray, who in most difficult conditions navigated Flying Officer Garland's aircraft in such a manner that the whole formation was able successfully to attack the target in spite of subsequent heavy losses. Flying Officer Garland and Sergeant Gray did not return.

== Memorials ==
A Vickers VC-10 Serial 'XR807' of 101 Squadron was named 'Donald Garland VC & Thomas Gray VC'.

During 2005, to mark its 90th anniversary, No.12 Squadron RAF flew a Tornado GR4 with Flying Officer Garland's and Sgt Gray's name painted under the cockpit as a mark of respect.

There is a monument on the bridge to the operation.
