= Thomas Gray (VC) =

Recipient of the Victoria Cross

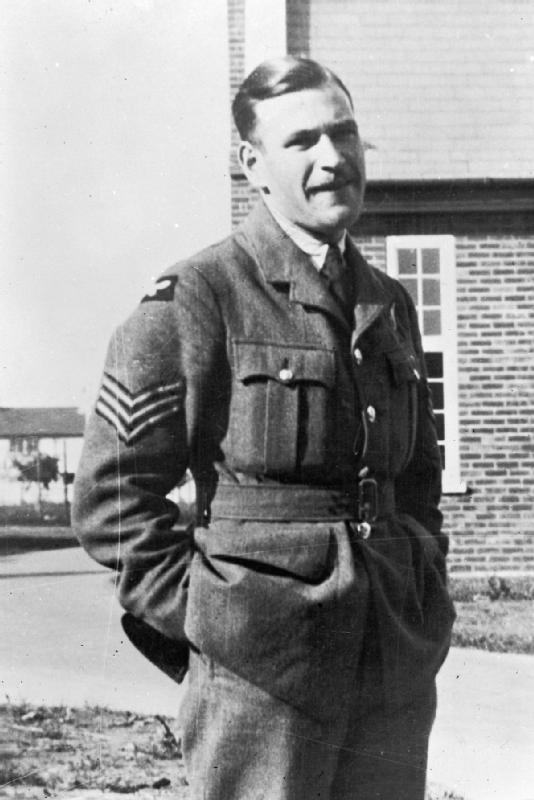
- Born: 17 May 1914; Urchfont, England
- Died: 12 May 1940 (aged 25); Albert Canal, Lanaken, Belgium
- Burial place: Heverlee War Cemetery, Leuven
- Military career
- Allegiance: United Kingdom
- Branch: Royal Air Force
- Service years: 1929–1940
- Rank: Sergeant
- Units: No. 12 Squadron
- Conflicts: Second World War: Phoney War; Battle of Belgium †
- Awards: Victoria Cross

Thomas Gray, VC (17 May 1914 – 12 May 1940) was a British airman and a recipient of the Victoria Cross (VC), the highest award for gallantry in the face of the enemy that can be awarded to British and Commonwealth forces.

From Urchfont, Gray joined the Royal Air Force in 1929 as an apprentice airman. Trained as an aero engine fitter, he also flew as an air gunner in addition to his mechanic duties. In 1938, by which time he was serving in No. 12 Squadron, he trained as a navigator and from then on performed aircrew duties. Sent to France with the rest of the squadron following the outbreak of the Second World War, Gray saw no action during the Phoney War. On 12 May 1940, two days after the Battle of Belgium commenced, he was navigator to Flying Officer Donald Garland in a Fairey Battle light bomber that was part of a section of aircraft tasked with destroying a bridge over the Albert Canal. His Battle was the only to successfully bomb the bridge but the aircraft was shot down by anti-aircraft fire immediately afterwards, killing its crew. Along with Garland, Gray was posthumously awarded the VC for his role in the attack on the bridge.

== Early life ==
Thomas Gray was born on 17 May 1914 in Urchfont, in England. He went to Warminster Secondary School and in August 1929 joined the Royal Air Force (RAF) as an apprentice airman. Four of his brothers would also serve in the RAF. He trained as a mechanic at Halton, graduating three years later as an aero engine fitter. He was then posted to No. 40 Squadron; this was equipped with Fairey Gordon bombers.

Seeking to supplement his mechanic's duties, Gray volunteered for flying duties on the squadron's Gordons as an air gunner. He found that he preferred this to his normal duties and undertook formal training in this role. In due course, he earned the air gunner's sleeve badge. By June 1933 he held the rank of leading aircraftman and was posted to No. 15 Squadron. He subsequently returned to Halton to update his aero engine fitting skills, proceeding onto Henlow for the final stages of his training. He was sent to No. 58 Squadron and then, in February 1938, was sent to No. 12 Squadron, which operated the Fairey Battle light bomber.

Promoted to corporal shortly after his arrival at the squadron, Gray attended No. 1 Air Observers School later in 1938. He duly qualified as a navigator and became part of the squadron's flying personnel. He maintained his skills in gunnery, winning a prize in the RAF's annual air firing contest of 1938. The following year he was promoted to sergeant.

== Second World War ==
On the outbreak of the Second World War, No. 12 Squadron was sent to France as part of the RAF's Advanced Air Striking Force. Based at Barry-au-Bac, it began making operational sorties from 17 September but saw little activity during this period, known as the Phoney War. Its activities were largely curtailed over the winter months but in March 1940 it started making reconnaissance flights into Germany from its new airfield at Amifontaine.

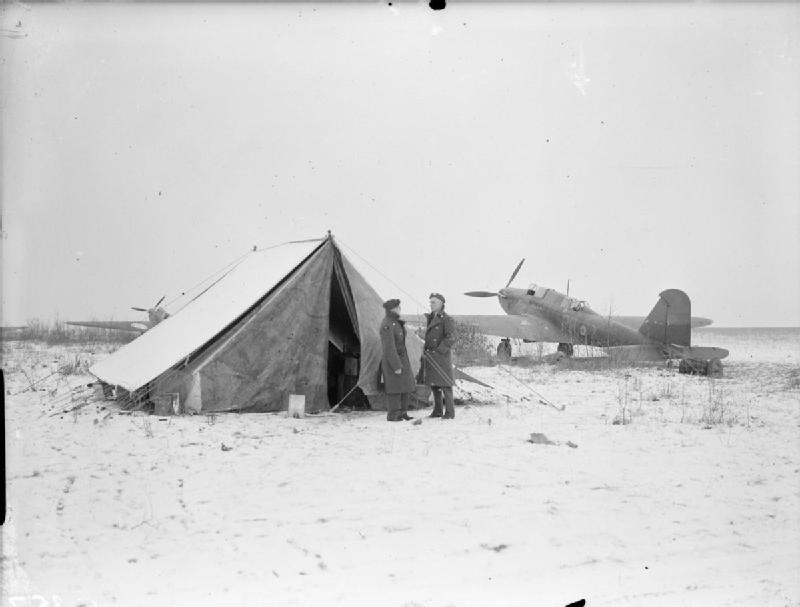
A Fairey Battle light bomber of No. 12 Squadron on the airfield at Amifontaine

=== Battle of Belgium ===
On 10 May 1940, the Germans invaded Belgium and the squadron flew its first bombing sortie the same day. Amifontaine was bombed the next day, preventing any operations being carried out for the day. The next day, 12 May, No. 12 Squadron was tasked with bombing two bridges over the Albert Canal in Belgium, those at Vroenhoven and at Veldwezelt. Six Battles, flying in two sections, one for each bridge, were dispatched at 9:00 am. They were to be escorted by several Hawker Hurricane fighters of No. 1 Squadron.

Gray flew as the navigator to Flying Officer Donald Garland, leading the section allocated to attack the bridge at Veldwezelt, with LAC Lawrence Reynolds as the gunner. Garland intended to make a low level approach to his target. On nearing Veldwezelt, the Hurricane escorts were drawn off by Messerschmitt Bf 109 fighters. As Garland's section approached Veldwezelt, it was met with extensive anti-aircraft fire. Garland released his bombs, which damaged the western end of the bridge. However, his Battle was shot down and its crew were killed. The other two Battles were destroyed without completing their bombing run. Garland and Gray's efforts during the 12 May bombing attack was recognised with a posthumous award of a Victoria Cross. However Reynolds's gallantry was not recognised. The joint citation, published in the London Gazette on 11 June 1940, read:

Flying Officer Garland was the pilot and Sergeant Gray was the observer of the leading aircraft of a formation of five aircraft that attacked a bridge over the Albert Canal which had not been destroyed and was allowing the enemy to advance into Belgium. All the aircrews of the squadron concerned volunteered for the operation, and, after five crews had been selected by drawing lots, the attack was delivered at low altitude against this vital target. Orders were issued that this bridge was to be destroyed at all costs. As had been expected, exceptionally intense machine-gun and anti-aircraft fire were encountered. Moreover, the bridge area was heavily protected by enemy fighters. In spite of this, the formation successfully delivered a dive-bombing attack from the lowest practicable altitude. British fighters in the vicinity reported that the target was obscured by the bombs bursting on it and near it. Only one of the five aircraft concerned returned from this mission. The pilot of this aircraft reports that besides being subjected to extremely heavy anti-aircraft fire, through which they dived to attack the objective, our aircraft were also attacked by a large number of enemy fighters after they had released their bombs on the target. Much of the success of this vital operation must be attributed to the formation leader, Flying Officer Garland, and to the coolness and resource of Sergeant Gray, who in most difficult conditions navigated Flying Officer Garland's aircraft in such a manner that the whole formation was able successfully to attack the target in spite of subsequent heavy losses. Flying Officer Garland and Sergeant Gray did not return.

— London Gazette, No. 34870, 11 June 1940

The efforts of No. 12 Squadron's aircrew went to waste, since faulty intelligence meant the wrong bridges were attacked. The German advance was in a different direction, towards Meuse. The bodies of Gray, Garland and Reynolds were recovered by Belgian civilians and buried without the knowledge of the Germans. Once the area was back under Allied control in 1944–45, their remains were moved to the cemetery at Lanaken. The Commonwealth War Graves Commission then relocated the bodies of the aircrew to Heverlee War Cemetery near Leuven.

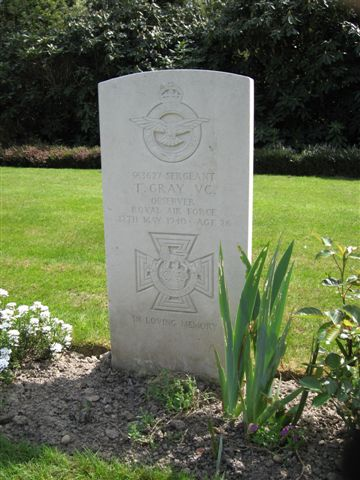
Gray's grave at Heverlee War Cemetery

== Legacy ==
A Vickers VC-10, with the serial 'XR807', of No. 101 Squadron was named 'Donald Garland VC & Thomas Gray VC'. In 2005, to mark its 90th anniversary, No. 12 Squadron flew a Tornado GR4 with the names of Garland and Gray painted under the cockpit as a mark of respect.
