= 91st Fighter-Bomber Squadron =

- Active: 1943–1954
- Country: United States
- Branch: United States Air Force
- Nickname(s): Fighty
- Colors: Red, white and blue

The 91st Fighter-Bomber Squadron is an inactive United States Air Force unit. Its last assignment was with the 439th Fighter-Bomber Group, based at Selfridge Air Force Base, Michigan. It was inactivated on 1 Apr 1954.

== History ==
Activated in June 1943 under I Troop Carrier Command and equipped with C-47 Skytrains. Trained in various parts of the eastern United States until the end of 1943. Deployed to England and assigned to IX Troop Carrier Command, Ninth Air Force.

Prepared for the invasion of Nazi-occupied Europe. Began operations by dropping paratroops of the 101st Airborne Division in Normandy on D-Day (6 June 1944) and releasing gliders with reinforcements on the following day. The unit received a Distinguished Unit Citation and a French citation for these missions. After the Normandy invasion the squadron ferried supplies in the United Kingdom.

After moving to France in September, the unit dropped paratroops of the 82nd Airborne Division near Nijmegen and towed gliders carrying reinforcements during the airborne attack on the Netherlands. In December, it participated in the Battle of the Bulge by releasing gliders with supplies for the 101st Airborne Division near Bastogne.

When the Allies made the air assault across the Rhine River in March 1945, each aircraft towed two gliders with troops of the 17th Airborne Division and released them near Wesel. The squadron also hauled food, clothing, medicine, gasoline, ordnance equipment, and other supplies to the front lines and evacuated patients to rear zone hospitals. It converted from C-47s to C-46s and used the new aircraft to transport displaced persons from Germany to France and Belgium after V-E Day.

Postwar the squadron was activated in the air force reserve in 1940 at Selfridge AFB, Michigan, operating C-46 Commandos for Tactical Air Command Eighteenth Air Force. Inactivated during the Korean War in 1951, its aircraft and personnel being used as fillers for active duty units, then inactivated.

Reactivated again in the reserve in 1952 as a Tactical Air Command fighter-bomber squadron. Inactivated in April 1954 due to personnel and budget issues.

=== Operations and decorations ===
- Combat Operations: Airborne assaults on Normandy, Southern France, the Netherlands, and Germany; relief of Bastogne; transportation of personnel and cargo in ETO and MTO during World War II.
- Campaigns: Rome-Arno, Normandy; Northern France; Southern France; Rhineland; Ardennes-Alsace; Central Europe.
- Decorations: Distinguished Unit Citation: France, [6-7] Jun 1944. French Croix de Guerre with Palm: [6-7] Jun 1944, 15 Aug 1944. French fourragere.

=== Lineage ===
- Constituted 91st Troop Carrier Squadron on 14 May 1943

Activated on 1 Jun 1943
Inactivated on 10 Jun 1946

- Re-designated 91st Troop Carrier Squadron (Medium) on 19 May 1949

Activated in the reserve on 27 Jun 1949
Ordered to active service on 1 Apr 1951
Inactivated on 3 Apr 1951

- Re-designated 91st Fighter-Bomber Squadron on 26 May 1952

Activated in the reserve on 15 Jun 1952
Inactivated on 1 Apr 1954.

=== Assignments ===
- 439th Troop Carrier Group, 1 Jun 1943 – 10 Jun 1946
- 439th Troop Carrier Group, 27 Jun 1949 – 3 Apr 1951
- 439th Fighter-Bomber Group, 15 Jun 1952 – 1 Apr 1954

=== Stations ===
- Alliance Army Air Field, Nebraska, 1 Jun 1943
- Sedalia Army Air Field, Missouri, 15 Jun 1943
- Alliance Army Air Field, Nebraska, 2 Aug 1943
- Laurinburg-Maxton Army Air Base, North Carolina, 19 Dec 1943
- Baer Field, Indiana, 1-12 Feb 1944
- RAF Balderton (AAF-482), England, 6 Mar 1944
- RAF Upottery (AAF-462), England, 26 Apr 1944

Operated from Orbetello Airfield, Italy, 18 Jul – 24 Aug 1944

- Juvincourt Airfield (A-68), France, 8 Sep 1944
- Lonray Airfield (A-45), France, 30 Sep 1944
- Chateaudun Airfield (A-39), France, 4 Nov 1944 – Jul 1945
- Baer Field, Indiana, 17 Sep 1945
- Sedalia Army Air Field, Missouri, 7 Oct 1945 – 10 Jun 1946
- Selfridge AFB, Michigan, 27 Jun 1949 – 3 Apr 1951; 15 Jun 1952 – 1 Apr 1954

=== Aircraft ===
- C-47 Skytrain (1943–1945)
- C-46 Commando (1945–1946)
