= 92nd =

92nd is the ordinal form of the number 92. 92nd or Ninety-second may also refer to:

- A fraction, 1/92, equal to one of 92 equal parts

== Geography ==
- 92nd meridian east, a line of longitude
- 92nd meridian west, a line of longitude
- 92nd Street (Manhattan)

== Military ==
- 92nd Brigade (disambiguation)
- 92nd Division (disambiguation)
- 92nd Regiment (disambiguation)
- 92nd Squadron (disambiguation)

== Other ==
- 92nd century
- 92nd century BC

== See also ==
- 92 (disambiguation)
- April 2, 92nd day of the year in a standard year
