= RAF Upottery =

RAF airbase in England

RAF Upottery USAAF Station AAF-462
- Near Honiton, Devon in England
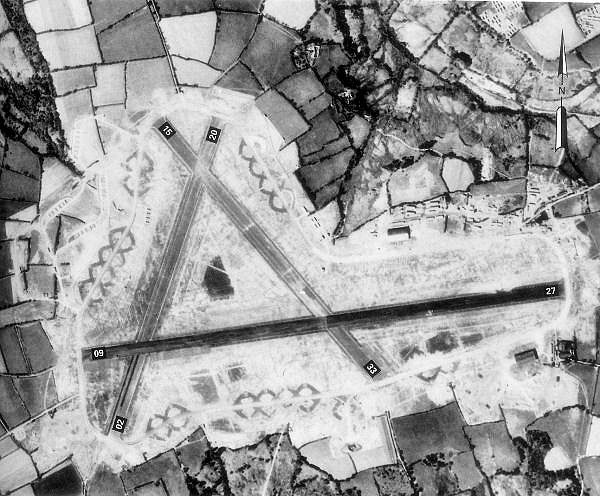
- Upottery airfield, 22 April 1944, just before the arrival of the 439th Troop Carrier Group.

Site information
- Type: Royal Air Force station
- Code: UO
- Owner: Air Ministry
- Controlled by: United States Army Air Forces; United States Navy

Location
- Shown within Devon RAF Upottery; USAAF Station AAF-462 (the United Kingdom)
- Coordinates: 50°53′02″N 003°09′10″W

Site history
- Built: 1943
- In use: 1944–1948
- Battles/wars: European Theatre of World War II; Air Offensive, Europe July 1942 – May 1945

Garrison information
- Garrison: Ninth Air Force; Fleet Air Wing 7
- Occupants: 439th Troop Carrier Group; Patrol Bomber Squadrons 107th and 112th

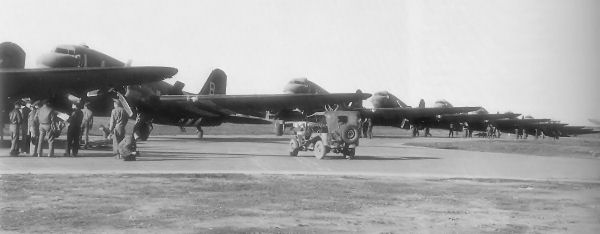
C-47s of the 91st Troop Carrier Squadron on the northwest perimeter track adjacent to the main hangar at Upottery.

Royal Air Force Upottery or more simply RAF Upottery (also known as Smeatharpe) is a former Royal Air Force station in East Devon, England. The airfield is located near the village of Upottery, about 6 miles (9.7 km) north-northeast of the town of Honiton.

Opened in 1944, it was used by the Royal Air Force, United States Army Air Forces (USAAF) and United States Navy. During the war it was used primarily as a transport airfield and for antisubmarine patrols. It was closed in 1948. Today, the remains of the airfield are located on private property being used as agricultural fields.

Upottery received much attention in 2001 when it appeared in the first episode of the television mini-series Band of Brothers. It was from Upottery that Easy Company of the 506th Parachute Infantry Regiment, 101st Airborne Division boarded Douglas C-47 transports and made their first combat jump into Normandy on 6 June 1944.

== U.S. Army Air Forces use ==
Officially opened on 17 February 1944, it was referred to as AAF-462 instead of its location for security reasons. Its ID code was "UO".

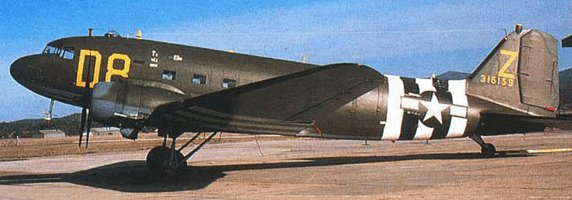
Douglas C-47A-80-DL Serial 43-15159 of the 94th Troop Carrier Squadron in Normandy Invasion Markings.

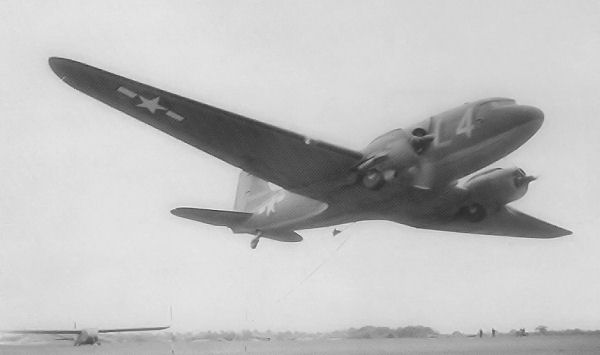
C-47s of the 91st Troop Carrier Squadron practicing the "pick up" method of towing a glider, Upottery, May 1944.

=== 439th Troop Carrier Group ===
The 439th Troop Carrier Group and its four squadrons arrived in England on 10 March 1944 and were based at RAF Balderton, Nottinghamshire, England. The group was equipped with about 70 Douglas C-47 Skytrains and was assigned to the 50th Troop Carrier Wing, IX Troop Carrier Command, Ninth Air Force. The group's four squadrons and their fuselage codes were:

- 91st Troop Carrier Squadron (L4)
- 92nd Troop Carrier Squadron (J8)
- 93rd Troop Carrier Squadron (3B)
- 94th Troop Carrier Squadron (D8)

The group moved to RAF Upottery on 26 April and trained for the invasion of France. On D-Day, 6 June 1944, the four squadrons dropped paratroopers of the U.S. 101st Airborne Division; on the following day, they released gliders with reinforcements. The group received two decorations for these actions: a U.S. Distinguished Unit Citation and a French Croix de Guerre with Palm.

After the Normandy invasion, the group ferried supplies in the United Kingdom until the air echelons of three squadrons, the 91st, 92nd and 94th Troop Carrier Squadrons, began operating from Orbetello Airfield, Italy from 18 July to 24 August. Their mission was to transport cargo to Rome and evacuate wounded personnel. During the invasion of Southern France on 15 August, the three squadrons dropped paratroops of the U.S. 517th Parachute Infantry Regiment along the Riviera, and later towed gliders to provide reinforcements. The group was awarded a second French Croix de Guerre for these missions.

The 93rd Troop Carrier Squadron had remained in England but operated from RAF Ramsbury, England on 7–16 August, and RAF Membury, England, on 16–22 August.

After the air echelon returned to England on 25 August, the group resumed its cargo missions until 8 September, when the group deployed to Juvincourt Airfield, France, also known as Advanced Landing Ground (ALG) A-68.

== USN use ==
The airfield had been unoccupied since September 1944, and a detachment of SeaBees made it habitable. Two Patrol Bombing Squadrons (VPBs) flying Consolidated PB4Y-1 Liberators (USAAF B-24D, B-24J, B-24L and B-24M aircraft) on antisubmarine warfare patrols were assigned to Naval Air Facility (NAF) Upottery in 1945. The two squadrons were tasked to assist No. 19 Group, RAF Coastal Command in patrols in the English Channel, Irish Sea and Bay of Biscay. NAF Upottery was a satellite field to NAF Dunkeswell, Devon, England and it was returned to RAF control on 31 July 1945.

The two squadrons were:

- VPB-107: This squadron was deployed at NAF Natal, Rio Grande do Norte, Brazil until being ordered to redeploy to NAF Upottery and being assigned to Fleet Air Wing Seven (FAW-7). While operating from NAF Natal, the squadron had sunk five German U-boats operating in the South Atlantic Ocean. Squadron headquarters was established at NAF Upottery on 10 January 1945 and the squadron became operational on 21 January. After the war, the squadron departed England aboard seaplane tender USS Albemarle (AV-5) on 4 June and arrived at Norfolk, Virginia on 14 June.
- VPB-112: This squadron was deployed at NAF Port Lyautey, French Morocco, when orders were received to cease operations and prepare to transfer to England. Squadron headquarters were established at NAF Upottery on 9 January 1945 and the squadron was assigned to FAW-7. Operations began from this base on 15 February. With the surrender of Germany the U-boats still at sea began to surrender to the Allies. Three U-boats surrendered to the aircraft of VPB-112: on 9 May U-249 surrendered, on 10 May U-825 surrendered and on 11 May U-516 surrendered. On 5 June, squadron personnel boarded the seaplane tender USS Albemarle (AV-5) which arrived at Norfolk, Virginia, on 14 June.

== Civil use ==
Upon its release from military use, the airfield was returned to agriculture. All three runways remain with most of the concreted areas still intact. Part of the airfield is used by a small flying club and another section is used for stock car racing on a purpose-built concrete oval, parts of it are also used for rallying, drag racing and drifting.

Nearby is a free museum featuring a collection of weapons, militaria, and documents connected with the D-Day invasion.

== See also ==
- List of former Royal Air Force stations
- 101st Airborne Division
