= 94th Flying Training Squadron =

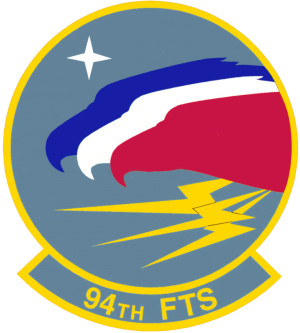
- 94th Flying Training Squadron emblem
- Active: 1943-1946; 1949-1951; 1983-present
- Country: United States
- Branch: United States Air Force
- Role: Flying Training
- Part of: Air Education and Training Command
- Garrison/HQ: United States Air Force Academy
- Motto: The First Flight That Defines a Career
- Engagements: Operation Overlord; Operation Dragoon; Operation Market Garden; Operation Varsity
- Decorations: Distinguished Unit Citation; French Croix de Guerre with Palm; French Fourragère

Commanders
- Current commander: Lt Col Curtis D Holtman

The 94th Flying Training Squadron is part of the 306th Flying Training Group based at the United States Air Force Academy, Colorado. It conducts glider training for Air Force Academy cadets and operates at one of the busiest visual flight rules airfields. The squadron is the parent unit of the Air Force Academy's Aerobatic Demonstration Team and the Sailplane Racing Team, and is augmented by the reserve 70th Flying Training Squadron.

== History ==
=== World War II ===
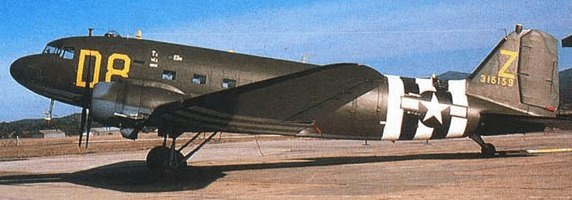
94th Troop Carrier Squadron C-47 (Note: Aircraft is Douglas C-47A-80-DL Skytrain serial 43-15159 in Normady Invasion Markings.)

Activated in June 1943 under I Troop Carrier Command and equipped with Douglas C-47 Skytrains. Trained in various parts of the eastern United States until the end of 1943. Deployed to England and assigned to IX Troop Carrier Command.

Prepared for the invasion of Nazi-occupied Europe. Began operations by dropping paratroops of the 101st Airborne Division in Normandy on D-Day (6 June 1944) and releasing gliders with reinforcements on the following day. The unit received a Distinguished Unit Citation and a French citation for these missions. After the Normandy invasion the squadron ferried supplies in the United Kingdom.

After moving to France in September, the unit dropped paratroops of the 82nd Airborne Division near Nijmegen and towed gliders carrying reinforcements during the airborne attack on the Netherlands. In December, it participated in the Battle of the Bulge by releasing gliders with supplies for the 101st Airborne Division near Bastogne.

When the Allies made the air assault across the Rhine River in March 1945, each aircraft towed two gliders with troops of the 17th Airborne Division and released them near Wesel. The squadron also hauled food, clothing, medicine, gasoline, ordnance equipment, and other supplies to the front lines and evacuated patients to rear zone hospitals. It converted from C-47s to Curtiss C-46 Commandos and the new aircraft to transport displaced persons from Germany to France and Belgium after V-E Day.

Returned to the U.S. during the period July–September 1945, and trained with C-46 aircraft until inactivated.

=== Reserve operations ===
The squadron was activated in the reserves in 1949. It was mobilized in 1951, but immediately inactivated and its personnel used as fillers for other units.

=== Airmanship training ===
The squadron has taught soaring to cadets at the United States Air Force Academy since October 1983.

=== Campaigns and decorations ===
- Campaigns: Rome-Arno, Normandy; Northern France; Southern France; Rhineland; Ardennes-Alsace; Central Europe.
- Decorations: Distinguished Unit Citation. France, [6-7] Jun 1944. French Croix de Guerre with Palm. [6-7] Jun 1944; 15 Aug 1944. French Fourragere.

== Lineage ==
- Constituted as the 94th Troop Carrier Squadron on 14 May 1943

Activated on 1 June 1943
Inactivated on 31 July 1946

- Redesignated 94th Troop Carrier Squadron, Medium on 19 May 1949

Activated in the reserve on 27 June 1949
Ordered to active service on 1 April 1951
Inactivated on 3 April 1951

- Redesignated 94th Airmanship Training Squadron on 30 September 1983

Activated on 1 October 1983
Redesignated 94th Flying Training Squadron on 31 October 1994

=== Assignments ===
- 439th Troop Carrier Group, 1 June 1943
- Third Air Force, 10 June–31 July 1946
- 439th Troop Carrier Group, 27 June 1949 – 3 April 1951
- United States Air Force Academy, 1 October 1983
- 34th Operations Group, 31 October 1994
- 306th Flying Training Group, 4 Oct 2004 – present

=== Stations ===
- Alliance Army Air Field, Nebraska, 1 June 1943
- Sedalia Army Air Field, Missouri, 15 June 1943
- Alliance Army Air Field, Nebraska, 2 August 1943
- Laurinburg-Maxton Army Air Base, North Carolina, 16 December 1943
- Baer Field, Indiana, 2–14 February 1944
- RAF Balderton (AAF-482), England, 10 March 1944
- RAF Upottery (AAF-462), England, 26 April 1944
- Juvincourt Airfield (A-68), France, 8 September 1944
- Lonray Airfield (A-45), France, 28 September 1944
- Chateaudun Airfield (A-39), France, 4 November 1944 – 7 September 1945
- Baer Field, Indiana, 22 September 1945
- Sedalia Army Air Field, Missouri, 7 October 1945 – 10 June 1946
- Selfridge Air Force Base, Michigan, 27 June 1949 – 3 April 1951
- USAF Academy, Colorado, 1 Oct 1983 – present

=== Aircraft ===
- Douglas C-47 Skytrain (1943–1945)
- Curtiss C-46 Commando (1945–1946)
- North American T-6 Texan (1949–1950)
- Beechcraft T-7 Navigator (1949–1951)
- Beechcraft T-11 Kansan (1949–1951)
- Curtiss TC-46 Commando (1949–1951)
- de Havilland Canada UV-18 Twin Otter (1983 - 1994)
- LET TG-10B Blanik (2002–2012)
- LET TG-10C Blanik (2002–2011)
- Schempp-Hirth TG-15A Duo Discus (2008–present)
- Schempp-Hirth TG-15B Discus 2 (2008–present)
- DG Flugzeugbau TG-16A (2011–present)
- MDM 1 TG-17A Fox (2024–present)
