= 93rd Fighter Squadron =

93rd Fighter Squadron

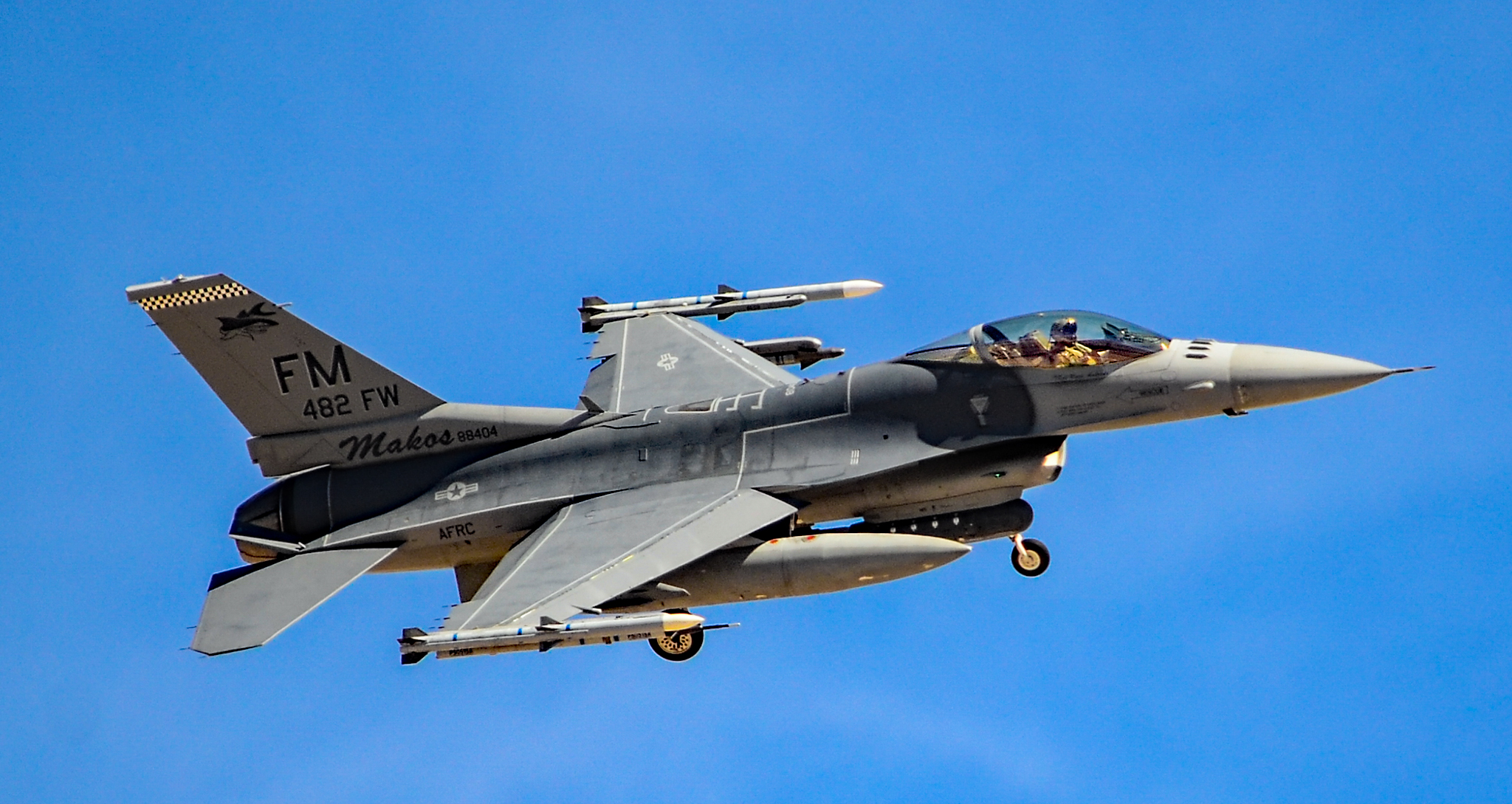
- 93d Fighter Squadron F-16C Fighting Falcon
- Active: 1 Jun 1943 – 1 Jun 1946; 27 Jun 1949 – 3 Apr 1951; 15 Jun 1952 – 16 Nov 1957; 1 Oct 1978 – present
- Country: United States
- Branch: United States Air Force
- Role: Fighter
- Part of: Air Force Reserve Command
- Garrison/HQ: Homestead Air Reserve Base
- Nickname: Makos
- Equipment: General Dynamics F-16C/D Fighting Falcon
- Engagements: Battle of Normandy; Operation Market Garden; Siege of Bastogne; Operation Plunder; Operation Northern Watch; Operation Southern Watch; Operation Enduring Freedom; Operation Iraqi Freedom
- Decorations: Distinguished Unit Citation; Air Force Outstanding Unit Award; French Croix de Guerre with Palm

Insignia
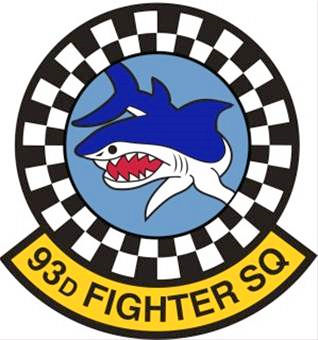
- 93d Fighter Squadron emblem (approved 11 June 1979)
- Squadron codes: 3B (June 1943 – June 1946); FM (Oct 1978 – present)

The 93d Fighter Squadron, nicknamed the Makos, is part of the Air Force Reserve Command's 482d Fighter Wing at Homestead Air Reserve Base, Florida. Originally formed in June 1943 as the 93d Troop Carrier Squadron, the squadron participated on the Western Front flying Douglas C-47 Skytrains dropping paratroopers and releasing gliders during Operation Overlord, Operation Market Garden and the Siege of Bastogne before being inactivated in June 1946. The Makos were reactivated as a reserve squadron in June 1949, which they continue to be as of 2019. Between 1949 and 1989, the squadron flew a variety of types such as the Curtiss C-46 Commando, Lockheed F-80 Shooting Star and McDonnell Douglas F-4D Phantom II. Since 1995, the Makos have flown the General Dynamics F-16C/D Fighting Falcon, in which they have conducted air superiority missions over Iraq as part of Operation Northern Watch and Operation Iraqi Freedom.

== History ==
=== World War II ===
The squadron was initially activated on 1 June 1943 under I Troop Carrier Command and equipped with Douglas C-47 Skytrains as the 93d Troop Carrier Squadron. It trained in various parts of the eastern United States until the end of 1943 when it was deployed to the United Kingdom and assigned to IX Troop Carrier Command.

Prepared for the invasion of Nazi-occupied Europe. Began operations by dropping paratroops of the 101st Airborne Division in Normandy on D-Day (6 June 1944) and releasing gliders with reinforcements on the following day. The unit received a Distinguished Unit Citation and a French citation for these missions. After the Normandy invasion the squadron ferried supplies in the United Kingdom.

After moving to France in September, the unit dropped paratroops of the 82nd Airborne Division near Nijmegen and towed gliders carrying reinforcements during the airborne attack on the Netherlands. In December, it participated in the Battle of the Bulge by releasing gliders with supplies for the 101st Airborne Division near Bastogne.

When the Allies made the air assault across the Rhine River in March 1945, each aircraft towed two gliders with troops of the 17th Airborne Division and released them near Wesel. The squadron also hauled food, clothing, medicine, gasoline, ordnance equipment, and other supplies to the front lines and evacuated patients to rear zone hospitals. It converted from C-47s to C-46s and the new aircraft to transport displaced persons from Germany to France and Belgium after V-E Day.

Returned to the U.S. during the period July–September 1945, and trained with Curtiss C-46 Commando aircraft until inactivated.

=== Air Force Reserve ===
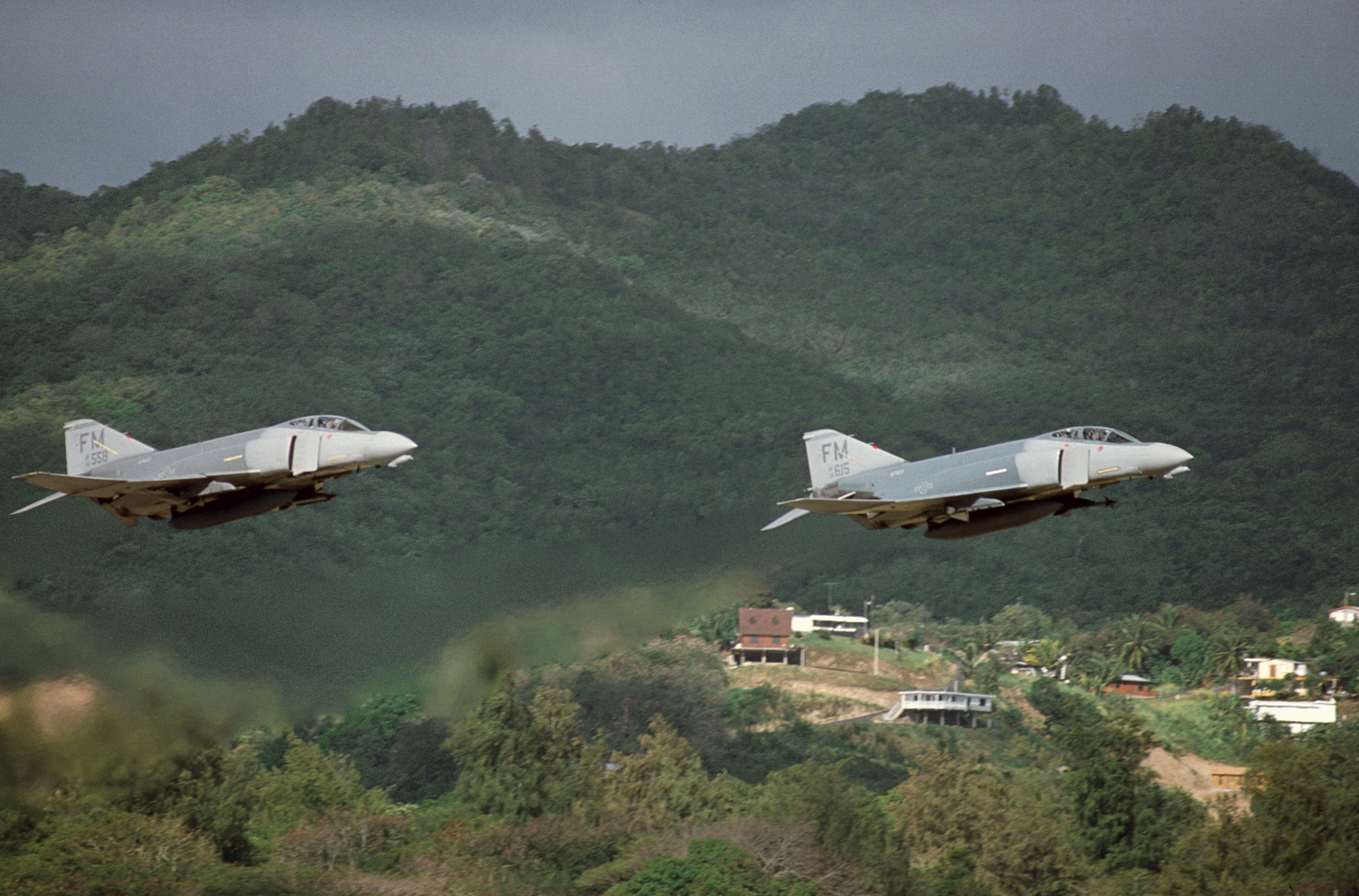
93d TFS F-4D Phantom IIs taking off from Roosevelt Roads during Exercise Patriot Pearl, 1988.

The squadron was reactivated as part of Air Force Reserve Command (AFRC) at Selfridge Air Force Base, Michigan, on 27 June 1949. From here they once again operated the C-46 Commando, training in troop carrier operations up until 3 April 1951. The squadron was reactivated as the 93d Fighter-Bomber Squadron on 15 June 1952, equipped with the North American F-51 Mustang. These were operated for only a year until the unit converted to their first jet – Lockheed F-80 Shooting Star, which was operated up until 1956. Converting to the Republic F-84 Thunderjet, the squadron continued fighter-bomber operations up until 16 November 1957 when they were inactivated.

After lying dormant for almost 21 years, the unit was reactivated at Homestead Air Force Base, Florida, as the 93d Tactical Fighter Squadron on 1 October 1978. Initially assigned to the 915th Tactical Fighter Group, the Makos were equipped with the McDonnell Douglas F-4C Phantom II. On 1 April 1981, the 93d TFS were reassigned to the 482d Tactical Fighter Wing. Between 9 and 22 August 1980, the Makos deployed 12 F-4Cs to Bodø Main Air Station, Norway, as part of Exercise Coronet Mil. The squadron converted to the F-4D Phantom II in 1983, continuing to maintain combat readiness in tactical fighter operations. The 93d TFS participated in Exercise Patriot Pearl at Roosevelt Roads Naval Station, Puerto Rico in 1988.

The Makos began to convert to the General Dynamics F-16A/B Fighting Falcon in November 1989. The squadron was re-designated as the 93d Fighter Squadron on 1 February 1992, the designation it holds to this day. The 93rd FS deployed eight F-16As to Aviano AFB, Italy, between 16 August and 12 September 1992. On 24 August 1992, Homestead Air Force Base was hit by Hurricane Andrew, a Category 5 storm, heavily damaging the base. The 93d FS evacuated the base and briefly operated from Wright-Patterson Air Force Base, Ohio, between September and December 1992 before relocating to MacDill Air Force Base, Florida, in February 1993 where the Makos remained until March 1994. The 93d FS finally returned home on 1 April 1994, when Homestead was reopened as Homestead Air Reserve Base. The Makos deployed eight F-16As to Karup Air Base, Denmark, between 5 and 18 June 1994 as part of Exercise Central Enterprise. The squadron converted over to the F-16C/D Fighting Falcon in 1995, with most of their old F-16A/B aircraft being retired to AMARC.

The 93d FS were deployed to Incirlik Air Base, Turkey, to enforce the no-fly zone over northern Iraq as part of Operation Northern Watch in 1997, 1999 and 2000. They later deployed to Ahmad al-Jaber Air Base, Kuwait, in 2001 as part of Operation Southern Watch. The squadron participated in Operation Iraqi Freedom when they were deployed alongside the 457th Fighter Squadron to Balad Air Base, Iraq, in 2007 and later in 2009. They then supported a Theater Support Program deployment to South Korea with 12 F-16C+ Block 30s in 2012 for 90+ days. In 2014 they deployed 9 F-16C+s alongside their sister squadron 457th FS 9 F-16C+s to Bagram Airfield, Afghanistan (BAF) for 180 days. In 2016 they deployed 12 F-16C+s back to BAF for 100+ day deployment. Most recently the 93rd Expeditionary Fighter Squadron deployed 12 F-16C+s to BAF in 2021 for 4 months and then extended and supported the final crewed fighter presence over Afghanistan from an undisclosed location in the Middle East being some of the last fighter pilots to fly over Afghanistan while supporting the pullout effort.

The 93rd FS participated in Exercise Iniohos at Andravida Air Base, Greece, between 27 March and 6 April 2017. While deployed they operated alongside the Hellenic, Israeli, Italian and the United Arab Emirates Air Forces.

The Makos deployed 12 F-16Cs to RAF Lakenheath, Suffolk, in the United Kingdom between 5–21 May 2019 where they carried out dissimilar air combat training with F-15E Strike Eagles of the 492nd Fighter Squadron and RAF Typhoons. Across the two-week deployment, the 93rd FS flew more than 180 hours across over 136 sorties.

== Lineage ==
- Constituted as the 93d Troop Carrier Squadron on 14 May 1943

Activated on 1 June 1943
Inactivated on 10 June 1946

- Redesignated 93d Troop Carrier Squadron, Medium on 19 May 1949
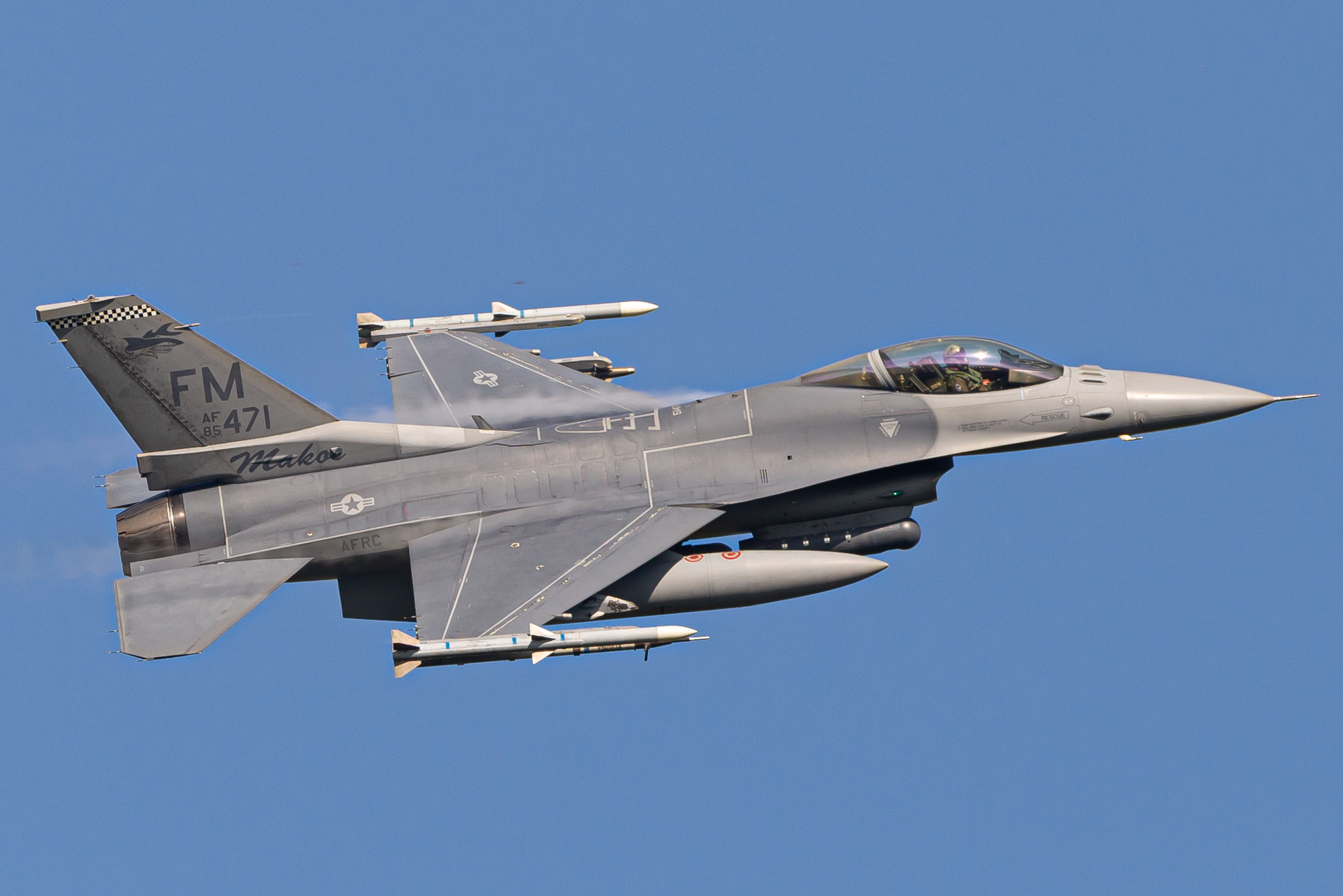
  F-16C with registration 85-1471 departing for a two-ship sortie to Avon Park Range

Activated in the reserve on 27 June 1949
Ordered to active service on 1 April 1951
Inactivated on 3 April 1951

- Redesignated 93d Fighter-Bomber Squadron on 26 May 1952

Activated in the reserve on 15 June 1952
Inactivated on 16 November 1957

- Redesignated 93d Tactical Fighter Squadron on 23 February 1978

Activated in the Reserve on 1 October 1978
Redesignated 93d Fighter Squadron on 1 February 1992

=== Assignments ===
- 439th Troop Carrier Group, 1 June 1943 – 10 June 1946
- 439th Troop Carrier Group, 27 June 1949 – 3 April 1951
- 439th Fighter-Bomber Group, 15 June 1952 – 16 November 1957
- 915th Tactical Fighter Group, 1 October 1978
- 482d Tactical Fighter Wing (later 482d Fighter Wing), 1 April 1981
- 482d Operations Group, 1 August 1992 – present

=== Stations ===
- Alliance Army Air Field, Nebraska, 1 June 1943
- Sedalia Army Air Field, Missouri, 15 June 1943
- Alliance Army Air Field, Nebraska, 2 August 1943
- Laurinburg-Maxton Army Air Base, North Carolina, 19 December 1943
- Baer Field, Indiana, 1–12 February 1944
- RAF Balderton (AAF-482), England, 6 March 1944
- RAF Upottery (AAF-462), England, 26 April 1944

Operated from RAF Ramsbury (AAF 469), England 7–16 August 1944, RAF Membury (AAF-466), England, 16–22 August 1944

- Juvincourt Airfield (A-68), France, 8 September 1944
- Lonray Airfield (A-45), France, 30 September 1944
- Chateaudun Airfield (A-39), France, 4 November 1944 – July 1945
- Baer Field, Indiana, 17 September 1945
- Sedalia Army Air Field, Missouri, 7 October 1945 – 10 June 1946
- Selfridge Air Force Base, Michigan, 27 June 1949 – 3 April 1951
- Selfridge Air Force Base, Michigan, 15 June 1952 – 16 November 1957
- Homestead Air Force Base (later Homestead Air Reserve Base), Florida, 1 Oct 1978 – present

Operated from Wright-Patterson Air Force Base, Ohio September–Dec 1992, MacDill Air Force Base, Florida, February 1993 – March 1994

=== Aircraft ===
- Douglas C-47 Skytrain (1943–1945)
- Curtiss C-46 Commando (1945–1946; 1949–1951)
- North American F-51 Mustang (1952–1953)
- Lockheed F-80 Shooting Star (1953–1956)
- Republic F-84 Thunderjet (1956–1957)
- McDonnell Douglas F-4C Phantom II (1978–1983)
- McDonnell Douglas F-4D Phantom II (1983–1989)
- General Dynamics F-16A/B Fighting Falcon (1989–1995)
- General Dynamics F-16C/D Fighting Falcon (1995–present)
