= RAF Bardney =

Former Royal Air Force station in Lincolnshire, England

RAF Bardney
- Near Bardney, Lincolnshire in England
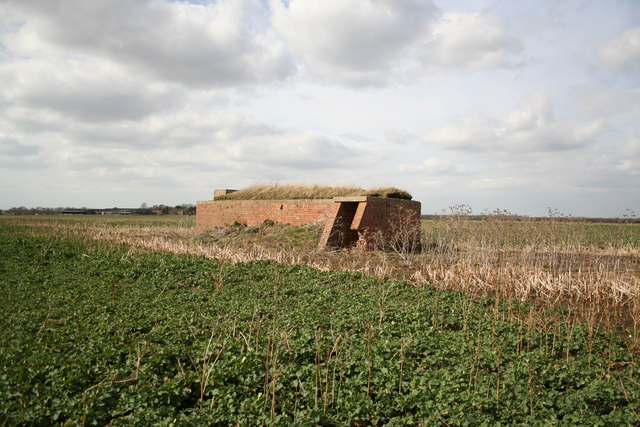
- A wartime building on the airfield

Site information
- Type: Royal Air Force station
- Code: BA
- Owner: Ministry of Defence
- Operator: Royal Air Force
- Controlled by: RAF Bomber Command * No. 5 Group RAF

Location
- Shown within Lincolnshire RAF Bardney (the United Kingdom)
- Coordinates: 53°13′31″N 000°17′31″W

Site history
- Built: 1942/43
- In use: April 1943 - 1963
- Battles/wars: European theatre of World War II; Cold War

Airfield information
- Elevation: 40 feet (12 m) AMSL
Runways
Direction	Length and surface
00/00	Concrete
00/00	Concrete
00/00	Concrete

Royal Air Force Bardney or RAF Bardney is a former Royal Air Force station located 2 miles (3.2 km) north of Bardney, Lincolnshire, England and 10 miles (16 km) east of Lincoln. It was built as a satellite to RAF Waddington in 1943 and the airfield closed in 1963.

It was one of the many bomber bases built in Lincolnshire and was built to the standard design of three concrete runways. All the facilities were widely dispersed. The tower was built on the south-eastern perimeter, not very far from a minor road. Scotgrove drain runs at the south end of the airfield. The airfield was bordered by woods on three of its sides.

== History ==
=== Second World War ===
- Opened on 13 April 1943 as home to No. 9 Squadron.
- October 1944, No. 227 Squadron formed at Bardney before moving to RAF Balderton.
- November 1944, No. 189 Squadron formed at Bardney.
- 7 July 1945, No. 9 Squadron departs and the airfield is closed.

=== Cold War ===
- 1945 onwards, site is used by the British Army for vehicle storage.
- From 1959 to 1963, No. 106 Squadron operates as a PGM-17 Thor unit here.

The Bomber Command Film Flight Unit was formed here on 10 March 1945, before moving to RAF Fulbeck on 8 April 1945.

== Current use ==
The control tower is currently being used by the Bardney Flyers Model Club, a model aircraft flying club. The former RAF station's hangars have been turned into warehouses.
