= 92nd Division =

92nd Division may refer to:

== Infantry divisions ==
- 92nd Infantry Division (German Empire)
- 92nd Infantry Division (Wehrmacht), Germany
- 92nd Guards Rifle Division, Soviet Union
- 92nd Motor Rifle Division, Soviet Union
- 92nd Infantry Division (United States)

== Armoured divisions ==
- 92nd Armored Division, Iranian Army

== See also ==
- List of military divisions by number
- 92nd Brigade (disambiguation)
- 92nd Regiment (disambiguation)
- 92nd Squadron (disambiguation)
