= 471st Tactical Electronic Warfare Training Squadron =

- Active: 1943–1945; 1954–1957
- Country: United States
- Branch: United States Air Force
- Role: Electronic warfare
- Engagements: China Burma India Theater

The 471st Tactical Electronic Warfare Squadron is an inactive unit of the United States Air Force. It was formed in 1985 by the consolidation of the World War II 71st Liaison Squadron and the Cold War era 471st Fighter-Bomber Squadron of the Air Force Reserve.

== History ==
=== World War II ===
The first predecessor of the squadron was the 71st Liaison Squadron, which was activated overseas at Ondal, India in June 1943. The squadron served in India, Burma and China until the end of the war. It was inactivated in India in December 1945.

=== Cold War ===
The 471st Fighter-Bomber Squadron was activated at Selfridge Air Force Base, Michigan in April 1954. It trained with Republic F-84 Thunderjets until 1957, when its parent 439th Fighter-Bomber Group converted to a troop carrier unit.

In September 1985 the 71st Liaison Squadron and the 471st Fighter-Bomber Squadron were consolidated as the 471st Tactical Electronic Warfare Training Squadron.

== Lineage ==
71st Liaison Squadron

- Constituted as the 71st Liaison Squadron on 17 June 1943

Activated on 15 July 1943

- Inactivated on 8 December 1945
- Consolidated on 19 September 1985 with the 471st Fighter-Bomber Squadron as the 471st Tactical Electronic Warfare Training Squadron

471st Tactical Electronic Warfare Squadron

- Constituted as the 471st Fighter-Bomber Squadron

Activated on 1 April 1954
Inactivated on 1 July 1957

- Consolidated on 19 September 1985 with the 71st Liaison Squadron as the 471st Tactical Electronic Warfare Training Squadron

=== Assignments ===
- Tenth Air Force: 15 July 1943
- United States Army Forces, China-Burma-India: 19 August 1943 (attached to 5903d Combat Troops (later 5903d Area Command, Northern Combat Area Command) from c. Oct 1943
- Army Air Forces, India-Burma Sector: 2 March 1944 (remained attached to Northern Combat Area Command)

Detachment attached to Y Force: November 1943 – c. 1 July 1944

- Tenth Air Force: 21 August 1944 (attached to 1st Liaison Group (Provisional) 19 August 1944 – 30 April 1945)
- Fourteenth Air Force: 6 July 1945 (attached to 14th AF Tactical Air Command 24 July 1945 – 1 August 1945)
- Tenth Air Force: 1 August 1945 – 8 December 1945
- 439th Fighter-Bomber Group: 1 April 1954 – 1 July 1957

=== Stations ===
- Ondal, India, 15 July 1943
- Ramgarh, Bengal, India, 17 July 1943 (detachment at Ledo, Assam, India after 18 September 1943)
- Ledo, Assam, India, 26 October 1943 (detachment at Kunming Airfield, China November 1943 – c. 1 July 1944)
- Sahmaw Airfield, Burma, 15 October 1944
- Katha, Burma, 16 January 1945
- Myitkyina Airfield, Burma, 22 March 1945
- Dinjan Airfield, Assam, India, c. 24 April 1945 (air echelon remained at Myitkyina Airfield)
- Piardoba Airfield, Bengal, India, 12 May 1945 – 10 July 1945
- Kunming Airfield, China, 25 July 1945
- Liuchow Airfield, China, 21 August 1945
- Chihchiang Airfield, China, c. 7 October 1945
- Kunming Airfield, China, October 1945
- Salua Army Air Base, Bengal, India, 4 November 1945 – 8 December 1945
- Selfridge Air Force Base, Michigan, 1 April 1954 – 1 July 1957

=== Aircraft ===
- Stinson L-1 (O-49) Vigilant (1944–45)
- Piper L-4 Cub (1943–45)
- Stinson L-5 Sentinel (1944–45)
- Noorduyn UC-64 Norseman (1944–45)
- Republic F-84 Thunderjet (1954–57)

=== Campaigns ===
Campaign streamer	Campaign	Dates	Notes
	India-Burma	15 July 1943 – 28 January 1945	71st Liaison Squadron
	China Defensive	15 July-4 May 1945	71st Liaison Squadron
	Central Burma	29 January 1945 – 15 July 1945	71st Liaison Squadron
	China Offensive	5 May 1945 – 2 September 1945	71st Liaison Squadron

== See also ==
- List of MAJCOM wings of the United States Air Force
