= VPB-112 =

Patrol Bombing Squadron 112
- Active: 8 August 1943 – 1 September 1945
- Country: United States of America
- Branch: United States Navy
- Type: squadron
- Role: Maritime patrol
- Engagements: World War II

Aircraft flown
- Patrol: PB4Y-1; PB4Y-2

VPB-112 was a Patrol Bombing Squadron of the U.S. Navy. The squadron was established as Bombing Squadron 112 (VB-112) on 8 August 1943, redesignated Patrol Bombing Squadron 112 (VPB-112) on 1 October 1944 and disestablished on 1 September 1945.

== Operational history ==
- 8 August – 2 November 1943: VB-112 was established at NAS Norfolk, Virginia, under the operational control of FAW-5, as a heavy bombing squadron flying the PB4Y-1 Liberator. Personnel were given ground and flight training at NAAS Oceana, Virginia, through the end of September. The squadron's first PB4Y-1 arrived on 2 October, with nine more arriving by 7 October. On 10 October flight crews were sent to NAS Quonset Point, Rhode Island, for advanced Anti-submarine warfare (ASW) training. The crews returned to NAS Norfolk on 2 November.
- 5 November 1943: Orders were received to proceed to NAS Port Lyautey, French Morocco, via Morrison Field, Florida, Borinquen Field, Puerto Rico, Waller Field, Trinidad; Belém and NAF Natal, Brazil and Dakar. The squadron departed NAS Norfolk and arrived by elements at NAS Port Lyautey on 25 November, coming under the operational control of FAW-15. The squadron was based at the former French airfield, Craw Field, with VPB-111, which had arrived two weeks earlier. The two squadrons were replacing an Army unit, the 472nd Bombardment Group. Patrols commenced immediately. Armor was stripped from the aircraft since the threat from enemy aircraft in the assigned patrol zones was judged minimal. The lessening of weight also made full-combat load takeoffs less dangerous in the dry, thin air of the desert. The primary mission of the squadron was safeguarding the supply routes for the invasion forces going into Italy. To do this effectively, the ASW screen had to be established out beyond the Straits of Gibraltar and approximately 700 miles (1,100 km) west of Port Lyautey. Unfortunately, neither squadron at Port Lyautey was equipped for operations at night with the Leigh searchlight. U-boat captains during this phase of combat made few daylight runs, doing most of their travel at night.
- 30 November 1944: The squadron had its first operational losses when Lieutenant R. L. Trum crashed after becoming lost off Faro, Portugal, during an ASW patrol. Five crew members were killed. The survivors returned to base on 10 December. A second aircraft, piloted by Lieutenant (jg) John M. Hill, crashed on the same day 5 miles (8.0 km) northwest of NAS Port Lyautey after running out of fuel while trying to land in heavy fog. Six crew members, including the pilot, were killed in the crash.
- 2 March 1944: Three crews and one aircraft were detached and sent to FAW-7 in England, reducing the squadron complement to 10 aircraft and 15 flight crews.
- 29 April 1944: A six-aircraft detachment was sent to RAF Gibraltar. From this location aircraft only had to patrol a zone approximately 100 miles (160 km) in circumference to cover the area used by German U-boats attempting a surface transit of the straits. Two aircraft were constantly on station and in communication with surface units below. This effectively "put the cork in the bottle" and kept all U-boats out of the Mediterranean. The following months resulted in little or no activity for the squadron since the U-boat threat had been contained.
- 1 May 1944: Four more crews were detached to FAW-7 in England.
- October 1944: For the first time in months, German U-boat activity in the Mediterranean began to pick up. Very few sightings were made because a new device was being employed by U-boats, the schnorkel. This invention allowed U-boats to run submerged using their air-breathing diesel engines. Tests with the squadron's radar against a "tame" British submarine fitted with a dummy schnorkel showed that it presented an almost invisible radar target. The schnorkel threat was seen as a greater problem for the ASW efforts in the waters around Britain. Vast quantities of shipping were arriving daily in preparation for the coming invasion set for June.
- 9 January 1945: VPB-112 received orders to cease operations and prepare to transfer from NAS Port Lyautey to RAF Upottery, Devon, England. Operations began from this base on 15 February. RAF Upottery was a satellite field of RAF Dunkeswell, where VBs VPB-103, 105 and 110 were based. VPB-107 later joined VPB-112 at RAF Upottery after being transferred from NAF Natal. The airfield had been unoccupied since June 1944, and a detachment of SeaBees quickly made it habitable.
- 27 February 1945: Lieutenant O. B. Denison and crew spotted an oil slick and directed destroyer escorts to the location. Subsequent attacks by the combined force resulted in a claim for a confirmed kill, however postwar examination of German records does not indicate any U-boat losses at that locale or date.
- 9–11 May 1945: With the Surrender of Germany the U-boats still at sea began to surrender to the Allies. On 9 May U-249 surrendered to Lieutenant D. P. Housh and crew. On 10 May U-825 surrendered to Lieutenant J. A. Murch and crew. On 11 May U-516, surrendered to Lieutenant S. T. Gillmor and crew.
- 1 June 1945: VPB-112 received orders to depart England and return to the United States. Squadron assets and aircraft were turned over to HEDRON-7. On 5 June all personnel boarded the tender USS Albemarle, arriving at NAS Norfolk on 14 June. All personnel were given orders to report to NAS Seattle, Washington, to reform the squadron after 30 days of leave.
- 27 July 1945: Squadron personnel arrived at NAS Ault Field, Whidbey Island, Washington and VPB-112 began reforming in August. Conversion training to the PB4Y-2 Privateer was conducted for all hands.
- 13 August 1945: Lieutenant R. H. Barden and one other officer, a flight surgeon, were killed while he was attempting to land his crippled aircraft. Fourteen other crew members had bailed out and one of those was killed when his chute failed to open.
- 1 September 1945: With the Surrender of Japan, there was no longer a need for the squadron and it was disestablished at NAS Whidbey Island.

== Aircraft assignments ==
The squadron was assigned the following aircraft, effective on the dates shown:

- PB4Y-1 - October 1942
- PB4Y-2 - July 1945

== Home port assignments ==
The squadron was assigned to these home ports, effective on the dates shown:

- NAS Norfolk, Virginia - 8 August 1943
- NAS Port Lyautey, French Morocco - November 1943
- RAF Upottery, England - January 1945
- NAS Whidbey Island, Washington - June 1945

== See also ==
- Maritime patrol aircraft
- List of inactive United States Navy aircraft squadrons
- List of United States Navy aircraft squadrons
- List of squadrons in the Dictionary of American Naval Aviation Squadrons
- History of the United States Navy
