= 92nd Brigade =

92nd Brigade may refer to:

== China ==
- 92nd Motorized Infantry Brigade (People's Republic of China)

== Spain ==
- 92nd Mixed Brigade

== Ukraine ==
- 92nd Assault Brigade

== United Kingdom ==
- 92nd Brigade (United Kingdom)
- 92nd (Howitzer) Brigade, Royal Field Artillery, a British Army unit during World War I
- 92nd (5th London) Brigade, Royal Field Artillery, a British Army unit after World War I

== United States ==
- 92nd Military Police Brigade

== See also ==
- 92nd Division (disambiguation)
- 92nd Regiment (disambiguation)
- 92nd Squadron (disambiguation)
