= 439th Operations Group =

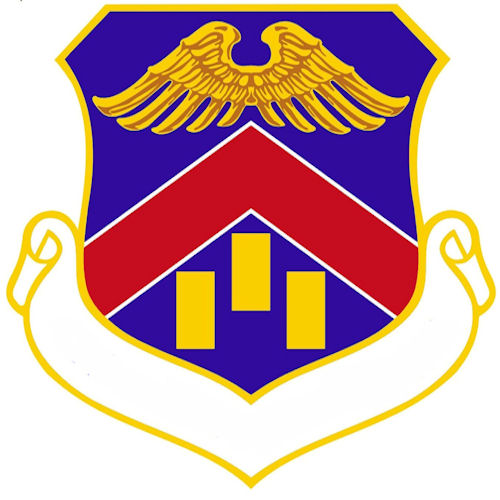
- Emblem of the 439th Operations Group
- Active: 1943–1946; 1949–1951; 1952–1957; 1965–1968; 1992—present
- Country: United States
- Branch: United States Air Force Reserve

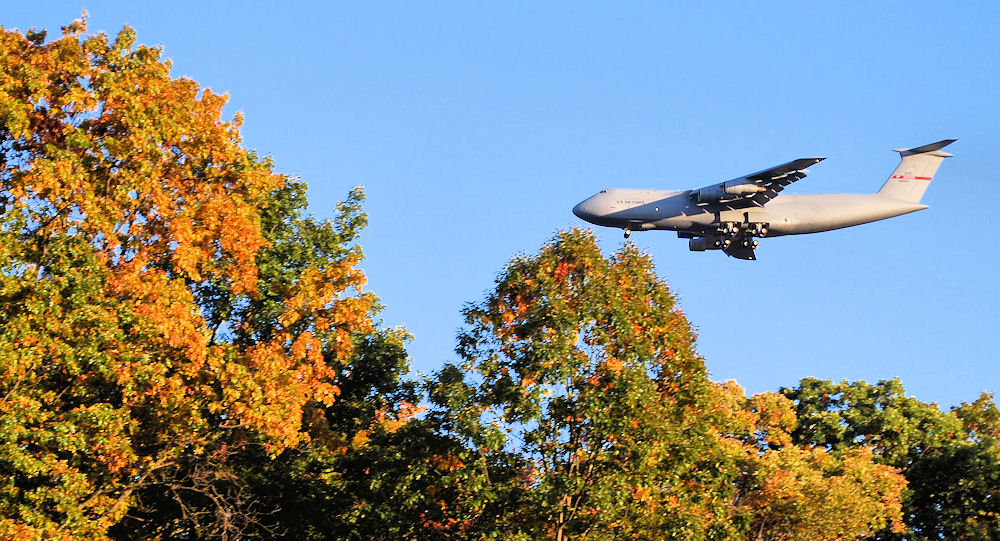
The trademark foliage of New England appears to surround a Patriot Wing C-5 preparing to land at Westover.

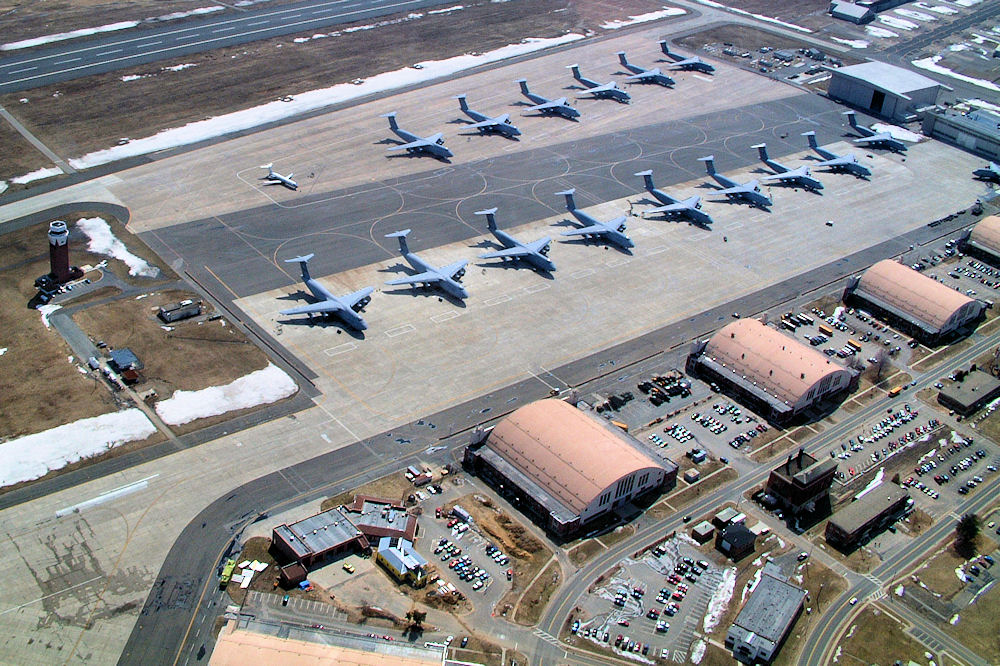
A view of Westover's flightline full of 439th OG C-5s

The 439th Operations Group is an active United States Air Force Reserve unit. It is the flying component of the Twenty-Second Air Force 439th Airlift Wing, stationed at Westover Air Reserve Base, Massachusetts.

The unit's World War II predecessor unit, the 439th Troop Carrier Group, was a C-47 Skytrain transport unit assigned to Ninth Air Force in Western Europe. During Operation Overlord, two serials of aircraft of the 439th TCG, one of 45 and the other of 36, were dispatched late in the evening of 5 June to drop the 506th Parachute Infantry Regiment during the first hour of the invasion behind Utah Beach.

Difficult weather conditions and heavy anti-aircraft fire were encountered and three aircraft failed to return. A reinforcement mission with gliders was flown on the following day, with 50 C-47s towing 30 Horsa and 20 CG-4 Wacos. The 439th later received a Distinguished Unit Citation for its work during these two days.

== Overview ==
The group operates 8 C-5M Super Galaxys, flown by the 337th Airlift Squadron. The peacetime mission includes recruiting, training, and supervision of personnel to assure mission readiness.

The 439th Operations Group can provide worldwide air movement of troops, supplies, equipment and medical patients. Airlift also involves airdrop and combat offloading operations.

== Units ==
The 439th Operations Group consists of:

- 337th Airlift Squadron - C-5M Super Galaxy
- 439th Aeromedical Evacuation Squadron
- 439th Operations Support Squadron
- 439th Contingency Response Squadron

== History ==
For additional lineage and history, see 439th Airlift Wing

=== World War II ===
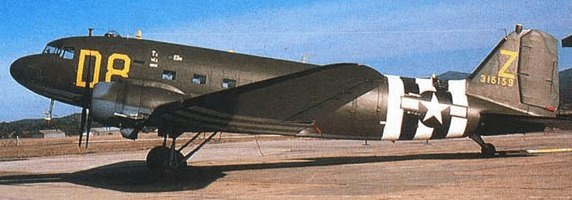
Douglas C-47A-80-DL Serial 43-15159 of the 94th Troop Carrier Squadron in Normady Invasion Markings.

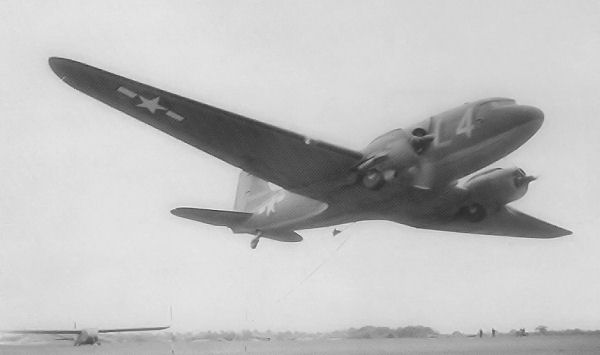
C-47s of the 91st Troop Carrier Squadron practicing the "pick up" method of towing a glider, Upottery, May 1944.

Trained in the U.S. with C-47s, 1943-Jan1944. Moved to England, February–March 1944, for duty with Ninth Air Force.

The group began operations by dropping paratroops of the 101st Airborne Division in Normandy on D-Day (6 June 1944) and releasing gliders with reinforcements on the following day. The group received a Distinguished Unit Citation and a French citation for these missions. After the Normandy invasion the group ferried supplies in the United Kingdom until the air echelon was sent to Italy in July to transport cargo to Rome and evacuate wounded personnel. The detachment dropped paratroops of the 517th Parachute Infantry Regiment along the Riviera in support of the invasion of Southern France on 15 August, and later towed gliders to provide reinforcements; for these missions the group earned another citation from the French government. After the air echelon returned to England on 25 August the group resumed its cargo missions.

After moving to France in September, the group dropped paratroops of the 82nd Airborne Division near Nijmegen and towed gliders carrying reinforcements during the airborne attack on the Netherlands. In December, it participated in the Battle of the Bulge by releasing gliders with supplies for the 101st Airborne Division near Bastogne. When the Allies made the air assault across the Rhine River in March 1945, each aircraft of the 439th towed two gliders with troops of the 17th Airborne Division and released them near Wesel. The group also hauled food, clothing, medicine, gasoline, ordnance equipment, and other supplies to the front lines and evacuated patients to rear zone hospitals. It converted from C-47s to C-46s and the 439th used the new aircraft to transport displaced persons from Germany to France and Belgium after V-E Day.

The group returned to the U.S. during the period July–September 1945, and trained with C-46 aircraft until inactivated on 10 Jun 1946.

=== Air Force Reserve ===
From June 1949, the group trained in troop carrier operations until mobilized in April 1951, its personnel being used as fillers for USAF organizations worldwide during the Korean War.

Activated in the Reserve on 15 June 1952, the group trained in fighter-bomber operations until phased out in September 1957 when the wing adopted the Tri-Deputate organization.

On 8 January 1966 the 439th replaced the 1602d Air Transport Group at Rhein-Main AB, Germany. The group controlled assigned and attached Military Airlift Command airlift units at Rhein-Main, provided air transport and air evacuation services within and occasionally outside Europe. Earned an Air Force Outstanding Unit Award for May–June 1967 support during the Middle East crisis.

Since 1 August 1992 the group has trained for and flown global airlift operations, transporting personnel, equipment, and supplies and participating in numerous exercises.

The group received its first C-5M Super Galaxy on June 2, 2017. Marking the first of eight for the unit. On September 7, 2017 the unit's last C-5A left Westover for Davis-Monthan Air Force Base, Arizona for retirement.

== Lineage ==
- Established as 439th Troop Carrier Group on 14 May 1943

Activated on 1 June 1943
Inactivated on 10 June 1946

- Redesignated 439th Troop Carrier Group, Medium on 19 May 1949

Activated in the Reserve on 27 June 1949
Ordered to active service on 1 April 1951
Inactivated on 3 April 1951

- Redesignated 439th Fighter-Bomber Group on 26 May 1952

Activated in the Reserve on 15 June 1952
Inactivated on 16 November 1957

- Redesignated 439th Military Airlift Group and activated on 27 December 1965 (not organized)

Organized on 8 January 1966
Inactivated on 24 December 1968

- Redesignated 439th Operations Group and activated in the Reserve, on 1 August 1992.

=== Assignments ===
- I Troop Carrier Command, 1 June 1943
- Ninth Air Force, c. 10 March 1944
- IX Troop Carrier Command, 26 August 1944
- I Troop Carrier Command, September 1945
- IX Troop Carrier Command, c. December 1945
- Tactical Air Command, 21 March 1946
- Third Air Force, unknown 1946-10 June 1946
- 439th Troop Carrier Wing, 27 June 1949 – 3 April 1951
- 439th Fighter-Bomber Wing, 15 June 1952 – 16 November 1957
- Military Air Transport Service, 27 December 1965 (not organized)
- 322d Air Division, 8 January 1966 – 24 December 1968
- 439th Airlift Wing, 1 August 1992–present

=== Components ===
Group

- 52d Military Airlift Group: attached 8 January 1966 – 24 December 1968

Squadrons

- 55th Military Airlift Squadron: 8 January 1966 – 24 December 1968
- 58th Aerial Port Squadron: 1 August 1992 – 1 October 2002
- 74th Aeromedical Evacuation Squadron: 1 August 1992 – 1 October 1994
- 85th Aerial Port Squadron: 1 August 1992 – 1 January 1995
- 91st Troop Carrier (later Fighter-Bomber) Squadron (L4): 1 June 1943 – 10 June 1946; 27 June 1949 – 3 April 1951; 15 June 1952 – 1 April 1954
- 92d Troop Carrier (later Fighter-Bomber) Squadron (J8): 1 June 1943 – 10 June 1946; 27 June 1949 – 3 April 1951; 15 June 1952 – 1 April 1954
- 93d Troop Carrier Squadron (3B): 1 June 1943 – 10 June 1946; 27 June 1949 – 3 April 1951; 15 June 1952 – 16 November 1957
- 94th Troop Carrier Squadron (D8): 1 June 1943 – 10 June 1946; 27 June 1949 – 3 April 1951
- 337th Airlift Squadron: 1 August 1992–present
- 439th Aeromedical Evacuation Squadron: 1 October 1994 – present
- 439th Air Terminal Squadron (later 439th Aerial Port Squadron): 8 January 1966 – 24 December 1968
- 439th Materiel Squadron: 8 January 1966 – 24 December 1968
- 471st Fighter-Bomber Squadron: 1 April 1954 – 1 July 1957
- 472d Fighter-Bomber Squadron: 1 April 1954 – 16 November 1957

=== Stations ===
- Alliance Army Air Field, Nebraska, 1 June 1943
- Sedalia Army Air Field, Missouri, 15 June 1943
- Alliance Army Air Field, Nebraska, 2 August 1943
- Laurinburg-Maxton Army Air Base, North Carolina 16 December 1943
- Baer Field, Indiana, 2–14 February 1944
- RAF Balderton (AAF-482), England, 10 March 1944
- RAF Upottery (AAF-462), England, 26 April 1944
- Juvincourt Airfield (A-68), France, 8 September 1944
- Lonray Airfield (A-45), France, 28 September 1944
- Chateaudun Airfield (A-39), France, 4 November 1944 – 7 September 1945
- Baer Field, Indiana, 22 September 1945
- Sedalia Army Air Field, Missouri, 7 October 1945 – 10 June 1946
- Selfridge Air Force Base, Michigan, 27 June 1949 – 3 April 1951; 15 June 1952 – 16 November 1957
- Rhein-Main Air Base, West Germany, 8 January 1966 – 24 December 1968
- Westover Air Reserve Base, Massachusetts, 1 August 1992 – present

=== Aircraft ===
- C-47 Skytrain, 1943–1945
- C-46 Commando, 1945–1946, 1952–1955
- TC-46 Commando, 1949–1951
- F-51 Mustang, 1953–1954
- T-33 Shooting Star, 1953–1954
- F-80 Shooting Star, 1953–1956
- F-84 Thunderjet, 1956–1957
- F-86 Sabre, 1957
- TC-47 Skytrain, 1957
- C-119 Flying Boxcar, 1957
- C-118 Liftmaster, 1966–1968
- C-124 Globemaster II, 1966–1968
- C-131 Samaritan, 1966–1968
- C-5 Galaxy, 1992–2017
- C-5M Super Galaxy, 2017–present
