= 92nd Regiment =

92nd Regiment or 92nd Infantry Regiment may refer to:

- 92nd (Loyals) Light Anti-Aircraft Regiment, Royal Artillery
- 92nd (Gordon Highlanders) Regiment of Foot

American Civil War regiments

- 92nd Illinois Volunteer Infantry Regiment
- 92nd Illinois Volunteer Mounted Infantry Regiment

== See also ==
- 92nd Division (disambiguation)
- 92nd Brigade (disambiguation)
- 92nd Squadron (disambiguation)
