= 92 =

92 may refer to:

- 92 (number), the natural number following 91 and preceding 93
- one of the years 92 BC, AD 92, 1992, 2092, etc.
- Atomic number 92: uranium
- Beretta 92, a series of semi-automatic pistols
- Saab 92, an automobile
- Tatra 92, an army off-road truck
- "92" (song) a Serbian-language song by Elena Risteska
- 92 Undina, a main-belt asteroid
- The international calling code for Pakistan

== See also ==
- 92nd (disambiguation)
- List of highways numbered 92
