= No. 227 Squadron RAF =

- Active: 1 April 1918 – 9 December 1918; 1 July 1942 – 7 September 1942; 20 August 1942 – 5 September 1945
- Country: United Kingdom
- Branch: Royal Air Force
- Motto: None

Insignia
- Squadron Badge: None
- Squadron Codes: 9J (Oct 1944 - Sep 1945)

No. 227 Squadron RAF was a Royal Air Force Squadron that formed as bomber unit in World War I and World War II.

== History ==
=== Formation and World War I ===
No. 227 Squadron was formed on 1 April 1918 as a day bomber unit and operated former RNAS Capronis from Pizzone, Italy, but it did not become operational and it disbanded on 9 December 1918.

=== Reformation in World War II ===
227 squadron was formed in Dec 1941. Personal sailed from Glagow in the ss. Viceroy of India on 4 January 1942 in convoy. The convoy was attacked by submarines in the North Atlantic about 11 January. One of the Castle ships was hit and left for the Azores. After four weeks the first port of call was Freetown. The next port of call was Durban. The entire personnel marched through Durban to the Town Hall where a Scotsman from 221 sang to the crowd after speeches by local dignitaries. After four days the convoy split. Some ships headed for the Far Easf. 227 squadron headed North unaccompanied and anchored at Aden for about 3 days. A Russian ship was anchored nearby and entertained the crew from a distance with some Russian songs. The Viceroy docked at Suez on 4 March. 227 disembarked and camped in tents at RAF. Kasfareet. Personal were employed attached to the MU assembling aircraft in temperatures that reached 129 degrees F.

After a few weeks 227 equipped with about 16 Beaufighters moved to RAF Gianakalas in the Western Desert and went straight into action against Rommel's advance under its CO, Squadron Leader O'Reilly.....he was an Irishman known Mad Mick. Within a few weeks after heavy losses of aircraft, personnel were evacuated in lorry convoy to Palestine camping at RAF Aqir awaiting the arrival of some Halifax. Bombers from the UK (No 10 and No 76 squadron). Of the 17 taking off from East Anglia only about 10 arrived - all too late to take part in the intended relief of Malta.

Bombers of 10 Squadron pending the arrival of Bristol Beaufighters. The squadron merged with 76 Squadron and 462 Squadron. On 20 August 1942, Beaufighters at Luqa, Malta were named 227 Squadron and the unit then moved to Egypt, Libya and Italy. On 12 August 1944, it was renumbered 19 Squadron, South African Air Force. It reformed again at RAF Bardney on 7 October 1944 and flew Lancasters against Germany. No. 227 Squadron was based at RAF Balderton, Nottinghamshire with Avro Lancasters between October 1944 - April 1945. 227 Squadron moved to RAF Strubby, Lincolnshire on 5 April 1945, then in June to RAF Graveley, where it was finally disbanded on 5 September.

=== Aircraft operated ===
Aircraft operated by No. 227 Squadron RAF
From	To	Aircraft	Variant
Apr 1918	Apr 1918	Caproni Ca 42	
Apr 1918	Dec 1918	Airco DH.4	
Jun 1918	Dec 1918	Airco DH.9	
Aug 1942	Feb 1943	Bristol Beaufighter	IC
Aug 1942	Aug 1944	Bristol Beaufighter	VIC
Sep 1943	Aug 1944	Bristol Beaufighter	XI
Oct 1943	Dec 1943	Bristol Beaufighter	X
Oct 1944	Sep 1945	Avro Lancaster	I & III
