= VF-92 =

VF-92 may refer to:

- VF-74, a United States Navy fighter squadron which was designated VF-92 from 1948 to 1951 before becoming VF-74
- VF-92 (1952–1975), United States Navy fighter squadron active from 1952 to 1974
