= 92 Squadron =

92 Squadron or 92nd Squadron may refer to:

- No. 92 Squadron RAF, a unit of the United Kingdom Royal Air Force
- No. 92 Squadron RAAF, a unit of the Royal Australian Air Force
- 92d Aero Squadron, a unit of the United States Army Air Service
- 92nd Air Refueling Squadron, a unit of the United States Air Force
- 92nd Cyberspace Operations Squadron, a unit of the United States Air Force
- 92d Fighter Squadron, later 92d Fighter-Interceptor Squadron and 92d Tactical Fighter Squadron, a unit of the United States Army Air Forces / United States Air Force
- 92nd Fighter-Bomber Squadron, a unit of the United States Air Force
- 92d Troop Carrier Squadron, a unit of the United States Army Air Forces
- VF-92 (disambiguation), units of the United States Navy
- VP-92 (Patrol Squadron 92), a unit of the United States Navy
- VPB-92 (Patrol Bombing Squadron 92), a unit of the United States Navy
