= Orbetello Airfield =

Abandoned airfield in Italy

Orbetello Airfield
- Part of Twelfth Air Force
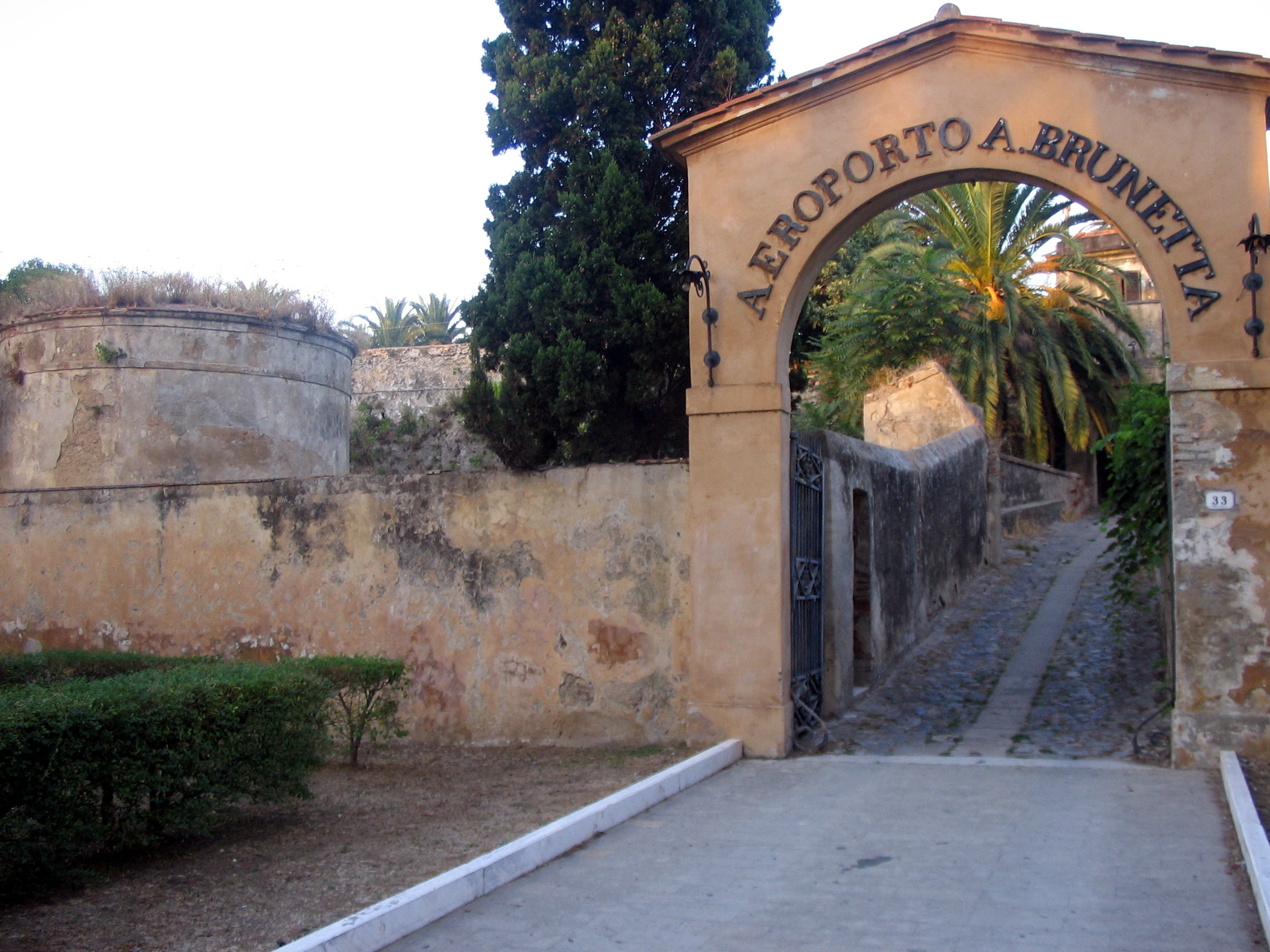

Site information
- Type: Military airfield
- Controlled by: Regia Aeronautica, United States Army Air Forces

Location
- Coordinates: 42°29′43.67″N 011°14′21.78″E

Site history
- Built: 1913
- In use: 1945

Location of Orbetello Airfield, Italy

Orbetello Airfield Agostino Brunetta, is an abandoned World War II military airfield in Central Italy, which is located approximately 5 km north-northeast of Orbetello in the province of Grosseto (Tuscany).

Built from the Regia Marina in Lagoon of Orbetello for the Italian Navy Aviation, in 1925 was transferred to Regia Aeronautica. The airfield was the main Italian seaplane base.

The minister Italo Balbo himself led some transatlantic flights from Orbetello. The most famous was the 1930 flight of twelve Savoia-Marchetti S.55 flying boats from Orbetello Airfield to Rio de Janeiro, Brazil between 17 December 1930 and 15 January 1931. From 1 July to 12 August 1933, he led a flight of twenty-four flying boats on a round-trip flight from Rome to the Century of Progress in Chicago, Illinois. The flight had seven legs; Orbetello — Amsterdam — Derry — Reykjavík — Cartwright, Labrador — Shediac — Montreal ending on Lake Michigan near Burnham Park. After it was used by the 31º Stormo.

The airfield was a former Luftwaffe base seized by the United States Army in June 1944.

After its capture, it was used by the United States Army Air Force Twelfth Air Force.

- HQ, 64th Fighter Wing, 19 June–19 July 1944
- 86th Fighter Group, 19 June–12 July 1944, P-47 Thunderbolt
- 439th Troop Carrier Group, 18 July–24 August 1944, C-47 Skytrain

According to the group historian of the 86th, the airfield was put into use by the group with the front lines just a few miles north of the field. When the first elements arrived, they found a burnt-out German half-track with numerous casualties in it, along with numerous empty German helmets scattered around. At Orbetello the 86th transitioned from the A-36 Apache to the P-47 Thunderbolt and was redesignated a Fighter Group from its former Fighter-Bomber designation. Also, the 64th Fighter Wing set up headquarters on the airfield.

As part of the invasion of southern France (Operation Dragoon), the 439th Troop Carrier Group flew three squadrons of C-47s on the base where Army paratroopers had assembled and were flown to their drop zones in southern France during the invasion.

When the Americans moved out the airfield was closed and dismantled. Today, the location of the airfield is visible in aerial photography, with its runway visible. However the remainder of the airfield has been obliterated by agricultural use of the land.
