= RAF Balderton =

Former Royal Air Force station in Nottingham, England

RAF Balderton USAAF Station AAF-482
- Balderton, Nottinghamshire in England
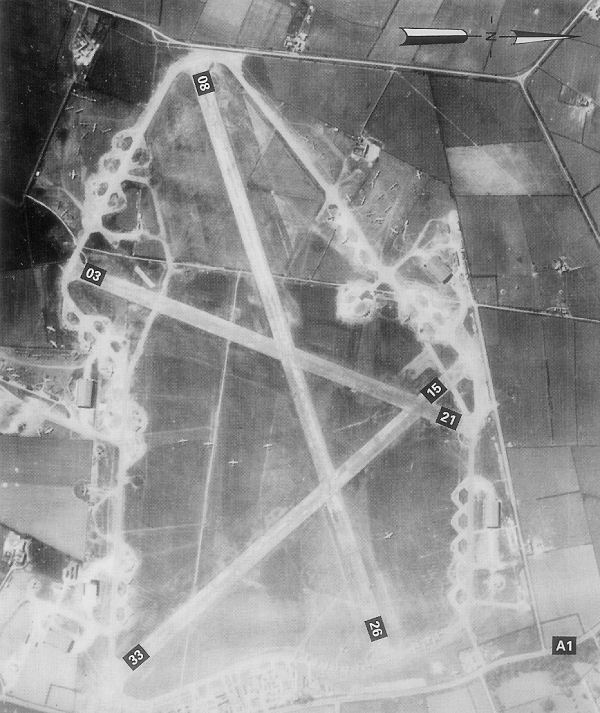
- RAF Balderton, taken 18 April 1944 oriented westward (top). As part of the buildup to D-Day, the 439th Troop Carrier Group has large numbers of C-47s and CG-4 Horsa Gliders parked on the grass interior of airfield as well as on the dispersal loops along the perimeter track.

Site information
- Type: Royal Air Force satellite station 1941-44; RAF Sub-station 1944-
- Code: BL
- Owner: Air Ministry
- Operator: Royal Air Force; United States Army Air Forces
- Controlled by: RAF Bomber Command; 1941-44 & 1944- * No. 7 (T) Group RAF * No. 5 Group RAF; Ninth Air Force; 1944

Location
- Shown within Nottinghamshire RAF Balderton (the United Kingdom)
- Coordinates: 53°02′11″N 000°47′09″W

Site history
- Built: 1940/41
- Built by: W. & C. French
- In use: June 1941 - 1954
- Battles/wars: European theatre of World War II

Airfield information
- Elevation: 20 metres (66 ft) AMSL
Runways
Direction	Length and surface
03/21	1,280 metres (4,199 ft) Asphalt
08/26	1,827 metres (5,994 ft) Asphalt
15/33	1,280 metres (4,199 ft) Asphalt

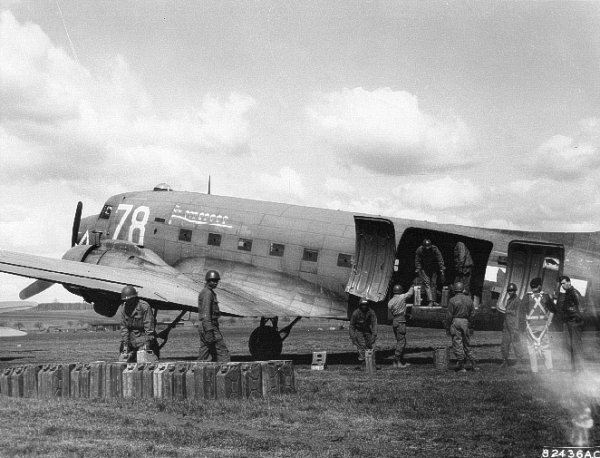
Douglas C-47A of the 84th Troop Carrier Squadron.

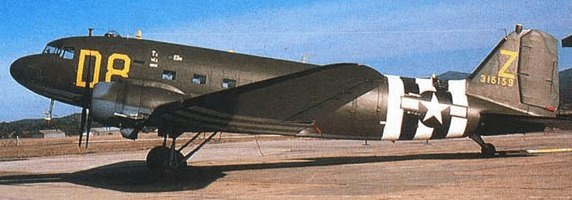
Douglas C-47A-80-DL Serial 43-15159 of the 94th Troop Carrier Squadron in Normandy Invasion Markings.

Royal Air Force Balderton or more simply RAF Balderton was a former Royal Air Force satellite station located 2.0 miles (3.2 km) south of Newark-on-Trent, sandwiched between the now extinct Great Northern Railway (GNR) Bottesford-Newark line and the A1 road in Nottinghamshire, England.

Balderton airfield opened in June 1941 with a grass surface over stiff clay. It was used by the Royal Air Force (RAF), Royal Canadian Air Force (RCAF) and United States Army Air Forces (USAAF). During the Second World War, it was used primarily as a troop carrier transport airfield and after for munitions storage before it finally closed. A notice in The Times for 20 May 1957 lists the airfield as one of those no longer needed by the RAF.

The airfield was built to a dispersed plan. By 1943 the airfield had tarmac landing areas with three intersecting runways and 50 hard standings suitable for Heavy Bombers. In 1944 it was used by Bomber Command's 5 Group. There were two T-2 aircraft hangars, two Glider hangars and one B1 type hangar by 1944. There were 1510 male and 208 female personnel stationed on the base at that time. Part of the accommodation was temporary, and the officers accommodation was at a nearby hospital, Balderton Hall, which is now part of the Fernwood development.

During the airfield's short operational life, more than two hundred aircrew failed to return and paid the ultimate sacrifice.

Today, the remains of the airfield are located on private property being used as agricultural fields and a gypsum quarry.

== History ==
=== Royal Air Force (RAF) use ===
The following units were present at some point:

- No. 1 Equipment Disposal Depot (June 1945) became No. 254 Maintenance Unit RAF (June 1945 - January 1946 & February - July 1946)
- Detachment of No. 12 (Pilots) Advanced Flying Unit RAF (December 1943 - January 1944)
- Detachment of No. 14 (Pilots) Advanced Flying Unit RAF (April 1942)
- Satellite Airfield of No. 25 Operational Training Unit RAF (June - November 1941)
- No. 28 Heavy Glider Maintenance Section of No. 2 Heavy Glider Maintenance Unit (June 1943 - March 1944)
- Sub site of No. 93 Maintenance Unit RAF (December 1948 - August 1955)
- No. 227 Squadron RAF
- Sub site of No. 255 Maintenance Unit RAF (July 1946 - November 1948)
- No. 408 Squadron RCAF
- No. 1668 Heavy Conversion Unit RAF (August - November 1943)

The airfield was assigned to No. 5 Group RAF and received No. 408 Squadron RCAF and its Handley Page Hampdens from RAF Syerston on 9 December 1941.

408 Squadron's first operational flight from RAF Balderton was on 10 December 1941, being a daylight bombing raid on the airfield at Leeuwarden.

408 Squadron remained at RAF Balderton from 9 December 1941 until 20 September 1942, with 60 operational aircraft and crews sent to RAF North Luffenham from 25 January 1942 to 16 March 1942 due to Balderton's runways becoming unserviceable.

1943 saw the laying of the concrete runways, and in August of that year, 1668 HCU was formed at RAF Balderton and stayed until moving to RAF Syerston to become No. 5 Lancaster Finishing School.

=== United States Army Air Forces (USAAF) Use ===
The airfield was officially taken over by Ninth Air Force on New Year's Day 1944. Balderton was used as a reception centre for the 437th and the 439th troop carrier groups arriving from the United States that were subsequently located at other UK airfields. Balderton was known as USAAF Station AAF-482 for security reasons by the USAAF during the war, and by which it was referred to instead of location. Its USAAF Station Code was "BD". Its World War II radio callsign was "Cheapride".

==== Operation Market-Garden ====
Balderton was retained by IX Troop Carrier Command throughout the summer of 1944, and it was about to be released to the Royal Air Force when, in September, it was required as an advance base for Operation "Market".

Ground units moved in during the first week and the air echelon of the 439th TCG, which had been in the process of moving to France, returned to Balderton to airlift the ground forces into the Netherlands.

On 17 September, the 439th despatched two flights of aircraft. The first, with 30 Douglas C-47 Skytrains carrying paratroops of the 82nd Airborne Division to Groesbeek near Nijmegen, successfully completed their mission. The 50 C-47s of the second flight towed Waco CG-4A gliders, losing one but no C-47s were lost

The next day, 50 C-47s again towed gliders to Groesbeck. one C47 was lost on 18 September 42-93098c-N12972 and Captain F O Lorimer was killed. On D-plus 2, 25 C-47s took part in an unsuccessful re-supply mission. On D-plus 3, 15 C-47s of the group carried out a re-supply drop to the 101st Airborne Division from RAF Greenham Common.

==== 437th Troop Carrier Group ====
The first USAAF transport unit to arrive was the 437th Troop Carrier Group during January 1944 from Baer Army Airfield, Indiana. The group's squadrons and fuselage codes were:

- 83d Troop Carrier Squadron (T2)
- 84th Troop Carrier Squadron (Z8)
- 85th Troop Carrier Squadron (90)
- 86th Troop Carrier Squadron (5K)

The 439th was a group of Ninth Air Force's 53d Troop Carrier Wing, IX Troop Carrier Command.

The first aircraft arrived on 21 January. On 5/6 February, it was moved south to RAF Ramsbury in Wiltshire.

==== 439th Troop Carrier Group ====
In early February 1944, the air echelon of the 439th was ordered to Baer Field, Fort Wayne, Indiana, the aerial port of embarkation, arriving there on the 14th of the month. The ground echelon would follow by ship to England. The advance parties of the 439th and two of its squadrons, the 91st and 92nd, departed Baer Field in their C47 transports o/a 19 February 1944. Flying a circuitous route they arrived at Balderton on 21 February 1944. The remaining two squadrons, the 93rd and 94th, did not arrive at Balderton until 6 March. Skidmore and the ground echelon of the 439th TC Group and its four squadrons left New York aboard the USS George Washington, an Army troop transport, on 28 February 1944. After eleven days at sea the ship arrived at Liverpool, England on 10 March 1944. From there they traveled by rail to Balderton where they would remain until 26 April 1944. On that date the group was relocated to the aerodrome at RAF Upottery, England.

The group's squadrons and fuselage codes were:

- 91st Troop Carrier Squadron (L4)
- 92d Troop Carrier Squadron (J8)
- 93d Troop Carrier Squadron (3B)
- 94th Troop Carrier Squadron (D8)

The 439th was a group of Ninth Air Force's 50th Troop Carrier Wing, IX Troop Carrier Command.

Intensive training with paratroops of the 82nd Airborne Division was conducted until the 439th was moved to RAF Upottery in Devon on 26 April, although all elements did not move until May.

=== Frank Whittle's jet engine trials at Balderton 1943–1944 ===
Jet aircraft with Rolls-Royce engines were subsequently test flown from Balderton, Nottinghamshire, during 1943–1944 (notably Whittle's Meteor and Vickers Wellington W5389/G jet engine trials) and Church Broughton, Derbyshire, where concrete runways were available.

This account taken from the book 'Men of Power: The Lives of Rolls-Royce Chief Test Pilots Harvey and Jim Heyworth.'

It includes the following details;

Jan 44 - Returned to Glosters for a complete overhaul.

24 Feb 44 - To Rolls-Royces' aerodrome at Balderton following completion of overhaul. 25-minute flight. To quote from the flight report held by DoRIS; 'due to the landing of an entire American Transport Squadron, the aircraft was flown around Balderton for a few minutes while waiting for the aerodrome to clear'.

28 Apr 44 Following tests, transferred to Church Broughton for further development flying.

Whittle is believed to have based himself at Balderton Old Hall on Main Street while working on his prototype jet engine trials at RAF Balderton.

=== Return to British control ===
RAF Balderton was returned to No. 5 Group RAF Bomber Command at the end of September 1944 and the re-formed No. 227 Squadron RAF with Avro Lancasters.

227's Squadron identification code was 9J.

227 Squadron was based at RAF Balderton between October 1944 and April 1945. The first mission they took part in while at RAF Balderton was on the night of 28 October 1944. 18 aircraft to bomb Bergen, Norway.

227 Squadron moved to RAF Strubby, Lincolnshire on 5 April 1945.

== Postwar Use ==
Having no operational usefulness to the RAF, from June 1945, bombs were stored on the runways. Like many wartime airfields, it languished unused with a little demolition until gradually disposed of in the 1950s and 1960s. A notice in The Times for 20 May 1957 listed the airfield as one of those no longer needed by the RAF. The airfield was sold by public auction on Wednesday, 9 September 1959.

RAF Balderton was then sold by the MOD and returned to agriculture, the runway concrete disappearing as hardcore under the A1 improvements of the mid-1960s. At that time, the developed A1 was routed west of the original road (The Old Great North Road), over the eastern perimeter track of the airfield, before coming back to the east to bypass Balderton village and Newark.

Gypsum open-pit mining has also taken its toll where quarrying has obliterated the western side of the airfield.

== See also ==
- List of former Royal Air Force stations
- 82nd Airborne Division
