= Châteaudun Air Base =

Châteaudun Air Base Base aérienne 279

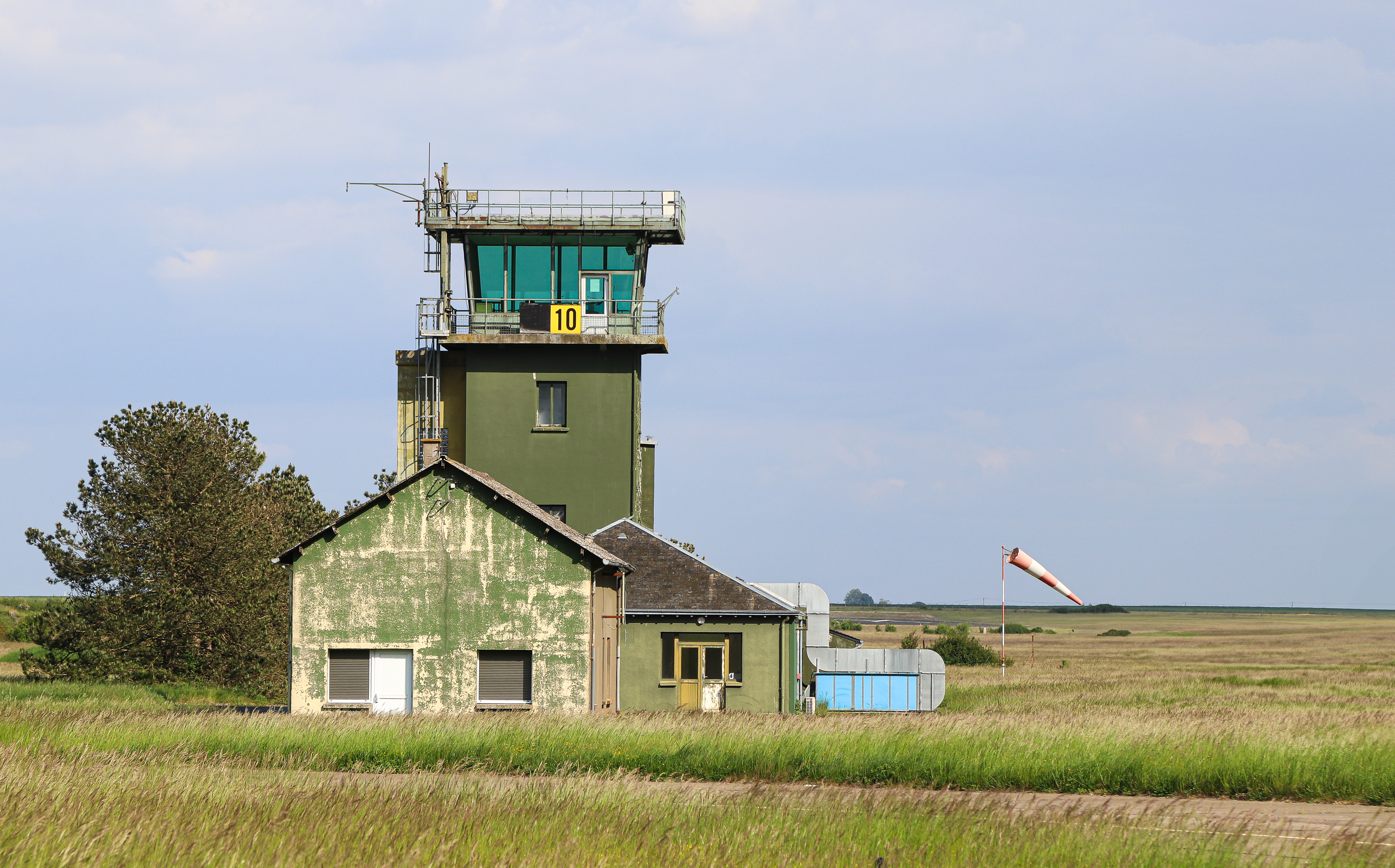
- Châteaudun Air Base ATC Tower
- IATA: none; ICAO: LFOC

Summary
- Airport type: Military
- Owner: Government of France
- Operator: Armée de l'air
- Location: Châteaudun, France
- Elevation AMSL: 433 ft (132 m)
- Coordinates: 48°03′29″N 001°22′35″E

Map
- Location of Châteaudun Air Base

Runways
Direction	Length		Surface
Direction	ft	m	Surface
10/28	7,552	2,302	Asphalt
05/23			Closed
- Source:World Aero Data

Châteaudun Air Base (French: Base aérienne 279 Châteaudun) (ICAO: LFOC) was a French Air Force (French: Armée de l'Air base, between 1934 and 2014. The base was located approximately 3.5 kilometres (2.2 mi) southeast of Châteaudun and about 112 kilometres (70 mi) southwest of Paris. It is currently an airfield attached to Orléans – Bricy Air Base.

The base is primarily used for aircraft storage and ferrying them to other squadrons of the Air Force. Entrepot de l'Armee de l'Air 601 was assigned to perform this mission. Each French Air Force squadron stores some of its planes for a while thereby artificially prolong the life of the fleet and better material management. The EAA also has the task of storing new aircraft to be used in times of war. To fulfil its mission, the EAA has the Group Maintenance, repair and storage of aircraft (GERS).

A SAN Jodel D.140 Mousquetaire training aircraft is assigned to the base for courier duties.

== History ==
The facility was a French Air Force base built in 1934. It was used by the air force for the storage of aircraft as well as a supply and maintenance depot. At the beginning of World War II, the base had 643 aircraft, which gave it great importance. It became a priority target for the Luftwaffe during the Battle of France who bombed it heavily on 12 and May 19, 1940. On June 14, against the German advance, the airfield was abandoned., after the heroic sacrifice of flight lieutenant Marcel Beau.

=== German use during World War II ===
Seized by the Germans in June 1940 during the Battle of France, Châteaudun was used as a Luftwaffe military airfield during the occupation. Under occupation, the German army, owner, undertook infrastructure projects including the construction of dispersal areas called "daisies" and the track. Chateaudun also served as a starting point for air raids on England. Known units assigned (all from Luftlotte 3, Fliegerkorps IV):

- Jagdgeschwader 21 (JG 21) 19–22 June 1940 Messerschmitt Bf 109E
- Jagdgeschwader 54 (JG 54) 19–20 June 1940 Messerschmitt Bf 109E
- Lehrgeschwader 1 (LG 1) 25 June 1940 – 10 January 1941 Junkers Ju 88A (Geschwaderkennung prefix: L1+)
- Kampfgeschwader 76 (KG 76) 6 February–April 1941 Junkers Ju 88A (Geschwaderkennung prefix: F1+)
- Kampfgeschwader 40 (KG 40) 19 December 1943-January 1944 Heinkel He 177A-3 & A-5 (Geschwaderkennung prefix: F8+)
- Kampfgeschwader 100 (KG 100) 21 January-1 May 1944 Heinkel He 177A-3 & A-5 (Geschwaderkennung prefix: 6N+)
- Nachtjagdgeschwader 2 (NJG 2) 2 July-9 August 1944 Junkers Ju 88C/G (Geschwaderkennung prefix: 4R+)
- Kampfgeschwader 51 (KG 51) 20 July-12 August 1944 Messerschmitt Me 262A-2a

JG 21 and JG 54 fought in the Battle of Britain as fighter escort units; LG 1 was a training unit; KG 76 engaged in night bombardment operations over England, along with KG 40 and KG 100 to a limited extent due to fuel shortages; NJG2 was a night interceptor unit against RAF Bombers; KG 51 flew the jet Me 262A2a on day jet interceptor missions against American heavy bomber attacks.

Largely due to the presence of the Me 262, Châteaudun became a major target of USAAF Ninth Air Force Martin B-26 Marauder medium bombers and Republic P-47 Thunderbolts mostly with 500-pound General-Purpose bombs; unguided rockets and .50 caliber machine gun sweeps to attack the German jets on the ground. It was known that the Me 262 was relatively short-legged, with a relatively short flying radius, so the attacks were timed to have the maximum effect possible on the jets to keep the jet interceptors pinned down on the ground and be unable to attack the heavy bombers. Also the P-51 Mustang fighter-escort groups of Eighth Air Force would drop down on their return to England and attack the base with a fighter sweep and attack any target of opportunity to be found at the airfield.

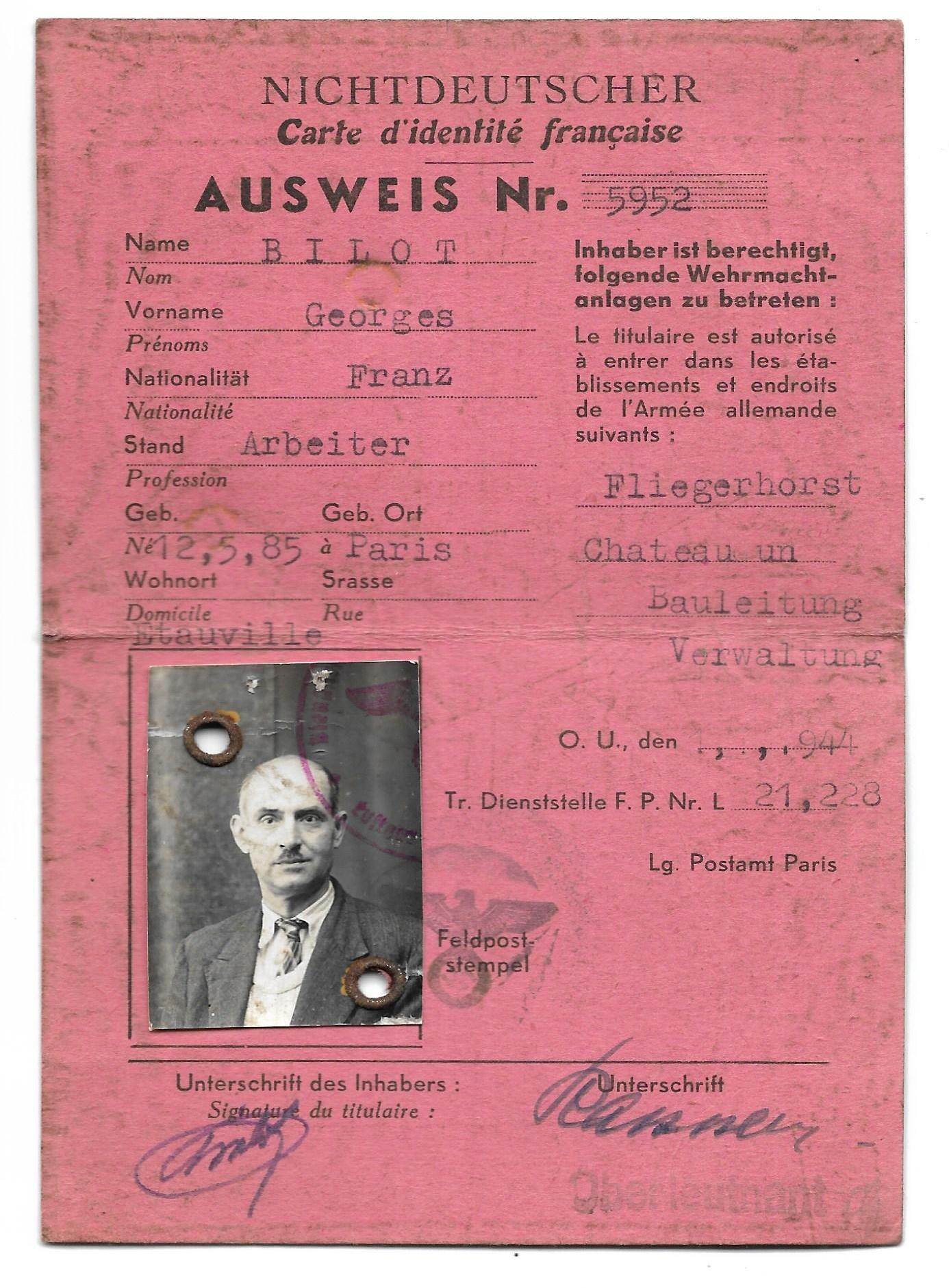
1944 German Dienst Ausweis issued to a local working at the Châteaudun Air Base.

=== American use ===
Châteaudun was heavily attacked on several missions by United States Army Air Force Eighth Air Force bombers in 1943 and 1944. It was liberated by Allied ground forces about 20 August 1944 during the Northern France Campaign. Almost immediately, the USAAF IX Engineering Command 832d and 833d Engineer Aviation Battalions began clearing the airport of mines and destroyed Luftwaffe aircraft, and repairing operational facilities for use by American aircraft. Subsequently, Châteaudun became a USAAF Ninth Air Force combat airfield, designated as "A-39" about 26 August, only a week after its capture from German forces.

Under American control, Châteaudun initially became the home of numerous combat groups. Initially, the 422d Night Fighter Squadron moved in and provided an air defense with Northop P-61 Black Widows from 28 August to 16 September 1944. The Black Widows were replaced by the Martin B-26 Marauders of the 387th Bombardment Group on 18 September, remaining until 30 October 1944. The last American combat unit to use the airfield was the 10th Reconnaissance Group, which flew a variety of photo-reconnaissance aircraft from the field during November 1944. With the combat units moving east with the front lines, Châteaudun became a transport airfield, with the 439th Troop Carrier Group flying C-47 Skytrains from the field from 4 November 1944 until 7 September 1945.

=== Return to French Air Force ===
The Americans returned control of the field to the French Air Force in September 1945 and it returned to being a French military airfield.

In 1967, during the period of tension précéding the Six-Day War, fifty Dassault Mirage 5 jets ordered by Israel were stored on the base of Chateaudun. The settlement of this dispute took place in 1971, with the aircraft being bought by the Armée de l'Air. On 13 June 1990, the base was named Lieutenant-Beau, remembering Lieutenant Marcel Beau, a pilot at Air Base 134 Versailles in 1935.

Today, the remains of World War II bomb craters are very evident in the grass areas of the airfield, as well as the abandoned 05/23 secondary runway in which the wartime patching with asphalt is still visible. On 2 July 2014, the installation was closed as an Air Force Base.

In 2014, the base was linked to Air Force base Orléans-Bricy. Element Air Reattache 279 (EAR 279) retained the mission of aircraft storage, as well as aerial activity (the field being open two days a week). The unit also operates an aircraft deconstruction center.

On 26 January 2015, the 2015 Los Llanos Air Base crash occurred. One of the nine French victims came from EAR 279.

== Units ==
The air base operated units responsible for aircraft storage and transport to French Air Force squadrons, a computer center responsible for supporting logistics applications, a technical equipment management center, a technical study team for storage methods, a technical study team for battle damage repairs, and a local purchasing and procurement section.

From July 1, 1964 to July 7, 2017, the pilots of Convoy Squadron 70 "Châteaudun" were responsible for the movement of military aircraft between various entities: Air Force units, squadrons or warehouses, aeronautical industrial workshops (AIA), and even manufacturer sites.

The base hosted virtually every type of aircraft used by the French Air Force. The Socata TBM-700 was used primarily for transport missions, following the Morane-Saulnier MS.760 Paris, MS.760 Paris.

There was a Air Military Training Center ("Air PM") there, during the conscription era, which provided future conscripts with the fundamentals of military training for assignment to an Air Force unit during their military service.

A stele commemorates the airmen of the Châteaudun Air Base, including those who died in service: Lieutenant Marcel Beau, Private Bernard Michel, Major Henri Perrot, and Second Lieutenant Barbara Rolfo.

== See also ==
- Advanced Landing Ground
