= IX Troop Carrier Command =

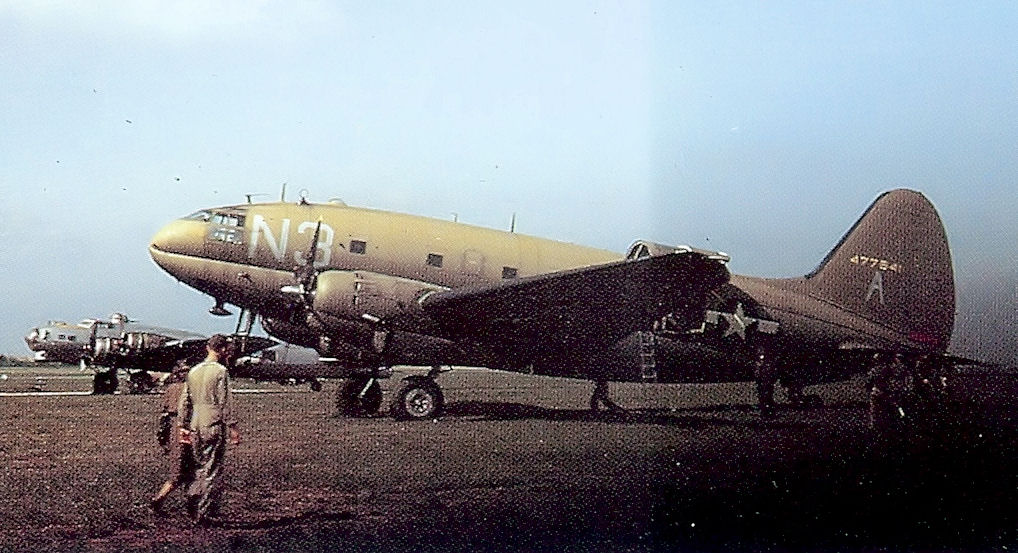
- Command C-46 Commando (Note: Aircraft is Curtiss C-46D-10-CU Commando, serial 44-77541 of the 47th Troop Carrier Squadron, 313th Troop Carrier Group.)
- Active: 1943-1946
- Country: United States
- Branch: United States Air Force
- Role: Command of troop carrier units
- Size: 14 groups, 1400 aircraft
- Engagements: Operation Neptune; Operation Market; Operation Varsity

Insignia
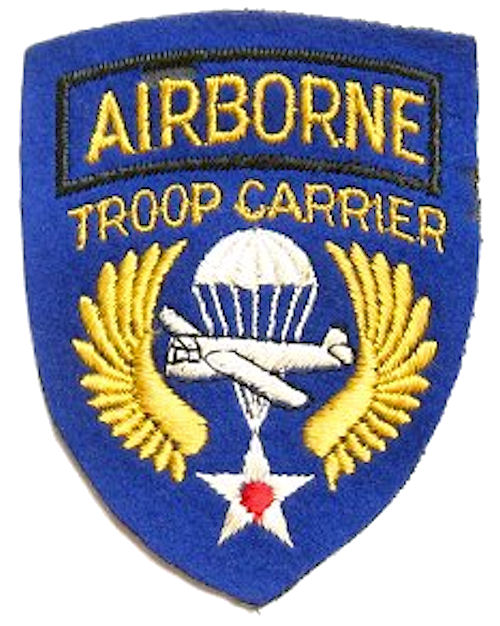
- IX Troop Carrier Command patch (Note: Unofficial. See Maurer, Combat Units, p. 449 (no approved insigne).)

The IX Troop Carrier Command was a United States Army Air Forces unit. Its last assignment was with the Ninth Air Force, based at Greenville Army Air Base, South Carolina. It was inactivated on 31 March 1946 as a component command of the Ninth Air Force, based in the United Kingdom.

== Overview ==
The mission of IX Troop Carrier Command was air transport for the Allied airborne forces in the European Theater of Operations (ETO). The main aircraft of command were the Douglas C-47 Skytrain and its variant, the Douglas C-53 Skytrooper, but in 1945 the command equipped one group with 117 Curtiss C-46 Commando aircraft to determine their viability in the RTO. As a result of a 28 percent loss rate during Operation Varsity resulting from the C-46 being prone to catching fire, The command did not convert to the Commando, even though its cargo-carrying capacity was twice that of the C-47. The command also had 1,922 CG-4A Waco and 20 Waco CG-13 gliders just prior to its last big operation in March 1945. IX Troop Carrier Command consisted of three troop carrier wings, 14 troop carrier groups, and one pathfinder group, about 1,380 operational aircraft including spares, and 2,000 gliders at its maximum strength in March 1945.

IX Troop Carrier Command conducted three multi-divisional combat air assaults

- Operation Neptune, the airborne invasion of Normandy in June 1944
- Operation Market Garden, the airborne invasion of the Netherlands in September 1944
- Operation Varsity, the airborne crossing of the Rhine River in March 1945

The command conducted relief operations for isolated units during the German counter-offensive in the Ardennes in December 1944.

== History ==
=== Background ===
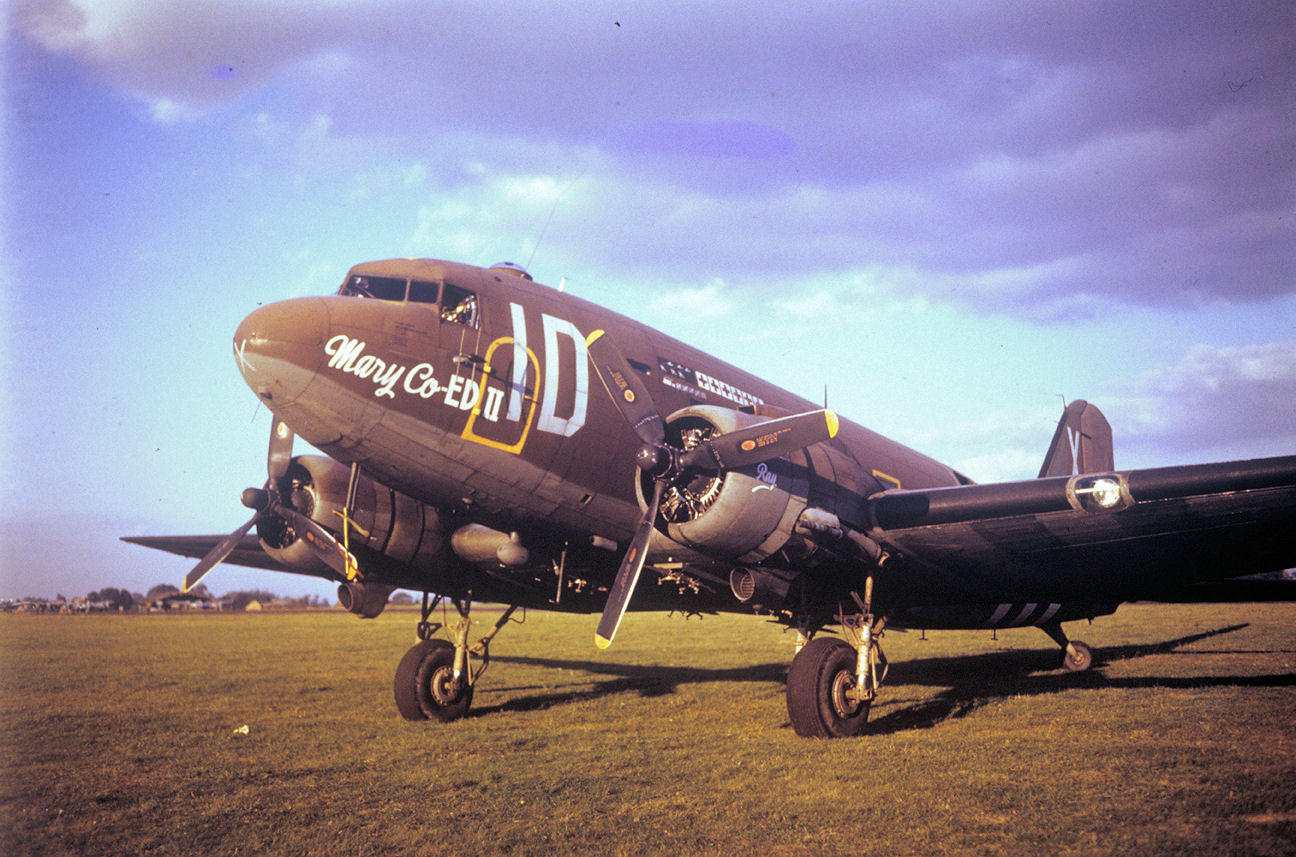
C-47 Skytrain of the 74th Troop Carrier Squadron, 434th Troop Carrier Group

All U.S. tactical air support units in Great Britain were consolidated into Ninth Air Force on 16 October 1943, under the command of Maj. Gen. Lewis H. Brereton. At the same time the IX Troop Carrier Command was activated, having been constituted by USAAF Headquarters five days before its headquarters transferred to Grantham Lodge where it remained until 20 September 1944, when it transferred to Ascot, Berkshire, its final location in Europe. Its first headquarters was located at RAF Cottesmore, where it took control of a provisional headquarters established by the Eighth Air Force in September.

The command's original cadre came from Headquarters, 1st Troop Carrier Command (Provisional) established as a provisional headquarters by the Eighth Air Force in September with six officers and three aircraft of the 315th Troop Carrier Group (the remainder of the group's aircraft and squadrons were on detached service in the Mediterranean Theater of Operations). On 1 October 1943 the 434th Troop Carrier Group became part of the provisional command and was the only group assigned. Twelve airfields were designated for the new command, each to house 40 C-47s and a like number of gliders: RAF Fulbeck, RAF Langar, RAF Bottesford, RAF Wakerley, RAF Balderton, RAF North Witham, RAF Barkston Heath, RAF Cottesmore, RAF North Luffenham, RAF Saltby, RAF Folkingham, and RAF Woolfox Lodge. In October, 1943, Brigadier General Benjamin F. Giles became commanding officer.

In November the 435th Troop Carrier Group at RAF Welford was assigned, and command headquarters were moved to Grantham Lodge. RAF Ramsbury, RAF Aldermaston, and RAF Greenham Common also became available as landing areas for tactical training with the 101st Airborne Division and later became troop carrier bases.

=== Combat operations ===
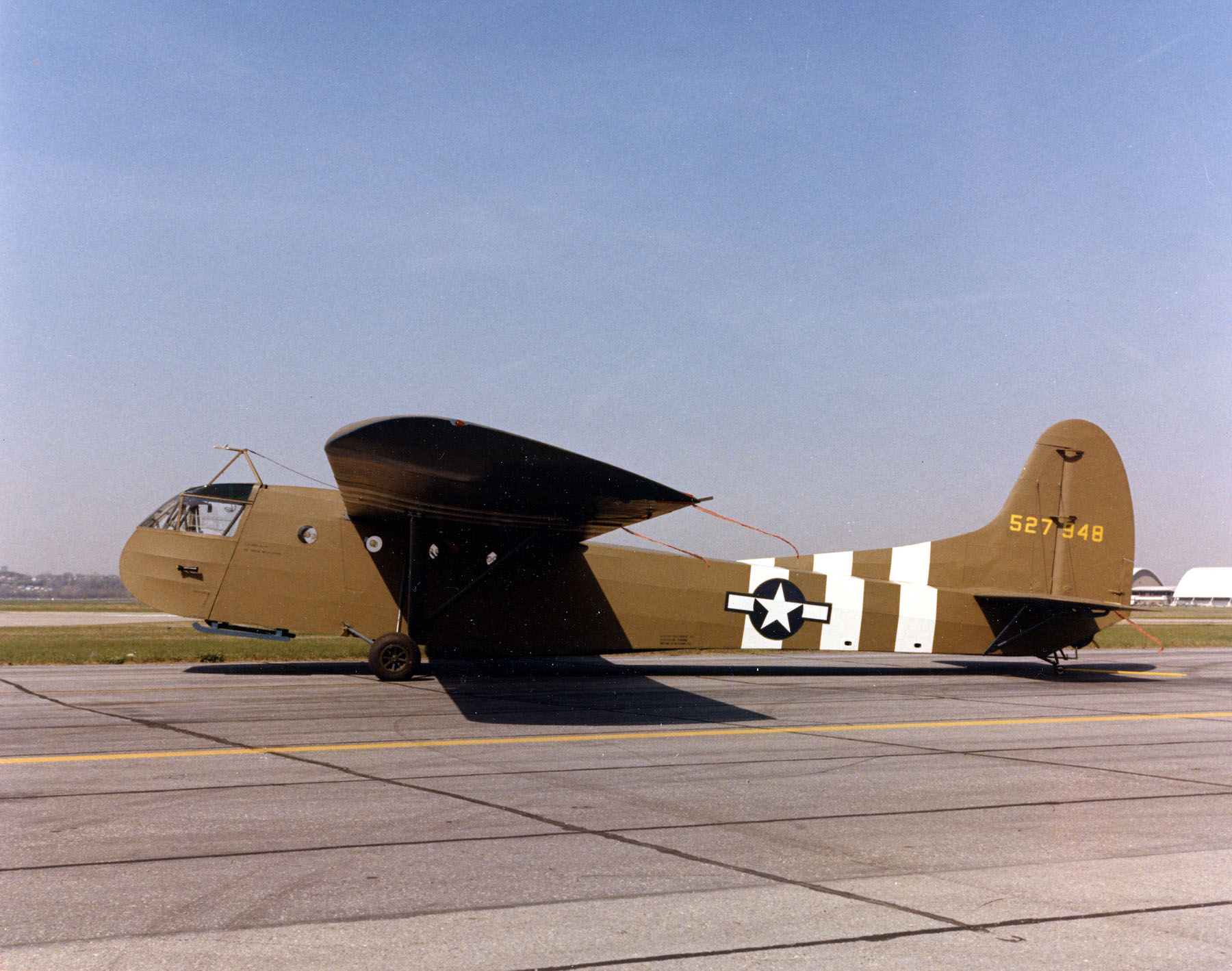
Waco CG-4A Glider

Its first wing, the 50th Troop Carrier Wing, became operational on 17 October 1943. A second wing, the 52d Troop Carrier Wing, arrived from Sicily on 17 February 1944. Its five groups had participated in the large airborne assault during Operation Husky, the Allied invasion of Sicily and had flown combat jumps on a smaller scale in Italy. On 11 March 1944 the final troop carrier wing assigned to the command, the 53rd Troop Carrier Wing, arrived from the United States along with five groups that had just completed their operational training. The wings were realigned to provide the 53rd, tasked as the primary unit for glider operations, with the four groups already operational in February 1944 (434th through 437th), while the least experienced groups were assigned to the 50th Wing. The command grew to a total of 14 groups in April 1944 when the 315th was taken off transport duties in the Mediterranean and assigned two additional squadrons to bring it up to full table of organization and equipment strength, and when the newly created 442d Troop Carrier Group arrived from the United States.

These groups went into training for Operation Overlord, the invasion of France, as they arrived in Britain. The groups of the 50th and 52nd Wings began intensive night formation training that included practice jumps with the airborne divisions assigned to them, which continued through April, when the division commanders decided to stop further unit jump training. The 53rd Wing began training at the beginning of March but had virtually no troop experience until mid-May, when they began a series of mock night operations to raise their level of training. Both the 315th and 442nd groups continued formation training until the end of May. Five groups also conducted training in night glider assaults during both April and May. By 1 June the command had approximately 1,200 C-47s and 1,400 gliders assigned, and 950 crews for each.

At the end of February 1944, using equipment and personnel from the 52nd Wing, the command established a training unit for airborne division pathfinders and the aircrews that would deliver them. The Command Pathfinder School was redesignated the 1st Pathfinder Group (Provisional) in August 1944.

IX Troop Carrier Command delivered both the 82nd and 101st Airborne Divisions in the American airborne landings in Normandy on 6–7 June 1944. In August the command was attached to the First Allied Airborne Army, which from 17–25 September 1944, landed both American divisions, the British 1st Airborne Division, and the Polish 1st Independent Parachute Brigade in the Netherlands during Operation Market Garden. The 50th Wing moved to bases in France in September as well.

In February and March 1945 the 52d and 53rd wings also deployed to bases in France, except for two groups of the 52nd assigned to support British airborne operations. The command carried out extensive formation training for Operation Varsity, an airborne assault across the Rhine River, and executed it on 24 March 1945, delivering the 17th Airborne Division. The groups of the 52nd Wing based in France returned to England to carry the British 6th Airborne Division in the assault.

=== Return to the United States ===
IX Troop Carrier Command transferred from the United Kingdom to the United States without equipment or personnel on 5 September 1945 to Stout Field, Indiana, where it took over the personnel and equipment of I Troop Carrier Command along with the command of troop carrier units in the United States. On 1 February 1946 command headquarters moved to Greenville Army Air Base, South Carolina, in preparation for inactivation, which took place 31 March 1946, when the command transferred its personnel and equipment to Third Air Force, which assumed responsibility for troop carrier operations for Tactical Air Command. On 8 October 1948 the United States Air Force, now a separate military service, disbanded the command.

=== Notable Members ===
Major Vincent F. Harrington, former U.S. Representative from Iowa briefly served as a security officer.

Flight Officer Dale Oliver, served as a Glider Pilot in the 434th Troop Carrier Group. Piloted a glider in combat operations in Normandy, Holland, and Germany. Later went on to be an assistant and primary animator for Disney, with credits including Peter Pan and Winnie the Pooh.

== Lineage ==
- Constituted as the IX Troop Carrier Command on 11 October 1943

Activated on 16 October 1943.
Inactivated on 31 March 1946
Disbanded on 8 October 1948

=== Assignments ===
- Ninth Air Force, 16 October 1943
- United States Strategic Air Forces, 25 August 1944 (attached to 1st Allied Airborne Army c. 1 November 1944 – c. 1 September 1945)
- Continental Air Forces, c. 5 September 1945
- Tactical Air Command, 21 March 1946 – 31 March 1946

=== Stations ===
- RAF Cottesmore (AAF-489), England, 16 October 1943
- St Vincent's Hall, Grantham. (AAF-480), England, 1 December 1943 - 19 September 1944
- Eastcote Place, London (Advanced HQ shared with 38 Group, RAF), England, February 1944 – February 1945
- Chateau De Pruney, Paris (Advanced HQ), France, February 1945 – June 1945
- Ascot (AAF-472), England, 19 September 1944 – 5 September 1945
- Stout Field, Indiana, 5 September 1945
- Greenville Army Air Base, South Carolina, 1 February – 31 March 1946

=== Components ===
Wings

- 50th Troop Carrier Wing, 16 October 1943 – 29 September 1945; 4 November 1945 – 31 March 1946
- 52d Troop Carrier Wing, 17 February 1944 - July 1945
- 53d Troop Carrier Wing, 11 March 1944 – 12 August 1945

Groups

- Command Pathfinder School (later 1st Pathfinder Group [Provisional]), March 1944 – April 1945
- 437th Troop Carrier Group: 4–15 November 1945
- 439th Troop Carrier Group: 16 August 1944 – September 1945; c. 4 November 1945 – 21 March 1946 (Note: Robertson says the group was assigned to I Troop Carrier Command until c. December 1945, but I Troop Carrier Command was disbanded on 4 November 1945. Maurer, Combat Units, p. 438.)
- 440th Troop Carrier Group: 25 March 1944 – March 1944
- 442d Troop Carrier Group: 31 March 1944 – April 1944

Squadrons

- 75th Troop Carrier Squadron: 15 November – 11 December 1945
- 77th Troop Carrier Squadron: 15 November – 11 December 1945

==== Support units ====
- 1st Tactical Air Deport/IX Troop Carrier Service Wing (Provisional)

Located at: RAF North Witham (AAF-479),
