= 1944 Ålvand RAF Lancaster crash =

Incident in WWII in Denmark

Shootdown
- Date: August 29, 1944
- Summary: Allied bomber shot down by German night fighter
- Site: Ålvand, east of Nørre Vorupør, Thy, Denmark; 56°56′39.21″N 8°25′5.78″E

First aircraft
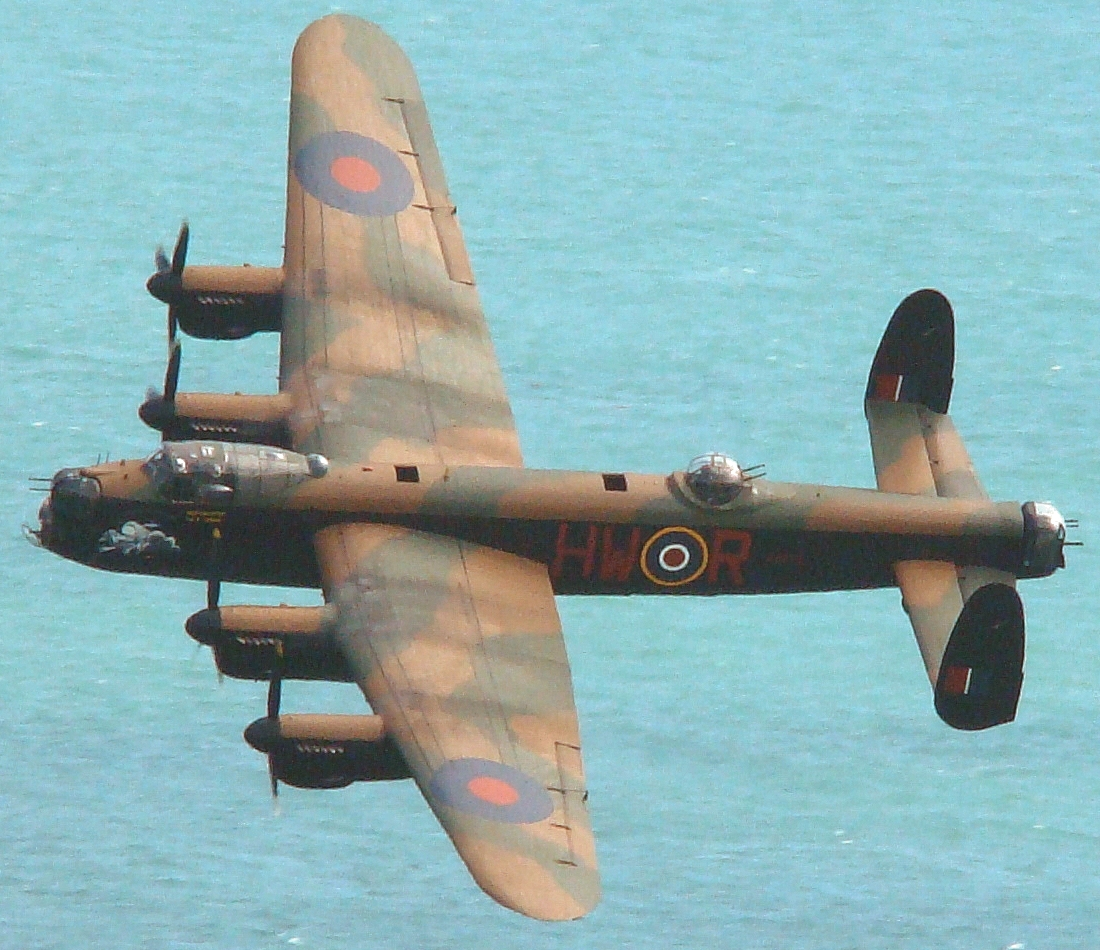
- Avro Lancaster in flight
- Type: Avro Lancaster
- Operator: RAF No. 8 (Pathfinder Force) Group, No. 582 Squadron
- Registration: Serial PB202; Markings 60-E
- Flight origin: RAF Little Staughton, Cambridgeshire, England
- Destination: Intended to bomb Stettin and Königsberg
- Crew: 7
- Fatalities: 7
- Survivors: 0

Second aircraft
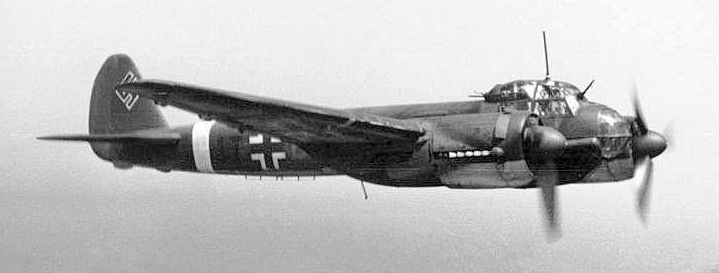
- Junkers Ju 88 in flight
- Type: Junkers Ju 88
- Operator: Luftwaffe Nachtjagdgeschwader 3, Squadron 4
- Crew: 3
- Fatalities: 0
- Survivors: 3

Ground casualties
- Ground fatalities: 0

The Ålvand Allied bomber crash refers to the shooting down of the Allied Avro Lancaster PB202 by a German night fighter over the small lake Ålvand, in the heathland east of Nørre Vorupør, Thy, Denmark, on the night of 29 August 1944. All of the seven crew were killed.

== Background ==
On 29 August 1944, at 2110 English time (2210 Danish time), a total of 402 RAF planes, including the Lancaster in question, took off for a bombing raid towards Stettin and Königsberg. The planned route passed over northern Denmark, then continued over Sweden and Germany; it returned the same way. 23 of the aircraft were ultimately lost.

It was previously thought that the downed bomber was first hit on its return flight by anti-aircraft artillery at Lyngby Battery, located on the coast ~10 km south of Vorupør, Thy. However, later investigation showed that the bomber was instead first hit on its outbound flight by shots fired from a radar-equipped German night fighter over Lodbjerg (slightly further south on the Danish west coast). The bomber was executing a course change from north east to east by south-east at the time, in order to proceed to the Kullen region of Scania. The night fighter was probably scrambled following the bomber being detected by several German radar installations in Denmark. A small Wassermann-S radar at Thyborøn (on the coast south of Ålvand) pinged the Lancaster on the night of the crash, as did an installation at Hjardemål (inland, to the north-east).

== The bomber ==
The Lancaster was part of RAF No. 8 (Pathfinder Force) Group, No. 582 Squadron and was based at RAF Little Staughton. It was used as a Pathfinder aircraft, which were responsible for marking targets for other bombers using flares and incendiary weapons.

== The crash ==
After being shot by the night fighter, the Lancaster banked. It likely passed over Lyngby Battery as it did so, taking further damage from the artillery there. In flames and rapidly losing height, it passed low over the farm Udemark by Førby Lake, 2 km east of Nørre Vorupør. It glanced off a dune and struck the ground violently next to the small lake Ålvand; it is believed the crew were attempting to ditch into the lake. All of the crew were killed on impact.

At the crash site, five large holes created by the bomber's four engines and the fuselage itself remain today.

== The German aircraft and crew ==
The German aircraft was a Junkers Ju 88 night fighter from Luftwaffe Nachtjagdgeschwader 3, Squadron 4, piloted by the fighter ace Unteroffizier (Corporal) Bruno Rupp. Two other crew members, by the names of Eckert and Biell, were also aboard. Rupp engaged the Lancaster from a height of 3600 m, and it became his 11th shootdown of the war. In total, Rupp would later reach 16 confirmed shootdowns.

== Bomber crew and burial ==
Crew of the downed Avro Lancaster
Service number	Rank	Name	Flight role	Age / years	Allegiance	Nationality	Decorations
40046	Squadron Leader	Allan L. Farrington	Pilot	29	Royal Air Force	Australian	
J/9481	Flight Lieutenant	Alfred C. Strout	1st Navigator	unknown	Royal Canadian Air Force	Canadian	
J/13758	Flight Lieutenant	Lorne V. Tyndale	2nd Navigator	unknown	Royal Canadian Air Force	Canadian	
56185	Pilot Officer	Henry Silverwood	Wireless Operator; Gunner	24	Royal Air Force	English	Distinguished Flying Medal
1576847	Flight Sergeant	Douglas E. J. Stevens	Gunner	20	Royal Air Force	English	
169048	Flying Officer	Charles F. Stewart	Gunner	22	Royal Air Force	Northern Irish	Distinguished Flying Medal
53275	Flying Officer	George R. Bradley	Flight Engineer	23	Royal Air Force	English	Distinguished Flying Medal

The killed airmen were initially buried in the heathland at the site of the crash by the German Wehrmacht. A white wooden cross was raised at the grave by German soldiers, with text (in German) reading "Hier ruhen 7 unbekannte anglo amerik. Flieger 29.8.1944" (English: "Here lie 7 unknown Anglo-Americans. Airmen, 29.8.1944").

On 3 February 1947, British authorities exhumed the bodies, placed them in coffins, and re-buried them at Vorupør Cemetery. The same plot also contains the remains of an unidentified British soldier, who was washed ashore on the beach near Nørre Vorupør in Autumn 1944. He was initially buried on the shore by the Wehrmacht and was then, following the German surrender, exhumed and moved to the churchyard by locals on 14 June 1945.

== Descriptions by locals ==
It remains uncertain exactly which bombs were carried by the Lancaster, but it is clear that it released three bombs over the farm meadows at Koustrup Møllegaard, Sønderhå (approximately 10 km south by south-east of Ålvand) prior to the crash. The bombs, which were probably photoflash bombs, caused damage to buildings in the area. Locals described an intense flash that temporarily turned night to day, followed by a loud bang and shaking. After the Lancaster was hit, the crew would have had good reason to eject any ordnance over a sparsely populated area, partly to prevent civilian casualties but also to minimise the chance of the crew being killed by explosions if the aircraft was to crash. The photoflashes left several craters at Koustrup Møllegaard; during subsequent summers, workers at the farm were tasked with filling in the holes when there was no other work to be carried out.

Agnes Møller (born 1909), who lived on the farm at the time, wrote of the bombs in her memoirs:

It was a strange experience. We went down to the bomb shelter. I was carried down there in a duvet they had tied around me. It was only in the morning that we understood how lucky we had been, in that the farmhouse itself hadn't been hit. It was bad enough. Ninety windows were broken. The two uppermost windows in the gable end of the farmhouse were hanging down just outside where my [paternal] Aunt slept. She came down to us, very scared. The stove [masonry heater] in the dining room lay spread out all over the floor and the lamp, which was attached to a plaster ring, hung down over the table in the sitting room from a thin thread, ring and all. The whole farmhouse had taken a serious shaking, so later on the plaster ceilings fell down all over the place, and the bands that held the roof tiles were either hanging loose or had broken. We found that out later. We got DKK 1700 in compensation, but of course that wasn't sufficient at all because the damage kept appearing.

In Nørre Vorupør, locals reported an enormous ball of light so brilliant that "you could see a matchstick in the gravel".
