= Louis Flury-Hérard =

French soldier and aviator

- Born: 2 March 1898; Melun, France
- Died: 3 June 1941 (aged 43) Sudan
- Allegiance: France
- Branch: Free French Air Force
- Service years: 1916 - 1941
- Rank: Captain
- Known for: Aviator
- Conflicts: World War I World War II
- Awards: Legion of Honour; Order of Liberation

Louis Joseph Bertrand Flury-Hérard (2 March 1898 - 3 June 1941) was a French soldier and aviator who fought in both World War I and World War II.

== Biography ==
Louis Flury-Hérard was born on 2 March 1898 in Melun and died in combat flying over Sudan.

== Wartime service ==
As the son of an officer, he enlisted, on November 4, 1916, as a volunteer in the 26th Battalion of chasseurs. He then moved, in June 1917, to the 66th Battalion of chasseurs. While in Juvincourt-et-Damary he was injured by shrapnel. In February 1918 Hérard was assigned to the Saint-Cyr officer cadet training center and became a midshipman in August 1918. After joining the aviation, he was certified as an observer and was promoted to second lieutenant.

In November 1919, returning to civilian life, he became a banker but returned to the military as a reserve lieutenant in March 3, 1925 and mobilized in August 1939. Resumption of training on modern aircraft, he became an instructor at the Cazaux Air Base.

On June 24, 1940, he joined with the English after the armistice and joined the Free French Air Forces with the rank of captain. He was then appointed deputy commander of the “Topic” bombing squadron, under the orders of Jean Astier de Villatte.

In October 1940, he joined Takoradi with his squadron which was attached to the Free French Equatorial Air Forces to form with the "Menace" squadron the Le groupe de bombardement n° 1 (GRB1), under the orders of Commander Astier de Villatte. This group was created in Chad at the initiative of Edgard de Larminat, High Commissioner of Free France for Equatorial Africa.

The GRB1, equipped with Bristol Blenheims, participated in supporting Philippe Leclerc's troops in operations in the Libyan desert.

In 1941, flying as an observer on a Blenheim bomber, Hérard organized and took part in the operations and victory at Kufra.

He died on June 3, 1941 in Anglo-Egyptian Sudan, near Al-Fashir, during an air accident while joining the squadron of the group operating in Abyssinia. The 3 other members of the crew also perished

== Medals and awards ==
- Legion of Honour
- Order of Liberation (by decree of June 21, 1941)
- Croix de guerre 1914–1918
- Croix de Guerre 1939–1945 (with palm)
- Resistance Medal (by decree of March 11, 1947)
- Colonial Medal
- 1914–1918 Commemorative war medal
