= Ted Swales =

Recipient of the Victoria Cross

Ted Swales VC DFC
- Born: Edwin Essery Swales; 3 July 1915; Inanda, Natal Province, Union of South Africa
- Died: 23 February 1945 (aged 29) near Valenciennes, France
- Burial place: War Cemetery at Leopoldsburg, near Limburg, Belgium; 51°6′44.17″N 5°16′6.47″E
- Military career
- Allegiance: South Africa; United Kingdom
- Branch: South African Army; South African Air Force; Royal Air Force
- Service years: 1935–1942 (Army); 1942–1945 (Air Force)
- Rank: Major
- Nickname: Ted
- Service number: 6101V
- Units: Pathfinder Force with No. 582 Squadron RAF
- Conflicts: World War II; Raid on Cologne; Raid on Pforzheim
- Awards: Victoria Cross; Distinguished Flying Cross

Edwin (Ted) Essery Swales VC DFC (3 July 1915 – 23 February 1945) was a South African pilot and Second World War hero. He was awarded the Distinguished Flying Cross and posthumously the Victoria Cross.

== Early life and career ==
Edwin Essery Swales was one of four children born in Inanda, Natal, South Africa to Harry Evelyn Swales, who was a farmer in the Heatonville district, and Olive Miriam Essery. Following the death of her husband in the influenza epidemic of 1918-19, Mrs Swales and her children moved to the Berea, Durban. Here, Edwin Swales attended Durban Preparatory High School and Durban High School (DHS). As a young lad, Edwin had also been a Boy Scout, at the 4th Durban Scout Troop. After leaving school, and prior to the Second World War, Edwin Swales worked for Barclays Bank (Dominion Colonial and Overseas - DCO) in Durban. Swales had joined the Natal Mounted Rifles in 1935, rising to the rank of sergeant major, (officially, a warrant officer, 2nd class). With the N.M.R., in the early part of the War, he saw action in Kenya, Abyssinia and in North Africa. He then transferred to the South African Air Force on 17 January 1942.

Swales was also very keen on sport generally, and enjoyed rugby. He played for both civilian (pre-war) and various military teams. After playing for the DHS 2nd XV, he later played rugby for a number of South African and Dominion teams, whilst he was in the United Kingdom, during the War years. He played for Griquas when he had been posted to Kimberley for training. He was also a reserve for the Natal rugby team, without ever actually playing for the province. He received his wings at Kimberley on 26 June 1943. On 22 August 1943, he was seconded to the Royal Air Force (RAF) while retaining his South African Air Force uniform and rank.

== Second World War ==
Following successful period of training on heavy bombers, Swales was posted, in June 1944, to the elite RAF Pathfinder Force (with 582 Squadron), part of No. 8 Pathfinder Group, at Little Staughton, in Huntingdonshire. It was normal for the Pathfinders to accept only experienced pilots who had completed a full tour on bombers. Although Swales had never spent any time as a bomber pilot in a standard heavy bomber squadron, Swales went straight into the squadron.

Swales' first operational flight for 582 Squadron was on 12 July 1944. Newly promoted to captain on 4 November 1944, he took part in a daring daylight bombing raid on 23 December, on the Gremberg railway yards, Cologne, Germany. The Squadron Leader for the raid on Cologne was his close friend, Robert Palmer, who normally flew Mosquitos with 109 Squadron, also based at Little Staughton. Swales was the number two Pathfinder, leading the main flight and following Palmer as he marked the target. Palmer, who had completed 110 bombing raids, was killed as his Lancaster, despite being damaged by flak and with two engines on fire, crashed after completing its bombing run. Palmer was awarded a posthumous Victoria Cross – becoming the 2nd Pathfinder pilot to be so honoured. Six of the 30 aircraft on this operation were lost.

For his actions on the Cologne raid, Edwin Swales was subsequently awarded the Distinguished Flying Cross. The citation reads:

This Officer was pilot and Captain of an aircraft detailed to attack Cologne in December, 1944. When approaching the target, intense anti-aircraft fire was encountered. Despite this, a good bombing attack was executed. Soon afterwards the aircraft was attacked by five enemy aircraft. In the ensuing fights, Capt. Swales manoeuvred with great skill. As a result his gunners were able to bring effective fire to bear upon the attackers, one of which is believed to have been shot down. Throughout this spirited action Captain Swales displayed exceptional coolness and captaincy, setting a very fine example. This Officer has completed very many sorties during which he has attacked a variety of enemy targets

== Victoria Cross ==
In 1945, while with the RAF Pathfinders (No. 582 Squadron), Swales was the Master Bomber and captain of Avro Lancaster III PB538. On 23 February 1945, the very day as his D.F.C. award was gazetted, Swales led the bombing raid on Pforzheim, Germany (not far from Karlsruhe and the Rhine River), where 17,600 civilians were killed.

The 'sortie', his 43rd operational flight, consisted of 367 Lancasters supported by 13 Mosquitos. The marking and bombing, from a relatively low 8,000 feet (2440m), were accurate and severe damage was inflicted on Pforzheim: 1,825 tons (1854 tonnes) of bombs were dropped in 22 minutes. The post-war British Bombing Survey Unit estimated that 83% of the town's built-up area was destroyed, probably the greatest proportion of a city destroyed in any one raid during the war. Ten Lancasters were lost and two more crashed in France.

Swales' aircraft was attacked by an Bf 110 (Note: possibly piloted by Hptm. Gerhard Friedrich, II/NJG1) whose fire shattered one engine and holed the fuel tanks. They were attacked again by the same fighter which knocked out a second engine. Swales decided to try and make it to friendly territory. The weather closed in and he ordered the crew (Note: The crew members, six of whom had flown with Swales on 30 of his 43 flights, were: Flight Sergeants G.W. Bennington DFM; C. Dodson DSO DFC and W/O 1st Class B. Leach DFM; Squadron Leader D.P.D. Archer DSO DFC; and Pilot Officers R.A. Wheaton RAAF; A.V. Goodacre RAAF and N. Bourne RCAF.) to bail out. He attempted to put his Lancaster down but it stalled and crashed near Valenciennes, west of Prouvy, 3 km SSE of Denain in northern France (Note: about 250 miles (400 km), from Pforzheim) killing him. He was posthumously awarded the Victoria Cross – the 3rd and last Pathfinder pilot to be so honoured. All had been posthumous.

=== Citation ===
Swales' VC citation reads:

Captain Swales was 'Master Bomber' of a force of aircraft which attacked Pforzheim on the night of February 23, 1945. As Master Bomber he had the task of locating the target area with precision and of giving aiming instructions to the main force of bombers in his wake.

Soon after he reached the target area he was engaged by an enemy aircraft and one of his engines was put out of action. His rear guns failed. His crippled aircraft was an easy prey for further attacks. Unperturbed, he carried on with his allotted task; clearly and precisely he issued aiming instructions to the main force. Meanwhile the enemy fighter closed the range and fired again. A second engine of Captain Swales' aircraft was put out of action. Almost defenceless, he stayed over the target area issuing his aiming instructions until he was satisfied that the attack had achieved its purpose.

It is now known that the attack was one of the most concentrated and successful of the war. Captain Swales did not, however, regard his mission as completed. His aircraft was damaged. Its speed had been so much reduced that it could only with difficulty be kept in the air. The blind-flying instruments were no longer working. Determined at all costs to prevent his aircraft and crew from falling into enemy hands, he set course for home. After an hour he flew into thin-layered cloud. He kept his course by skilful flying between the layers, but later heavy cloud and turbulent air conditions were met. The aircraft, by now over friendly territory, became more and more difficult to control; it was losing height steadily. Realising that the situation was desperate Captain Swales ordered his crew to bail out. Time was very short and it required all his exertions to keep the aircraft steady while each of his crew moved in turn to the escape hatch and parachuted to safety. Hardly had the last crew-member jumped when the aircraft plunged to earth. Captain Swales was found dead at the controls.

Intrepid in the attack, courageous in the face of danger, he did his duty to the last, giving his life that his comrades might live.

== Legacy ==
Originally buried at Fosse's USA Cemetery, his remains now lie at the War Cemetery at Leopoldsburg, near Limburg, Belgium, Plot No.8, Row C, Grave No.5.51°6′44.17″N 5°16′6.47″E

Air Chief Marshal Sir Arthur 'Bomber' Harris, KCB, OBE, AFC, of RAF Bomber Command, wrote a letter to Swales' mother, saying, inter-alia:

.... On every occasion your son proved himself to be a determined fighter and resolute captain of his crew. His devotion to duty and complete disregard for his own safety will remain an example and inspiration to us all ....

Although often referred to as being a "captain" at the time of his last flight (because of being the commander of the aircraft), Swales was in military rank an 'acting' major. The S.A.A.F. was using the army ranking system, hence the ranks of 'captain' and of 'major'. At the time of his death on 23 February 1945, Swales was aged 29 years. In 1958, the British Air Ministry wrote to the Commonwealth War Graves Commission informing them that the South African Air Force authorities had confirmed that at the time of his death, Swales had in fact held the rank of major. The front page of the program for the opening of the S.A.A.F. Memorial in Pretoria on 31 May 1950, described Mrs. Olive Swales (who opened the Memorial) as being the "mother of the Late Major Edwin Swales, DFC, VC".

== Awards and recognition ==
Swales was the only S.A.A.F. pilot during 1939–45 to be appointed a pathfinder master bomber and also to have been posthumously awarded the Victoria Cross. The full list of the medals awarded to Swales follows:

- The Victoria Cross
- The Distinguished Flying Cross
- The 1939–1945 Star
- The Africa Star
- The France and Germany Star
- The Defence Medal, 1939–1945
- The 1939–1945 War Medal (Victory Medal)
- The Africa Service Medal

Swales' full-size war medals and some other possessions are held and displayed at the South African National Museum of Military History in Saxonwold, Johannesburg. At his old school, Durban High School (founded in 1866), a school 'House' is named Swales House. The school also has a granite memorial in his memory. In the city of Durban, there was a major arterial road named 'Edwin Swales VC Drive'. In terms of a controversial decision made by the eThekwini Municipality, Swales' name was expunged, and the road's name changed to honour instead noted anti-apartheid figure Solomon Mahlangu.

The original set of miniature medals belonging to Swales, and a silver model Lancaster bomber, are now housed in an exhibition honouring Swales at his old school, Durban High School. Many years ago, the miniature medals and the model had been sold by a member of the Swales family. After changing hands a few times, the group came up for auction in London in July 2004, at which time the medals and model were sold to a UK collector. A medal collector and D.H.S. Old Boy tracked down the buyer and convinced him to sell his recent acquisitions to the school. After four months of negotiations, the medals and model were delivered to their new home at DHS, where they were first displayed on Armistice Day, 11 November 2004.

The silver model Lancaster was one of only ten such models which were commissioned by the aircraft's manufacturers, Messrs A.V. Roe & Co. and by Rolls-Royce (suppliers of the Lancaster engines) and presented to the ten Victoria Cross winners (or their families) who flew Lancasters in the Second World War. On the base stand of the model is a silver plaque inscribed: "A Tribute from the Directors of A.V. Roe & Company and Rolls-Royce Limited. To the Memory of Captain Edwin Swales," V.C., D.F.C., S.A.A.F., who was Awarded the Victoria Cross for his great Gallantry and Self-Sacrifice during Operations Against the Enemy on 23 February 1945".

== See also ==
- Bombing of Cologne in World War II
- Bombing of Pforzheim in World War II
