= Beaching (nautical) =

Process in which a ship or boat is laid ashore

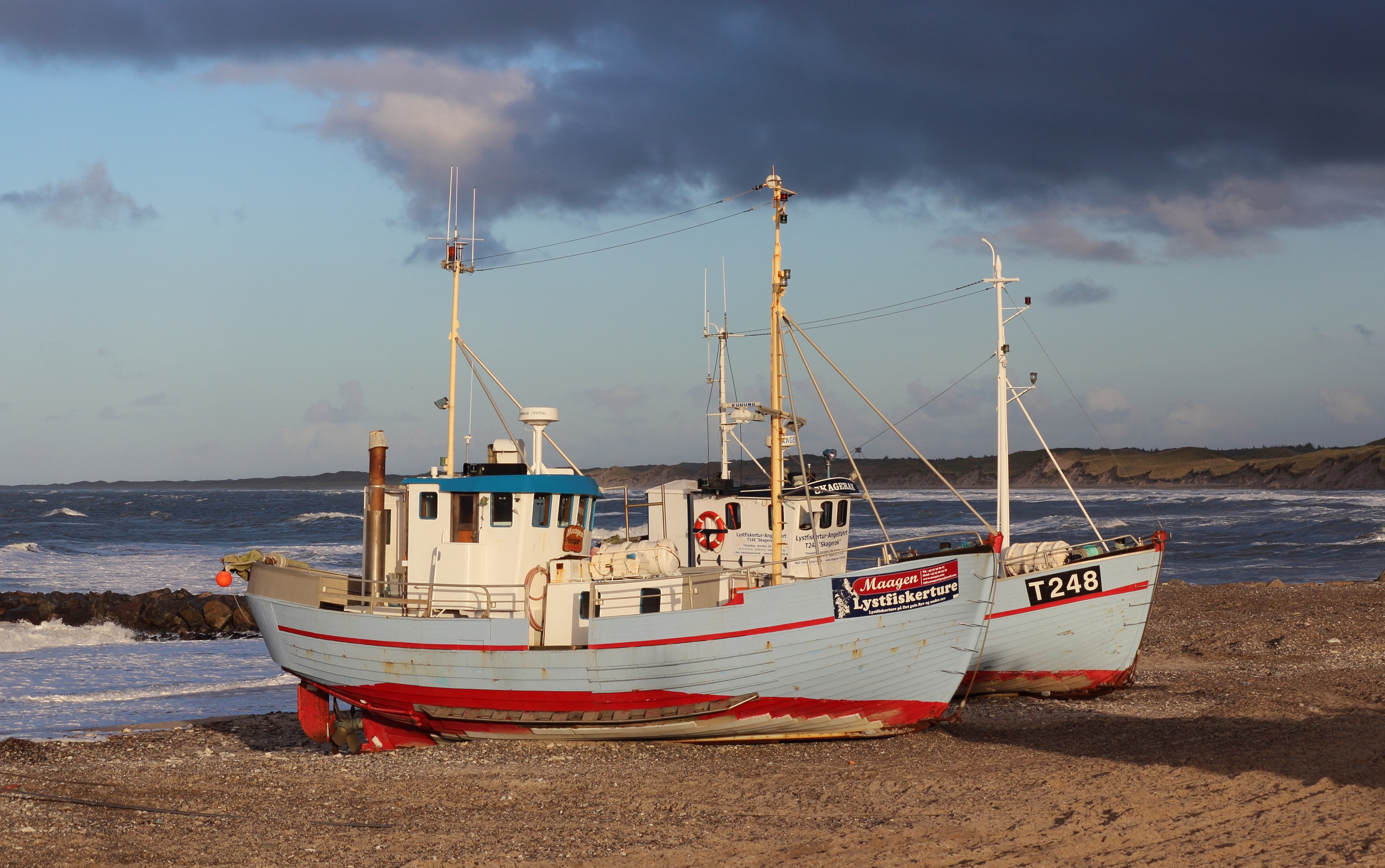
Two leisure fishing boats beached at Nørre Vorupør

Beaching (or landing) is the process in which a ship or boat is laid ashore, or grounded deliberately in shallow water. This is more usual with small flat-bottomed boats. Larger ships may be beached deliberately; for instance, in an emergency, a damaged ship might be beached to prevent it from sinking in deep water. Some vessels are designed to be loaded and unloaded by beaching; vessels of this type used by the military to disembark troops under fire are called landing craft.

During the Age of Sail, vessels were sometimes beached to allow them to be rolled over for the hull to be maintained, a process called careening.

Ships scheduled for break-up are sometimes intentionally beached to make the procedure easier.

== See also ==
- Cetacean stranding
- Landing craft
- Shipwrecking
