= Operation Exodus (WWII operation) =

1945 air repatriation of British PoWs

- Part of the Second World War
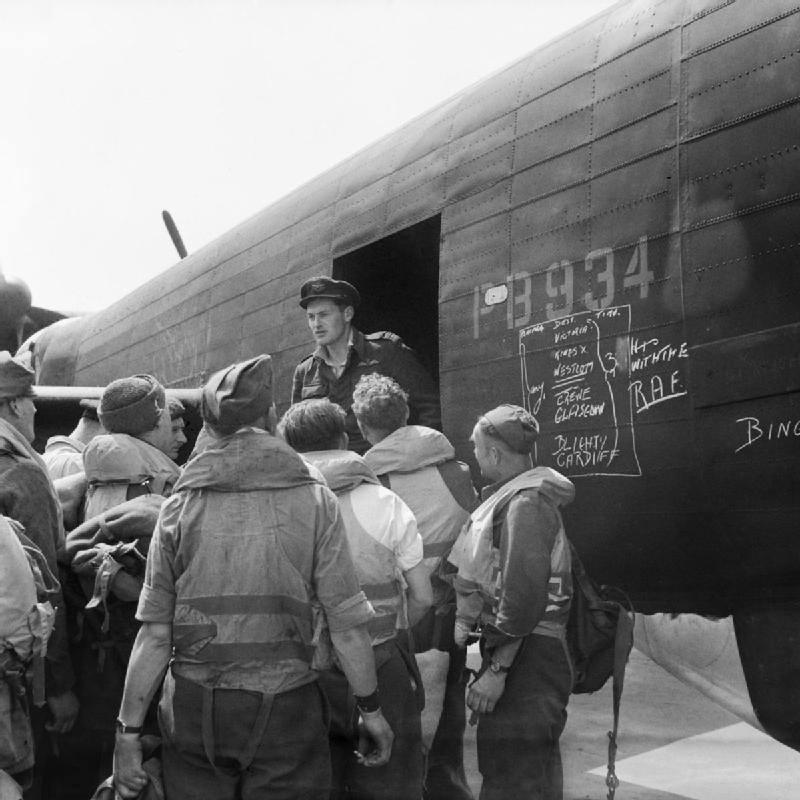
- British former PoWs preparing to board an Avro Lancaster heavy bomber of No. 582 Squadron RAF at Lübeck, Germany, May 1945.
- Location: Germany, Belgium, France, and the United Kingdom; 53°52′N 10°41′E
- Planned by: Royal Air Force
- Commanded by: RAF Bomber Command
- Objective: Air repatriation of British prisoners of war
- Date: 3 April 1945 – 31 May 1945
- Executed by: RAF Bomber Command
- Outcome: Successful repatriation of approximately 75,000 British ex-PoWs to the United Kingdom
- Casualties: 2 crashes resulting in 61 fatalities (see Casualties section)
- Primary collection and reception airfields used during the operation

Operation Exodus was a large-scale airlift conducted by the Royal Air Force in April and May 1945 to repatriate British prisoners of war liberated in the closing stages of the Second World War. Planned and executed by RAF Bomber Command, the operation used modified Avro Lancaster heavy bombers and other aircraft to collect former prisoners from airfields in Germany, Belgium and France and return them to reception centres in the United Kingdom.

By early May, up to five hundred men a day were passing through the main collection airfield at Juvincourt, and by the end of the month a total of around 3,500 flights had returned approximately 75,000 former prisoners to Britain. Although the operation was completed successfully, two aircraft were lost in accidents, resulting in sixty-one fatalities.

== Background ==
Following the liberation of Europe by allied forces, an urgent need emerged to promptly repatriate the recently liberated hundreds of thousands of British ex-prisoners of war (POWs). In response, RAF command opted to repurpose Lancaster bomber planes into transport aircraft for this vital mission, each configured to transport 24 men along with a minimal crew.

The chosen reception airfields for these repatriation flights included Westcott, Oakley, Cosford, in Shropshire, Dunsfold in Surrey and Wing in Buckinghamshire. Additionally, designated collection airfields were established in Lübeck, Germany, Brussels, Belgium and Juvincourt, France.

== The operation ==
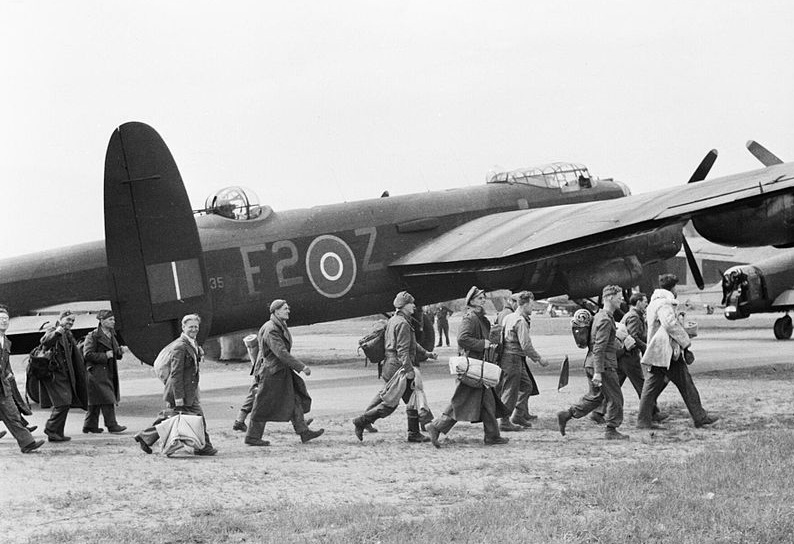
Avro Lancaster of No. 635 Squadron Pathfinder Force at Lübeck, Germany, on 11 May 1945 with ex-PoWs destined for repatriation.

The operation started with the receipt of orders at RAF Oakley, Buckinghamshire, on 2 April 1945, instructing the preparation for the arrival of 300 repatriated prisoners of war scheduled to land by air at 11:00. Extensive arrangements were made for their reception until the arrival was postponed for the following day. On 3 April, seven Dakotas landed with repatriated POWs, and by the end of the month, a total of 72 Douglas Dakotas twin-engined aircraft, transported 1,787 men.

In the subsequent month of May 1945, a significant number of personnel, totalling 15,088, were flown back using a variety of aircraft, including 443 Avro Lancasters, 103 Dakotas, 51 Handley Page Halifaxes, 31 Consolidated Liberators, 3 Short Stirlings, 3 Lockheed Hudsons and 2 Boeing B-17 Flying Fortresses.

On 8 May 1945 No. 405 Squadron flew ten of its Lancasters with former PoWs, departing from Brussels to RAF Westcott in Buckinghamshire. The same squadron continued its involvement with eight additional planes, bringing men back from Lübeck, Germany, on 9 and 10 May 1945. Its final mission in this operation took place on 15 May, with seven planes bringing back 360 prisoners from Juvincourt airfield near Rheims, France, to Buckinghamshire. Simultaneously, No. 617 Squadron departed on VE day, 8 May, to Brussels via Juvincourt, contributing to a daily influx of 500 men through Juvincourt alone.

Between 10 and 11 May, No. 550 Squadron executed forty-eight missions between Brussels and Westcott. On 14 May, No. 619 Squadron flew back from Lille, France. Throughout the entire operation, a total of 469 missions were conducted, facilitating the return of 75,000 former prisoners of war.

== Casualties ==
On 9 May, a Lancaster from No. 514 Squadron crashed between Westbeach and Juvincourt, killing the thirty men on board.

A second accident occurred during the operation involving No. 149 Squadron, which was transporting released Allied prisoners of war from Reims, France, to England. The airfield taxiway at Reims, originally designed for fighter aircraft, was too narrow for heavy bombers, and the wheels of one aircraft struck the stakes securing the perforated steel plate decking. A resulting tyre failure caused the aircraft to crash, killing all thirty-one passengers and crew.
