= Rheinberg War Cemetery =

Commonwealth War Graves Commission cemetery in Germany

- Commonwealth War Graves Commission
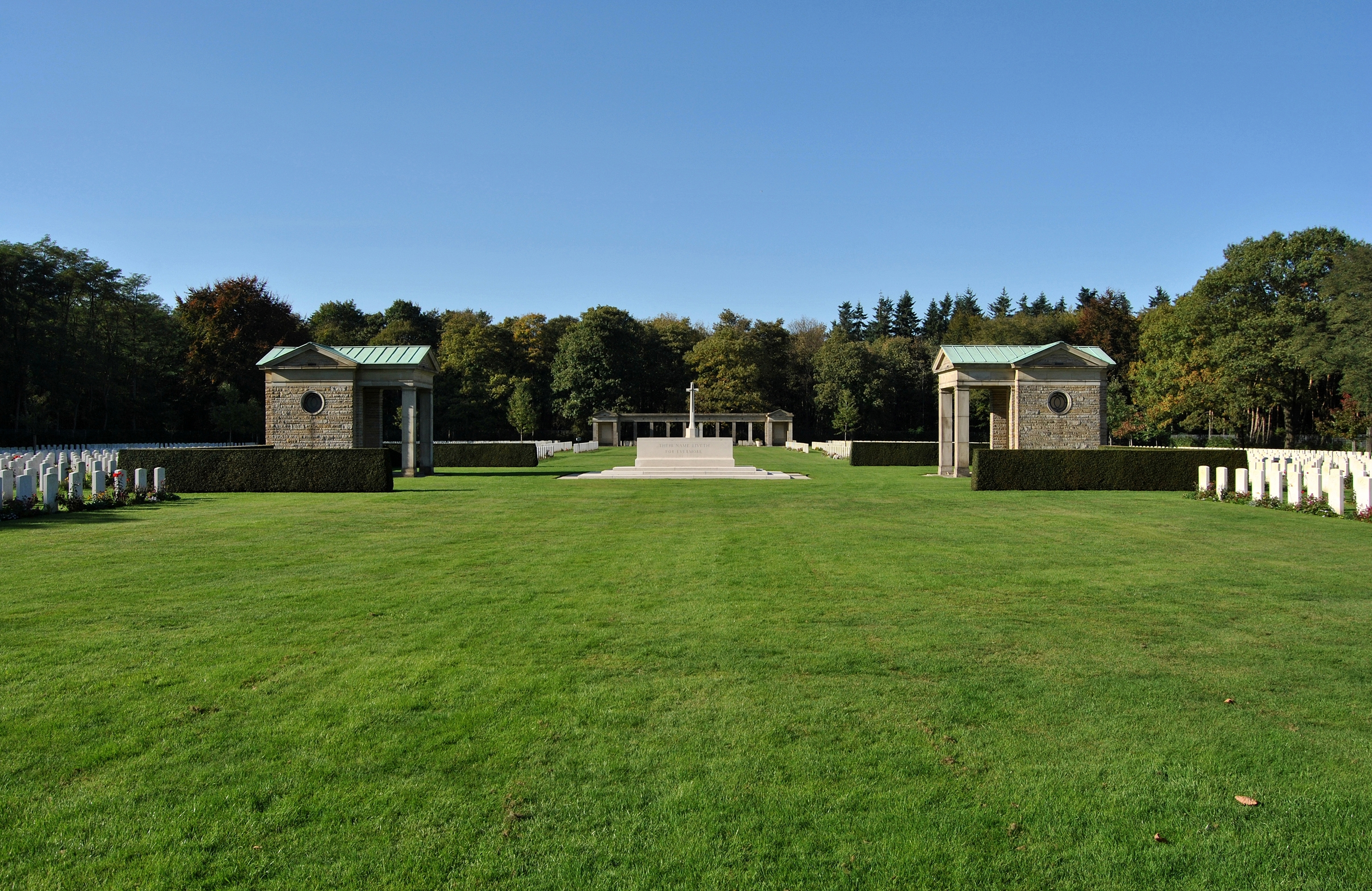
- Used for those deceased 1939–1945
- Established: 1946
- Location: 51°31′46″N 06°33′48″E near Rheinberg, Germany
- Total burials: 3330
- Unknowns: 157

Burials by nation
- United Kingdom: 2,308 (including 2 Dutch); Canada: 516; Australia: 240; New Zealand: 104; Poland: 8 South Africa: 5 United States: 1 India: 1

Burials by war
- World War II

The Rheinberg War Cemetery is a Commonwealth War Graves Commission cemetery in Rheinberg, Germany. It was established in 1946 and is home to 3,330 graves from the Second World War.

== History ==
The site for the Rheinberg War Cemetery was selected in April 1946. Commonwealth servicemen from other cemeteries in the region were moved to the new cemetery. Most of the servicemen buried served in the air force during the bombing of Germany. Servicemen from other services mostly fought during the Western Allied invasion of Germany.

== Cemetery ==
The cemetery was designed by Philip Hepworth following standard Commission architectural design features, and contains 3,330 graves, out of which 3,183 have been identified. Every grave is marked with a white headstone and the cemetery grounds are grass covered with a floral border around the headstones. The cemetery is surrounded on three sides by forest and borders a road in the south. The south side is walled by a hedge with a low wall and a wrought-iron gate entrance in the middle. The graves are located on the east and west side of the cemetery with the middle containing several structures such as a Stone of Remembrance and a Cross of Sacrifice.

== Notable interments ==
- Squadron leader Robert Palmer VC DFC & Bar (1920-1944), Second World War Victoria Cross recipient
- Flight Lieutenant John Vere Hopgood DFC & Bar (1921-1943), Royal Air Force pilot killed while participating in Operation Chastise.

== Gallery of images ==
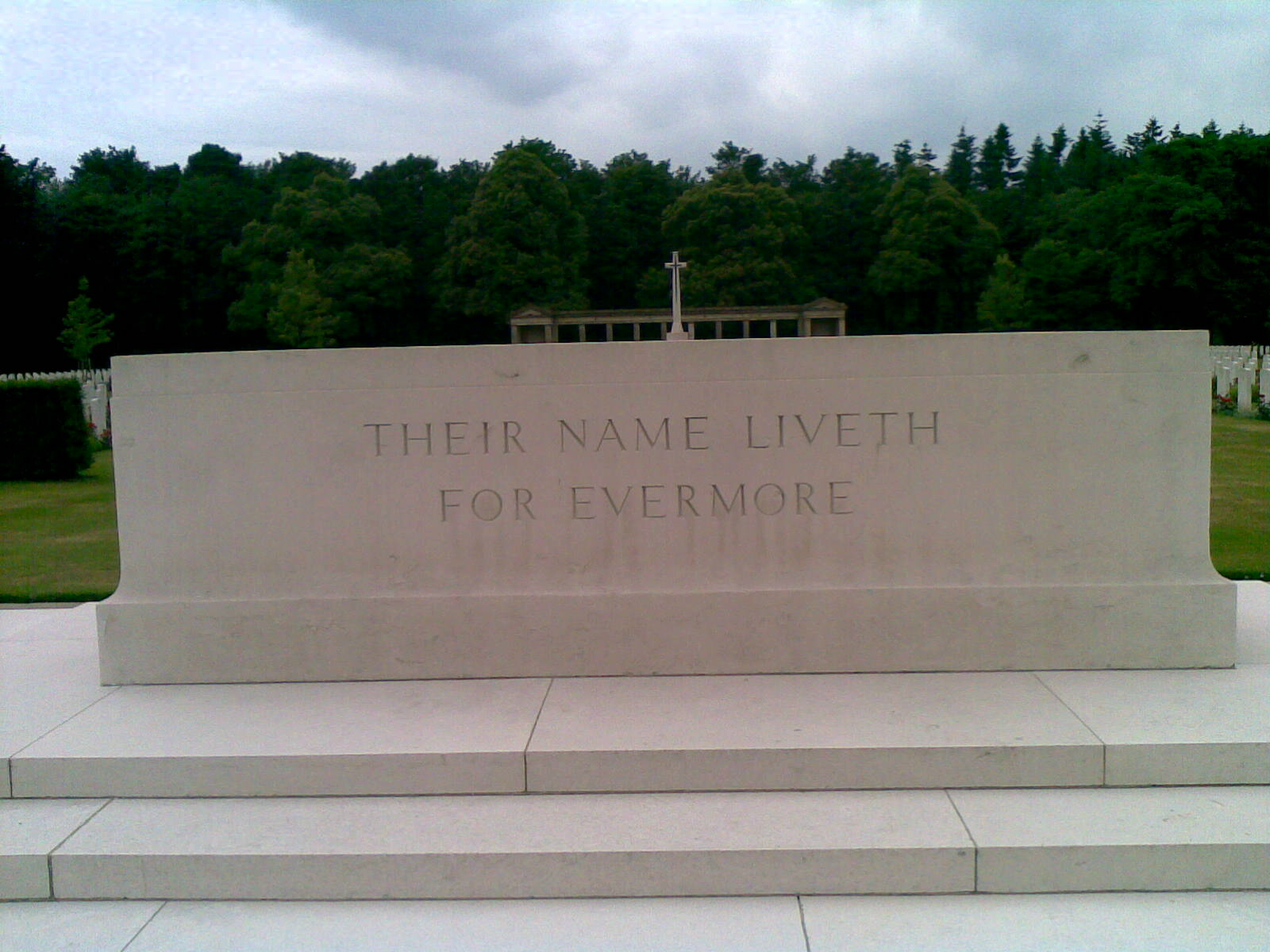
Stone of Remembrance

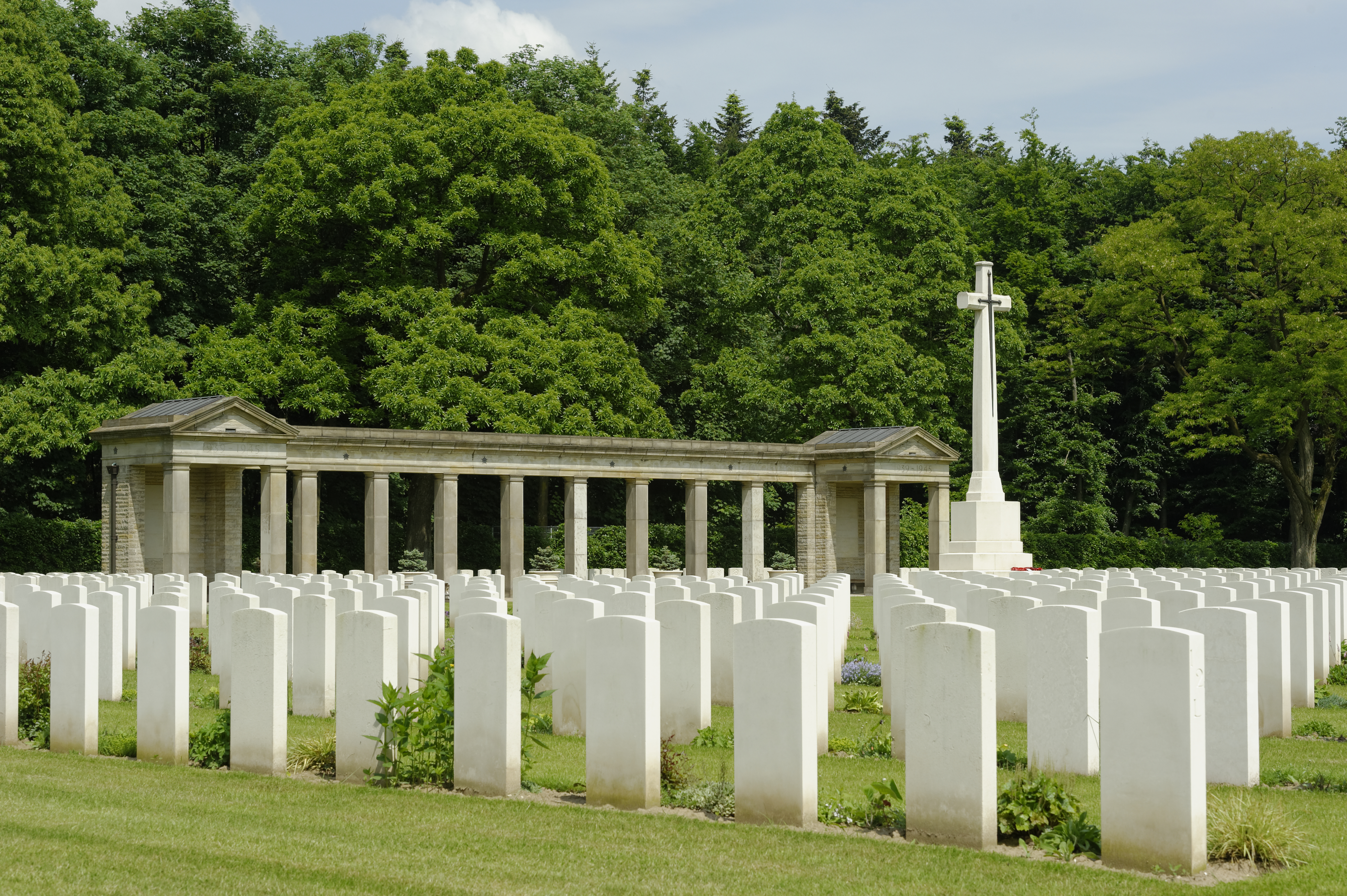
Graves and Cross of Sacrifice

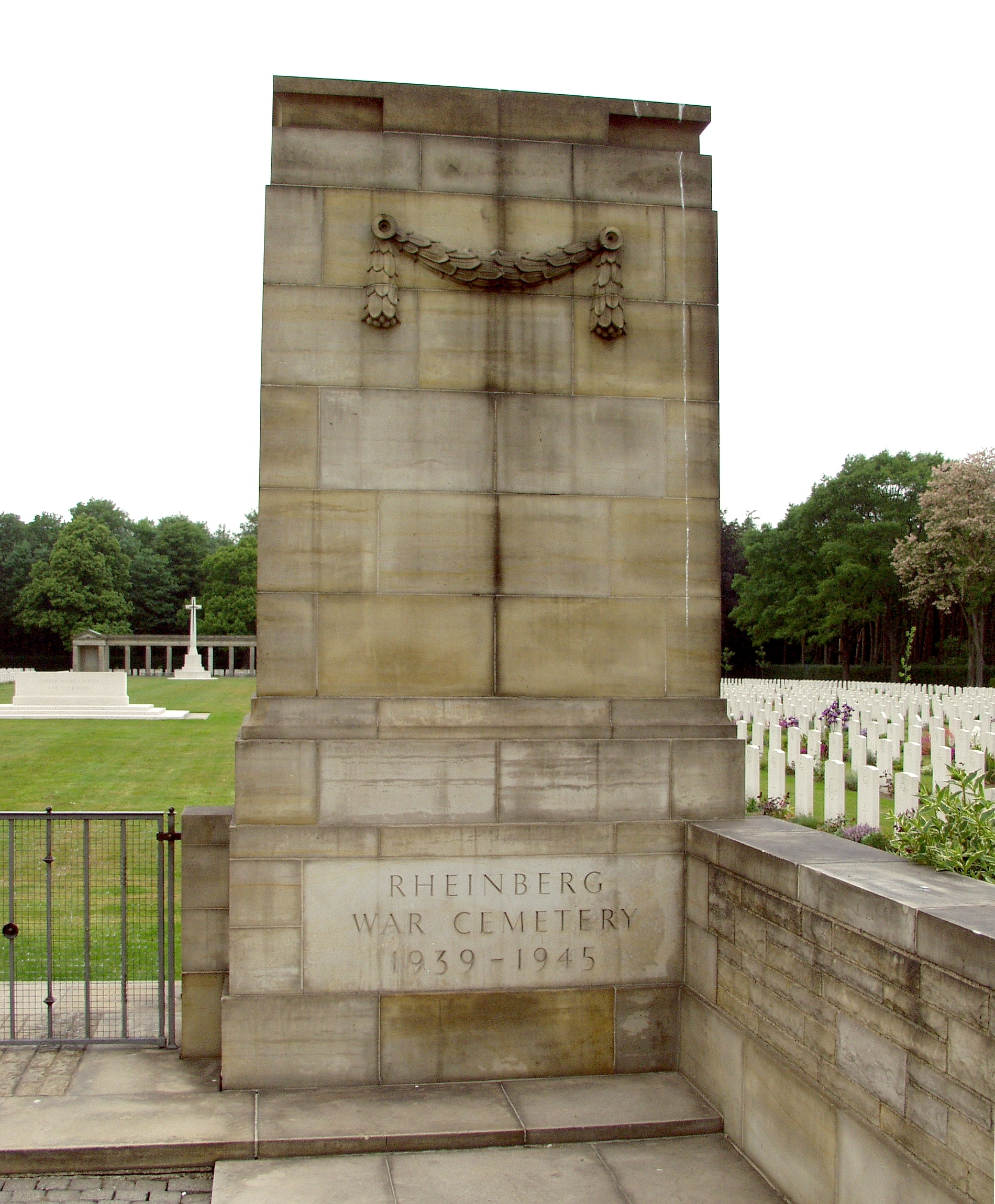
Entrance

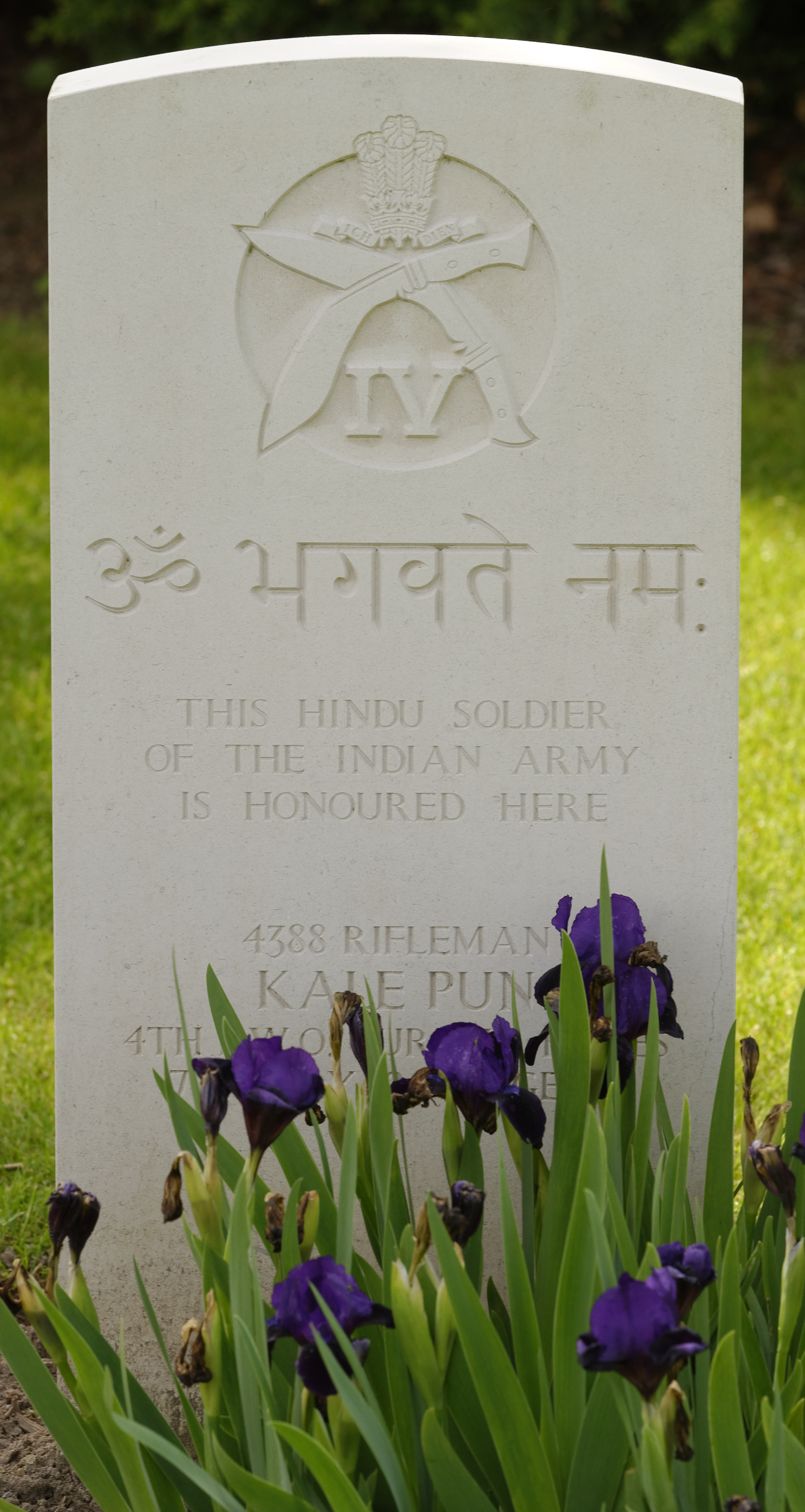
Indian Hindu grave

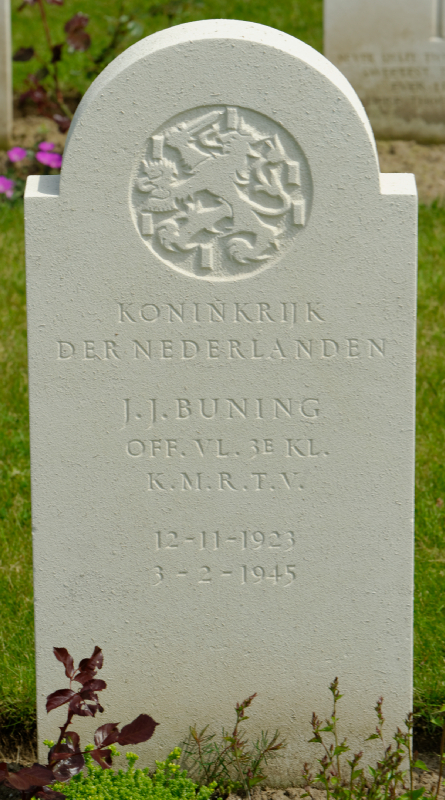
Dutch grave

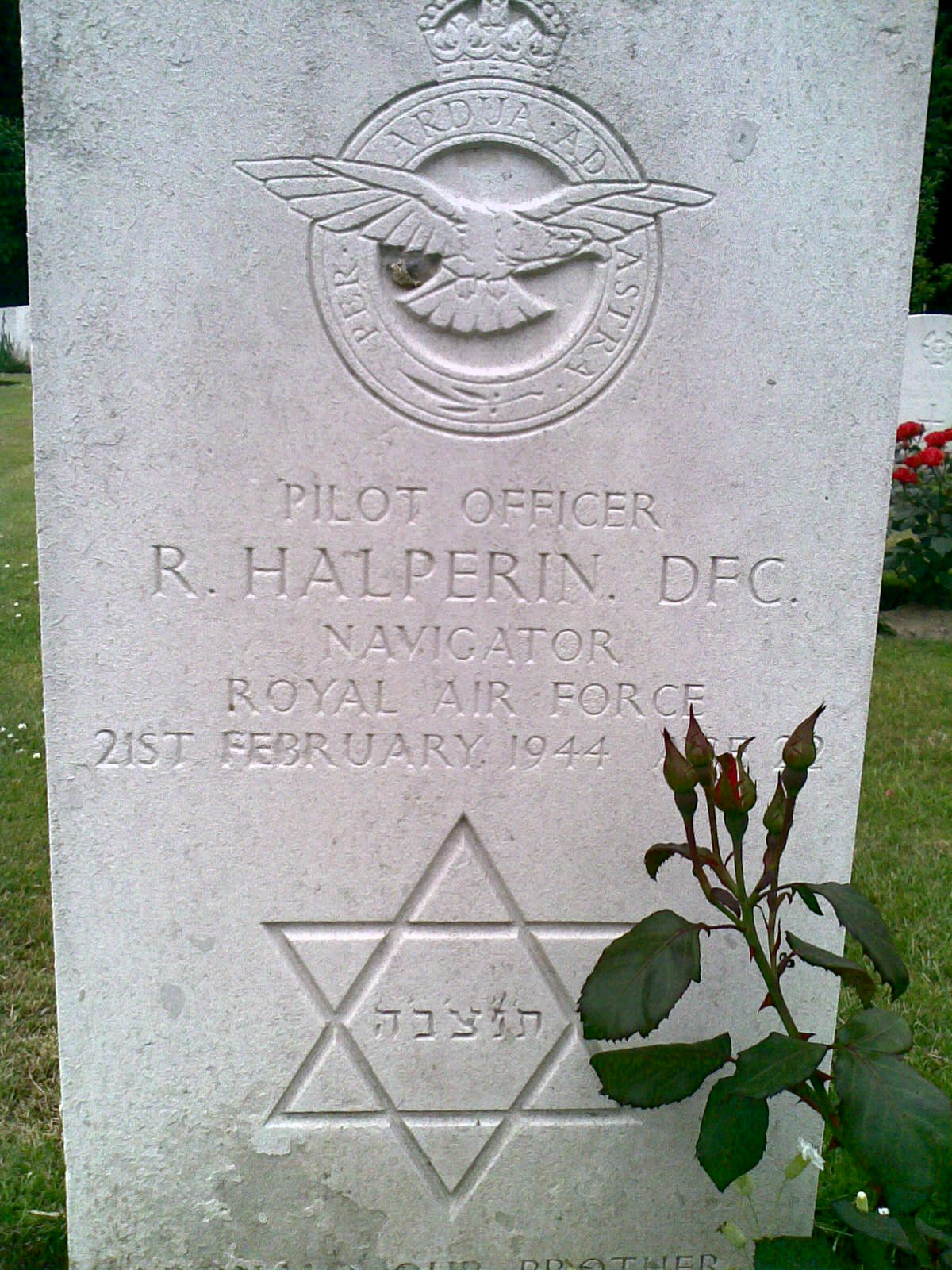
British Jewish grave
