= No. 582 Squadron RAF =

- Active: 1 April 1944 – 10 September 1945
- Country: United Kingdom
- Branch: Royal Air Force
- Type: Inactive
- Role: Pathfinder Bomber squadron
- Part of: No. 8 Group RAF, Bomber Command
- Mottos: Latin: Praevolamus designates (Translation: "We fly before marking")

Insignia
- Squadron Badge heraldry: On a hurt three mullets in a bend fimbriated A hurt represents the night sky while the three mullets, in the colours of flares used, symbolise the squadron's target-marking role
- Squadron Codes: 6O (Apr 1944 - Sep 1945)

Aircraft flown
- Bomber: Avro Lancaster; Four-engined heavy bomber

No. 582 Squadron RAF was a bomber pathfinder squadron of the Royal Air Force during the Second World War.

== History ==
The squadron was formed with Avro Lancasters on 1 April 1944 at RAF Little Staughton, Huntingdonshire, England, from 'C' Flight of 7 Squadron and 'C' Flight 156 Squadron. It was part of No. 8 Group RAF, also referred to as the Pathfinder Force, and began operation nine days later with a night raid on Lille on the 9/10 April 1944. The squadron's last operational raid against enemy forces was a raid on gun batteries on the island of Wangerooge on 25 April 1945. The squadron spent the remainder of the war dropping food to the Dutch, during Operation Manna, and repatriating prisoners of war in Operation Exodus. It was disbanded at RAF Little Staughton on 10 September 1945.

No. 582 Squadron had operated 2,157 sorties and lost 28 aircraft during the war.

== Victoria Cross ==
During a raid on 23 February 1945, Captain Edwin Swales, a South African, won a posthumous Victoria Cross over Pforzheim. In addition, a further posthumous VC was awarded to a pilot of a No. 582 Squadron aircraft. Sqn Ldr Robert "Bob" Palmer, a Mosquito pilot of 109 Squadron led a daylight attack on 23 December 1944, using OBOE, on the Gremberg marshalling yards in Cologne with his regular navigator Flt Lt George Russell. They were flying on the Lancaster (PB371) of Flt Lt Owen Milne alongside other No. 582 Squadron aircrew. Of those on board the aircraft, only the rear gunner survived the attack.

== Aircraft operated ==
Aircraft operated by No. 582 Squadron RAF
From	To	Aircraft	Version
April 1944	September 1945	Avro Lancaster	Mks.I & III

== Squadron bases ==
Bases and airfields used by No. 582 Squadron RAF
From	To	Base
1 April 1944	10 September 1945	RAF Little Staughton, Huntingdonshire

== See also ==
- List of Royal Air Force aircraft squadrons
