= Bombing of Pforzheim in World War II =

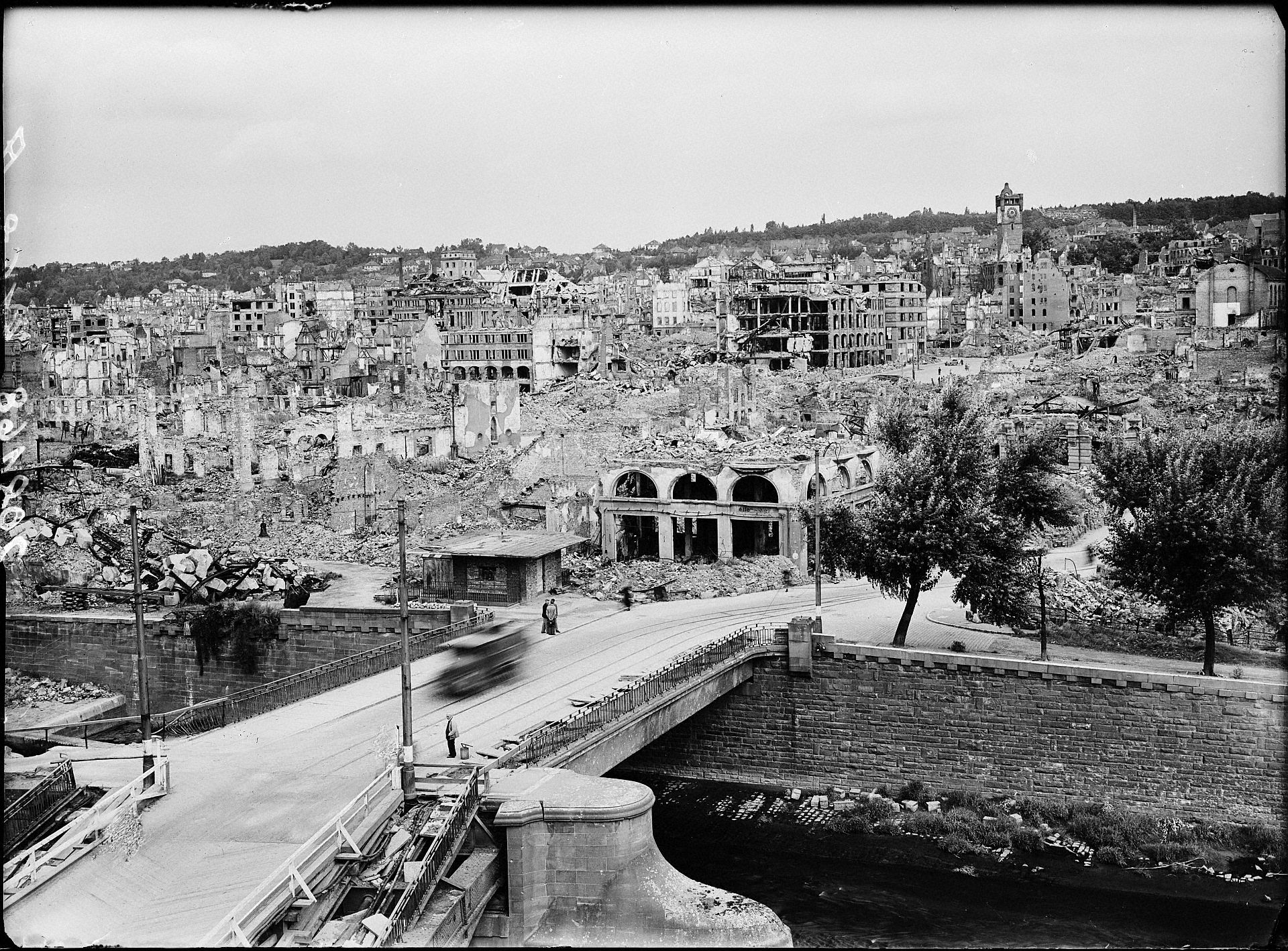
The destroyed Pforzheim in 1946

During the latter stages of World War II, Pforzheim, a town in southwestern Germany, was bombed several times. The largest raid, one of the most devastating area bombardments of the war, was carried out by the Royal Air Force (RAF) on the evening of February 23, 1945. Some 17,600 people, or 31.4% of the town's population, were killed. About 83% of the town's buildings were destroyed, two-thirds of the complete area of Pforzheim and between 80% and 100% of the inner city.

== Minor raids ==
The first Allied air raid on Pforzheim took place on April 1, 1944 when an attack by United States Army Air Forces (USAAF) bombers caused comparatively minor damage and killed 95 people. Further attacks by the USAAF followed, the largest on 24 December. Another on 21 January 1945 caused 56 casualties.

The RAF also carried out several nighttime nuisance raids on Pforzheim and other towns with de Havilland Mosquito light bombers. The raids, consisting of around six Mosquitos, forced the Luftwaffe to respond. They also helped confuse the defences, diverting resources away from the main bomber streams. These nuisance raids drove civilians into shelters and disturbed their sleep. Three consecutive raids occurred on the nights of October 2, 3 and 4, 1944 with a further three raids in October and one in November 1944. The RAF lost one aircraft in these raids.

After the devastating air raid of February 23, 1945, there were smaller air raids on Pforzheim. On March 4, USAAF B-24 Liberator aircraft bombed the area around "Kupferhammer". On March 14, 16, 18th, 19th, 20th and 24th, the railway facilities were bombed. On March 17, the motorway at Pforzheim was bombed, and on March 23 the area in Eutingen Valley was bombed.

== Reasons for the main raid ==
A report compiled for RAF Bomber Command dated 28 June 1944, stated that Pforzheim was "one of the centres of the German jewellery and watch making trade and is therefore likely to have become of considerable importance to the production of precision instruments [of use in the war effort]." An Allied report issued in August 1944 stated that "almost every house in this town center is a small workshop" and that there were a few larger factories in the south and one in the north of the city center. An attack on the city would destroy the "built-up area, the associated industries and rail facilities". There were no war-crucial targets; only war-relevant ones.

In November 1944, Pforzheim was placed for the first time on a target list of the Allied Forces, but with the lowest priority of category five. In that report, the city was described as being suitable for a raid, because the road and rail communications through the easily spotted old city was known to be flammable. Pforzheim was used in the transfer of troops.

== Main raid ==
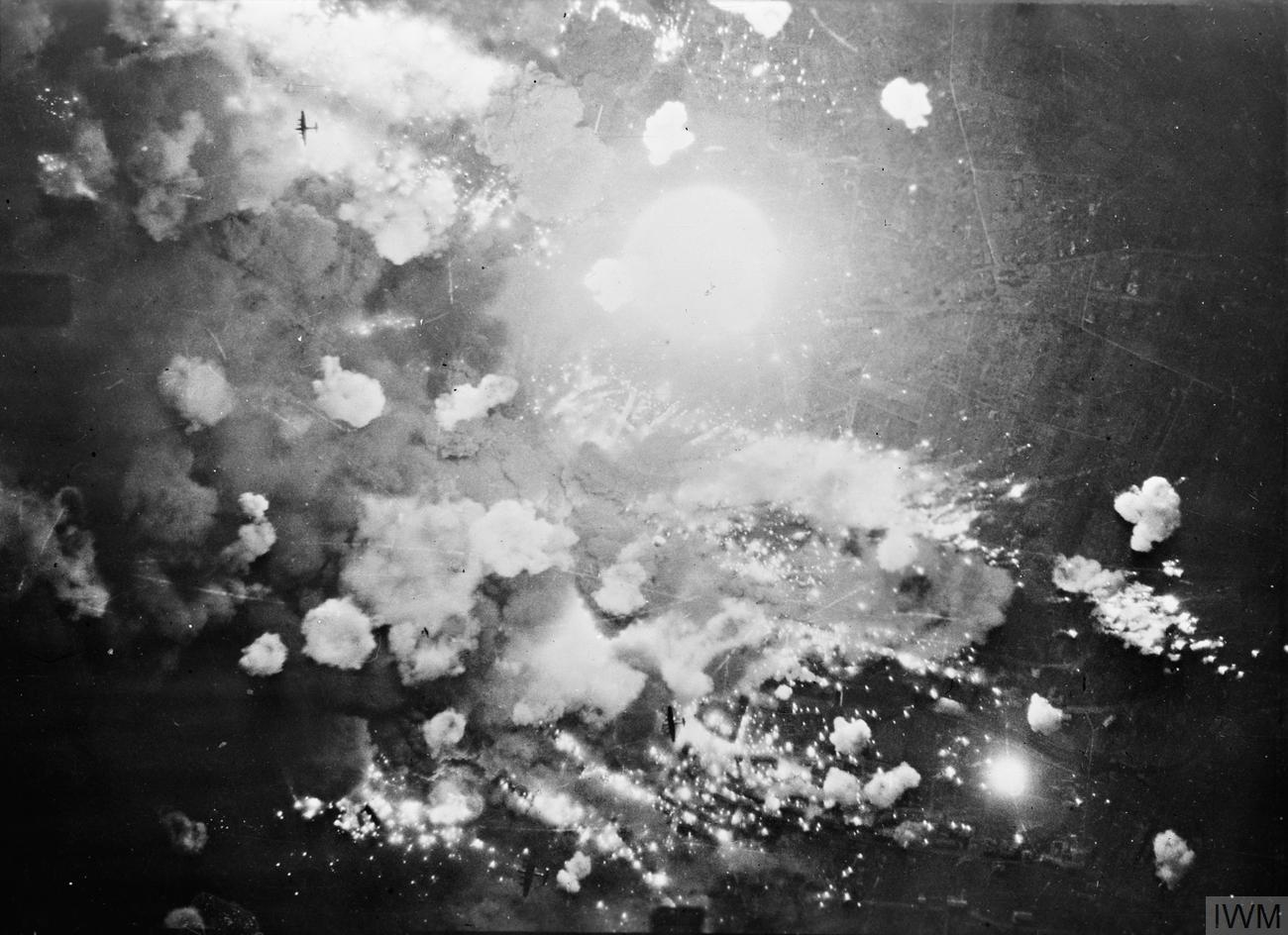
The attack as seen from a British bomber

The large raid that almost destroyed the inner city district occurred on the evening of February 23, 1945. The first bombs were dropped at 19:50 and the last one at 20:12. The attack on "Yellowfin", the RAF's code name for Pforzheim, included 379 aircraft.

The main force bombers were 367 Avro Lancasters of No. 1, No. 6, and No. 8 Groups along with one Film Unit Lancaster, and 13 Mosquitos of No. 8 Group (the Pathfinders). The master bomber for the raid was Major Ted Swales, DFC, a South African, aged 29, who would be awarded Bomber Command's last Victoria Cross of the war for his actions on this night. Despite severe damage to his plane he remained over the target directing the raid and died when his Lancaster crashed near Valenciennes on the return flight.

The bomber stream attacked from a height of 8,000 feet (2,400 m). The bombs were, by now, a standard mix of high explosive and incendiary bombs. The town center suffered immediate destruction and a firestorm broke out, reaching its most devastating phase about 10 minutes from the start of the raid. The smoke over the town rose to about 3,000 meters, and the returning bomber crews could still see the glare of the fire up to 160 km away.

Twelve aircraft of the bomber fleet did not return to their bases. Eleven of them were shot down by Luftwaffe fighters stationed at Großsachsenheim (now Sachsenheim), and another was assumed to have been accidentally hit by "friendly" bombs. At least two aircraft crashed not far from Pforzheim, and Swales' aircraft, which had been hit twice, crashed in France. One of the Lancasters that crashed near Pforzheim went down close to the village of Neuhausen (Enzkreis). Three of its crew members bailed out, of whom two survived; the remaining crew members died. The other one crashed near the village of Althengstett near the town of Calw.

=== Impact of the attack ===
The German Army Report of February 24, 1945 devoted only two lines to reporting the bombardment: "In the early evening hours of February 23, a forceful British attack was directed at Pforzheim". The post-war British Bombing Survey Unit estimated that 83 per cent of the town's built-up area was destroyed, "probably the greatest proportion in one raid during the war". In the center, almost 90% of the buildings were destroyed.

In an area about 3 km long and 1.5 km wide, all buildings were reduced to rubble. 17,600 citizens were officially counted as dead and thousands were injured. People died from the immediate impact of explosions, from burns due to burning incendiary materials that seeped through basement windows into the cellars of houses where they hid, from poisonous gases, lack of oxygen, and collapsing walls of houses. Some of them drowned in the Enz or Nagold rivers into which they had jumped while trying to escape from the burning incendiary materials in the streets, but even the rivers were burning as the phosphorus floated on the water.

After the attack, about 30,000 people had to be fed by makeshift public kitchens because their housing had been destroyed. Many Pforzheim citizens were buried in common graves at Pforzheim's main cemetery because they could not be identified. There are many graves of complete families. The labour office of 1942 listed 2,980 foreigners in Pforzheim, and one source puts the number of foreign laborers who died in the bombings at 498 (among them 50 Italians).

The inner city districts were almost totally depopulated. According to the State Statistics Bureau (Statistisches Landesamt), in the Market Square area (Marktplatzviertel) in 1939 there were 4,112 registered inhabitants, in 1945 none. In the Old Town area (Altstadtviertel) in 1939 there were 5,109 inhabitants, in 1945 only 2 persons were still living there. In the Leopold Square area, in 1939 there were 4,416 inhabitants, in 1945 only 13.

Some surviving Allied aircrew were killed after they fell into the hands of German civilians. Four weeks after the Pforzheim main raid, the British crew of a Avro Lancaster bailed out near Pforzheim where they were captured, and six of them were shot at the nearby village of Huchenfeld. One member managed to escape but was later recaptured and taken to a POW camp.

== Post war ==
Rather than rebuild the center of Pforzheim on the old street plan, the main thoroughfares were widened after the war. The rubble from the destruction was heaped into a large, high mound on the outskirts of the town and covered with soil and vegetation. It is officially named the "Wallberg". As with other German cities which have similar mounds, it remains a visible reminder of the destruction brought upon the city during World War II.
