= Juvincourt Airfield =

Former military airfield in northern France

Juvincourt Airfield Advanced Landing Ground (ALG) A-68
- Picardy Region, France

Site information
- Type: Military airfield
- Controlled by: Armée de l'Air; Luftwaffe (National Socialist); United States Army Air Forces
- Condition: Abandoned

Location
- Location within France
- Coordinates: 49°26′15″N 003°52′59″E

Site history
- Built: 1938
- Built by: Established by French Air Force (1938); Greatly expanded by German Air Force (Primary construction); Repaired by IX Engineer Command (USAAF), 1944
- In use: 1938–1945
- Battles/wars: World War II

Garrison information
- Occupants: German Air Force (1941–1944), Ninth Air Force, 1944–1945

Juvincourt Airfield is an abandoned military airfield, which is located near the commune of Juvincourt-et-Damary in the Aisne department of northern France.

Built originally as a grass airfield by the French Air Force before World War II, Juvincourt was expanded to become one of the main German Luftwaffe airfields in France during the German occupation (1940–1944), hosting a wide variety of both fighter and bomber aircraft, including German jet fighters and bombers. Seized by the Allies in September 1944 it became a major United States Army Air Forces base for fighter, bomber and transport units for the remainder of the European War (1944–1945). Juvincourt was a rallying point for Allied POWs who were repatriated to England in Exodus flights, often in Lancasters and other Heavy Bombers

Today, the airfield is a quiet place, hosting paintball fights and a Robert Bosch GmbH automobile testing centre and track. Extensive wartime relics can be found in the area as well as the former airfield.

== History ==
=== French Air Force ===
A French Air Force facility was built at Juvincourt during 1938 and 1939 consisting of a grass airfield with three small grass subfields associated with it:

- Amifontaine 49°49′54″N 003°57′08″E
- Guignicourt 49°26′49″N 003°56′08″E
- Proviseux 49°28′57″N 004°01′59″E

It appears that the French Air Force considered Juvincourt an auxiliary airfield and did not station any units or aircraft at the facility. After World War II broke out in September 1939, the Royal Air Force sent 16 Fairey Battles of 76 Wing, 142 Squadron to Proviseux (Berry-au-Bac), between 2–12 September 1939. The RAF aircraft, however, did not see any combat during the Phony War, and were moved on 12 September to Plivot.

=== Luftwaffe use ===
It was captured by the Germans in June 1940 during the Battle of France, and was developed by the Luftwaffe into the largest German military airfield in France during the occupation, having more than 300 aircraft assigned.

Under Luftwaffe control, the airfield was vastly expanded with an aggressive construction program. Three concrete runways aligned 17/35 5300' (1610 m); 09/27, 5280' (1600 m) and 05/23 6500' (1980 m) were laid down to provide all-weather use of the field. An enclosing perimeter taxiway loop connecting the ends of runways was built, connecting the airfield to the support station. A large concrete control tower was erected, 49°25′32.87″N 003°52′11.32″E and an expansive support base to the southwest 49°25′25″N 003°51′36″E was built in a wooded area with permanent, concrete structures. Barracks, workshop buildings, air raid bunkers, earth-covered concrete hangars and a series of taxiways connected the support and maintenance facilities with the airfield.

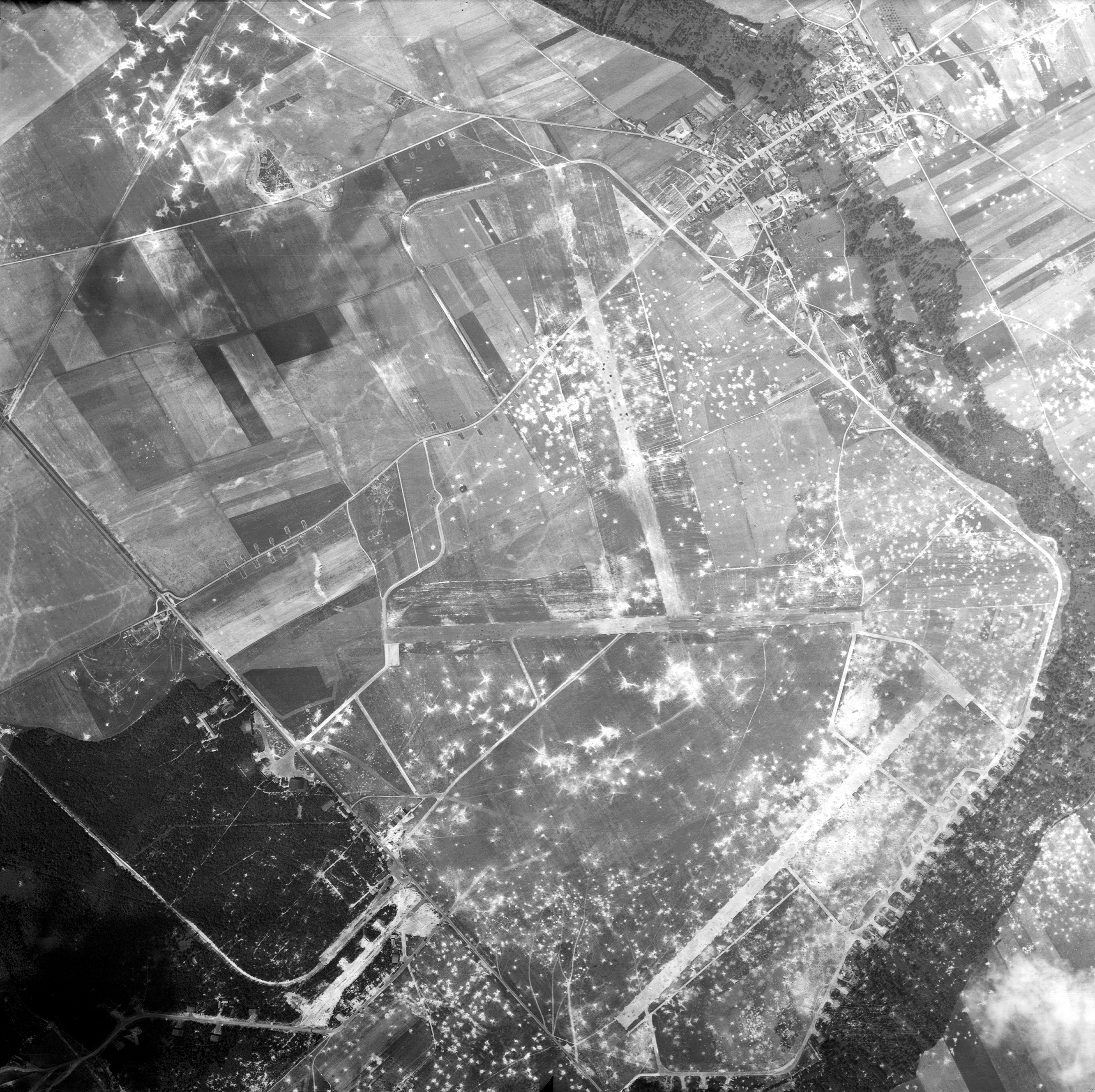
Juvincourt Airfield, 22 August 1944

A railroad spur was built, with a right-of-way from the northern main line to haul supplies and equipment, as well as disassembled aircraft and munitions to the airfield. In addition to the airfield and support base, barracks facilities were constructed in the commune of Juvincourt-et-Damary, on the northeast side of the airfield, being dispersed away from the airfield and technical support area.

Known German combat units assigned (All from Luftflotte 3, Fliegerkorps I) were:

- KG 77 (Kampfgeschwader, bombers) with Stab I. et II./ Gruppe March–June 1941, Junkers Ju 88A (Fuselage Code: 3Z+)
- KG 2 with IV. / Gruppe 13 June 1941 to January 1942, Dornier Do 17Z and Dornier Do 217 (Fuselage Code: U5+)
- KG 54 with the I / Gruppe 6 June – 27 July 1944, Junkers Ju 88 (Fuselage Code: B3+)
- KG 51 with the I / Gruppe 27–28 August 1944, Messerschmitt Me 262A2A-1 (Fuselage Code: 9K+) (15 aircraft)
- Einsatzkommando Schenck of 22 to 28 August 1944, Messerschmitt Me 262A2A-1
- Luftbeobachtungsstaffel 4 (Observation Squadron), formed on 1 May 1944 was stationed on the base until June 1944, Messerschmitt Bf 110 and Junkers Ju 88
- JG 11 (Jagdgeschwader, fighters) with the II. / Gruppe of 16 to 17 August 1944, Messerschmitt Bf 109G (Fuselage Code: 6+)
- NJG 4 (Nachtjagdgeschwader, night fighters) with III. / Gruppe of September 1942 in August 1944, Messerschmitt Bf 110, Dornier Do 217, and Junkers Ju 88 (Fuselage Code: MK)

In August 1944, an Arado Ar 234A Jet arrived at the airfield from Sonderkommando Götz to perform reconnaissance missions over Allied shipping at the landing beaches in Normandy, France. The mission on 2 August was the first photo-reconnaissance mission undertaken by a jet. Two Ar 234 continued to fly missions from Juvincourt until 26 August. One of the pilots; Erich Sommer, had spotted a member of the French resistance at the airfield with a camera. Soon afterwards the RAF attacked the airfield. The two Ar 234 were undamaged, but on 28 August they left Juvincourt for Belgium.

Juvincourt was a frequent target of Allied aircraft during the Strategic Bombing Campaign over Occupied Europe in 1943–1944. Eighth Air Force records show specific heavy Boeing B-17 Flying Fortress bomber attacks on the airfield in October 1943 and January 1944. It was also attacked routinely by Ninth Air Force Martin B-26 Marauder medium bombers. The medium bombers would attack in coordinated raids, usually in the mid-to-late afternoon, with Eighth Air Force heavy bombers returning from attacking their targets in Germany.

The attack was timed to have the maximum effect possible to keep the Luftwaffe interceptors pinned down on the ground and be unable to attack the heavy bombers. Also, the Republic P-47 Thunderbolts of Ninth Air Force would be dispatched to perform fighter sweeps over Juvincourt after the Marauder raids, then meet up with the heavy bombers and provide fighter escort back to England. As the North American P-51 Mustang groups of Eighth Air Force began accompanying the heavy bombers all the way to their German targets by mid-1944, it was routine for them to also attack Juvincourt on their return to England with a fighter sweep and attack any target of opportunity to be found at the airfield.

=== Allied use ===
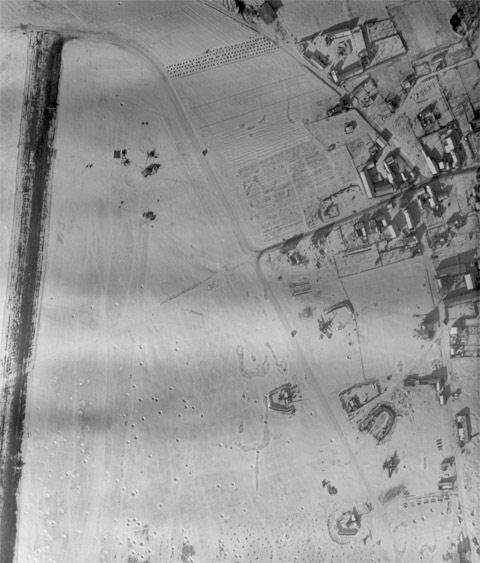
A-68 Juvincourt Airfield ALG 1944

The airfield was seized from the Germans by Allied ground forces on 5 September 1944. Before abandoning the station, the Germans conducted demolitions of whatever buildings had not been destroyed by Allied air attacks. Once in American hands, combat engineers of the IX Engineering Command 820th Engineer Aviation Regiment repaired the damaged airfield and declared it operationally ready for combat units on 7 September, only a few days after its capture from German forces, being designated as Juvincourt Airfield (A-68)

Although operationally usable, Juvincourt was a wrecked base from the numerous Allied air attacks since late 1942 and what was blown up by the Germans as they withdrew. The Americans made do with the portion of the airfield closest to the town of Juvincourt 49°26′36″N 003°53′09″E, repairing the 35/17 NW/SE runway for operational use. Most of the personnel were billeted in old German and French military barracks that could be used in the town, the barracks facilities in the village being much appreciated by aircrews and ground personnel, who were used to living in tents since their departure from airfields in England in June. What was not constructed of reinforced concrete was shattered, although even some of those were destroyed by the 500lb GP bombs of the Marauders and Flying Fortresses. Many buildings of masonry construction had been made useless, their contents consisting of nothing but wreckage.

Under American control, Ninth Air Force used the station for several units from 7 September 1944 until closing the airfield in July 1945. Known units assigned were:

- 439th Troop Carrier Group, 8–28 September 1944 (Douglas C-47 Skytrain)
- 404th Fighter Group, 13 September-4 October 1944 (Republic P-47 Thunderbolt)
- 365th Fighter Group, 15 September-4 October 1944 (P-47 Thunderbolt)
- 36th Fighter Group, 1–27 October 1944 (P-47 Thunderbolt)
- 367th Fighter Group, 28 October 1944 – 1 February 1945 (Lockheed P-38 Lightning)
- 368th Fighter Group, 27 December 1944 – 5 January 1945 (P-47 Thunderbolt)
- 410th Bombardment Group, February–May 1945 (Douglas A-20 Havoc)

Each group had three or four combat squadrons of aircraft assigned to the airfield, making Juvincourt one of the largest and most active USAAF fields on the continent. Attacks on German ground forces, bridges, airfields still in Luftwaffe hands, railroads and any target of opportunity of the German forces were targets of the Thunderbolts as the ground forces moved east into Luxembourg and past the Siegfried Line into Germany. In addition, the Royal Air Force also utilized Juvincourt, units and aircraft are yet to be determined.

With the war ended, Juvincourt became largely a transport airfield, being used by the RAF also for repatriation of English, Australian and New Zealand prisoners of war. These transfers were made by Lancasters of No 463 Squadron and No 467 Squadron RAAF, together with No 186 Squadron and No 50 Squadron. (operation Exodus)

The airfield was returned to French control on 2 July 1945.

=== Postwar ===
In French control after the war, the base sat abandoned for several years. There was much un-exploded ordnance at the site which needed to be removed, as well as the wreckage of German and American aircraft. Many of the buildings at the base were destroyed by the Allied air attacks, and although some had been repaired by the American combat engineers, most were in ruins. Although it was a prewar French Air Force facility, the Air Force wanted nothing to do with a Nazi airfield on French soil. As a result, the Air Ministry leased the land, concrete runways, structures and all, out to farmers for agricultural use, sending in unexploded ordnance teams to remove the dangerous munitions.

In 1950 when as a result of the Cold War threat of the Soviet Union, the airfield at Juvincourt was offered to the United States Air Force by the French Air Ministry as part of their NATO commitment to establish a modern Air Force station at the site. Some construction was performed, pouring an 8000' jet runway (05/23) to the south of the World War II airfield, along with aircraft dispersal areas at each end of the runway. However the construction was never completed due to the high cost of breaking the agricultural leases, and also the high costs of removing the concrete German runways and other facilities. It was cheaper to build an airfield elsewhere and the land was simply sold off to private interests.

== Current ==
Today Juvincourt Airfield is a quiet place, consisting of mostly agricultural fields. The N44 highway bisects the airfield, crossing over the southwest part running NW/SE.

Of the three concrete runways laid down by the Luftwaffe, only the northwest–southeast (17/35) remains at full length and width. although some sections have been removed over the years. Many patched bomb craters are evident on the concrete. A significant amount of the east/west (09/27) runway still exists, also extensively patched, however, the 05/23 runway is almost nonexistent, being almost totally removed for hardcore aggregate. A very small section, however, can be found in the middle of a field 49°26′03.80″N 003°52′03.26″E connecting two single-track agricultural roads which are the remaining narrow concrete strips of the former runway, the full width of which can be seen in disturbed earth along the road. The enclosing perimeter track taxiway exists also as single-lane concrete farm roads. Connecting taxiways of the airfield exist as well in the same condition.

An interesting feature 49°26′07.27″N 003°52′27.84″E can be found in the middle of the airfield. It is a concrete circle in a ring, that indicates the cardinal points of the compass. It was connected by a taxiway and was used to adjust aircraft navigation equipment. The concrete control tower (coordinates listed above) today is a restaurant, with what appears to be a connecting wartime building as part of the structure located today on the west side of the N44. About 1 km northwest, also along the N44 is a British World War I cemetery 49°25′50.23″N 003°51′48.53″E which has the graves of many Tommies killed along the Western Front trenches that were close by the area. Nearby the cemetery are concrete bomb shelters dug by the Germans and reinforced, to protect personnel during the frequent Allied air raids.

The wooded areas to the southwest of the airfield 49°25′42″N 003°51′53″E, adjacent to the N44 is where the German ground support station was built. Many buildings still remain in the woods, in various states of disrepair, almost all constructed of concrete. This area is now on private land and access is prohibited. The woods contain underground bomb shelters; concrete aircraft hangars, ruins of barracks; workshops and other buildings. Photos of these structures can be found here: In aerial photography, the remains of aircraft taxiways and dispersal parking revetments can be seen which connected the technical site to the airfield. The railroad spur right-of-way 49°26′10.27″N 003°51′09.24″E is still visible in aerial photography, however the tracks have long since been removed.

In the commune of Juvincourt-et-Damary, northeast of the airfield, several buildings that appear to be the remains of former military barracks and bomb shelter exist. 49°26′33.33″N 003°53′25.25″E, 49°26′35.67″N 003°53′28.13″E, 49°26′46.24″N 003°53′12.56″E. Some are abandoned, some are in use today by the residents of the commune.

To the southeast of the wartime airfield is the 1950s jet aircraft runway and dispersal pads built when Juvincourt was proposed as a NATO airfield. Today it is owned by Robert Bosch GmbH, being used as an automobile testing centre and track.

Intense test car activity nowadays.

Former airfield structures are still clearly visible and the former operations tower along the main road is used as a restaurant pizzeria.

former perimeter road still in place and witnesses the immensity of former German base.

== See also ==
- Advanced Landing Ground
