= Vorupør =

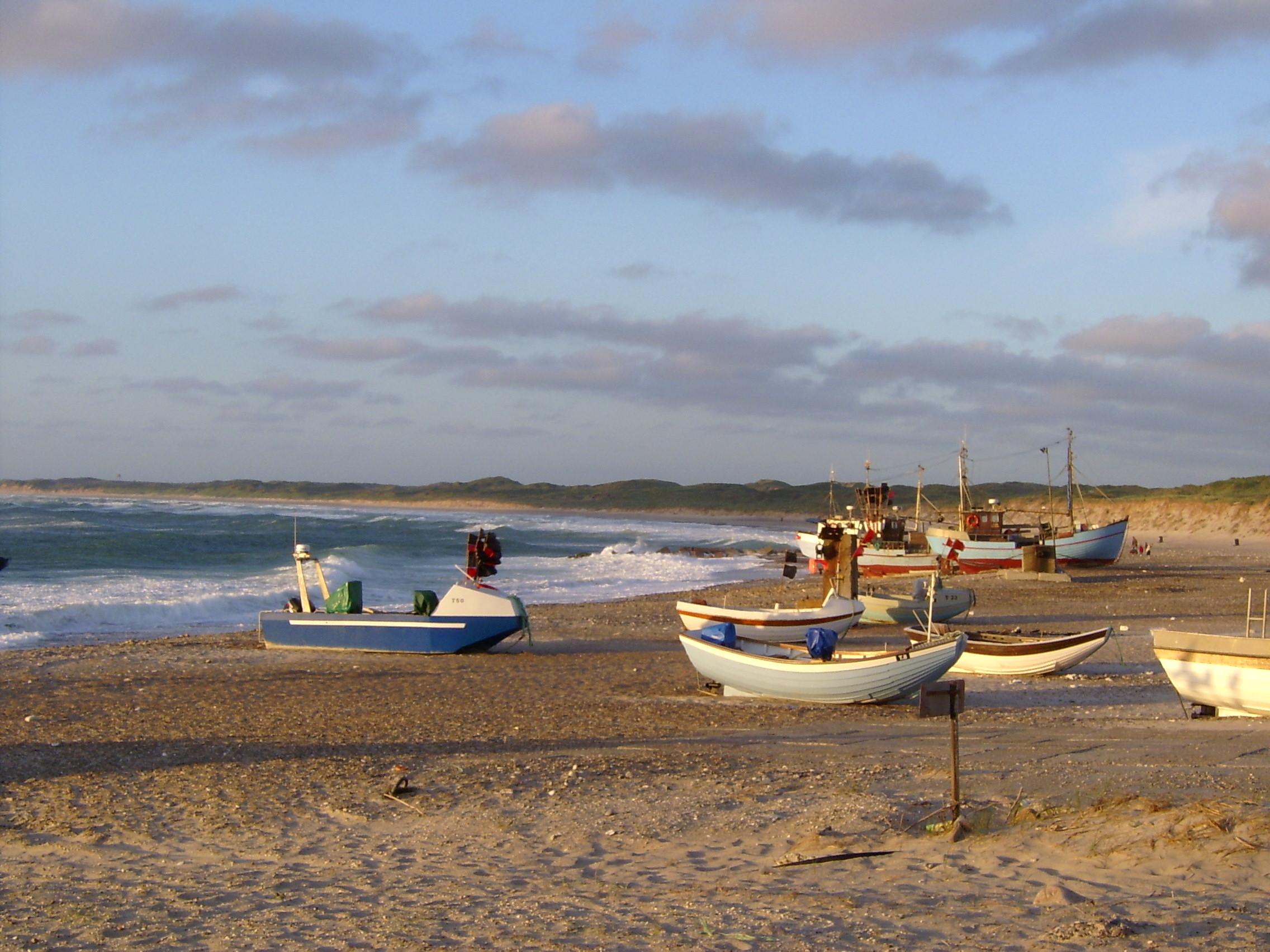
- The landing site with small fishing dinghies at the front and larger coastal boats in the background

- Location within Denmark
- Coordinates: 56°57′N 8°22′E
- Country: Denmark
- Region: North Denmark (Nordjylland)
- Municipality: Thisted
- Established: 1801

Population (April 2026)
  - Total: 663
- Time zone: UTC+1 (Central European Time)
- Postal code: 7700 Thisted
- Website: www.vorupor.dk

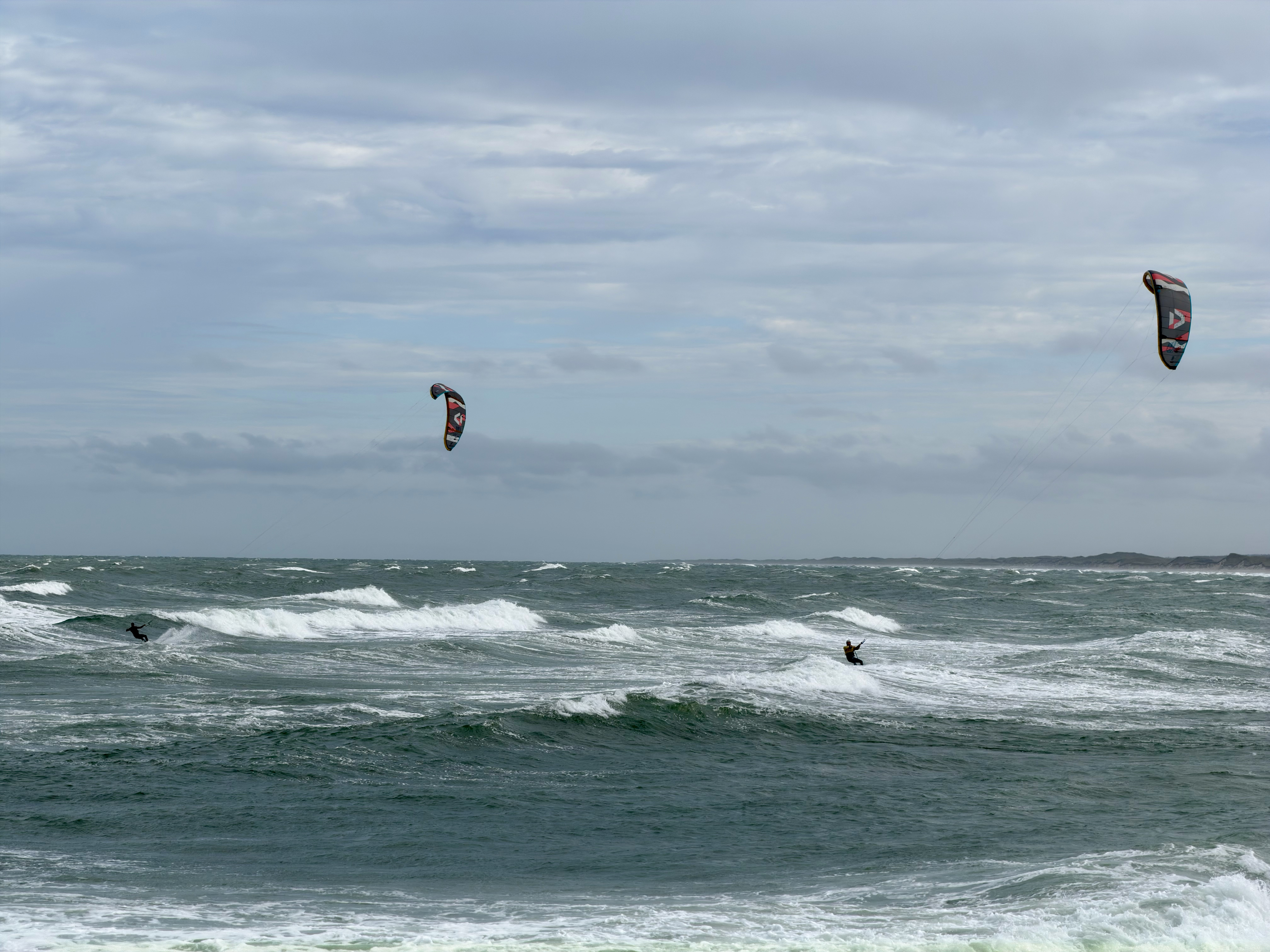
Kitesurfing in Nørre Vorupør

Vorupør is a coastal parish in the district of Thy on the North Sea coast of Jutland, Denmark. The major and northern settlement, Nørre Vorupør, has a population of 592 (1 January 2026) while Sønder Vorupør 2 km further south is much smaller. Vorupør is situated in Thisted Municipality, North Denmark Region.

While the traditional occupation was fishery, it is today mainly a small-scale tourist resort, known for its beaches, nature and relative unspoiltness, as compared to other resorts. Vorupør is situated in the middle of the Thy National Park which was inaugurated in 2008, however, the vast dune and heath areas surrounding the village have been protected areas for some decades.

During World War II, a RAF Avro Lancaster was shot down by a German night fighter just east of Norre Vorupør and crashed in the small lake of Ålvand.

== Fishery ==
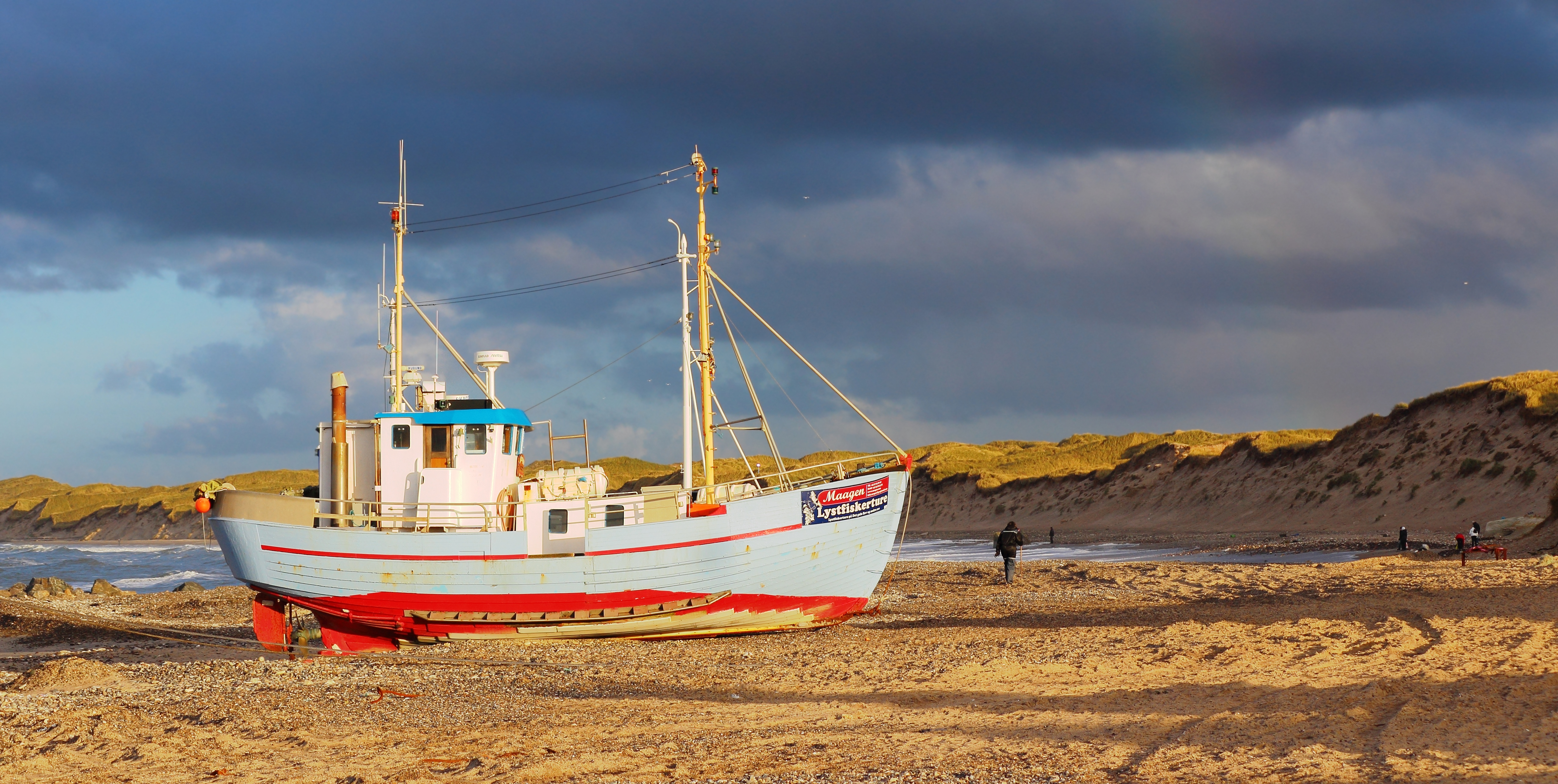
The leisure fishing boat Maagen on the beach

Like in other Danish coastal communities, full-time fishery has diminished. The last occupationally operated coastal boat stopped by 2010, but boats being operated for fishing tourists remain. Most of the fishing has traditionally been longline fishing, especially for cod. The smaller dinghies used for part-time fishing remain. Fishery with shallow boats built for dragging on to the open beach was formerly practised at many places in Northern Jutland, but remains only in Vorupør, Lild Strand and, most intensely, in Thorup Strand.

The pier at Vorupør was built in 1908 for protecting the boat landing site. The end of the pier is the most remote point from Copenhagen within Denmark, excluding the Faroe Islands and Greenland. Vorupør has a coastal rescue station under the Danish Maritime Safety Administration.

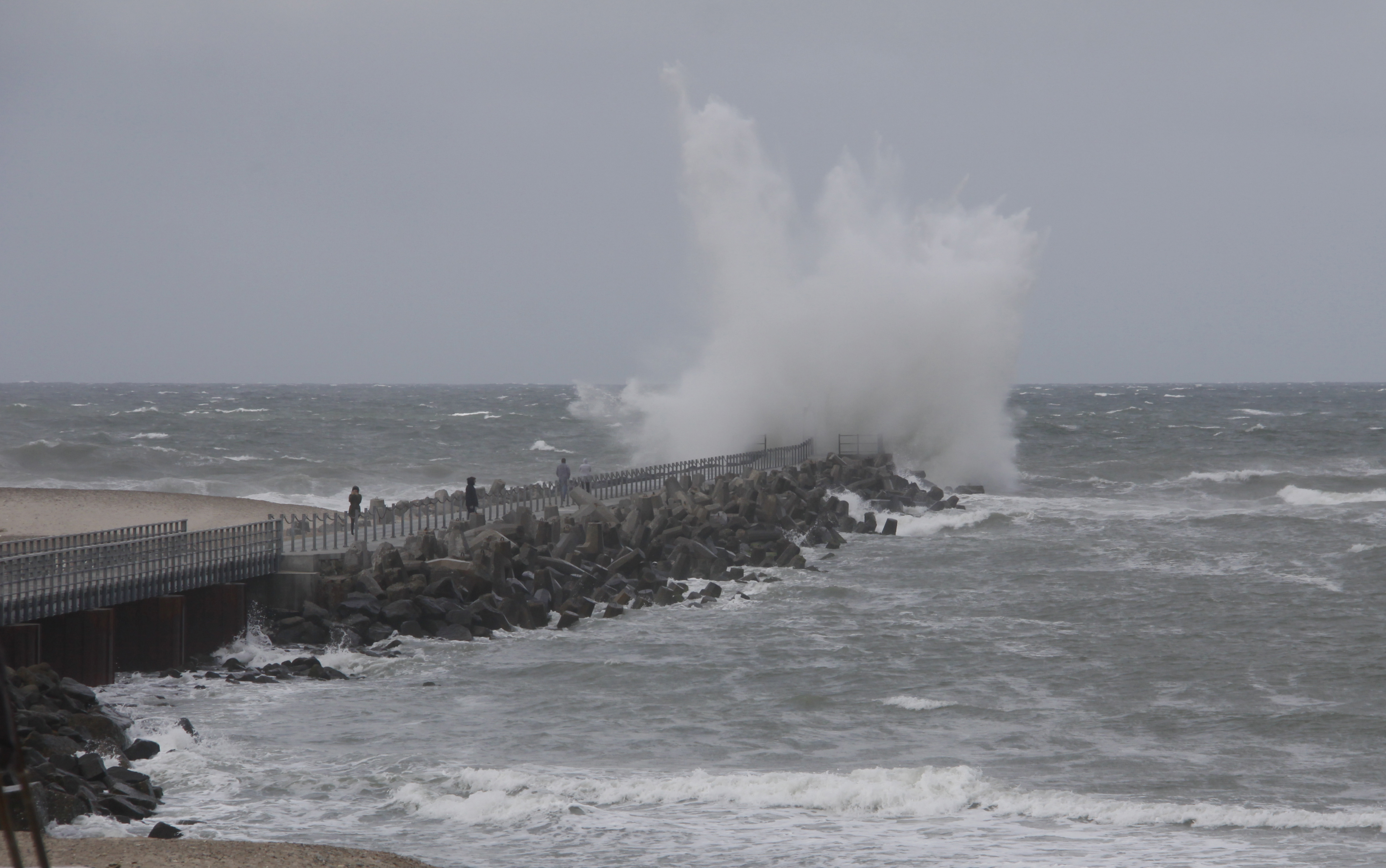
The pier of Vorupør at storm

In 1887 local fishermen founded Fiskercompagniet, the world's first cooperative fishing organisation. This local initiative was inspired by the Danish cooperative movement which was much more prevalent among farmers, and to some extent among urban workers. The co-op was originally based on strongly Christian rules, reflecting the religiousity of the community.
