= Juvincourt-et-Damary =

- Commune
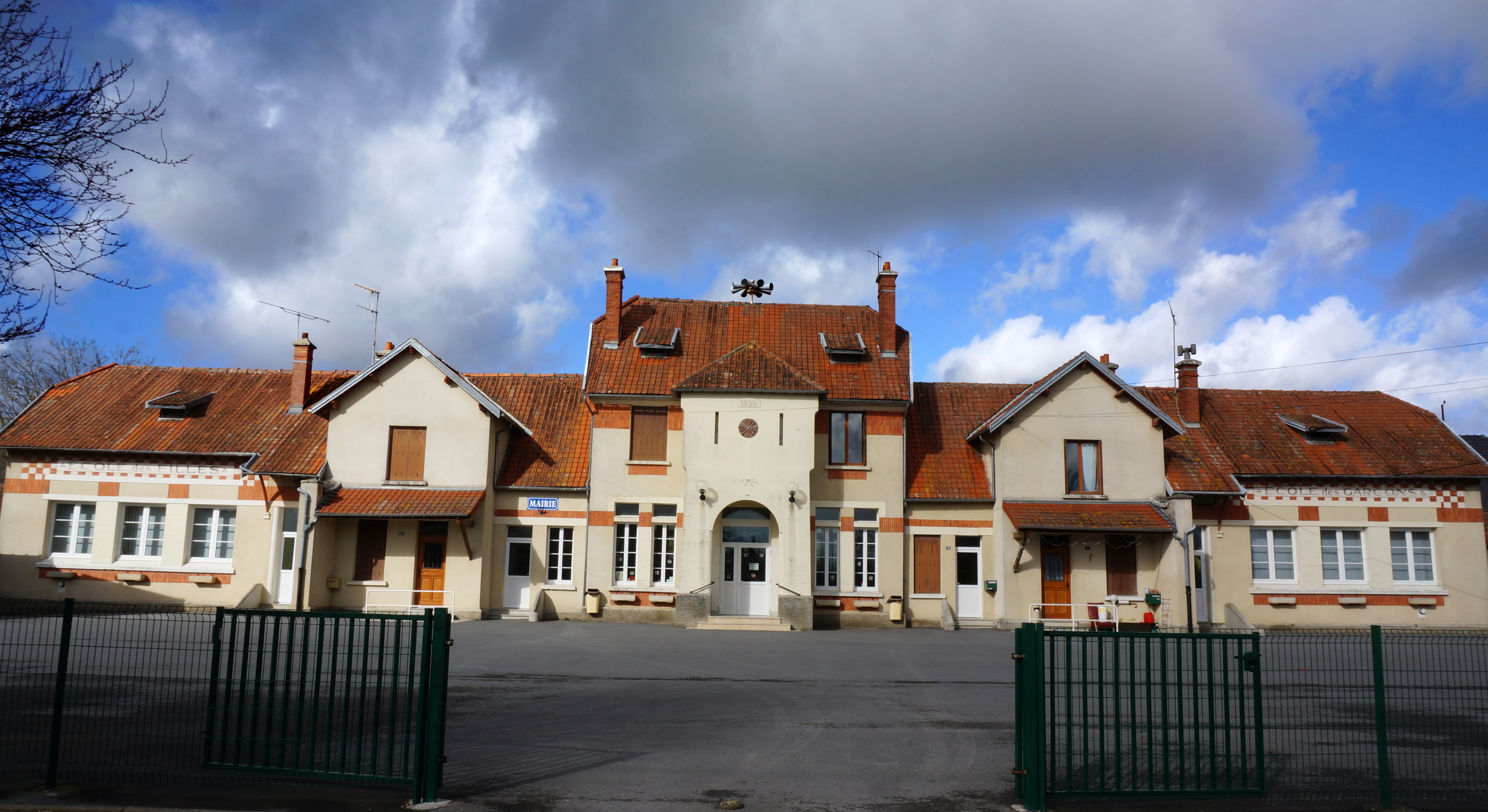
- The town hall and school of Juvincourt-et-Damary
- Location of Juvincourt-et-Damary
- Location within France Location within Hauts-de-France
- Coordinates: 49°26′50″N 3°53′35″E
- Country: France
- Region: Hauts-de-France
- Department: Aisne
- Arrondissement: Laon
- Canton: Villeneuve-sur-Aisne
- Intercommunality: Champagne Picarde

Government
  - Mayor (2026–32): Bénédicte Ducat
- Area^{1}: 29.82 km^{2} (11.51 sq mi)
- Elevation: 84 m (276 ft)
- Highest elevation: 101 m (331 ft)
- Lowest elevation: 52 m (171 ft)
- Population (2023): 604
  - Density: 20.3/km^{2} (52.5/sq mi)
- Time zone: UTC+01:00 (CET)
  - Summer (DST): UTC+02:00 (CEST)
- INSEE/Postal code: 02399 /02190
- ^{1} French Land Register data, which excludes lakes, ponds, glaciers > 1 km^{2} (0.386 sq mi or 247 acres) and river estuaries.

Juvincourt-et-Damary (French pronunciation: [ʒyvɛ̃kuʁ e damaʁi]) is a commune in the Aisne department in Hauts-de-France in northern France.

== Juvincourt Airfield ==
Built prior to World War II as a French Air Force facility. It was seized by the Germans in June 1940 during the Battle of France, and was used as a major Luftwaffe military airfield during the occupation.

The airfield was attacked on several occasions by United States Army Air Forces Eighth Air Force heavy bombers and later by IX Bomber Command Martin B-26 Marauder medium bombers, the airfield was liberated by Allied Forces in early September 1944. Once in American hands, combat engineers of the IX Engineering Command 820th Engineer Aviation Regiment repaired the damaged airfield and declared it operationally ready for combat units on 7 September, only a few days after its capture from German forces, being designated as "A-68"

The airfield was used by numerous Ninth Air Force combat units until May 1945. Afterward, the airfield was used for transport and as a maintenance base until being closed in July 1945, and was returned to French Air Force Control.

After the war, the French Air Force began building a new facility, with a new taxiway and modern dispersal pads. However, it appears that construction was never completed and the airfield was abandoned. Today the remains of Juvincourt Airfield consist of several abandoned World War II-era runways, along with the unfinished modern airfield in a vacant area.

== Population ==
Historical population
Year	Pop.	±% p.a.
1968	467	—
1975	413	−1.74%
1982	412	−0.03%
1990	392	−0.62%
1999	370	−0.64%
2007	454	+2.59%
2012	544	+3.68%
2017	599	+1.94%
2023	604	+0.14%
Source: INSEE

== See also ==
- Communes of the Aisne department
