= Robert Palmer (RAF officer) =

Royal Air Force officer

- Born: 7 July 1920; Gillingham, Kent, England
- Died: 23 December 1944 (aged 24); Cologne, Free State of Prussia, Nazi Germany
- Burial place: Rheinberg War Cemetery
- Military career
- Allegiance: United Kingdom
- Branch: Royal Air Force
- Service years: 1941–1944
- Rank: Squadron leader
- Nickname: Bob
- Units: RAF Bomber Command
- Conflicts: Second World War: European air campaign; Cologne bombing campaign †; Operation Millenium
- Awards: Victoria Cross; Distinguished Flying Cross & Bar

Robert Anthony Maurice Palmer, VC, DFC & Bar (7 July 1920 – 23 December 1944) was a bomber pilot in the Royal Air Force and a posthumous English recipient of the Victoria Cross, the highest award for gallantry in the face of the enemy that can be awarded to members of British and Commonwealth forces. His award was the result of his valour during the Allied action over Germany during the Second World War.

== Early life ==
The son of Arthur Palmer and Lillian (née Skuse), Palmer was born on 7 July 1920 at Gillingham, Kent. He was educated at Gravesend Grammar School (where a portrait in his memory and his Victoria Cross citation now hang in the school hall), before being commissioned in the RAF.

== Military career ==
Palmer first flew in operations during the Second World War in January 1941 and took part in the first 1,000-bomber raid against Cologne in 1942. He was one of the first pilots to drop a 4,000-lb. 'Cookie' bomb. In 1943 he served with 20 OTU at RAF Lossiemouth in Scotland.

By the end of 1944, Palmer had completed 110 bombing missions, many with the Pathfinder Force necessitating deep penetration of enemy territory and low-level 'marking' operations against heavily defended targets.

At 24 years old, as a squadron leader serving with No. 109 Squadron (RAF), he embarked on what was to be his final mission, for which he received the VC. On 23 December 1944 over Cologne, Germany, Palmer was leading a formation of Lancaster bombers on a daylight raid to bomb Cologne's Gremberg railway marshalling yards. His Lancaster PB371 was designated Master Bomber and using Oboe radio bombing equipment his orders were to mark the targets for the other heavy bombers to aim for.

Victoria Cross

Palmer was in command of one of 27 Lancasters accompanied by three Mosquitoes from No. 8 Group to attack the Gremberg railway yards. The air raid went badly. The force was split into three formations, each led by an Oboe-equipped Lancaster with an Oboe-equipped Mosquito in reserve. During the outward flight, two Lancasters collided over the French coast with the loss of both crews. On approaching their target over German airspace, they found that the forecasted cloud cover had cleared, leaving them exposed during the long straight approach and vulnerable to Cologne's AA defences. It was thus decided to allow the bombers to break formation and bomb visually.

The order to abandon the Oboe run did not reach Palmer, who continued with his designated role despite his aircraft having already been damaged by Wehrmacht flak cannon. Some minutes before reaching the target two of his engines caught fire, but rejecting alternative evasive action and being determined to provide an accurate and easily visible aiming point for the other bombers, he managed to keep the badly damaged aircraft on a straight course, made a perfect approach and released his bombs. His Lancaster was last seen spiralling to earth in flames and only one member of his crew, the rear gunner, escaped with his life.

The squadron lost a Lancaster and a Mosquito shot down by German flak artillery and Luftwaffe fighters, with a further Lancaster abandoned by its crew over Belgium; the losses totalled six aircraft out of the 30 dispatched.

Palmer is buried at the Commonwealth War Graves Commission Rheinberg War Cemetery in North Rhine-Westphalia, Germany. The inscription on his gravestone reads: 'A LONELY IMPULSE OF DELIGHT DROVE TO THIS TUMULT IN THE CLOUDS', a quote from 'An Irish Airman Foresees His Death' (1918) by W. B. Yeats.

== See also ==
- List of Second World War Victoria Cross recipients

== Bibliography ==
- Ingleton, Roy (2011). Kent VCs. Pen and Sword Books. ISBN 978-1848844094.
