= Bombers Fly East =

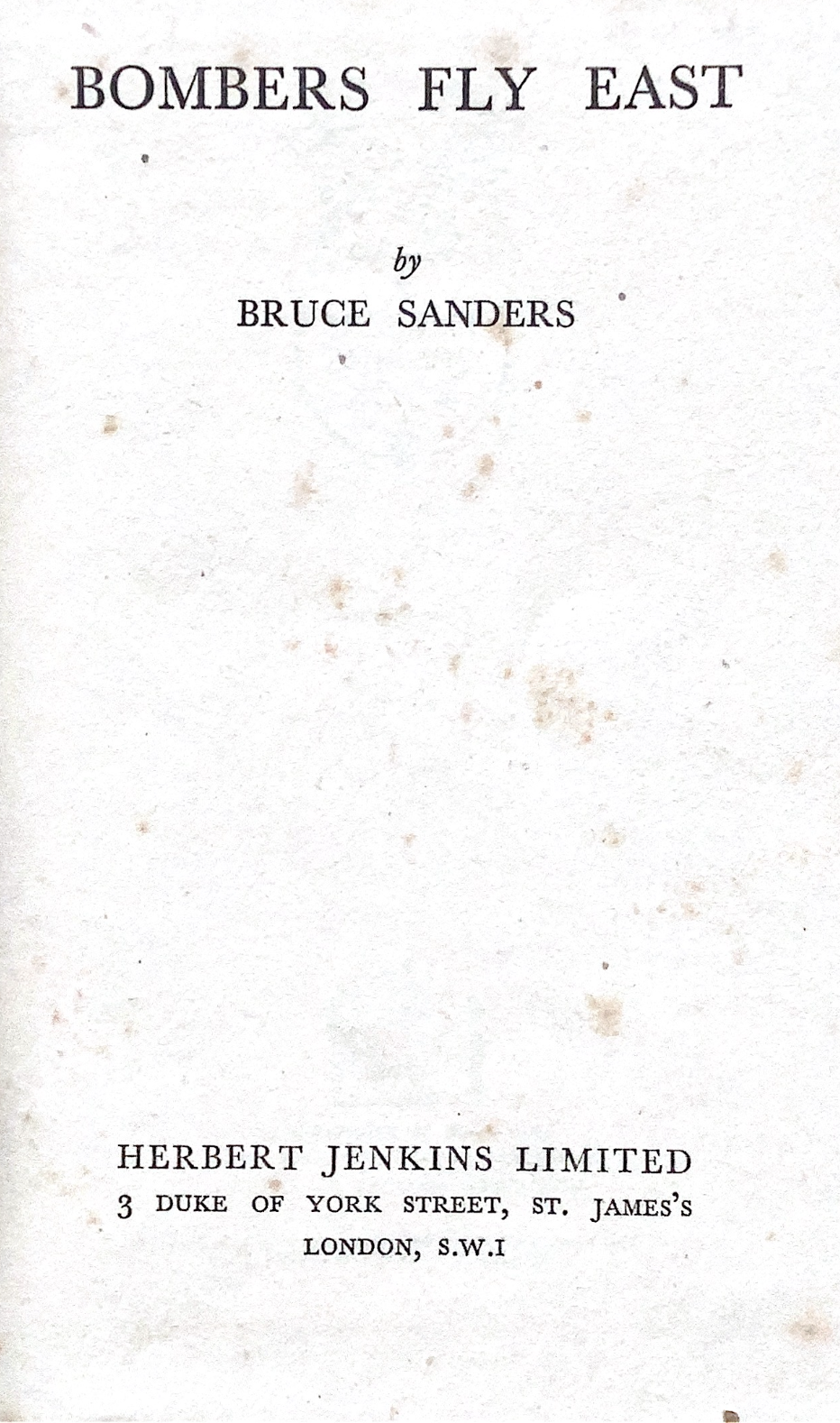
Title page of the first edition.

Bombers Fly East is a 1943 semi-autobiographical novel written by the author Bruce Sanders. (Note: Not to be confused with a book of the same name by Martin Bowman.) The novel tells the story of the struggles, defeats and successes of the airmen in the RAF Bomber Command.

The novel is notable for its aircraft photography that accompanied the text. First-editions are relatively rare.
